= Stormy, Misty's Foal =

1963 children's novel

First edition

Stormy, Misty's Foal is a children's novel written by Marguerite Henry, illustrated by Wesley Dennis, and published by Rand McNally in 1963. It is a sequel to Misty of Chincoteague (1947). Both novels are based on historical characters, human and equine, but many of the facts were changed in the stories. Stormy describes events on Chincoteague during the Ash Wednesday Storm that hit the Eastern Seaboard on March 6, 1962.

== Plot ==
Misty is a Chincoteague pony mare who is close to foaling and the Beebe family is anxious about it. Paul and Maureen check on her every day before and after school at almost every possible time, but soon a terrible storm system arrives first, setting up over Chincoteague with floods, hurricane winds, ice, and snow. At first reluctant to accept the threat of the storm, then reluctant to leave the island, the inhabitants are, in the end, forced to accept the devastation that lays waste to chicken farms and pony herds. This leaves the Beebes no choice: they keep Misty in their kitchen for the time being, while they evacuate. Paul also insists on getting a nanny goat if Misty does not accept her foal.

When Misty is taken to the vet on the mainland of Virginia (along with the goat), she has her foal there: a brown filly with a white moon on her forehead. She is named "Stormy" after a suggestion sent in by letter. Most of the novel is about the storm and its aftermath; the title character only arrives toward the end of the novel. The Beebes are concerned with restoration of Chincoteague and Assateague, and Misty and Stormy play a key role in this effort, giving shows in order to collect donations for the residents of Chincoteague.

== See also ==
- Beebe Ranch
