= Misty of Chincoteague (horse) =

Chincoteague Pony (1946–1972)

- Misty in 1969
- Breed: Chincoteague pony
- Sex: Mare
- Foaled: 20 July 1946
- Died: 16 October 1972 (aged 26)
- Country: United States
- Color: Palomino pinto
- Owner: Marguerite Henry

Misty of Chincoteague (20 July 1946 – 16 October 1972) was a Chincoteague pony made famous by the children's novel Misty of Chincoteague by pony book author Marguerite Henry.

== History ==
Misty of Chincoteague was foaled on 20 July 1946 at Beebe Ranch on Chincoteague Island, Virginia, United States. Her sire was the chestnut pinto stallion Pied Piper, and her dam was the smoky black pinto mare Phantom. Both of her parents were Chincoteague ponies. Misty grew to be a 12 hands (48 inches, 122 cm) palomino pinto with a marking on her left side, resembling a map of the United States, and a blaze shaped like the state of Virginia. She bred by Clarence Beebe and Ida Beebe, the owners of Beebe Ranch.

Shortly after Misty's birth in 1946, famed children's book and pony book author Marguerite Henry visited Chincoteague Island for the annual Pony Penning, looking for a story for her next book. While staying on the island, Henry met the Beebes, as well as Phantom and her foal, Misty. Henry offered to buy Misty, with the aim of using the foal as the model for her next pony book cover, but the Beebes refused. Eventually, the Beebes relented, and sold Misty to Henry after Henry promised that she would include their grandchildren, Maureen and Paul Beebe, in her next book. Henry purchased Misty for $150. Misty arrived at Henry's residence at Mole Meadow in Wayne, Illinois, on 18 November 1946.

Misty stayed with Henry for over a decade, making appearances at schools, movie theaters, museums, libraries, and horse shows to promote Henry's 1947 children's book, Misty of Chincoteague. Henry kept Misty with Friday, a Morgan horse that Henry used as her personal mount; and Jiggs, a donkey who also served as the cover model for Henry's 1953 children's novel, Brighty of the Grand Canyon. Misty was trained to both ride under saddle and to perform tricks, such as standing on a stool and "shaking hands", which she became famous for. Misty was the only equine member of the American Library Association (ALA), and Henry would bring Misty to their conventions. After Misty of Chincoteague became a bestseller, publisher Rand McNally rewarded Clarence Beebe with a $350 check as an additional "thank-you" for selling Misty to Henry as a foal.

After 11 years of touring and making appearances, Misty was retired to Beebe Ranch in 1957, where she became a broodmare. She would later become immortalized through the pony book genre and the 1961 film adaptation Misty, which was based on Henry's 1947 novel. Misty has gone on to become one of the icons of Chincoteague Island, Virginia, and the main ambassador for the Chincoteague Pony horse breed. She died peacefully in her sleep of natural causes on 16 October 1972, aged 26.

After her death, Misty was taxidermied by Charles Oxenham, and put on display at the Beebe Ranch in Chincoteague, Virginia. She was later moved to the Museum of Chincoteague Island, run by the Misty of Chincoteague Foundation, after a refurbishment in 1996.

== Description ==
Misty would serve as a conformational example of the "Traditional Type", or "Classic Type", of Chincoteague Pony in terms of anatomy: A solid stock pony type that was sound, with some flaws that were typical for range-bred horses, such as having a blocky head; being long-backed; a bit downhill, with a very thick neck and prominent withers, or "mutton-withered"; no freedom of the jowls; a bit straight in the hinds; having a sloped croup, with a middle-to-low-set tail; and being a little over at the shoulder.

Misty possessed a versatile and sturdy build, with short, thick legs. Many of her descendants are used as riding ponies and show ponies today, and Misty has become one of the foundation broodmares in the Chincoteague Pony horse breed.

A palomino pinto, Misty was heterozygous for the cream gene, which passed to only one of her foals: the Chincoteague Pony stallion Phantom Wings (1960–1964), who has no known descendants today, but some of Misty's descendants inherited the cream gene from other ancestors. It is believed that Misty inherited her cream gene from her mother, Phantom, who was a smoky black, a color produced by the action of a heterozygous cream gene on an underlying black coat color.

Misty was also heterozygous for the pinto gene, which passed to her descendants through her third surviving foal, the Chincoteague Pony mare Stormy (1962–1993).

== Issue ==
Misty produced three foals by the 1955/1956 chestnut pinto Chincoteague Pony stallion Wings:

- Phantom Wings (6 April 1960 – December 1964)
- Wisp O'Mist (21 March 1961 – December 1964)
- Stormy (11 March 1962 – 24 November 1993)

Misty gave birth to her first foal – a palomino pinto colt named Phantom Wings – on 6 April 1960. Stories announcing his birth appeared in numerous newspapers, and hundreds of people visited Beebe Ranch to see Misty's first foal. Marguerite Henry also flew in to see the newborn; publisher Rand McNally sponsored a contest to name the foal, which was won by Carol and Cheryl Costello, a pair of twins from South Dakota. Phantom Wings had a short career as a stud at Beebe Ranch, but only had one foal: a chestnut colt named Sandpiper (b. 1964), out of a Chincoteague mare named Nora. A Breyer Animal Creations horse model of Phantom Wings was made from 1983 to 1987.

The mare's second foal – a solid chestnut filly, with no markings, named Wisp O'Mist – was born on 21 March 1961. Her name was chosen from one of the runner-up entries to publisher Rand McNally's earlier naming contest for Phantom Wings. Wisp O'Mist only had one foal, a palomino gelding named Cloudy (b. 1964), who was sired by a buckskin Chincoteague Pony stallion named Lightning. Both Phantom Wings and Wisp O'Mist died from colic in December 1964, after breaking into a cow pen and eating too much feed.

Misty's third and most famous foal was Stormy, a chestnut pinto filly born on 11 March 1962, during the Ash Wednesday Storm of 1962, a Category 4 nor'easter (tropical cyclone). During the storm, the Beebe Ranch stables flooded, and Misty had to be moved to the kitchen of the Beebe home. As Misty was having trouble giving birth, the Beebes decided to take her to a veterinarian in Pocomoke City, Maryland. Shortly after arriving, Misty gave birth to Stormy. When the Beebes returned, they found that almost half of the wild population of the Chincoteague ponies on Assateague Island and Chincoteague Island – 145 out of 300 ponies – had died. Soon after, Stormy and Misty went on special appearances to theaters that had re-released the film Misty (1961) to raise money to buy back ponies sold in previous Pony Penning auctions to rebuild the herd.

As Phantom Wings and Wisp O'Mist had both died young in December 1964, all of Misty's descendants today are descended from Stormy. In 1967, at the age of 5, Stormy gave birth to her first foal: a palomino pinto named Thunder (28 May 1967 – 1986), sired by the buckskin Chincoteague Pony stallion Lightning, who had previously been bred to Wisp O'Mist. Stormy's second foal, a chestnut pinto filly named Windy (22 September 1969 – October 1998), was born 1969 as the result of an accidental mating between Stormy and an unnamed Thoroughbred racehorse stallion that Ralph Beebe had at Beebe Ranch at the time.

In 1972, Stormy had a third foal, a bay filly named Breezy, who was also sired by Lightning. From 1973 to 1974, Stormy gave birth to two more fillies, this time sired by the 1962 chestnut Arabian stallion Al-Marah Sunny Jim: first, a solid chestnut filly named Rainy in 1973; and second, a chestnut pinto filly named Misty II in 1974. Stormy's last foal was a 1978 chestnut pinto filly named Foggy Mist, who was sired by a bay stallion named Mugwah, most likely an Arabian.

Stormy would feature in Marguerite Henry's 1963 children's book, Stormy, Misty's Foal. Along with her own book by Henry, Stormy was featured in several other pony books, such as Wild Ponies of Chincoteague by Joseph R. Spies (1977); Windy of Chincoteague by Ronald Keiper (1989); A Pony Promise by Lois Szymanski (1996); and others. Breyer Animal Creations created a model horse in Stormy's likeness in 1977. Stormy died on 24 November 1993 at the age of 31 in Waynesboro, Pennsylvania due complications from an earlier surgery to remove a cancerous tumor. The Beebes opted to have Stormy taxidermied and put on display alongside her mother, Misty.

== Books and film ==
Misty is featured in several children's books and pony books by Marguerite Henry:

- Misty of Chincoteague, illus. Wesley Dennis (1947)
- Sea Star, Orphan of Chincoteague, illus. Wesley Dennis (1949)
- Misty, the Wonder Pony, by Misty, Herself, illus. Clare McKinley (1956) – picture book
- Stormy, Misty's Foal, illus. Wesley Dennis (1963)
- A Pictorial Life Story of Misty, drawings by Wesley Dennis (1976)
- Misty's Twilight, illus. Karen Haus Grandpre (1992)
- My Misty Diary, illus. Bill Farnsworth (1997)

While Misty was too old to play herself in the 1961 film adaptation Misty, her fictionalized story was portrayed by other horses.

== See also ==
- List of historical horses
