= Misty of Chincoteague =

Misty of Chincoteague may refer to:

- Misty of Chincoteague (novel), a 1947 children's novel by Marguerite Henry
- Misty of Chincoteague (horse), a Chincoteague Pony mare, made famous by the novel

== See also ==
- Misty (film), a 1961 film based on the book
