= Museum of Chincoteague Island =

Virginia museum

Coordinates: 37.9279°N 75.3554°W

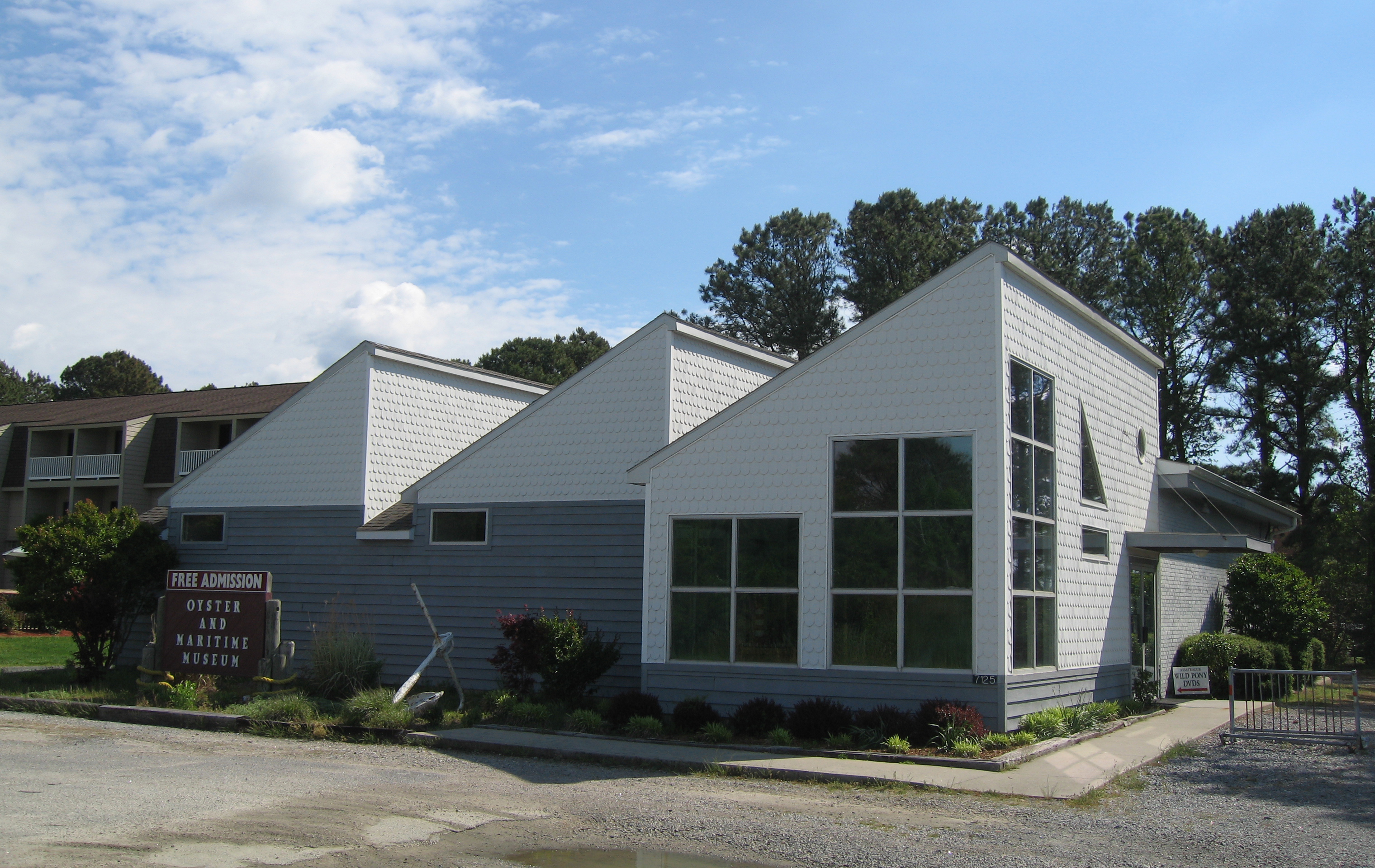
- Established: 1972
- Location: 7125 Maddox Boulevard; Chincoteague, Virginia
- Website: chincoteaguemuseum.com

The Museum of Chincoteague Island, located at 7125 Maddox Boulevard, Chincoteague, Virginia, United States, celebrates the people, culture and heritage of Chincoteague Island.

== Exhibits ==
Exhibits cover the entire history of the island from prehistoric times to today and include the first-order Fresnel lens from the nearby Assateague Light, as well as the 6th order Fresnel lens from the Fort Washington Light on the Potomac River. Other exhibits focus on the island's oyster industry, its maritime history, the wild ponies of neighboring Assateague Island, and the historic role of islanders as watermen, light keepers and shipwreck rescuers.

The museum is the home of the taxidermied bodies of the iconic Chincoteague pony Misty and her foal Stormy, which were made famous with the 1947 children's book Misty of Chincoteague, sequels, and a 1961 film adaption. In 2023, the museum purchased Misty's home, the Beebe Ranch, to preserve it with the intention of opening it as a visitors center.
