= Chincoteague National Wildlife Refuge =

U.S. National Wildlife Refuge in Virginia

- IUCN category IV (habitat/species management area)
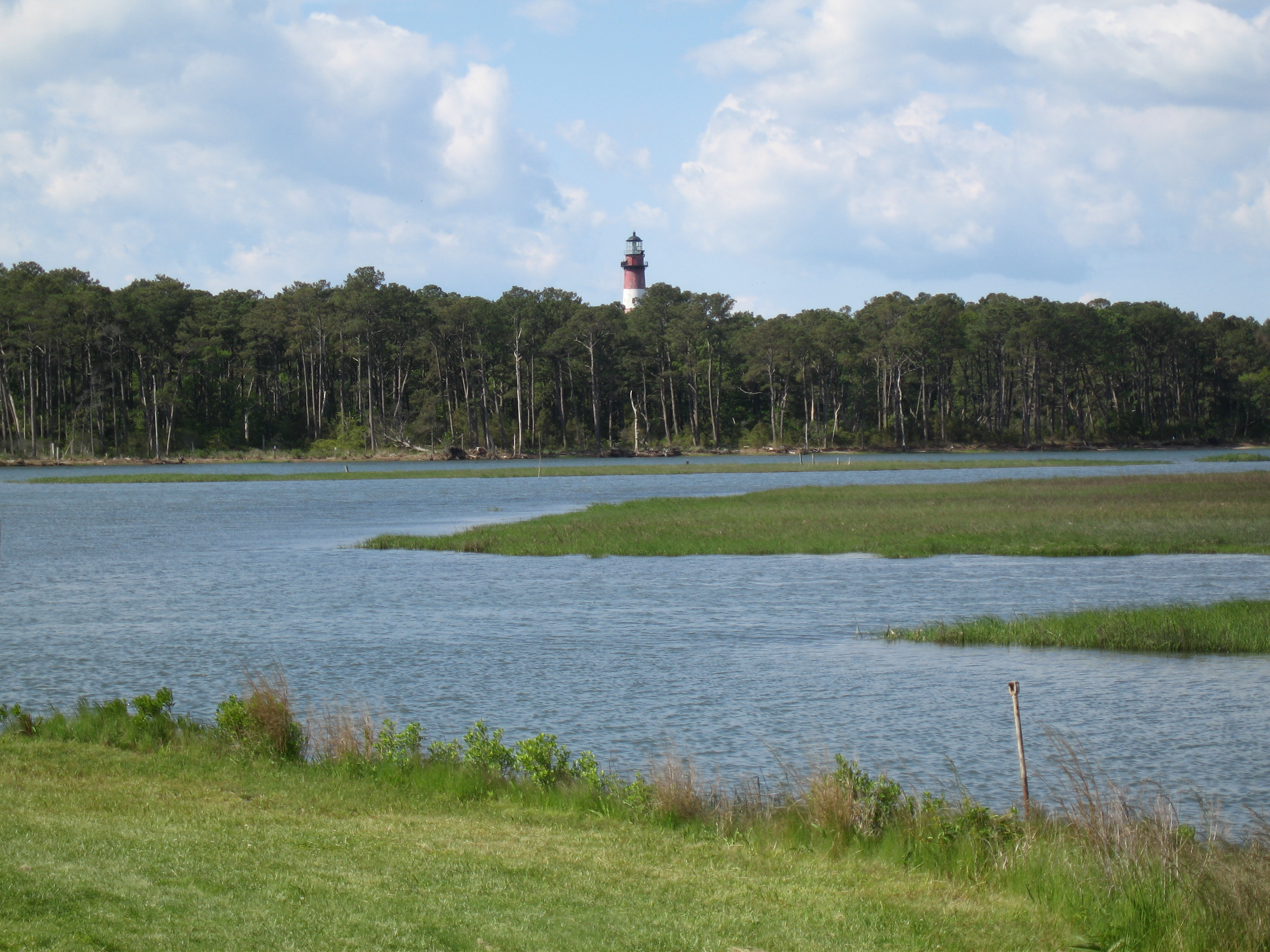
- Assateague Channel with Assateague Lighthouse in the distance

- Location within Virginia Location within the United States
- Location: Accomack County, Virginia / Worcester County, Maryland
- Nearest city: Chincoteague, Virginia
- Coordinates: 37°57′15″N 75°19′00″W
- Area: 14,000 acres (57 km^{2})
- Established: 1943
- Governing body: U.S. Fish & Wildlife Service
- Website: Chincoteague National Wildlife Refuge

The Chincoteague National Wildlife Refuge is a 14,000-acre (57 km^{2}) wildlife preserve operated by the U.S. Fish & Wildlife Service. It is primarily located on the Virginia half of Assateague Island with portions (only about 3%) located on the Maryland side of the island, as well as Morris Island and Wildcat Marsh. Mostly composed of beach, dunes, marsh, and maritime forest, the refuge contains a large variety of wildlife, including the Chincoteague pony. The purpose of the refuge is to maintain, regulate, and preserve animal and plant species as well as their habitats for present and future generations.

Chincoteague National Wildlife Refuge is one of the most-visited wildlife refuges in the country, drawing 1.5 million annual visitors via neighboring Chincoteague, with most arriving in the summer for the public beach. The refuge is also popular for the Chincoteague Island Pony Swim, in which the refuge's herd of ponies is rounded up and corralled before swimming the channel to Chincoteague.

The refuge is part of Assateague Island National Seashore but is managed separately from the Maryland portion of the National Seashore, which is operated by the National Park Service.

== History ==
Local legend has it that the ponies escaped from a shipwrecked Spanish galleon and swam to shore. However, historians believe that in the 17th century, settlers used the island for livestock to avoid fencing regulations and taxation. Even though no one is certain how the ponies got to the island, their descendants still live there today.

The island is also famous for shipwrecks, the most famous being the Dispatch. President Harrison and Secretary of the Navy Benjamin Tracy planned to visit the naval proving grounds on the Potomac River in 1891. The yacht's lieutenant had mistaken the orange glow from the Assateague lighthouse for the offshore hue on the Winter Quarter Shoals lightship. This caused the yacht to be steered off course and onto the shoals. No one was reported injured and everyone made it safely to shore.

The Assateague Lighthouse was constructed in 1833 to warn ocean travelers of the dangerous shoals offshore. A more powerfully illuminated brick lighthouse was in the process of being built, but was postponed due to the Civil War. Work resumed after the war, and the lighthouse was finished in 1867. A new assistant keeper's house was constructed in 1910, and in 1929 the keeper staff was reduced. In 1933, the original keeper's house was removed, and an oil lamp was replaced with an electric lamp. In 2004, the U.S. Coast Guard gave up ownership to the U.S. Fish and Wildlife Service. The Coast Guard is still responsible for maintaining the light, while the Chincoteague National Wildlife Refuge is responsible for the preservation of the lighthouse. In 2008, restoration of the lighthouse began. The Assateague Island lighthouse is listed on the National Register of Historic Places.

When the construction of the lighthouse began, Assateague Village was established. In 1915, there were 25 to 30 families reported living there, not including the lighthouse keepers and their families. Around 1922, the village started to decline in population after Dr. Samuel B. Fields of Baltimore acquired most of the land on the Virginia side of the island. Dr. Fields had his land fenced off, refusing villagers permission to cross his land to get to Toms Cove.

Since Toms Cove was blocked, villagers began to leave the island. Their houses then were jacked up, placed on skids, and taken to the waterfront. There, they were placed on barges and relocated to Chincoteague Island. Bill Scott had operated the village's only general store and was the last one to leave the village. In 1943, the S.B. Fields family sold their property to the U.S. Government for use as a National Wildlife Refuge.

In 1962, a bridge was constructed linking Chincoteague to Assateague Island for the first time and transforming the town from a fishing community into a tourism gateway for the refuge. By 2012, the refuge was seeing 1.5 million visitors a year.

== Activities ==
=== Beach ===
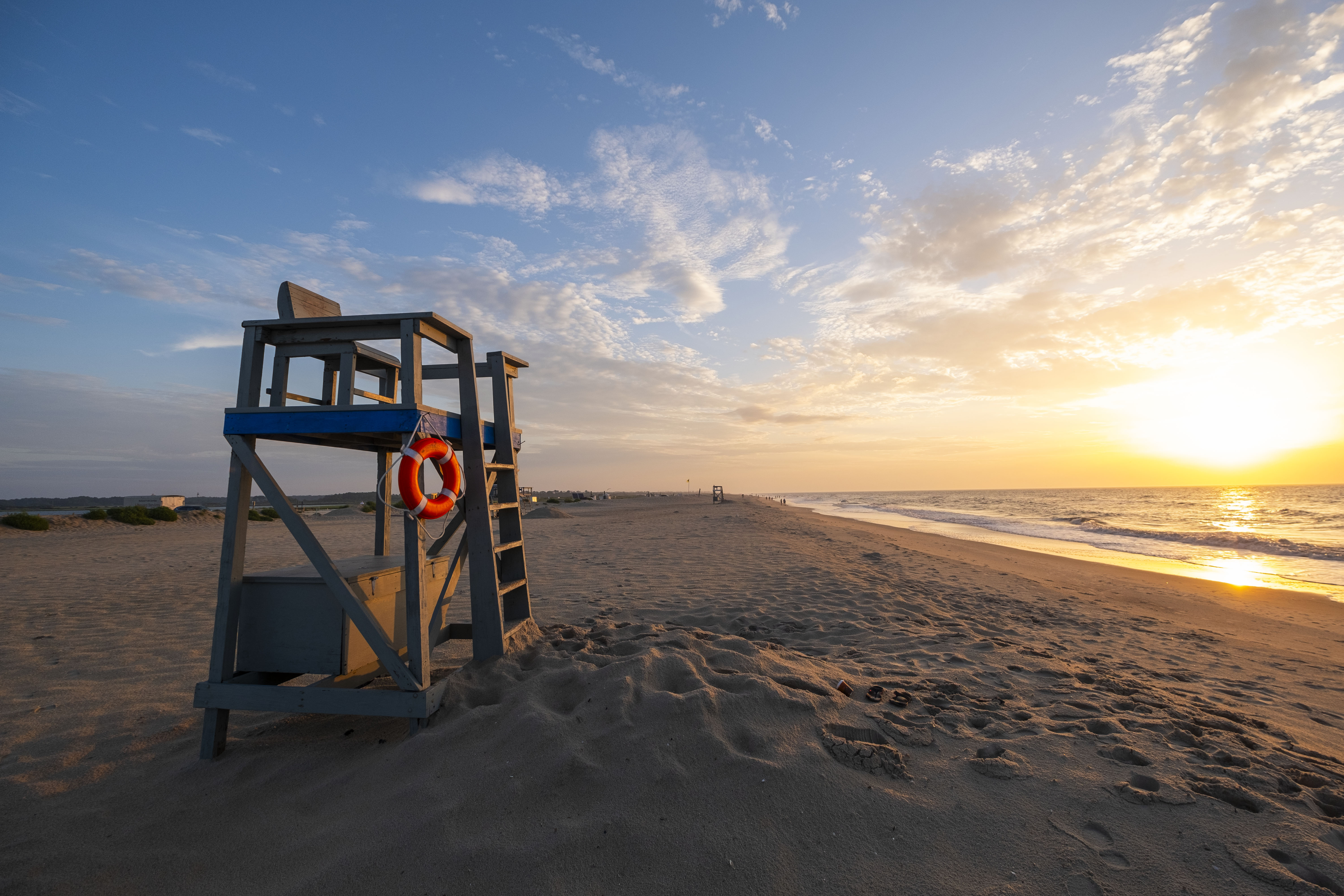
The beach at Chincoteague National Wildlife Refuge at sunrise in 2019

Chincoteague National Wildlife Refuge's most popular attraction is its mile-long, undeveloped beach. In a 2011 survey, 80% of visitors cited the beach as their main reason for coming to the refuge. The beach acts as an enclave within the larger refuge and is maintained by the National Park Service instead of the U.S. Fish and Wildlife Service. The NPS maintains parking lots of loose sand and shells to accommodate nearly 1,000 vehicles.

==== Long-term stability ====
With rising sea levels, the recreational beach is located on one of the most exposed places on Assateague Island and the area often floods due to large storms, forcing parking lots to be continually rebuilt further west at a cost of up to $700,000 per event. Areas that were once used for parking in the 1990s are now underwater. Park officials have questioned whether or not parking lots and a public beach can both be accommodated with the rising frequency of flooding, and in 2012 the Fish and Wildlife Service began working on a 15-year, long-term management plan. A proposal to move the recreational beach area north with limited parking areas to be supplemented with a shuttle service and satellite parking in Chincoteague has been criticized by Chincoteague officials, who say the plan threatens the town's economic viability as tourists could potentially find the situation unattractive. Park officials however oppose "hard engineering solutions" like sea walls and pumping in offshore sand to rebuild the eroding beaches, citing the natural instability of barrier islands and policies preventing the interference of natural processes within the refuge.

==== Future relocation ====
In 2023, as part of the Nationally Significant Federal Lands and Tribal Transportation Projects Program, 17.7 million dollars was awarded to relocate the recreational beach 1.5 miles north. A new access road will be built, along with four new parking lots, boardwalks, and other facilities designed to better withstand extreme weather events without negatively affecting tourism.

=== Chincoteague ponies ===
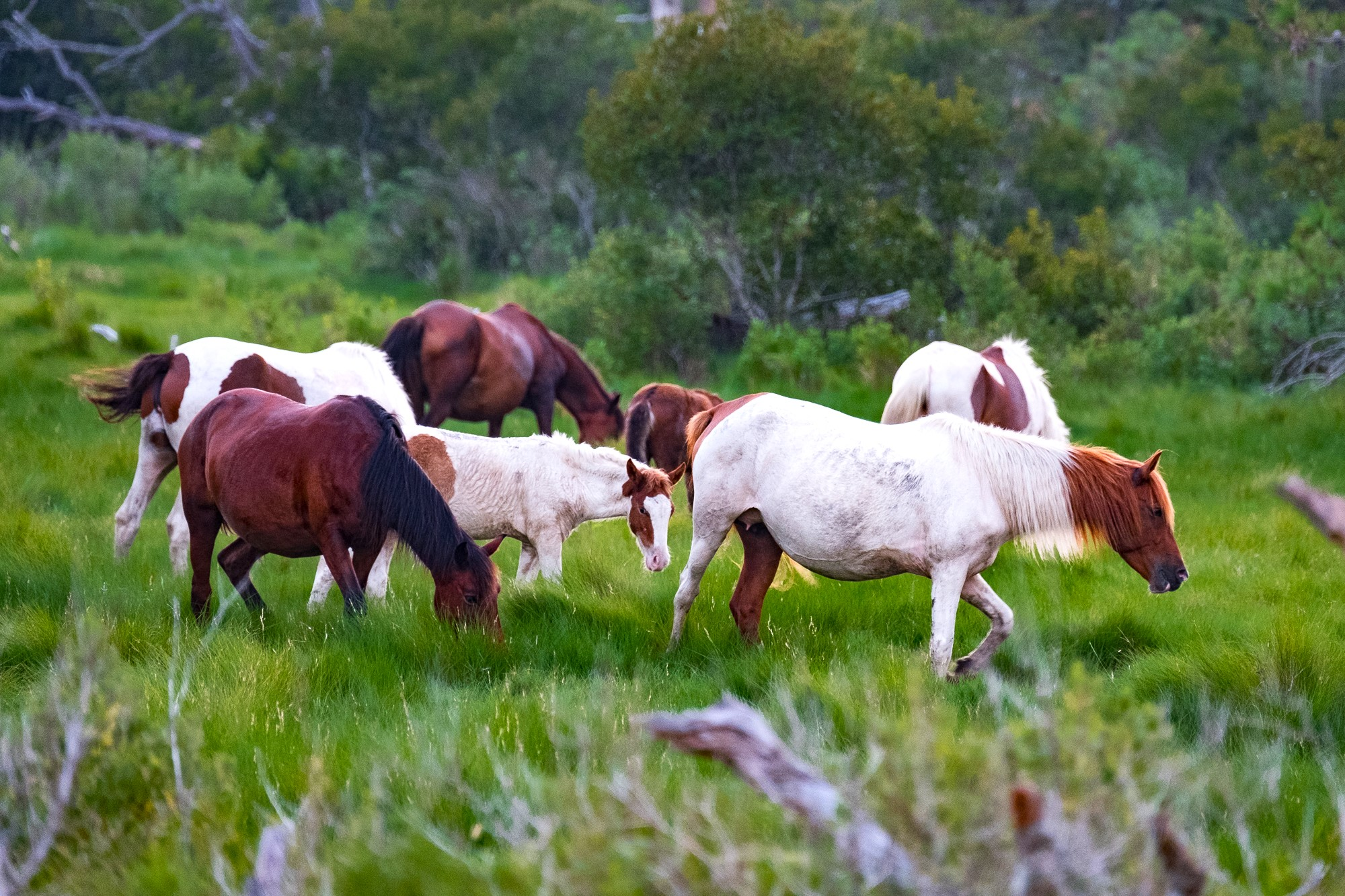
Ponies in the Chincoteague National Wildlife Refuge

The refuge is home to Virginia's herd of approximately 150 Chincoteague ponies, which grazes within a large fenced area. In late July each year, members of the Chincoteague Volunteer Fire Company—which owns the ponies—who have experience in horse wrangling round up the herd and corral them. On the final Wednesday before the final Thursday of each July, at slack tide, the ponies swim the channel between Assateague Island and Chincoteague Island, where the herd is moved to a coral at Chincoteague's carnival grounds ahead of a foal auction, which keeps the herd's size in check. The event sees Chincoteague's population increase tenfold for the event and people often gather to view the swim hours in advance. After the auction, the ponies return to the refuge.

=== Hunting ===
The main objective of the Chincoteague National Wildlife Refuge is to provide a safe habitat for all species. Hunting and harvesting the surplus of animals is one tool used to control the population of some species of big game and waterfowl. The Chincoteague National Wildlife Refuge manages its hunt through a permit system. For specific hunting regulations, visit the Virginia Department of Game & Inland Fisheries.

=== Visitors Center ===
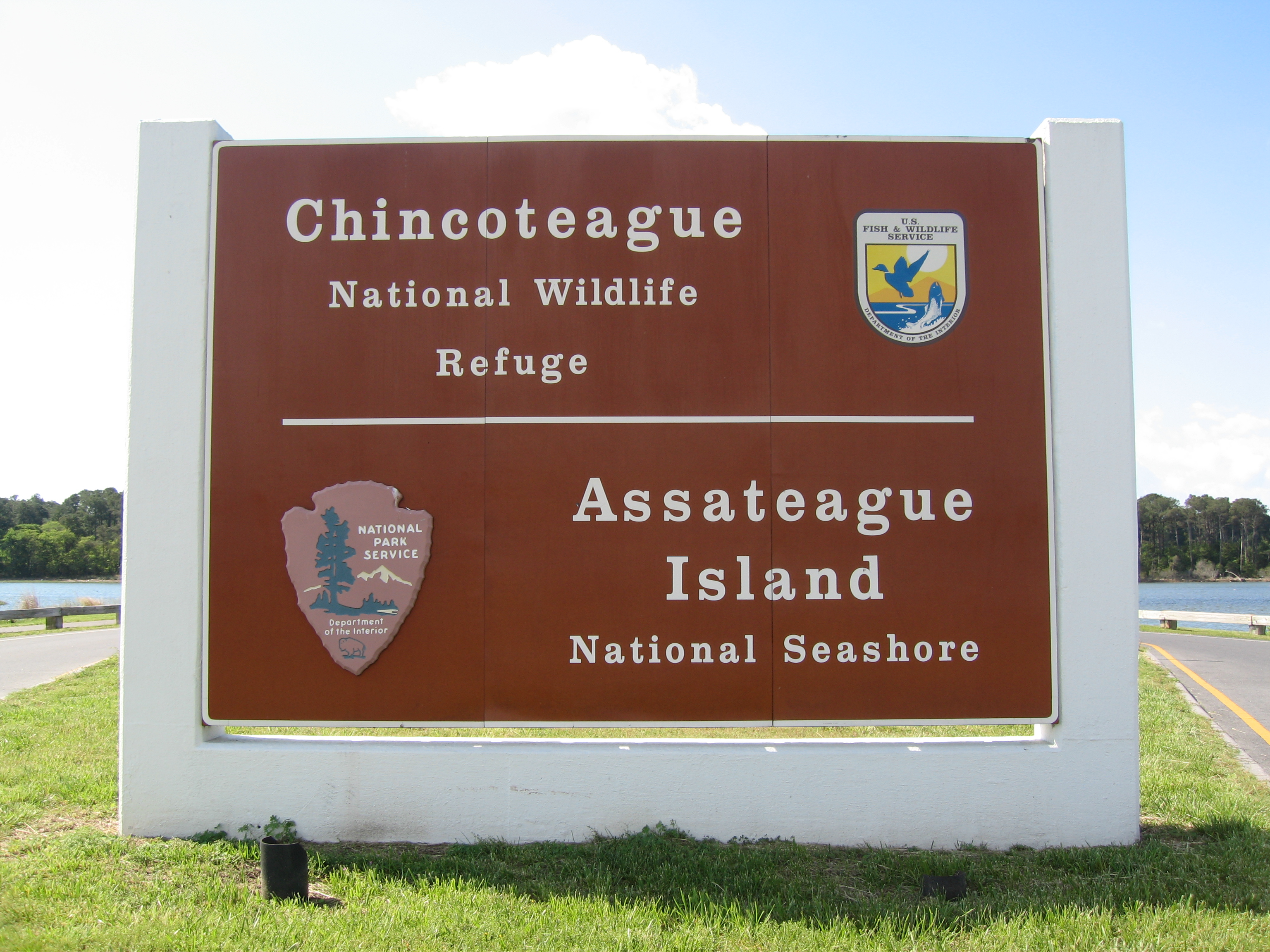
Chincoteague National Wildlife Refuge sign at entrance to Assateague Island

The Herbert H. Bateman Educational and Administrative Center opened in October 2003. Visitors can go to the center to purchase passes, pick up maps, and ask questions of the staff. The visitor center was built with several sources of sustainable and renewable energy. Geothermal energy provides heating and cooling to the building, while solar panels on the roof also provide energy. The floors and ceiling are made from recycled materials such as tires, bamboo, and aspen wood. A variety of exhibits within the center give information to visitors on the history of the refuge, and plants and animals to be found there. The Herbert H. Bateman Educational and Administrative Center is open seven days a week between 9 a.m. and 4 p.m. in the spring, fall, and winter, and between 9 a.m. and 5 p.m. during the summer.

== Geography ==
Chincoteague National Wildlife Refuge is located on the southern end of Assateague Island, an oblong-shaped barrier island that runs along the east coast of Maryland down to the northeast coast of Virginia. Chincoteague Bay lies between Assateague Island and the Delmarva Peninsula, and the smaller Assateague Bay separates Assateague Island from Chincoteague Island. The wildlife refuge contains multiple environments which house thousands of organisms. Since the island's ecology is so varied, it is an integral site for the protection and restoration of multiple species of organisms. Since the island is a little closer to the Atlantic Ocean than the mainland, Assateague typically feels the full force of tropical storms before the mainland does. It serves as a barrier for the mainland by helping drain energy from the storm and preventing further absorption of moisture into the air.

== Climate ==
The average highs for the summer months, June through September, range between 81 °F (27 °C) and 85 °F (29 °C). The average low is between 63 °F (17 °C) and 68 °F (20 °C) as opposed to the average high for the spring and fall seasons which is roughly 64 °F (18 °C) with an average low of 47 °F (8 °C). Winter has an average high around 51 °F (11 °C) with an average low of 34 °F (1 °C). Rainfall averages 3.68 inches (93 mm) per month and typically peaks in the spring and fall seasons. On average the warmest month is July and the highest recorded temperature was 102 °F (39 °C) in 1999. During the summer, humidity is a factor along with heat that may make being outside uncomfortable; especially since there is an abundance of moisture coming from the surrounding waters. January is on average the coldest month, the lowest recorded temperature was −2 °F (−19 °C) in 1982.

== Ecology ==
Chincoteague Refuge has several habitats ranging from the beach to the marshes.

=== Beach ===
Beach plants such as the threatened seabeach amaranth grow exposed to shifting sands, limited quantities of fresh water, salt water, and extreme wind and temperature. In some cases the entire community can be covered by tidal surges. The beach's primary function is to feed the hundreds of thousands of shorebirds that migrate to the area every year. The shorebirds on the beach often become the main source of food for peregrine falcons.

=== Freshwater areas ===
There are freshwater wetlands on Assateague Island, although they are brackish instead of fresh, and are normally inhabited by plants with low salt water tolerance. Some of the refuge contains manmade freshwater areas called "moist soil management units or impoundments". Fourteen of these areas cover 2,623 acres (1,061 ha), provide submerging and emergent wetland vegetation as food for waterfowl and habitat for other water birds.

=== Shrubs ===
This area extends north and south on the barrier flats and backdunes. The shrubs gradually merge in the east with dune grasses and in the west with marshes or forests. This is mostly inhabited by migrating and nesting songbirds, as well as migrating monarch butterflies.

=== Maritime forest ===
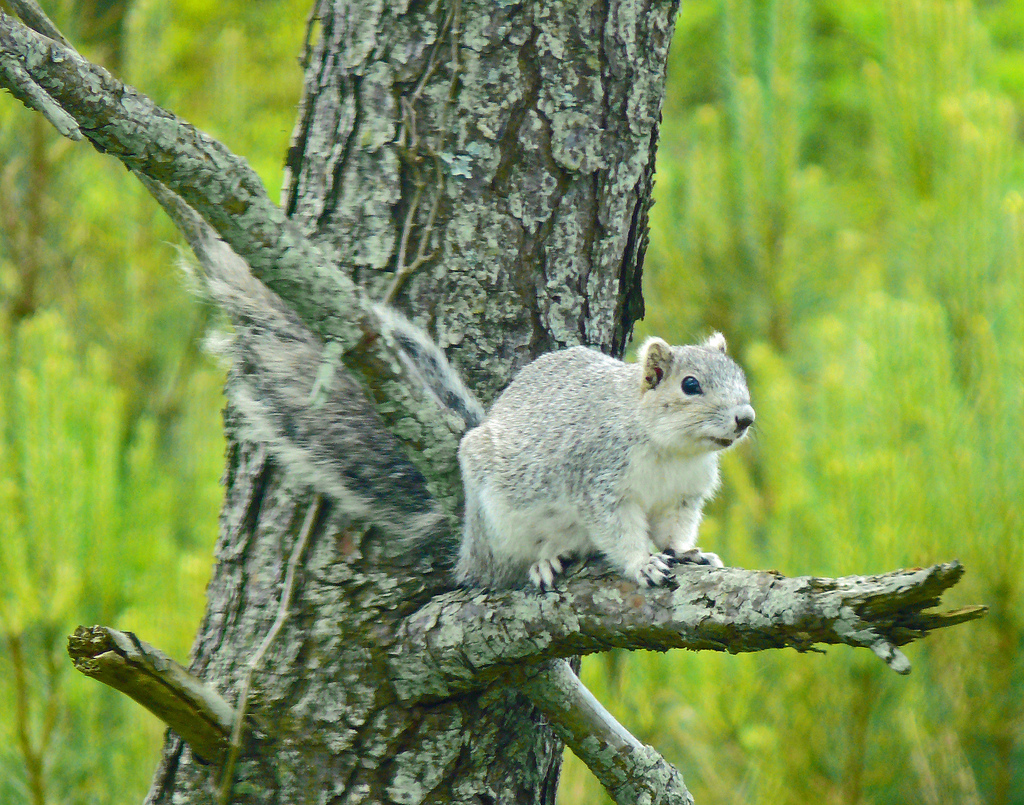
Delmarva Fox Squirrel

The formerly endangered Delmarva fox squirrel, white-tailed deer, sika deer, and raccoons are just a few of the animals that inhabit the forest. The forest occurs in large clusters on old dunes, west of the shrub areas and impoundments. These parts of the island have been the most stable over time.

=== Dunes ===
These dunes serve as a primary line of defense against storm surges, protecting habitats of other wildlife from being lost to the salt water. The dunes function as nesting areas for the threatened piping plover and other shorebirds. The sand dunes are home to many organisms such as the ghost crab, red fox and raccoons. These areas typically appear barren, but this is only because many of the animals are hiding for fear of being preyed upon.

=== Salt marshes ===
The regular flooding from the tide influences the distribution of salt marsh plants. These salt marshes can be found to the west of the barrier islands. They are home to black ducks, clapper rails, and other species.

== Fauna of Chincoteague ==
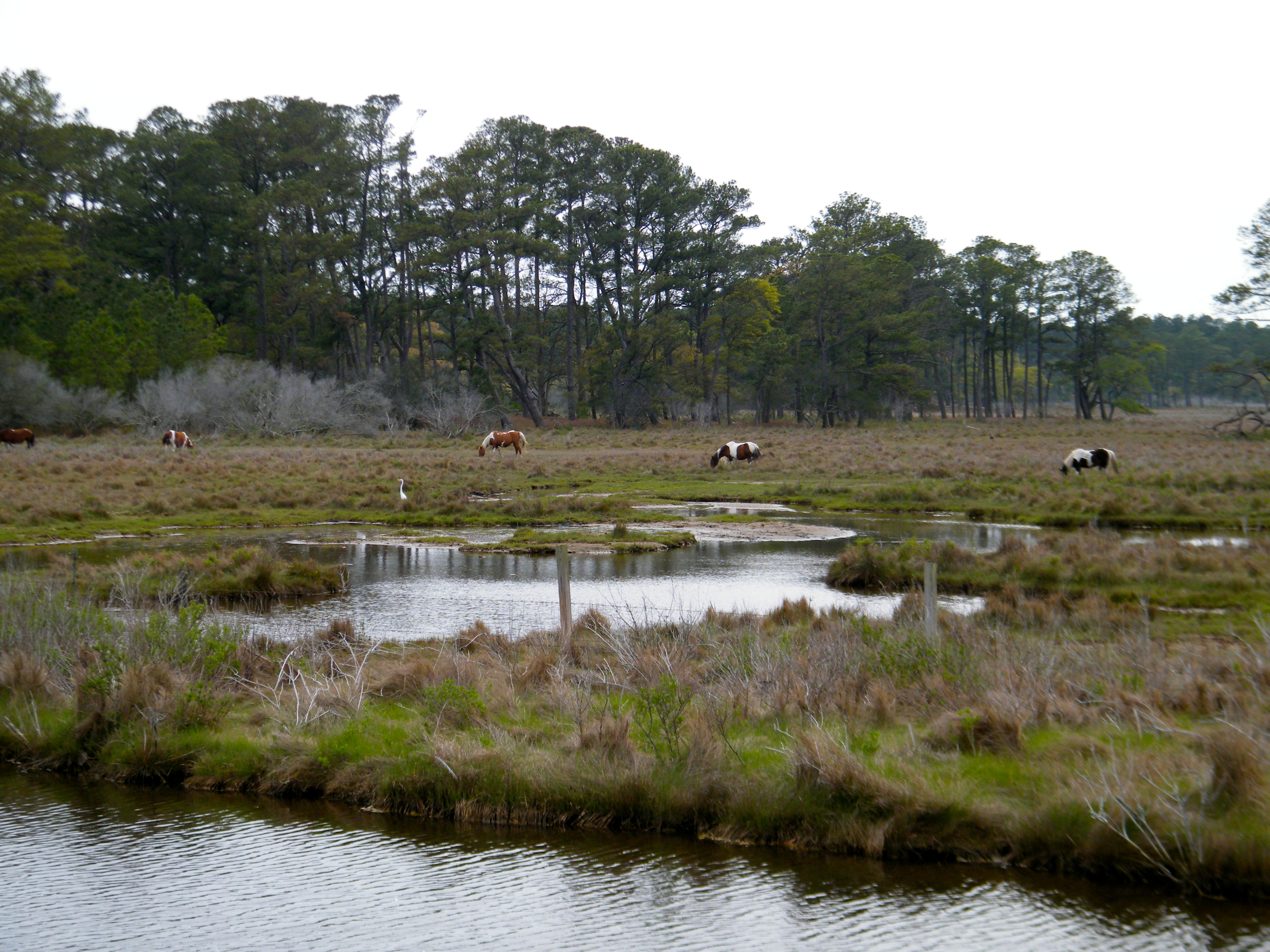
Feral ponies at the refuge

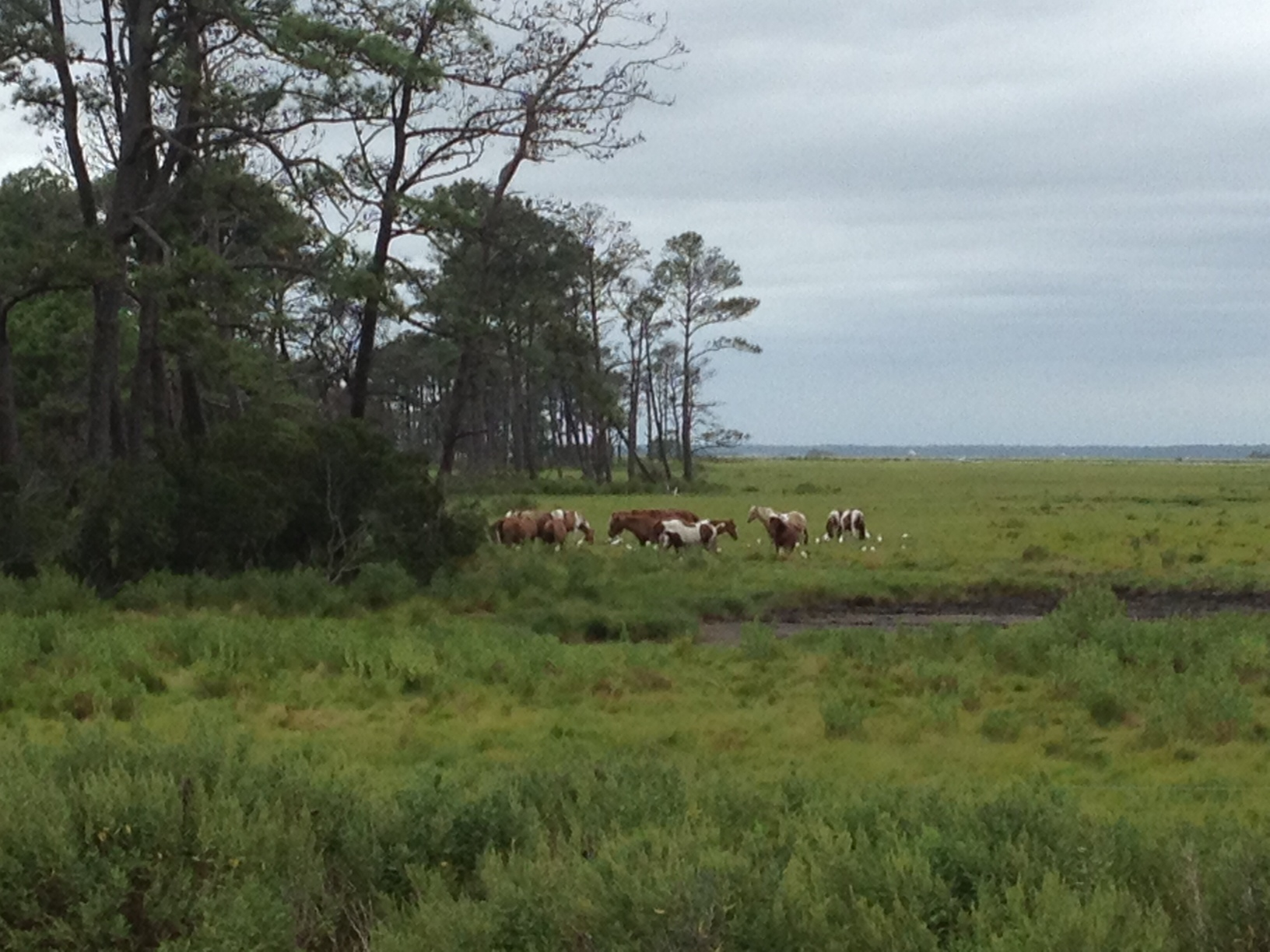
Wild ponies near Beach Access Road

- Merlin (Falco columbarius): The merlin is a species of falcon that inhabits Assateague Island. Merlins have been documented to disguise themselves by imitating characteristics of a pigeon or woodpecker in order to ambush its prey. It has also been known to be aggressively territorial, even against other birds of prey.
- Piping plover (Charadrius melodus): Piping plovers migrate between the United States and the Gulf of Mexico between seasons, but the time spent in the Assateague State Park is used to breed. Piping plover eggs often fall prey to raccoons, gulls, or foxes.
- Brown pelican (Pelecanus occidentalis): Brown pelicans are specialized hunters. They use their enormous bill and expandable pouch to dive into the water to capture fish. They resurface to feed on the fish and take flight again. They consume approximately 4 pounds (1.8 kg) of fish a day. This breed of pelican lays two to four eggs after it mates. They typically exist in colonies.
- Sika deer (Cervus nippon): Sika elk typically inhabit the sand dune areas and marshes within Assateague. They were originally introduced from Japan or eastern Asia. They often behave like larger North American Elk and display amazing battles between potential male mates during mating season. There are multiple subspecies of sika that exist throughout Asia, but many have gone extinct and therefore have been transplanted into other parts of the world to resuscitate the population.
- Red fox (Vulpes vulpes): Red foxes are typically active at night throughout Assateague. They are commonly spotted on the shoreline. They use their finely tuned ears to detect prey such as mice that hide beneath the snow or sand. As a result, they are effective in controlling the rodent populations. Red foxes have a short life span, but some have been recorded to survive up to the age of 14.
- Atlantic horseshoe crab (Limulus polyphemus): Horseshoe crabs have barely changed from their 200 million-year-old ancestors. They mainly inhabit the shore areas for calmer waters. This species is a marine chelicerate arthropod, rather than a crab, and has a strange similarity to spiders due to its multiple pairs of eyes. Horseshoe crabs typically feed on razor clams and other shellfish, and they are hunted by many species of shore birds as well as trout, flounder and true crabs.
- Black skimmer (Rynchops niger): Black skimmers are specialized hunters due to the way they use their beaks. Both portions of the beak are partly colored black, but the lower mandible of the black skimmer is longer than the upper mandible and is used to skim across the surface of the water, thereby scooping up any unsuspecting fish. This species of bird is currently marked as a threatened species. They typically breed in colonies on beaches and lay approximately three to five eggs.
- Wild ponies: The Virginia herd of ponies is owned by the Chincoteague Volunteer Fire Company, who hold a carnival during Pony Penning to raise funds. Each year the Virginia herd is rounded up for the pony penning and auction. The Pony Penning began as a way for livestock owners to claim and harness their loose herds. By the 1700s it had become an annual event. Pony Penning is held in July during the Chincoteague Volunteer Fireman's Carnival.

== See also ==
- List of National Wildlife Refuges of the United States

== Notes ==
This article incorporates public domain material from websites or documents of the United States Fish and Wildlife Service.
