= Island Creamery =

Maryland-based ice cream parlor chain

Coordinates: 37.9353°N 75.3672°W

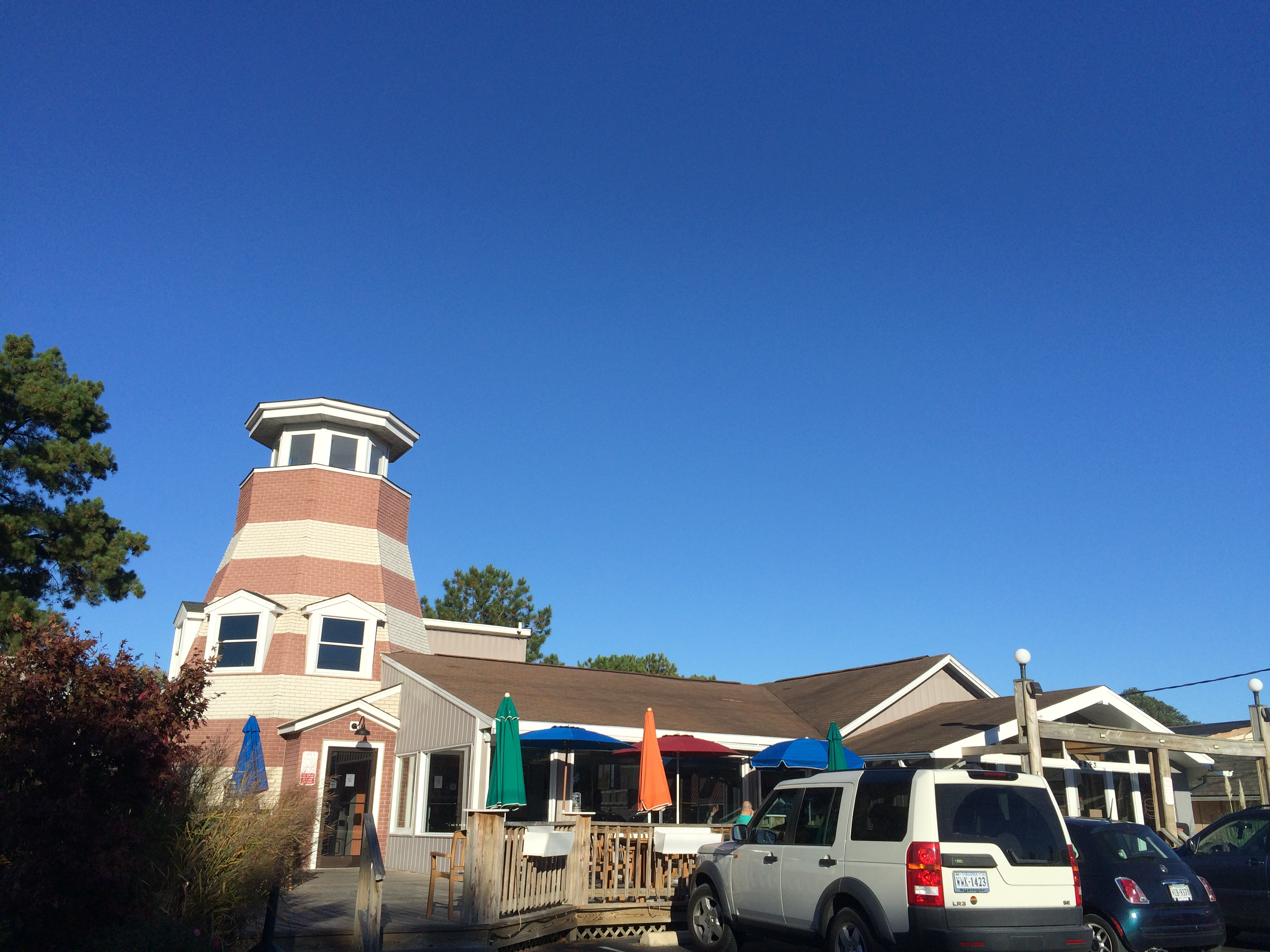
- Company type: Private
- Genre: Restaurants
- Founded: 1975; 51 years ago
- Founders: Bob and Nancy Conklin
- Headquarters: United States
- Number of locations: 3
- Area served: Delmarva Peninsula
- Products: Ice Cream, Frozen Desserts
- Owner: Kelly Conklin
- Website: islandcreamery.net

Island Creamery is a chain of ice cream parlors located on the Delmarva Peninsula. In 2014, TripAdvisor ranked Island Creamery as the #1 Ice Cream Parlor in the United States.

== Products ==
Island Creamery offers a variety of frozen foods at every location, including Homemade Ice Cream, Ice Cream Cakes, and Milkshakes.

=== Ice Cream Flavors ===
Island Creamery is known locally for its large assortment of unique flavors, including Bourbon Caramel Crunch, Cake Batter, and Wallops Rocket Fuel, a flavor named after the Wallops Island Flight Facility.

== Locations ==
Island Creamery operates 3 locations on Delmarva:

- Chincoteague, Virginia - Original Location, opened in 1975
- Berlin, Maryland - Opened in 2017
- Salisbury, Maryland - Opened in 2018
