= Beebe Ranch =

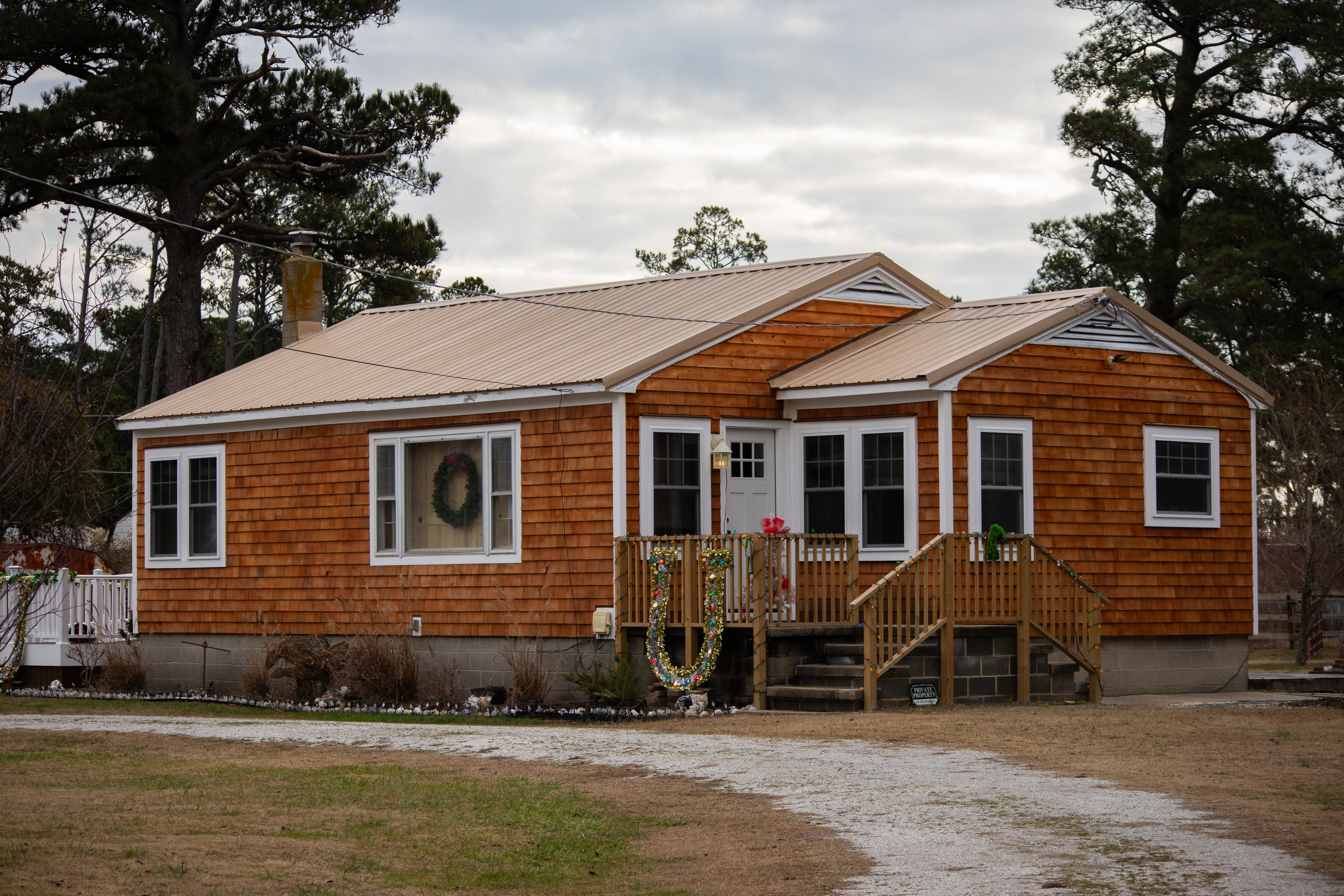
- The Beebe House in 2024
- Established: 2001
- Location: Chincoteague, Virginia, United States
- Type: Equestrian museum
- Website: facebook.com/Beeberanch

Beebe Ranch is an American horse ranch and museum located at 3062 Ridge Road, Chincoteague, Virginia. It was originally founded as a horse farm by the Beebe family sometime prior to 1923.

The Ranch closed in 2010 when its owner, Billy Beebe, was deployed to Afghanistan during the War in Afghanistan as a member of the National Guard of the United States; it reopened on July 27, 2016. The museum focuses on two Chincoteague Ponies, Misty (1946 – 1972) and her foal Stormy (1962 – 1993), featured in the children's books Misty of Chincoteague (1947) and Stormy, Misty's Foal (1963) by pony book author Marguerite Henry.

Misty and Stormy resided at the ranch, and their taxidermically preserved figures were displayed at the museum for years before being relocated to the Museum of Chincoteague Island. Misty had stayed in the house at the ranch during the Ash Wednesday Storm of 1962, a major winter storm that struck the coast and became the basis for the book Stormy, Misty's Foal.

In 2016, the first foal and Misty of Chincoteague descendant since 1972 was born on Beebe Ranch. The black pinto filly was born to 5th-generation Misty descendant and Chincoteague pony Nightmist's Little Angel - a bay pinto mare with some Thoroughbred and American Paint Horse blood - and was named "Angel's Stormy Drizzle" (or "Drizzle") by her owners, Billy and Bonnie Beebe. The foal is the great-great-granddaughter of Stormy, out of Misty.

In 2019, the Beebee Ranch lost their horse barn in a fire. Misty lived in the barn from 1957 until her death in 1972, and several of her descendants were also being kept there. No humans or animals were reported injured in the fire.

In February 2023, the Beebe family decided to sell Beebe Ranch after over 100 years of owning the property. They considered offers from several developers, but declined offers that were not focused on preserving the farm. As of April 2023, the 10-acre property is currently under contract to be sold to the Museum of Chincoteague Island and the Misty of Chincoteague Foundation for $625,000 to preserve the location as a historic site.

== See also ==
- List of historical horses
- List of museums in Virginia
