= Misty of Chincoteague (novel) =

Children's book by Marguerite Henry

- First edition
- Author: Marguerite Henry
- Genre: Children's novel, pony book
- Publisher: Rand McNally
- Publication date: 1947
- Publication place: United States
- Pages: 173 pp. (first ed.)
- OCLC: 176811
- LC Class: PZ10.3.H43 Mg
- Followed by: Sea Star: Orphan of Chincoteague; Stormy, Misty's Foal; Misty's Twilight

Misty of Chincoteague is a children's novel written by author Marguerite Henry, illustrated by Wesley Dennis, and published by Rand McNally in 1947. Set in the island town of Chincoteague, Virginia, the book was inspired by the real-life story of the Beebe family and their efforts to raise a Chincoteague pony filly born to a wild horse, who would later become known as Misty of Chincoteague. It was one of the runners-up for the annual Newbery Medal, now called Newbery Honor Books. The 1961 film Misty was based on the book.

== Plot ==
Misty of Chincoteague begins with an account of the wreck of a Spanish galleon off the coast of Virginia. The ponies in the hold of the galleon swim to Assateague Island, and become feral as the years and centuries pass.

The book then tells the story of two children, Paul and Maureen Beebe, who live with their grandparents on Chincoteague Island. Paul and Maureen work to earn money to buy a Chincoteague pony mare named the Phantom, who has escaped the roundup men on Pony Penning Day for the past two years. Paul and Maureen save enough to buy Phantom, and Paul is able to capture her on the roundup because she is slowed down by her new foal, Misty. A man from the mainland, however, buys the pair of ponies for his son before Paul and Maureen can give their money to the fire chief. Paul and Maureen are distressed, but they end up being able to buy Phantom and Misty because the original buyer's son won a colt in the yearly raffle, and then decided he did not need another pony.

Paul and Maureen break Phantom to ride, and the next year, Paul races her on Pony Penning Day. Phantom wins, but the next day becomes distressed when she sees the herd she once belonged to, led by a stallion called Pied Piper, being released to swim back to Assateague. Paul releases Phantom, and she joins Pied Piper and the herd as they return to freedom on their ancestral island. Misty remains behind with Paul and Maureen.

== Inspiration for novel ==
Misty was inspired by a real-life Chincoteague pony of the same name, Misty of Chincoteague. The actual Misty was foaled in 1946 on Chincoteague Island at the Beebe Ranch, not in the wild on Assateague Island, as told in Henry's novel. As in the book, however, her sire was a chestnut pinto named Pied Piper, and her dam was a black pinto called Phantom. Although these horses also were domesticated in real life, they too provided inspiration to Henry for the wild ponies portrayed in the novel.

Misty was a palomino pinto, whose coloration and markings included a large patch of white on her side shaped much like the United States. Her hoof prints are impressed in the concrete of the sidewalk outside the Roxy Movie Theatre in Chincoteague.

After being purchased by Marguerite Henry as a weanling in November 1946, and spending her early life at Henry's Wayne, Illinois home, she was moved back to the Beebe Ranch in Chincoteague in 1957. A goodbye party with over 300 children and 160 adults in attendance was held by Henry in Wayne for Misty when she left for Chincoteague.

Back in Chincoteague, Misty had three foals: Phantom Wings in 1960, Wisp O' Mist in 1961, and Stormy, a chestnut pinto filly with a blaze in the shape of a crescent moon on her forehead, in 1962. As of 2015, there were almost 200 known descendants of Misty.

Paul Beebe died in a car accident in 1957 at the age of 21. Grandfather Clarence Beebe died two months after Paul's accident. Grandmother Ida Beebe died in 1960. Maureen Beebe died in 2019, at the age of 81, having become a familiar presence in Chincoteague.

Misty died in her sleep at 9:30 AM on October 16, 1972, at the age of 26. She was taxidermied, as was her foal Stormy, who died in 1993. They can be seen at the Museum of Chincoteague Island.

The Misty of Chincoteague Foundation was formed by Marguerite Henry and Rebecca Guisti in 1990, with the two-fold mission of preserving Misty's legacy, and promoting reading by children. Funds were raised to commission a statue of Misty, sculpted by Brian Maughan, to be erected on Chincoteague, which was formally unveiled on July 29, 1997. An identical casting of the Maughan statue was also placed at Kentucky Horse Park in Lexington, Kentucky.

== Marguerite Henry's "Misty" series ==
Marguerite Henry with Misty

- Misty of Chincoteague, illustrated by Wesley Dennis (1947)
- Sea Star: Orphan of Chincoteague, illus. by Wesley Dennis (Rand McNally, 1949), sequel novel, OCLC 4669796
- Misty, the Wonder Pony, by Misty, Herself, illus. by Clare McKinley (1956), picture book
- Stormy, Misty's Foal (1963), illus. by Wesley Dennis, sequel novel
- A Pictorial Life Story of Misty, drawings by Wesley Dennis (Rand McNally, 1976), OCLC 2423734
- Misty's Twilight, illus. by Karen Haus Grandpré (Macmillan, 1992), OCLC 25007971

In the second novel, Sea Star, published only two years after the original, Misty is "sold to be shared with children the country over" and the Beebe children rescue a "tiny orphaned colt" after the Pony Penning.

The third novel, Stormy, Misty's Foal, was published in 1963. It tells of the Ash Wednesday Storm of 1962 on Chincoteague, and the birth of Misty's last foal, Stormy. Misty and Stormy had made appearances at theaters and schools in the area to help raise funds for replenishment of the herds on Assateague in the aftermath of the 1962 storm.

The fourth novel, Misty's Twilight, was published after Henry's 90th birthday, and almost 30 years after the third. Kirkus Reviews observed that it was "billed as fiction but more like a fictionalization concerning one of Misty's descendants", and also concluded that "this adult-centered narrative about an affluent doctor—whose troubles with her horse are always addressed by hiring yet another trainer—may be authentic, it will be of interest mostly to those who relish every crumb about Misty's family".

== 50th anniversary release ==
For the 50th anniversary in 1997 of the original novel, only a month before Henry's death, Simon & Schuster released a diary garnished with quotations from Misty of Chincoteague and new illustrations by Bill Farnsworth (Little Simon, October 1997); ISBN 9780689817694.

== Misty's legacy in other literature ==
Several of the real-life Misty's descendants have been featured in books by other authors, in addition to Henry:

- Windy of Chincoteague by Ronald Keiper (1987) — small non-fiction book about Misty's first granddaughter Windy.
- Pony Promise by Lois Szymanski (1996) — fiction, but based on the true story of Windy nursing her half-sister Misty II along with her own foal Cyclone, because of Stormy rejecting Misty II.
- Nightmist the Miracle Pony by Jessie-Ann Friend (2005) — children's book about Misty's great-grandson Nightmist.
- The Forgotten Pony by Jessie Ann-Friend (2007) — children's book about Misty's great-grandson, Rainy's Boy.

A series of children's books by Misty family pony-breeder Kendy Allen debuted in 2006. The series includes:

- Misty's Heart of the Storm
- Misty's Black Mist and the Christmas Parade
- A Chincoteague Pony Named Misty III
- Ember's Story, The Misty Miracle Pony

== See also ==
- List of fictional horses
- List of historical horses
