= Chincoteague, Virginia =

- Town
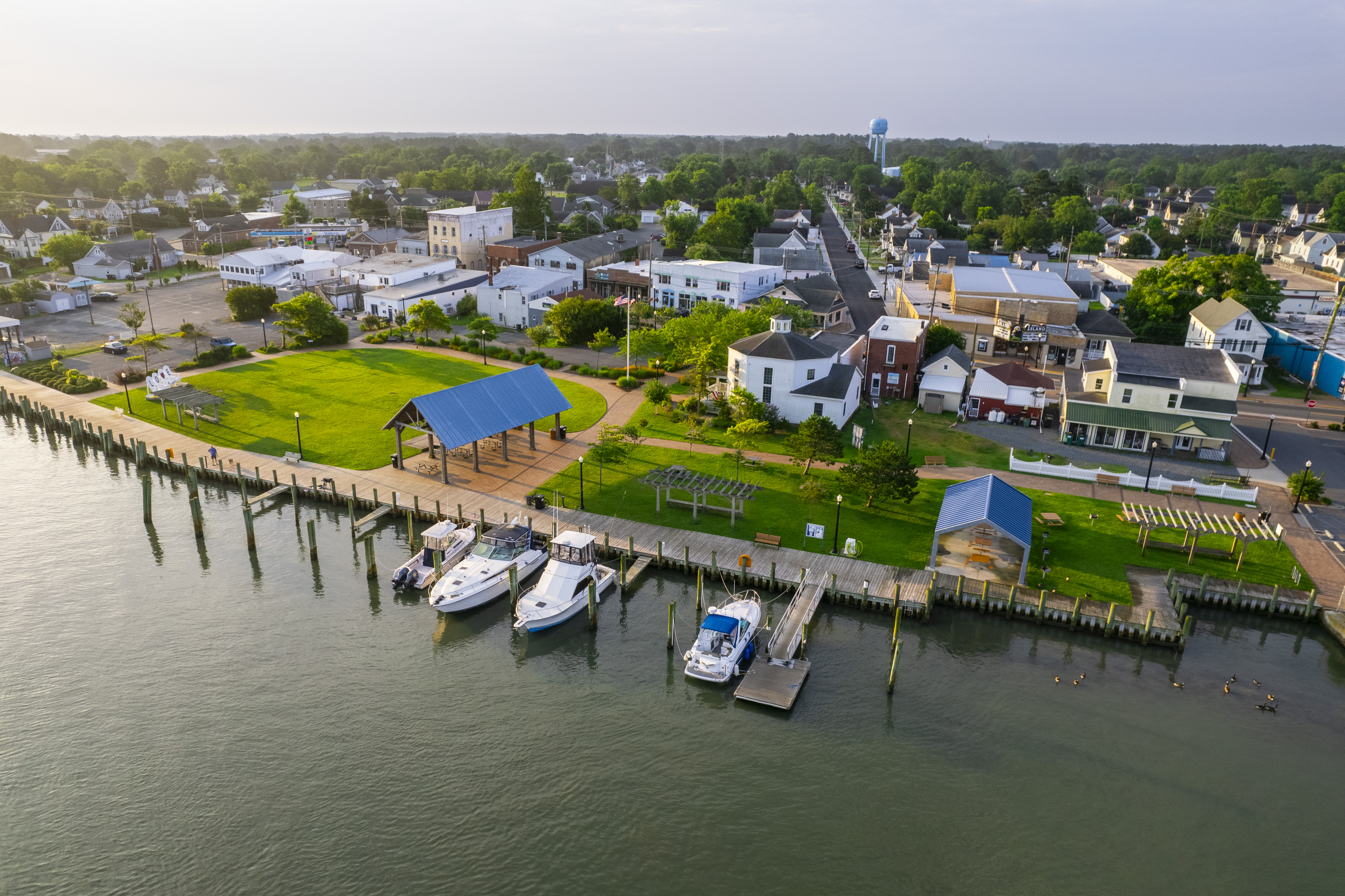
- West side of Chincoteague at sunrise.

- Flag Seal

- Location of Chincoteague in Accomack County, Virginia and of Accomack County in Virginia

- Location in Virginia and the United States Chincoteague (the United States)
- Coordinates: 37°56′5″N 75°22′4″W
- Country: United States
- State: Virginia
- County: Accomack
- Incorporated: 1908

Government
  - Mayor: Denise Bowden

Area
  - Total: 37.48 sq mi (97.07 km^{2})
  - Land: 9.26 sq mi (23.98 km^{2})
  - Water: 28.22 sq mi (73.09 km^{2})
- Elevation: 3 ft (0.91 m)

Population (2020)
  - Total: 3,344
  - Estimate (2019): 2,875
  - Density: 310.5/sq mi (119.87/km^{2})
- Time zone: UTC−5 (Eastern (EST))
  - Summer (DST): UTC−4 (EDT)
- ZIP Code: 23336
- Area codes: 757, 948
- FIPS code: 51-16512
- GNIS feature ID: 1492764
- Website: Official website

Chincoteague (/ˌʃɪŋkəˈtiːɡ/ or /ˈʃɪŋkətiːɡ/) is a town in Accomack County, Virginia, United States. The town includes the whole of Chincoteague Island and an area of adjacent water. The population was 3,344 at the 2020 census. The town is a tourist gateway to the Chincoteague National Wildlife Refuge on adjacent Assateague Island, the location of a popular recreational beach and home of the Virginia herd of Chincoteague Ponies. These ponies and the annual Pony Swim are the subject of Marguerite Henry's 1947 children's book Misty of Chincoteague, which was made into the 1961 family film Misty, filmed on location.

== Geography ==
Chincoteague is located at 37°56′5″N 75°22′4″W (37.934673, −75.367805). According to the United States Census Bureau, the town has a total area of 37.3 square miles (96.7 km^{2}), of which 9.1 square miles (23.6 km^{2}) is land and 28.2 square miles (73.1 km^{2}), or 75.58%, is water. It lies at an elevation of three feet.

== History ==
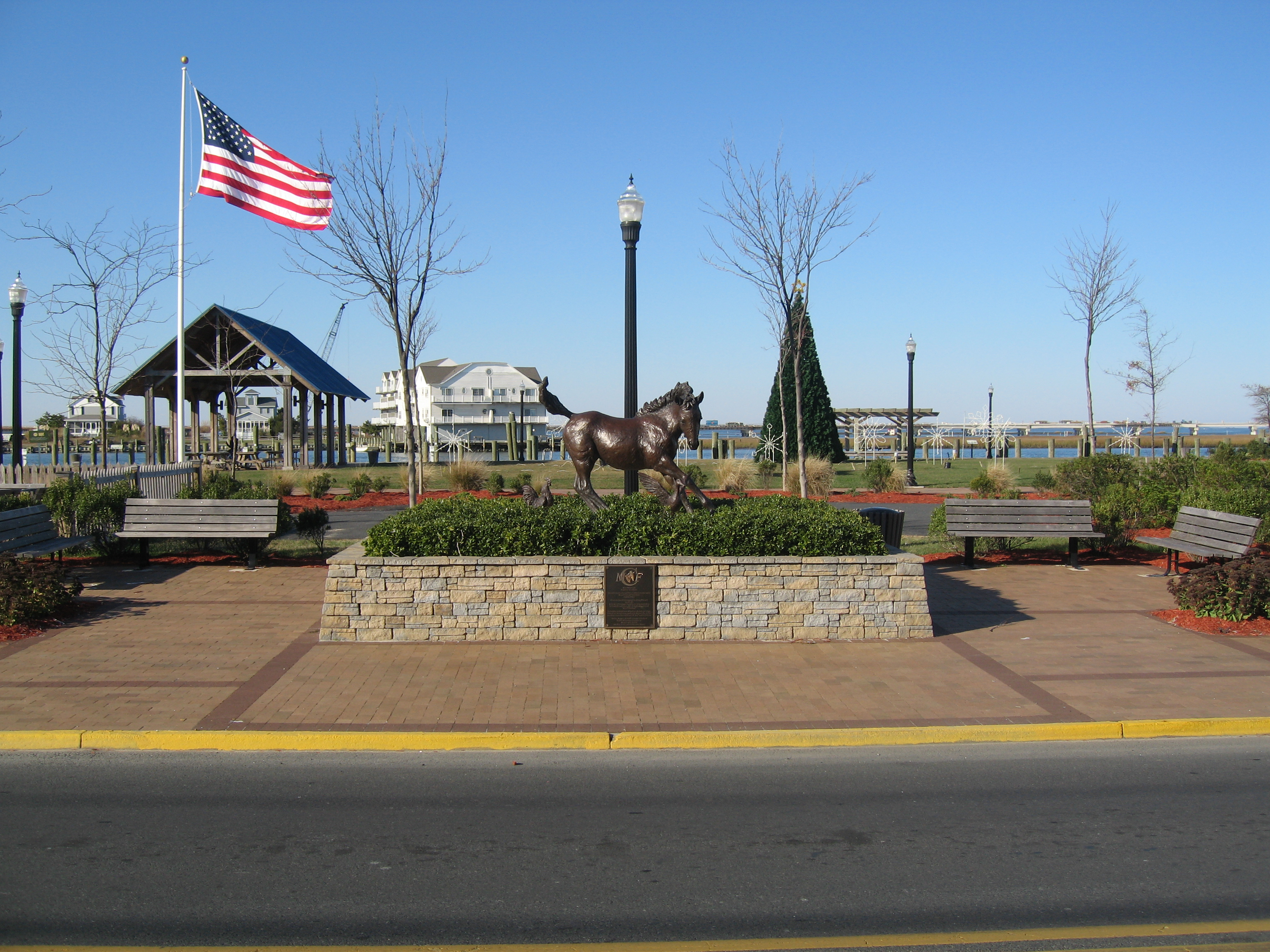
Misty of Chincoteague statue on Main Street

Chincoteague was a barrier island until the mid-1800s, when Assateague migrated so far south that it shielded Chincoteague from the ocean. The year of 1650 marks the first land grant issued on Chincoteague Island, for 1,500 acres (6.1 km^{2}). Daniel Jenifer became the first English landowner. In 1671, settlers came to the island, and by 1672 there were large farms by Bishops, Bowdens, Jesters and Tarrs. By 1838, there were 36 houses on the island. In 1861, with the Civil War looming following the attack on Fort Sumter, the island voted 132–2 not to secede from the Union and against slavery. The town saw minor action in the war via the Battle of Cockle Creek, which was fought in the bay in 1861.

The Native American name for the island is Gingoteague, and the name of the town "Chincoteague" first appeared in the Decisions of the United States Board on Geographic Names in 1943.

In 1962, a major nor'easter winter storm, the Ash Wednesday Storm, struck the coast. The town was completely underwater, and went for days without electricity. The storm destroyed almost all structures on Assateague Island, where development was just beginning. Following this, most of the island was preserved from development as Assateague Island National Seashore in 1965.

The Assateague Lighthouse and Captain Timothy Hill House are listed on the National Register of Historic Places.

In March 2020, the town received critical flood protection funding ($53.9 million).

=== Chincoteague ponies ===
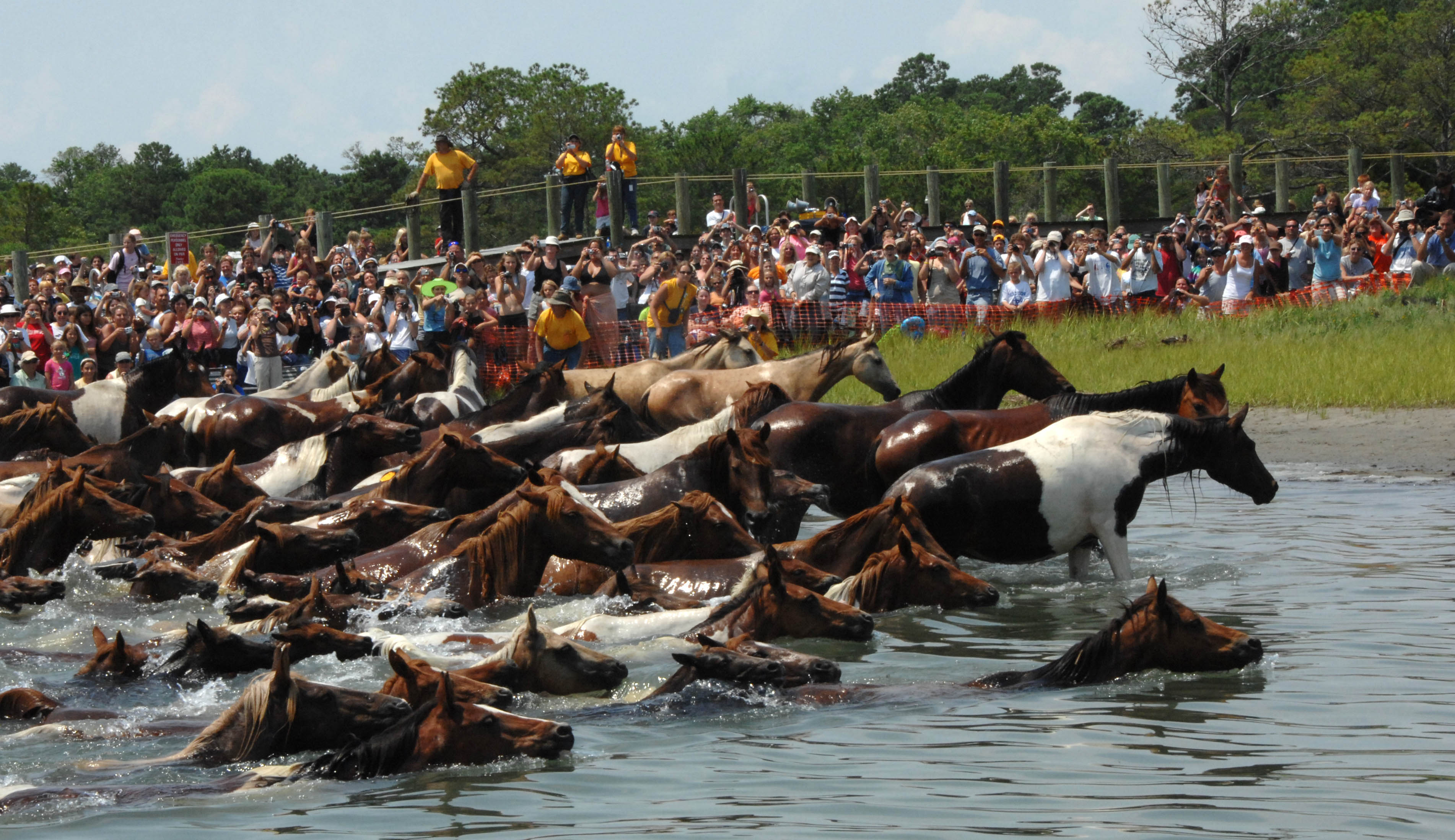
The 82nd Annual Chincoteague Pony Swim

Legend has it that the feral ponies on Assateague are descendants of survivors of a Spanish galleon that sank on its way to Spain during a storm in 1750 off the east coast, but the likelihood is that they are actually descended from domesticated stock, brought to the island by Eastern Shore farmers in the 17th century to avoid fencing requirements and taxation.

In the Pony Penning, which has been held annually since 1925, horses swim across the shallow water between the islands. At "slack tide" on the Wednesday before the last Thursday of every July, Chincoteague's "Saltwater Cowboys" herd the wild Chincoteague ponies from Assateague Island, across the Assateague Channel, to neighboring Chincoteague Island. If any animal is too small or weak to make the swim, it is placed on a barge and ferried over. All the horses are herded into large pens after running through the middle of town and down Main Street. Pony Penning takes place on the last consecutive Wednesday and Thursday in July. The actual swim occurs on Wednesday, the Chincoteague Volunteer Fire Company auctions that year's foals on Thursday, and on Friday the remaining ponies swim back to Assateague.

== Tourism ==
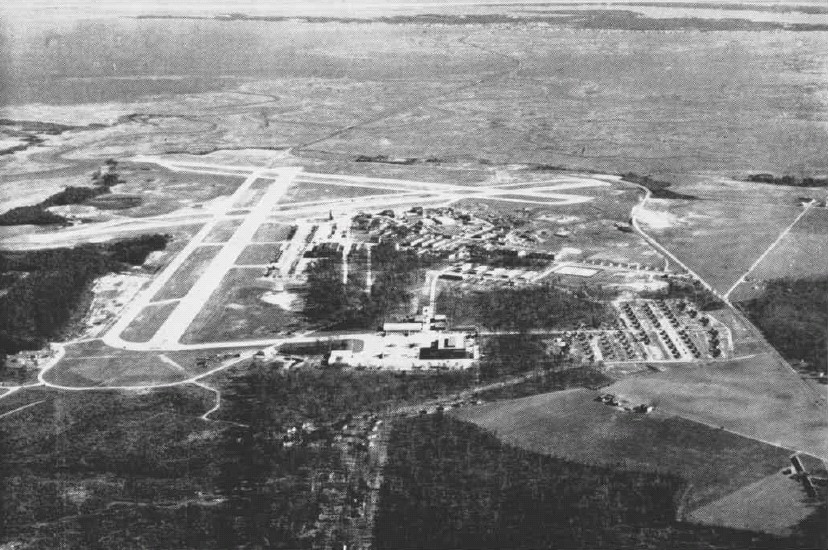
Aerial view of the Naval Auxiliary Air Station Chincoteague in the mid-1940s

The town features numerous small hotels, bed and breakfasts, and campgrounds that serve visitors to the region, such as those patronizing the beaches. The island also features many restaurants, miniature golf courses and ice cream parlors, including Island Creamery. The island contains two museums: Beebe Ranch, and the Museum of Chincoteague Island. With the designation of the nearby Wallops Flight Facility as the launch site for the Antares rocket and Cygnus cargo module used to resupply the International Space Station, there are large influxes of tourists whenever an Antares launch occurs.

== Demographics ==
Historical population
Census	Pop.	Note	%±
1910	1,419		—
1920	1,418		−0.1%
1930	2,130		50.2%
1940	2,142		0.6%
1950	2,724		27.2%
1960	2,131		−21.8%
1970	1,867		−12.4%
1980	1,607		−13.9%
1990	3,572		122.3%
2000	4,317		20.9%
2010	2,941		−31.9%
2020	3,344		13.7%

=== Racial and ethnic composition ===
Chincoteague town, Virginia – Racial and ethnic composition Note: the US Census treats Hispanic/Latino as an ethnic category. This table excludes Latinos from the racial categories and assigns them to a separate category. Hispanics/Latinos may be of any race.
Race / Ethnicity (NH = Non-Hispanic)	Pop 2000	Pop 2010	Pop 2020	% 2000	% 2010	% 2020
White alone (NH)	4,171	2,764	3,035	96.62%	93.98%	90.76%
Black or African American alone (NH)	41	21	28	0.95%	0.71%	0.84%
Native American or Alaska Native alone (NH)	12	8	8	0.28%	0.27%	0.24%
Asian alone (NH)	12	17	19	0.28%	0.58%	0.57%
Native Hawaiian or Pacific Islander alone (NH)	0	0	0	0.00%	0.00%	0.00%
Other race alone (NH)	8	2	7	0.19%	0.07%	0.21%
Mixed race or Multiracial (NH)	50	80	151	1.16%	2.72%	4.52%
Hispanic or Latino (any race)	23	49	96	0.53%	1.67%	2.87%
Total	4,317	2,941	3,344	100.00%	100.00%	100.00%

=== 2000 census ===
As of the census of 2000, there were 4,317 people, 2,068 households, and 1,244 families residing in the town. The population density was 448.2 people per square mile (173.1/km^{2}). There were 3,970 housing units at an average density of 412.2 per square mile (159.2/km^{2}). The racial makeup of the town was 96.92% White, 0.95% African American, 0.28% Native American, 0.28% Asian, 0.37% from other races, and 1.20% from two or more races. Hispanic or Latino of any race were 0.53% of the population.

There were 2,068 households, out of which 21.5% had children under the age of 18 living with them, 48.8% were married couples living together, 8.3% had a female householder with no husband present, and 39.8% were non-families. 33.8% of all households were made up of individuals, and 13.9% had someone living alone who was 65 years of age or older. The average household size was 2.08 and the average family size was 2.63.

In the town, the population was spread out, with 18.0% under the age of 18, 5.5% from 18 to 24, 24.7% from 25 to 44, 30.9% from 45 to 64, and 20.9% who were 65 years of age or older. The median age was 46 years. For every 100 females, there were 94.4 males. For every 100 females age 18 and over, there were 93.8 males.

The median income for a household in the town was $28,514, and the median income for a family was $33,425. Males had a median income of $27,075 versus $20,859 for females. The per capita income for the town was $20,367. About 9.7% of families and 12.7% of the population were below the poverty line, including 22.9% of those under age 18 and 9.4% of those age 65 or over.

== Climate ==
The climate in this area is characterized by hot, humid summers and generally mild to cool winters. According to the Köppen Climate Classification system, Chincoteague has a humid subtropical climate, abbreviated "Cfa" on climate maps.

Climate data for Wallops Island Flight Facility, Virginia (1991–2020 normals, (Note: Mean monthly maxima and minima (i.e. the highest and lowest temperature readings during an entire month or year) calculated based on data at said thread from 1991 to 2020.) extremes 1948–present)
Month	Jan	Feb	Mar	Apr	May	Jun	Jul	Aug	Sep	Oct	Nov	Dec	Year
Record high °F (°C)	79 (26)	79 (26)	86 (30)	93 (34)	97 (36)	100 (38)	102 (39)	100 (38)	96 (36)	93 (34)	82 (28)	78 (26)	102 (39)
Mean maximum °F (°C)	66 (19)	68 (20)	75 (24)	82 (28)	88 (31)	93 (34)	96 (36)	93 (34)	89 (32)	83 (28)	74 (23)	68 (20)	96 (36)
Mean daily maximum °F (°C)	46.2 (7.9)	48.5 (9.2)	54.5 (12.5)	64.3 (17.9)	72.7 (22.6)	81.3 (27.4)	86.1 (30.1)	84.2 (29.0)	78.7 (25.9)	69.1 (20.6)	58.8 (14.9)	50.5 (10.3)	66.2 (19.0)
Daily mean °F (°C)	37.9 (3.3)	39.8 (4.3)	45.8 (7.7)	55.1 (12.8)	64.1 (17.8)	73.2 (22.9)	78.2 (25.7)	76.5 (24.7)	70.8 (21.6)	60.2 (15.7)	49.7 (9.8)	42.0 (5.6)	57.8 (14.3)
Mean daily minimum °F (°C)	29.5 (−1.4)	31.1 (−0.5)	37.0 (2.8)	45.9 (7.7)	55.5 (13.1)	65.1 (18.4)	70.4 (21.3)	68.7 (20.4)	63.0 (17.2)	51.4 (10.8)	40.7 (4.8)	33.5 (0.8)	49.3 (9.6)
Mean minimum °F (°C)	12 (−11)	17 (−8)	22 (−6)	32 (0)	42 (6)	52 (11)	61 (16)	59 (15)	50 (10)	36 (2)	26 (−3)	19 (−7)	10 (−12)
Record low °F (°C)	0 (−18)	−1 (−18)	14 (−10)	26 (−3)	33 (1)	43 (6)	53 (12)	48 (9)	43 (6)	29 (−2)	19 (−7)	4 (−16)	−1 (−18)
Average precipitation inches (mm)	3.15 (80)	2.81 (71)	3.91 (99)	3.12 (79)	3.20 (81)	3.39 (86)	4.37 (111)	4.32 (110)	4.33 (110)	4.02 (102)	2.88 (73)	3.75 (95)	43.25 (1,099)
Average snowfall inches (cm)	3.5 (8.9)	2.3 (5.8)	0.7 (1.8)	0.2 (0.51)	0.0 (0.0)	0.0 (0.0)	0.0 (0.0)	0.0 (0.0)	0.0 (0.0)	0.0 (0.0)	0.0 (0.0)	1.7 (4.3)	8.4 (21)
Average precipitation days (≥ 0.01 in)	10.8	9.5	10.9	10.5	11.0	10.1	10.7	9.0	8.4	8.4	8.7	10.5	118.5
Average snowy days (≥ 0.1 in)	2.0	1.4	0.8	0.1	0.0	0.0	0.0	0.0	0.0	0.0	0.0	0.7	5.0
Source: NOAA

== Transportation ==
=== Major highway ===
- SR 175

=== Public transportation ===
STAR Transit provides public transit services, linking Chincoteague with Oak Hall and other communities in Accomack and Northampton counties on the Eastern Shore.

== Notable people ==
- Delbert "Cigar" Daisey, waterfowl decoy wood carver
- Bill Hinnant, actor on stage, film, and television; born in Chincoteague in 1935; drowned in 1978 in the Dominican Republic
- Skip Hinnant, actor and comedian, born in Chincoteague in 1940
- Thomas Downing, restaurateur, born in Chincoteague in 1787
- Emmet Gowin, photographer, spent much of his childhood in Chincoteague

== See also ==
- Chincoteague Fire Department
