= Chincoteague pony =

American horse breed

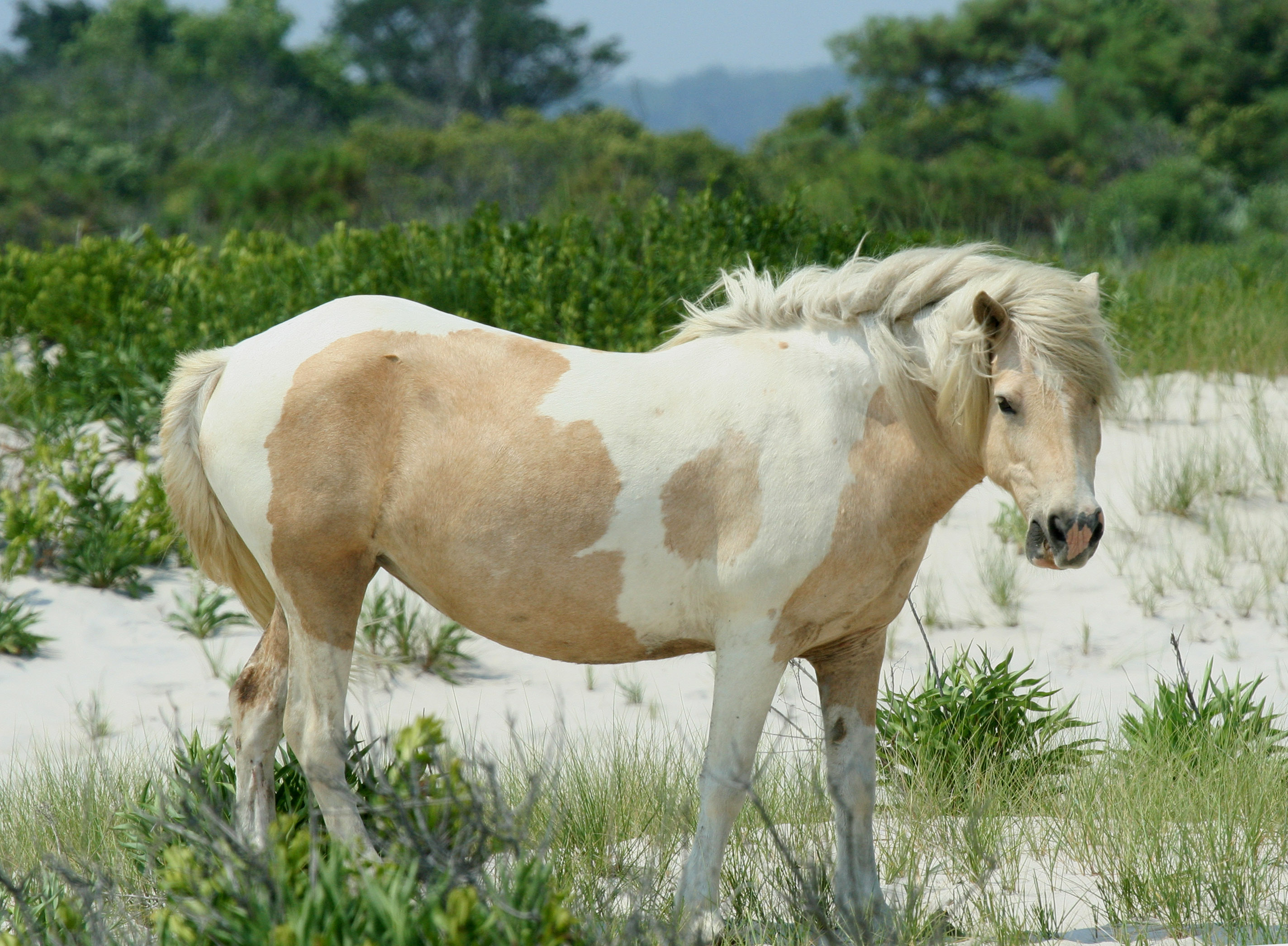
- Chincoteague pony
- Other names: Assateague horse
- Country of origin: United States

Traits
- Distinguishing features: height: 13.2 hands (54 inches, 137 cm); all colors

Breed standards
- International Chincoteague Pony Association & Registry

The Chincoteague pony, also known as the Assateague horse, is an American feral herd on Assateague Island of Virginia and Maryland. The breed was made famous by the Misty of Chincoteague novels, written by Marguerite Henry, and first published in 1947. Although popularly known as Chincoteague ponies, the feral ponies live on Assateague Island which is owned by the US government and is split by a fence at the Maryland–Virginia state line. A herd of around 150 ponies are maintained on the Virginia side of the fence, and 80 on the Maryland side.

The two herds are managed by separate agencies. The Maryland herd (referred to in the literature of the National Park Service as Assateague horses) live within Assateague Island National Seashore. They are generally treated as wild animals, given no more or less assistance than any other species on the island, other than contraceptive treatments to curb overpopulation. Conversely, the Virginia herd (referred to as Chincoteague ponies) live within the Chincoteague National Wildlife Refuge and are owned by the Chincoteague Volunteer Fire Company. The Virginia ponies are treated to twice-yearly veterinary inspections, which prepare them for life among the domestic equine population if they are sold at auction. While only around 300 feral ponies live on Assateague Island, around 1,000 more live off-island, having been purchased or bred by private owners.

In 2023, the Code of Virginia § 1-510 was amended to name the Chincoteague Pony breed as the designated pony of Virginia by the General Assembly of the Commonwealth of Virginia.

== Breed characteristics ==
Chincoteagues average around 13.2 hands (54 inches, 137 cm) in their feral state, but grow to at least 14.2 hands (58 inches, 147 cm) when domesticated and provided better nutrition. They generally weigh around 850 pounds (390 kg). All solid colors are found in the breed, as are pinto patterns. Horses with pinto coloration tend to sell for the most money at the annual auction.

Island Chincoteagues live on a diet of salt marsh plants and brush. This poor-quality (and often seasonally-scarce) food source—combined with uncontrolled inbreeding—created a propensity for conformation faults in the Chincoteague; new bloodlines began to be introduced in the late 19th and early 20th centuries. Due to outside bloodlines being added to the Chincoteague herd, there is some variation in physical characteristics. In general, the breed tends to have a straight or slightly concave facial profile with a broad forehead and refined throatlatch and neck. The shoulders are well angled, the ribs well sprung, the chest broad and the back short with broad loins. The croup is rounded, with a thick, low-set tail. The breed's legs tend to be straight, with good, dense bone that makes them sound and sturdy.

Domesticated Chincoteagues are considered intelligent and willing to please. They are viewed as easy to train, and are used as hunter, driving, and trail ponies. In terms of health, they are generally hardy and easy keepers (able to live on little food). In the late 19th century, one author praised their "good manners and gentle disposition" while reporting the story of one pony who was ridden a distance of around 1,000 miles (1,600 km) in 34 days by a man with equipment, a load that weighed around 160 pounds (73 kg)—the pony weighed approximately 500 pounds (230 kg).

== History ==
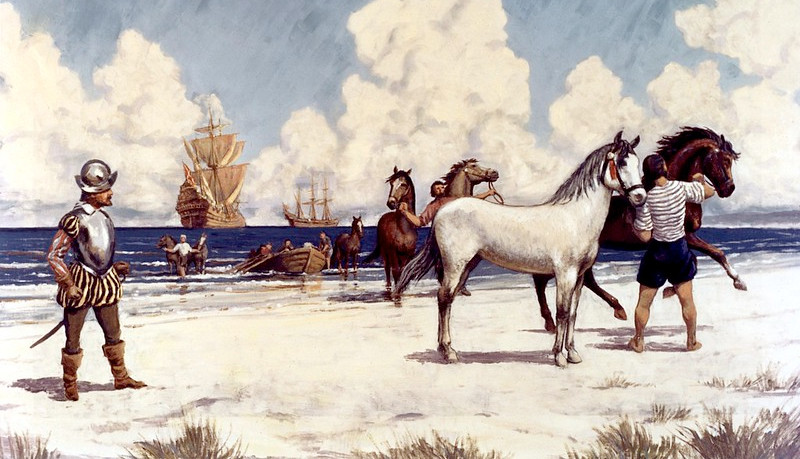
Spanish horses, portrayed here as the Andalusian horse breed, as depicted by artist Carl Rakeman in his painting 1539 Coming of the Horse.

Legend states that Chincoteague ponies descend from Spanish horses shipwrecked off the Virginia coast on their way to Peru in the 16th century. Another story holds that they descend from horses left on the island by pirates. Other evidence points to their ancestors actually being horses brought to the islands in the 17th century by mainland farmers. Livestock on the islands were not subject to taxes or fencing laws, and so many animals, including hogs, sheep, cattle and horses, were brought to the islands.

While the National Park Service holds to the theory that the horses were brought to the island in the 17th century, the Chincoteague Volunteer Fire Company, which owns the ponies on the Virginia side of Assateague, argues that the Spanish shipwreck theory is correct. They argue that horses were too valuable in the 17th century to have been left to run wild on the island, and claim that there are two sunken Spanish galleons off the Virginia coast in support of their theory. The National Chincoteague Pony Association also promotes the shipwreck theory. In 2022, a DNA study of a 500-year-old Spanish horse tooth from Puerto Real, Vieques, Puerto Rico indicated that its closest genetic relative was the Chincoteague pony, supporting the theory that the ponies are descended from colonial Spanish bloodstock.

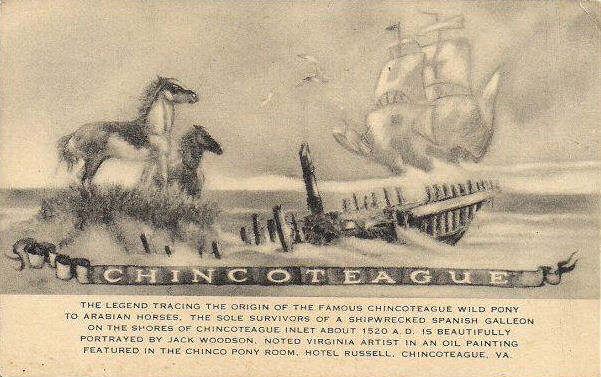
A turn-of-the-century postcard advertising Chincoteague Island, based on an oil painting by Virginian artist Jack Woodson (c. 1920s), which depicts Chincoteague ponies as the descendants of "Arabian horses...[who were] the sole survivors of a shipwrecked Spanish galleon".

In the early 1900s, they were described as having been on the islands since well before the American Revolution, and were described at that time as "very diminutive, but many of them are of perfect symmetry and extraordinary powers of action and endurance". In the early 1800s, Virginia governor Henry A. Wise released what one author called the "earliest printed testimony" on the Chincoteague. In 1835, the practice of pony penning began, with residents rounding up a number of ponies and relocating them to the mainland. In 1924, the first official "Pony Penning Day" was held by the Chincoteague Volunteer Fire Company, where ponies were auctioned as a way to raise money for fire equipment. Some younger ponies are kept for domesticating, such as training, riding and general taming work, with many ponies eventually becoming cherished and obedient animals. The annual event has continued in the same fashion almost uninterrupted to the present day.

During the 1920s, before the herds were managed by various agencies, many conformation faults were found—the effects of uncontrolled inbreeding. Misshapen legs, narrow chests, poor bone and a lack of substance plagued the breed, with many stunted animals not growing above 12 hands (48 inches, 122 cm). This was partially due to the limited and poor-quality feed found on the islands, although this harsh habitat also allowed only the hardiest and most adaptable ponies to survive. Welsh pony and Shetland pony blood was added to upgrade the stock; horses with pinto coloring were introduced to give the herd its common distinctive patterns, and contribute to the more horse-like phenotype of the breed. Twenty Mustangs owned by the Bureau of Land Management were introduced in 1939. Arabian blood was added in the hopes of adding refinement and height to the breed, as well as increasing the length of their legs.

The Chincoteague pony has a similar history to the Shackleford Banker Horse, which comes from the Shackleford Banks off the coast of North Carolina. However, the Shackleford is a more isolated population, with no outside blood added to the herd.

The island itself has also undergone change. At one time, the island was connected to the southernmost point of Fenwick Island. In August 1933, the 1933 Chesapeake–Potomac hurricane created an inlet south of Ocean City, Maryland, separating the two landforms. After the storm, a permanent system of artificial jetties was built to preserve the inlet as a navigation channel. As a result of the jetties disrupting sand movement in the area, the island has drifted westward, and the two landmasses are now over 1 kilometer (0.62 mi) apart.

== Pony penning and auction ==
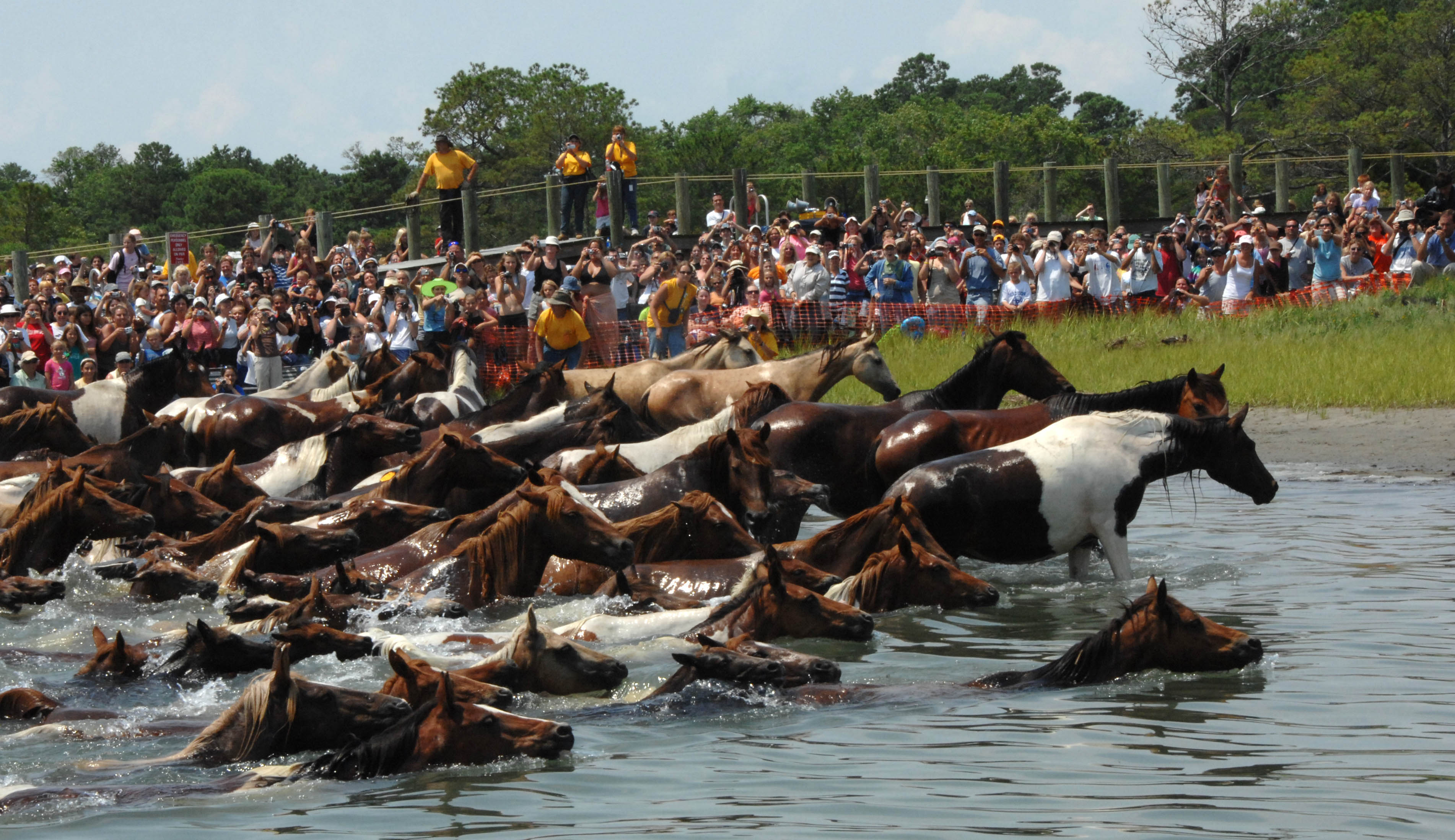
Pony Penning, 2007

In 1835, the first written description of "pony penning" (roundup) appeared, though the practice of rounding up livestock on the island existed for many years before that. Initially, unclaimed animals were marked for ownership by groups of settlers. By 1885, the event had become a festival day, and two days of horse and sheep roundups were held on Assateague and Chincoteague Islands. While the sheep population diminished over time, the pony population grew.

In 1909, the last Wednesday and Thursday of July were designated as the annual days for pony penning, still taking place on both Assateague and Chincoteague Islands. However, in the early 1920s, much of Assateague Island was purchased by a wealthy farmer, forcing many settlers to move to Chincoteague Island and necessitating a change in the pony penning format.

By 1923, all parts of pony penning except for the actual roundup had moved to Chincoteague Island, with the ponies being transported by truck for the first two years before the annual swim was begun. By the early 1900s, Chincoteague Island had been established as a tourism and sport haven, and in 1922, a causeway was completed that connected the island to the Virginia mainland. After a pair of fires ravaged Chincoteague Island that same year, the Chincoteague Volunteer Fire Company was established. In 1924, the first official Pony Penning Day was held, where the foals were auctioned at $25–50 each to raise money for fire equipment. Pony Penning Day has been held annually ever since, with the exception of 1942, 1943, and 2020.

As many as 50,000 visitors gather on the last Wednesday in July to watch mounted riders bring the Virginia herd from Assateague and swim them across the channel to Chincoteague Island. The swim takes five to ten minutes, with both the rider and the observers on hand to assist horses, especially foals, who may have a hard time with the crossing. Before the swim, the herd is evaluated and mares in the late stages of pregnancy and those with very young foals are removed from the herd to be trailered between the islands. During the swim, some lactating mares become affected with hypocalcemia, which is treated by on-site veterinarians. Larger foals are auctioned the next day and the majority of the herd, including any young foals, are returned to Assateague on Friday.

As of 2015, the highest price paid for a pony was $25,000, and the lowest price was $500. Some ponies are purchased under "buy back" conditions, where the bidder donates the money to the fire department but allows the pony to be released back onto Assateague Island.

From 2020 to 2021, the Chincoteague annual pony auction was held online due to the COVID-19 pandemic, and the pony swim was cancelled for the first time since World War II. The 2020 online auction raised $388,000 from the sale of 68 ponies; and in the 2021 online auction, 75 ponies, including 10 buybacks, were auctioned for $416,950. The auction returned to being in-person in 2022, and raised a record $450,200 from the sale of 63 ponies, including 10 buybacks. Prices averaged out to about ~$7,000 per pony, with prices rising to $32,000 for the highest price paid for a pony, and $2,500 the lowest price paid.

== Herd management ==
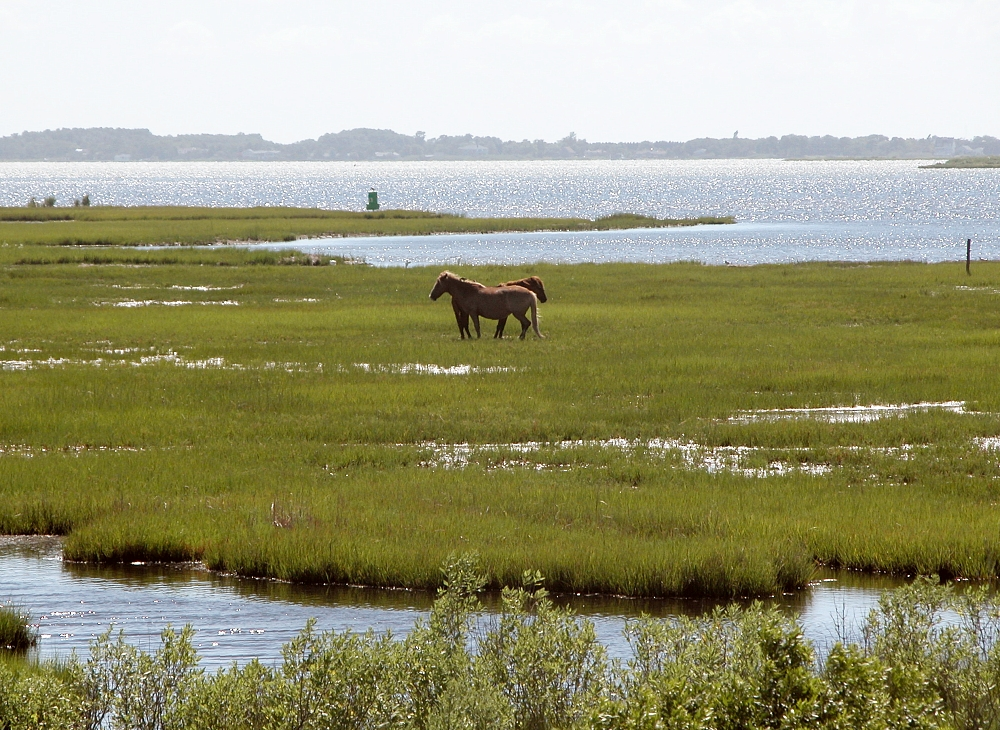
A pair of ponies in the marshes of Assateague

All of Chincoteague Island lies within Virginia state lines, while Assateague Island is split between two states—a larger northern portion in Maryland and the smaller southern section within Virginia. Two separate herds of ponies live on Assateague Island, separated by a fence that runs along the Maryland-Virginia state border. Though descended from the same original stock, the Maryland feral ponies are called "Assateague horses" and are maintained by the National Park Service.

The Virginia feral ponies are called "Chincoteague ponies", and are owned by Chincoteague Volunteer Fire Department. In 1943, the entire island was purchased by the federal government and divided into two protected areas, Assateague Island National Seashore in Maryland and Chincoteague National Wildlife Refuge in Virginia. The Maryland section of Assateague also contains Assateague State Park, where the ponies are allowed to roam, and the state plays little part in their management, besides immunocontraception.

The feral ponies in both herds separate themselves into small bands, with most consisting of a stallion, several mares and their foals. Ponies on Assateague have a diet that consists mainly of cordgrass, a coarse grass that grows in salt marshes, which makes up around 80 percent of their food. This diet is supplemented by other vegetation such as rose hips, bayberry, greenbriar, American beach grass, seaweed and poison ivy. Chincoteague ponies require up to twice as much water as most horses require due to the saltiness of their diet. The increased amount of water that they drink contributes to many ponies appearing to be bloated or fat.

=== Maryland herd ===
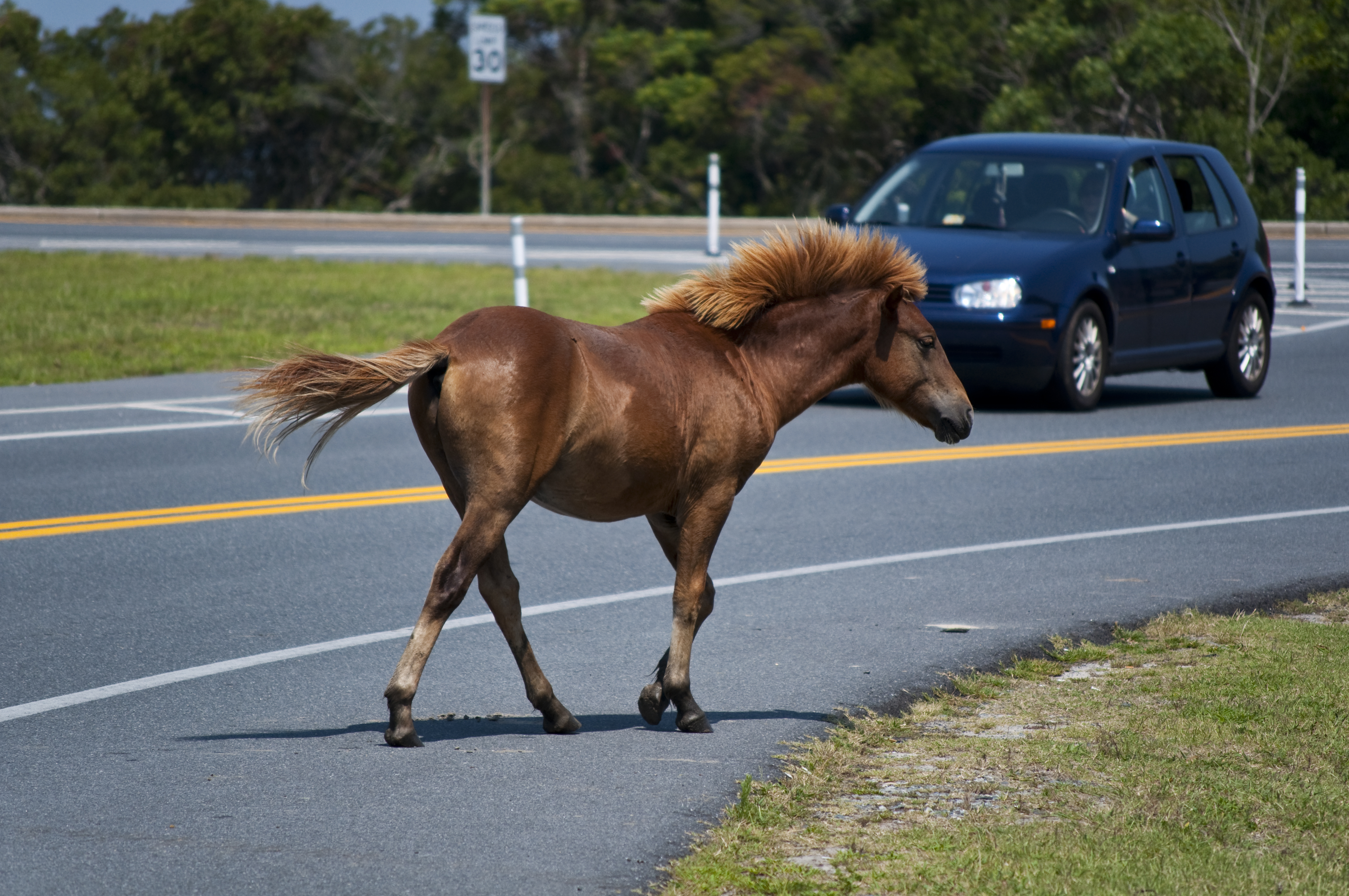
Ponies often come into close contact with humans, even in their native environment.

The Maryland herd, often called the Assateague herd, is owned and managed by the National Park Service. Its presence on a relatively small and naturally confined area has made it ideal for scientific study. Since the late 1970s, scientists have used the herd to conduct studies on feral horse behavior, social structure, ecology, remote contraceptive delivery and pregnancy testing, and the effects of human intervention on other wild animal populations. There are few other wildlife populations of any species worldwide that have been studied in as much detail over as long a period as the Maryland herd of Chincoteague ponies.

Herd numbers grew from 28 to over 165 between 1968 and 1997 and overgrazing negatively impacted their living environment. To manage population numbers, long-term, non-hormonal contraceptives have been employed, proving 95 percent effective over a seven-year field trial. The contraceptive, which began to be used at a management level in 1995 although it was used in smaller amounts as early as 1989, has also proven effective at improving the health and increasing the life expectancy of older mares through the removal of pregnancy and lactation-related stress. Since 1990, general herd health has improved, early mortality has decreased and older ponies are now found, with many over the age of 20 and some even over 25. No horse has ever been injured during the dart-administered treatments, although there is a 0.2 percent rate of abscess at the injection site, which normally heals within two weeks. Each mare between two and four years old is given contraceptives, and treatment is then withdrawn until she produces a foal. Once she has produced enough foals to be well represented genetically within the herd, she is placed on a yearly treatment plan until her death. After the introduction of the contraceptive, herd numbers continued to rise to a high of 175 in 2001 to 2005, but then dropped significantly to around 130 in 2009. In 2009, a study determined that mitochondrial DNA diversity in the herd was quite low, most likely due to their isolation, but that their nuclear genetic diversity remained at a level similar to that of breeds from the mainland.

Other than the contraceptive and treatment in emergencies, ponies from the Maryland herd are treated much like other wildlife, with no extra attention paid to them by Park Service employees. It is thought likely that the Maryland herd carries equine infectious anemia (EIA); they are effectively quarantined, however, by allowing no riding or camping with privately owned horses along the mainland shore during the insect season which stretches from mid-May to October. Due to their treatment as wild animals, ponies from the Maryland herd can be aggressive, and there have been reports of them tearing down tents and biting, kicking and knocking down visitors. In 2010, after an increase in biting incidents, the National Park Service implemented new measures for educating visitors about the ponies. These measures included new safety information in brochures and recommended viewing distances between the visitors and the ponies. There is also some danger to the ponies from the visitors: ponies have become ill from being fed inappropriate human foods, and on average one Maryland pony a year is killed by a car. Since 1991 there has been a "Pony Patrol", where volunteers on bikes patrol the island, educating visitors about the ponies.

=== Virginia herd ===
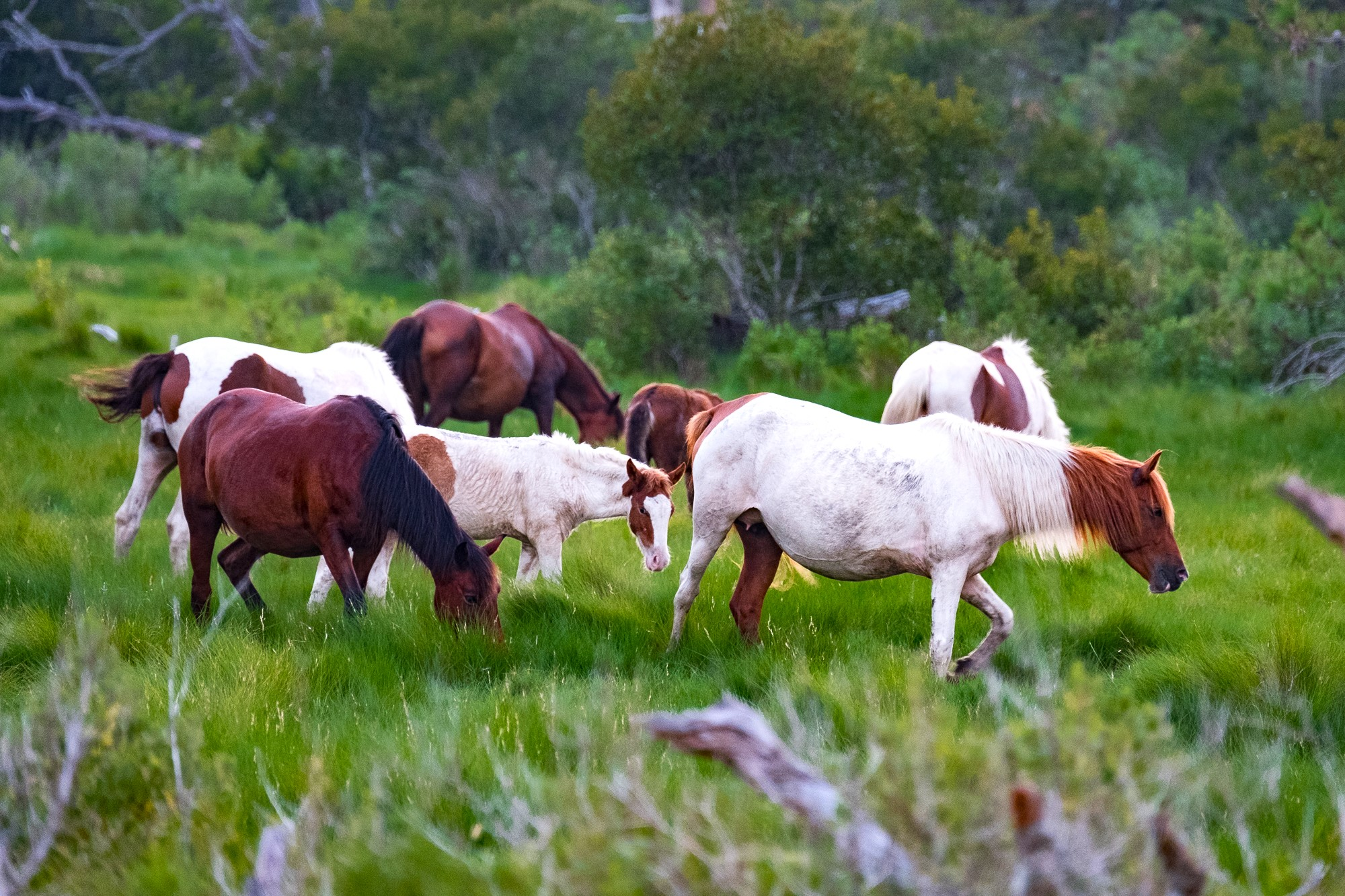
Ponies in the Chincoteague National Wildlife Refuge

The Virginia herd, often called the Chincoteague herd, is owned and managed by the Chincoteague Volunteer Fire Company. The US Fish and Wildlife Service (FWS) allows the ponies to live on Assateague under a special use grazing permit, allowing approximately 150 adult ponies in the Chincoteague National Wildlife Refuge.

60 to approximately 70 foals are born into the Chincoteague herd each year. The annual Pony Pennings are used to maintain the herd size at around 150 animals. Since 1943, the FWS has been working on the island to protect and increase the wildfowl population, and their efforts have sometimes endangered the Chincoteague herd. Due to the placement of fences by the FWS, a reduced amount of land is available for grazing by the ponies. The fencing also prevents them from reaching the sea, where they often went to escape biting insects, including mosquitos. In 1962, several ponies were trapped in an enclosure by high water and died when they were carried out to sea during a storm. Unlike the Maryland herd, ponies on the Virginia side of the island are fenced off from roadways to prevent auto accidents and to discourage visitors from feeding the ponies.

In the late 20th century, some ponies previously sold at auction were returned to Assateague Island when population numbers threatened to drop below the targeted numbers due to large numbers of deaths from storms or other issues. Since 1990, the ponies from the Virginia herd have been rounded up biannually for veterinary treatment, including deworming and vaccinations for diseases such as rabies, tetanus and Eastern and Western encephalitis, although they make the swim to Chincoteague only once per year. In addition, continual monitoring and basic first aid for any minor injuries is performed by a committee from the fire department. Such intervention is needed because many of the ponies will be brought into the general horse population through the auction and purchase by private buyers. During the veterinary visits, they are also tested for EIA.

The Chincoteague pony was added to the Code of Virginia § 1-510 (Official emblems and designations) as the designated pony of Virginia by the General Assembly of the Commonwealth of Virginia in February 2023.

== Breed registry and preservation ==
The National Chincoteague Pony Association (NCPA) was founded in 1985, and the International Chincoteague Pony Association and Registry (ICPAR) was founded in 2021. The associations maintain a studbook and register ponies from the annual fire company auction and ponies from private breeders. The ICPAR registers half-Chincoteague Ponies from private breeders. The Chincoteague Pony Association (CPA) was founded by the Chincoteague Volunteer Fire Company in 1994, and closed in 2012. Many ponies are registered with multiple associations, especially if they are half-Chincoteague pony crosses with other horse breeds. There are more than 1,000 Chincoteague ponies owned by private individuals off Chincoteague Island, spread throughout the United States and Canada.

== Book and museum ==
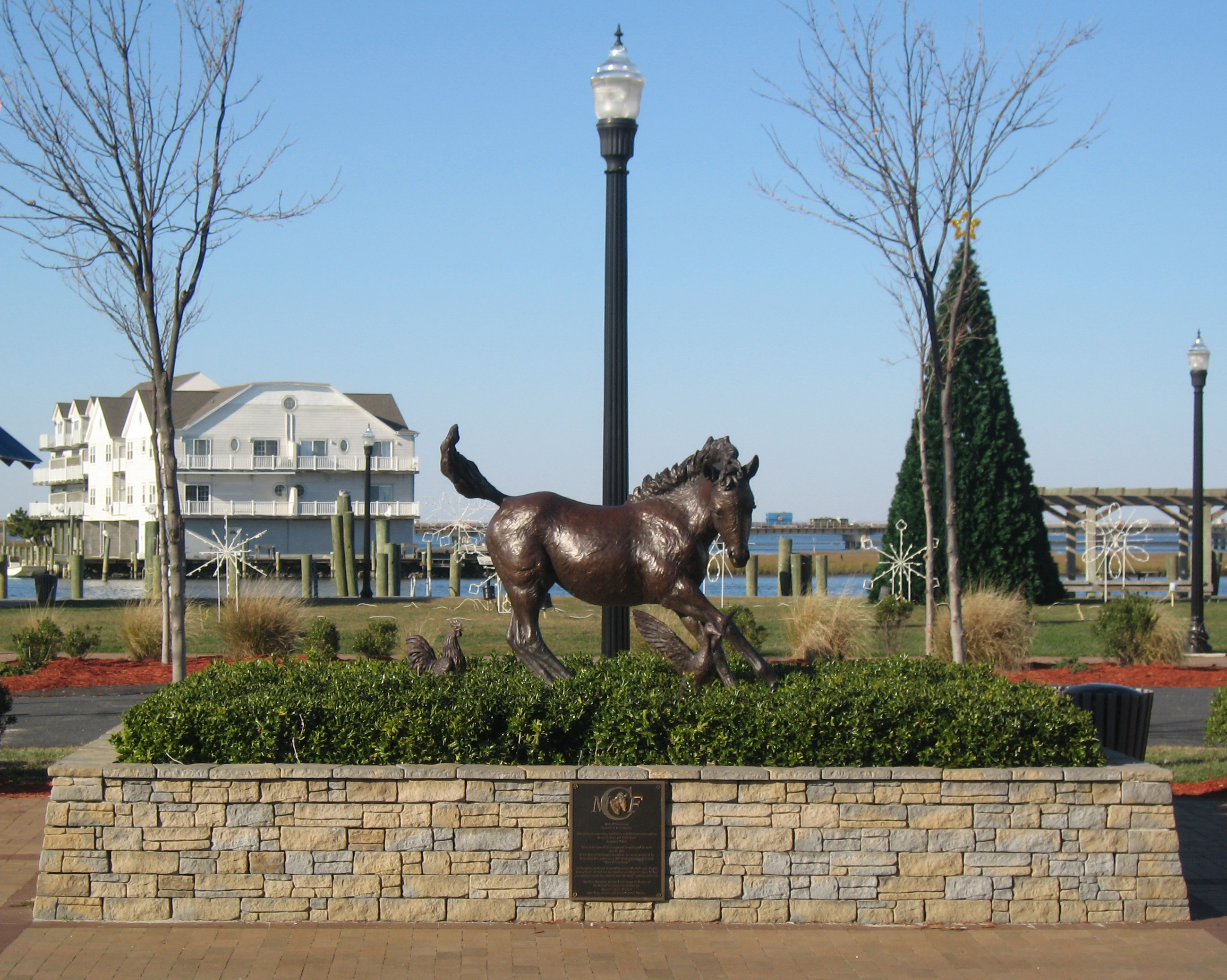
A statue of Misty stands in Chincoteague, Virginia.

In 1947, pony book author Marguerite Henry released the children's book Misty of Chincoteague, the first in a series of novels that made the Chincoteague ponies internationally famous. The real Misty was foaled on Chincoteague Island in 1946, and was purchased as a weanling by Henry. In 1961, the book met further success after it was adapted into a film.

The publicity assisted the Chincoteague Fire Department and the breed in remaining viable into the 21st century. While fictionalized, the books were based on a real horse and ranch on Chincoteague Island. The Misty of Chincoteague Foundation was established in 1990 to preserve the Beebe Ranch, the home of Misty of Chincoteague, and to establish a museum with memorabilia from the series. In 2023, the Museum of Chincoteague Island purchased the Beebe Ranch to preserve it with the intention of opening it as a visitors center.
