= Eastern Shore of Maryland =

Part of the U.S. state of Maryland

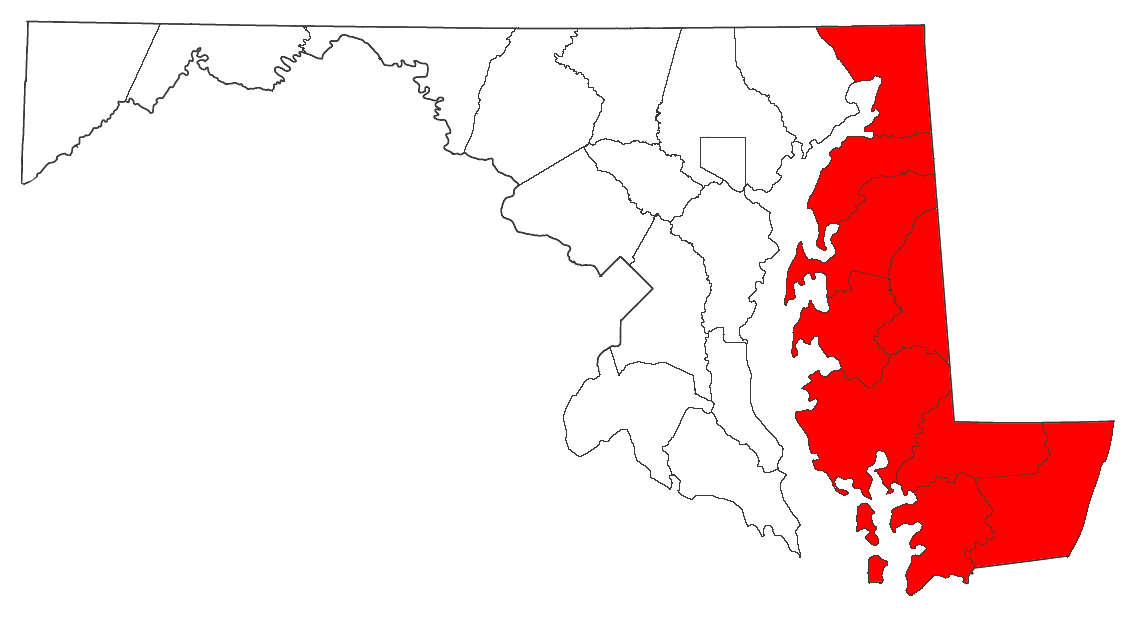
- The counties of the Eastern Shore of Maryland
- Coordinates: 38.7°N 75.8°W
- Country: United States
- State: Maryland
- Largest city: Salisbury
- Counties: List: Caroline; Cecil; Dorchester; Kent; Queen Anne's; Somerset; Talbot; Wicomico; Worcester

Population (2020 Census)
  - Total: 456,815
- Time zone: UTC−5 (EST)
  - Summer (DST): UTC−4 (EDT)

The Eastern Shore of Maryland is a part of the U.S. state of Maryland that lies mostly on the east side of the Chesapeake Bay. Nine counties are normally included in the region. The Eastern Shore is part of the larger Delmarva Peninsula that Maryland shares with Delaware and Virginia.

As of the 2020 census, its population was 456,815, with about 7% of Marylanders living in the region. The region is politically more conservative than the rest of the state, generally returning more votes for Republicans than Democrats in statewide and national elections.

Developed in the colonial and federal period for agriculture, the Eastern Shore has remained a relatively rural region. Salisbury is the most populous community on the Eastern Shore of Maryland. The region's economy is dominated by three industry sectors: fishing along the coasts, especially for shellfish such as the blue crab; farming, especially large-scale chicken farms; and tourism, especially centered on the south Atlantic coast and beach resort of Ocean City. Because of its coastal and low-lying geography, the region is vulnerable to extreme weather events, including hurricanes and larger environmental issues like climate change and rising sea levels.

The region contains a few major roads; the main connection to the other parts of Maryland is the Chesapeake Bay Bridge, which carries U.S. Route 50 and U.S. Route 301. U.S. Route 13 connects the southern part of the Eastern Shore to both Delaware and points north and Virginia and points south.

== Geography ==
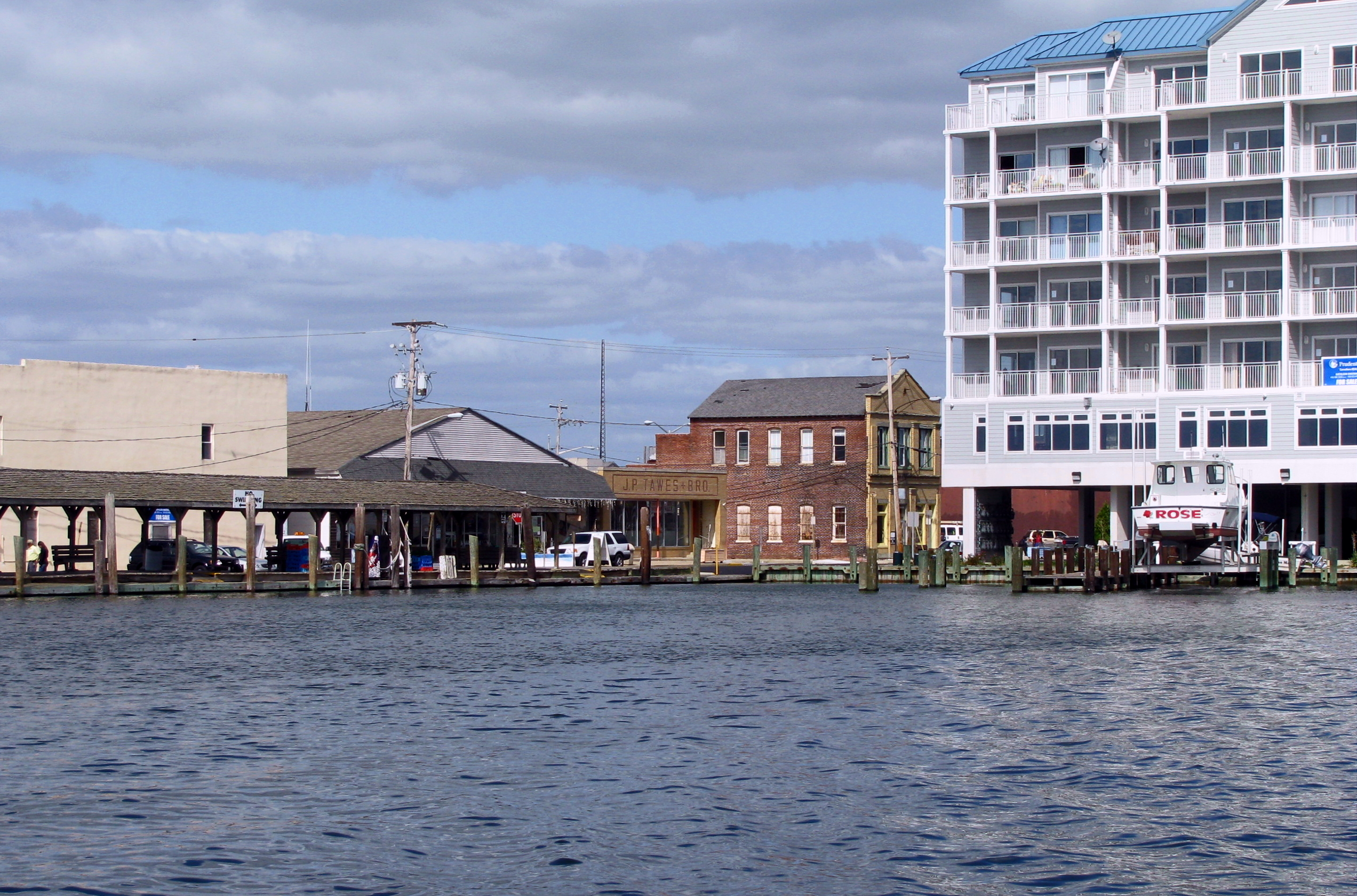
Crisfield, a seafood center along Chesapeake Bay

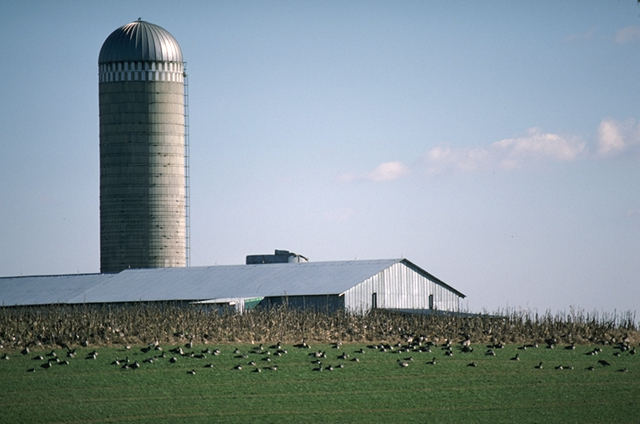
A farm in Kent County

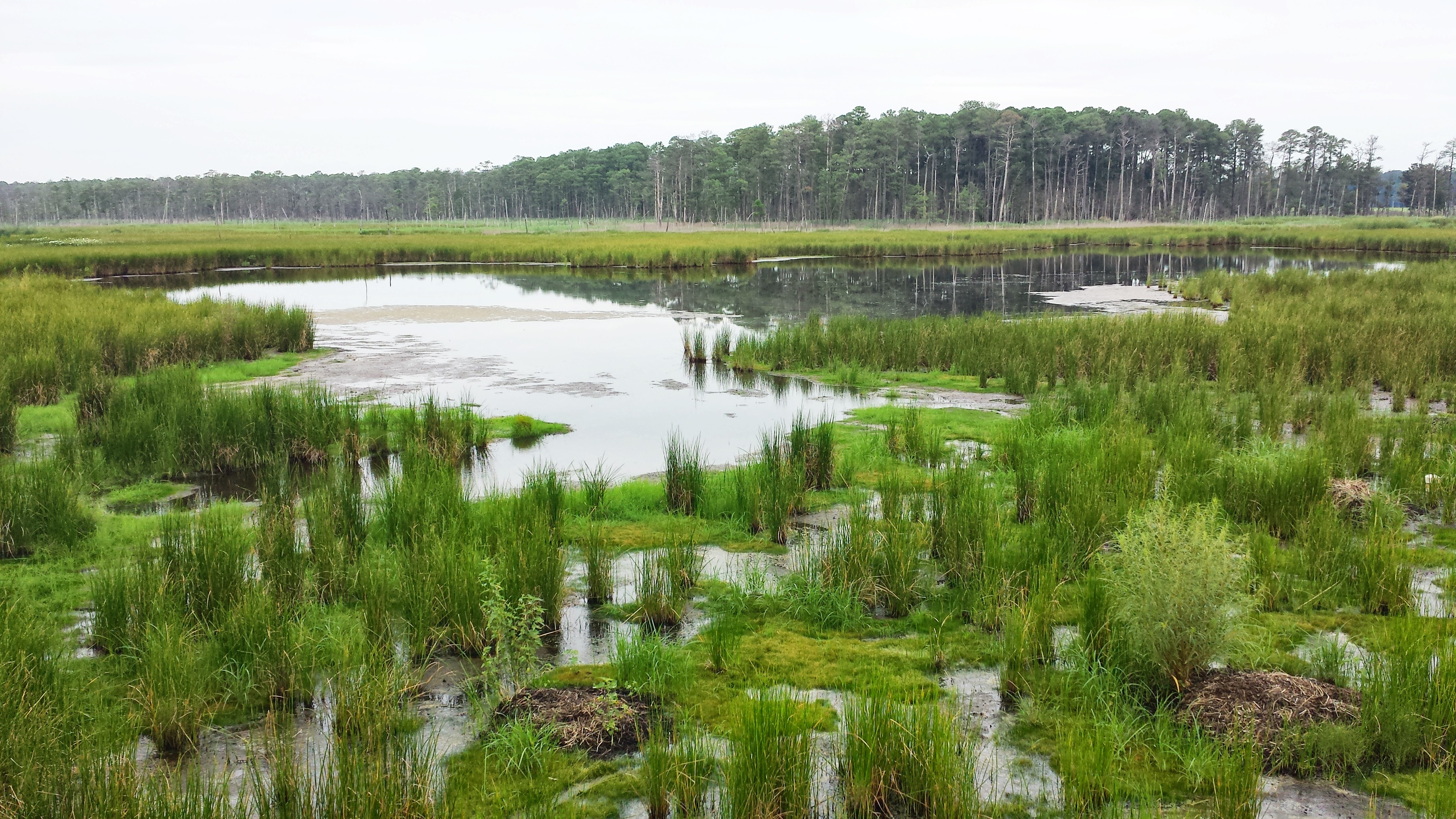
Blackwater National Wildlife Refuge in Dorchester County

The Eastern Shore of Maryland comprises Caroline, Cecil, Dorchester, Kent, Queen Anne's, Somerset, Talbot, Wicomico, and Worcester counties. These lie on the eastern side of the Chesapeake Bay and Susquehanna River, which is the western border of Cecil County with Harford County. The region borders the Mason–Dixon line with Delaware to the east and north, the Atlantic Ocean on the east, and Virginia's Eastern Shore on the south. Maryland's and Virginia's Eastern Shores, along with most of Delaware, form the Delmarva Peninsula.

The location of the southern border with Virginia was a cause for significant dispute amongst colonists prior to 1668, when Phillip Calvert of Maryland and Edmund Scarborough of Virginia demarcated the Calvert-Scarborough Line. This line ran northeast from Watkins Point in the Chesapeake through the James L. Horsey Farm and beyond to the Atlantic, but was ultimately never observed due to poor marking. The line in use today was established under the Award of 1877; this line travels east from Watkins Point, then up the middle of the Pocomoke River before heading due east along the Calvert-Scarborough Line at the point where it intersects the river.

Like New Castle County, Delaware, Cecil County is crossed by the Fall Line, a geologic division where the rockier highlands of the Piedmont region meet the Atlantic coastal plain, a flat, sandy area that forms the coast. The coastal plain includes the Delmarva Peninsula and hence the Eastern Shore of Maryland. The geology of Delmarva is an inseparable part of the Eastern Shore, which has few rocky outcrops south of Kent County.

The Chesapeake and Delaware Canal crosses from Back Creek on the Elk River to Port Penn, Delaware. While it was a shallow canal with locks after its construction in 1829, it was deepened in the early 20th century to sea level, and physically separates the Delmarva Peninsula from the rest of the United States. Maryland south of the canal is considered the Eastern Shore by residents. The term Western Shore is used by Eastern Shore residents to describe all the counties of Maryland west of the Chesapeake Bay, but especially those of the Baltimore-Washington metropolitan area and Southern Maryland.

The north–south section of the Mason–Dixon line forms the border between Maryland and Delaware. The border was originally marked every mile by a stone, and every five miles by a "crownstone". The line is not quite due north and south, but is as straight as survey methods of the 1760s could make it. It was surveyed as a compromise solution to a century-long wrangle over colonial territory between the Penn and Calvert families of England. If the Chesapeake Bay/Delaware Bay watershed divide had been taken as the borderline, the state of Delaware would be about half its current size.

== History ==
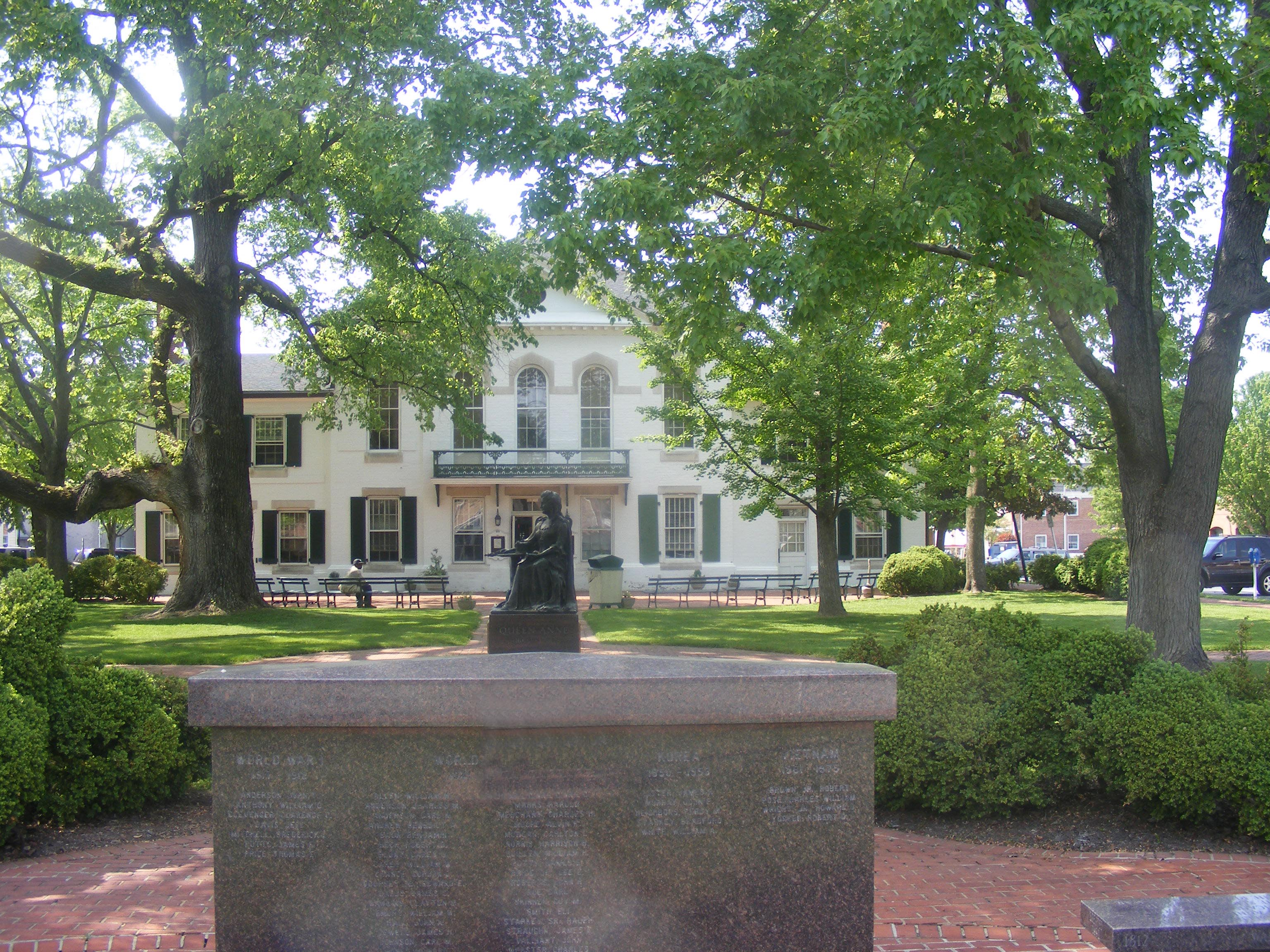
Queen Anne's County courthouse

=== Early history ===
William Claiborne was granted land that was then part of the Colony of Virginia in 1629. He named it "Kent County". In 1631, he sailed north up the Chesapeake Bay from its south and west side to the area known today as Kent Island. There he made a fortified settlement that is considered to be the first English settlement within the Province of Maryland. Talbot County was formed in 1662. Cecil County was formed in 1674, by proclamation of the Governor, from eastern portions of Baltimore County and the northern portion of Kent County. Wicomico County was formed in 1867, as the 9th and last county, created from Somerset and Worcester counties.

==== Formation of counties ====
- 1642 Kent County - In 1642, the governor and council appointed commissioners for the Isle and County of Kent. This act appears to have led to the establishment of Kent County, named after the county of Kent in England.
- 1661 Talbot County - named for Lady Grace Talbot, the wife of Sir Robert Talbot, an Irish statesman, and the sister of Cecilius Calvert, 2nd Baron Baltimore.
- 1666 Somerset County - named for Mary, Lady Somerset, the wife of Sir John Somerset and daughter of Thomas Arundell, 1st Baron Arundell of Wardour.
- 1669 Dorchester County - Named for the Earl of Dorset, a family friend of the Calverts (the founding family of the Maryland colony). Dorchester is the County Town of Dorset in England.
- 1674 Cecil County.
- 1706 Queen Anne's County - formed from northern parts of Talbot and southern portions of Kent. Name after Queen Anne of Great Britain who reigned when the county was established.
- 1742 Worcester County - named for the Earl of Worcester.
- 1773 Caroline County - formed from parts of Dorchester and Queen Anne's counties. The county derives its name from Lady Caroline Eden, wife of Maryland's last colonial governor of the Province of Maryland, Robert Eden.
- 1867 Wicomico County.

=== 19th century ===
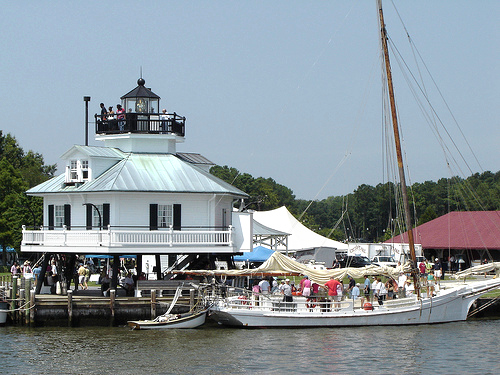
Chesapeake Bay Maritime Museum in St. Michaels

Ocean City was founded on July 4, 1875, when the Atlantic Hotel opened on Assateague Island. At the time, Assateague Island was continuous from the Delaware state line to well south of Ocean City: the Ocean City Inlet was not formed until a hurricane in August 1933 cut across the south end of the town. The inlet was cut not by waves sweeping inland, but by 4 or 5 days' worth of freshwater runoff from the coastal creeks running seaward. By 1935, government money had built jetties to make the inlet permanent, dividing Fenwick Island (north) from Assateague Island (south). Early transportation to the island was by train.

Until the 1820s, travel and commerce between the Eastern Shore and Baltimore were less important than the connections between it and Philadelphia. Water travel by sailboat and steamer linked the Eastern Shore to Baltimore more tightly beginning about 1813, when the first steamboat traveled the Bay. By the 1880s, railroad lines linked the Eastern Shore to Philadelphia and later, Norfolk, Virginia, by way of a railroad line straight south from Wilmington to Dover, Delmar, Salisbury, and Cape Charles. Maryland's Eastern Shore was served by branch lines running generally southwest from the main route. See List of railroad lines in the Delmarva Peninsula. The Eastern Shore's many branchlines were built after the Civil War by local companies; by the late nineteenth century, all were controlled by the Pennsylvania Railroad (which also bought control of the steamboat and ferry routes), then Conrail and Norfolk Southern. Today the remaining active railroad tracks on the Eastern Shore are operated by short-line railroads Delmarva Central Railroad and the Maryland and Delaware Railroad.

Commercial east–west ties between Delaware towns and Maryland towns were culturally significant in Colonial and Early American periods despite the border line, which largely cut through woods and swamps. Trade with Philadelphia was conducted by overland routes to Delaware towns such as Odessa (then called Cantwell's Bridge) and Smyrna, then called Duck Creek. Agricultural products and milled grain were taken up the Delaware River by "shallop men" in small vessels called shallops. These cultural connections continue to this day.

=== 20th and 21st centuries ===
An east–west rail route ran from a ferry terminal at Claiborne, west of St. Michaels, to Ocean City, via the Baltimore and Eastern Shore Railroad and the Wicomico and Pocomoke Railroad. Travelers could also take a ferry to Love Point on Kent Island, board a Queen Anne's Railroad train, and travel east to Lewes and Rehoboth Beach, Delaware.

Automobile transportation across the Chesapeake Bay was by ferryboat until 1952, when the first Chesapeake Bay Bridge was opened for traffic.

In the late 1950s and early 1960s, developers began selling lots on Assateague Island, south of the inlet. However, a storm on March 6, 1962 destroyed houses, shacks, and roads. The state and federal governments intervened before reconstruction by creating the Assateague Island National Seashore and Assateague State Park to preserve this area rather than have it be developed.

An Eastern Shore Baseball League operated during three periods between 1922 and 1949. It was a Class D minor league with teams in all three states of Delmarva.

== Demographics ==
Although the Eastern Shore comprises a large part of Maryland's land area, it had a population of 456,815 as of the 2020 Census, representing about 7.4% of Maryland's total population. The most populous city in the region is Salisbury, and the most populous county is Cecil.

== Elections ==
The Eastern Shore is considerably more conservative than the more densely populated and urban Western Shore. Since the late 20th century, when conservative whites shifted to the Republican Party, the region has strongly supported Republican candidates for governor. The three Republican nominees for governor from 1994 to 2018 –Ellen Sauerbrey, Bob Ehrlich, and Larry Hogan– swept all nine counties. This streak ended in 2022 when Democrat Wes Moore won Kent and Talbot counties, though Republican Dan Cox still won the Eastern Shore overall.

At the presidential level, the Eastern Shore also leans Republican. But Kent and Somerset counties have flipped back and forth in supporting Democratic and Republican presidential candidates. The last Democrat to win Dorchester County was Bill Clinton from Arkansas in 1996. Cecil County has not gone Democratic since Jimmy Carter from Georgia won the county in 1976. Queen Anne's, Caroline, Wicomico, and Worcester counties have voted Republican at every election subsequent to Lyndon Johnson's landslide. Up until 2020, this was true for Talbot County as well, but it was won by Joe Biden.

The Eastern Shore has long been a part of Maryland's 1st Congressional district. Democrat Roy Dyson represented the 1st district from 1981 until 1990, when he was defeated by Republican Wayne Gilchrest. Gilchrest held the seat until 2008, when State Senator Andy Harris defeated him in the Republican primary. Harris narrowly lost the subsequent general election to Democrat Frank Kratovil, Queen Anne's County state's attorney. In 2010, Harris again ran for the district and handily defeated Kratovil after a single term in office. Harris has held the seat without serious difficulty since.

In the Maryland General Assembly, the Eastern Shore encompasses a portion of district 35B and all of districts 35A, 36, 37A and 37B, 38A, 38B and 38C. All seats are held by Republicans except for a state delegate seat in district 37A.

Gubernatorial election results

Gubernatorial election results
Year	Republican	Democratic	Other	Total
2022	55.33% 91,425	41.24% 68,137	3.43% 5,661	165,223
2018	75.80% 131,649	23.02% 39,986	1.16% 1,279	173,657
2014	71.45% 100,608	26.93% 37,919	1.62% 2,277	140,804
2010	59.35% 92,231	38.19% 59,343	2.46% 3,827	155,401
2006	62.05% 90,319	36.92% 53,748	1.03% 1,502	145,569
2002	68.07% 90,000	31.19% 41,241	0.73% 970	132,211
1998	59.02% 66,434	40.94% 46,079	0.04% 50	112,563
1994	62.60% 65,585	37.40% 39,187	0.00% 3	104,775
1990	59.43% 52,288	40.57% 35,692	0.00% 0	87,980

Presidential election results

Presidential election results
Year	Democratic	Republican	Others
2020	41.0% 94,716	56.6% 130,622	2.4% 5,588
2016	36.3% 77,104	58.4% 123,991	5.3% 11,329
2012	42.0% 86,879	56.0% 115,669	2.0% 4,062
2008	42.9% 87,700	55.5% 113,518	1.6% 3,285
2004	38.8% 71,435	60.1% 110,661	1.1% 1,942
2000	43.0% 64,336	53.7% 80,329	3.2% 4,787
1996	42.8% 54,537	46.7% 59,522	10.6% 13,510
1992	36.5% 50,121	44.1% 60,518	19.4% 26,713
1988	36.3% 41,797	63.3% 72,886	0.5% 551
1984	32.5% 34,934	67.1% 72,235	0.4% 454
1980	42.9% 43,447	51.3% 52,000	5.8% 5,919
1976	48.6% 43,838	51.4% 46,301	–
1972	27.5% 23,215	71.2% 60,020	1.3% 1,088
1968	30.0% 25,506	46.6% 39,578	23.3% 19,808
1964	57.0% 45,899	43.0% 34,585	–
1960	47.1% 38,722	52.9% 43,534	–

== Economy ==
=== Tourism ===
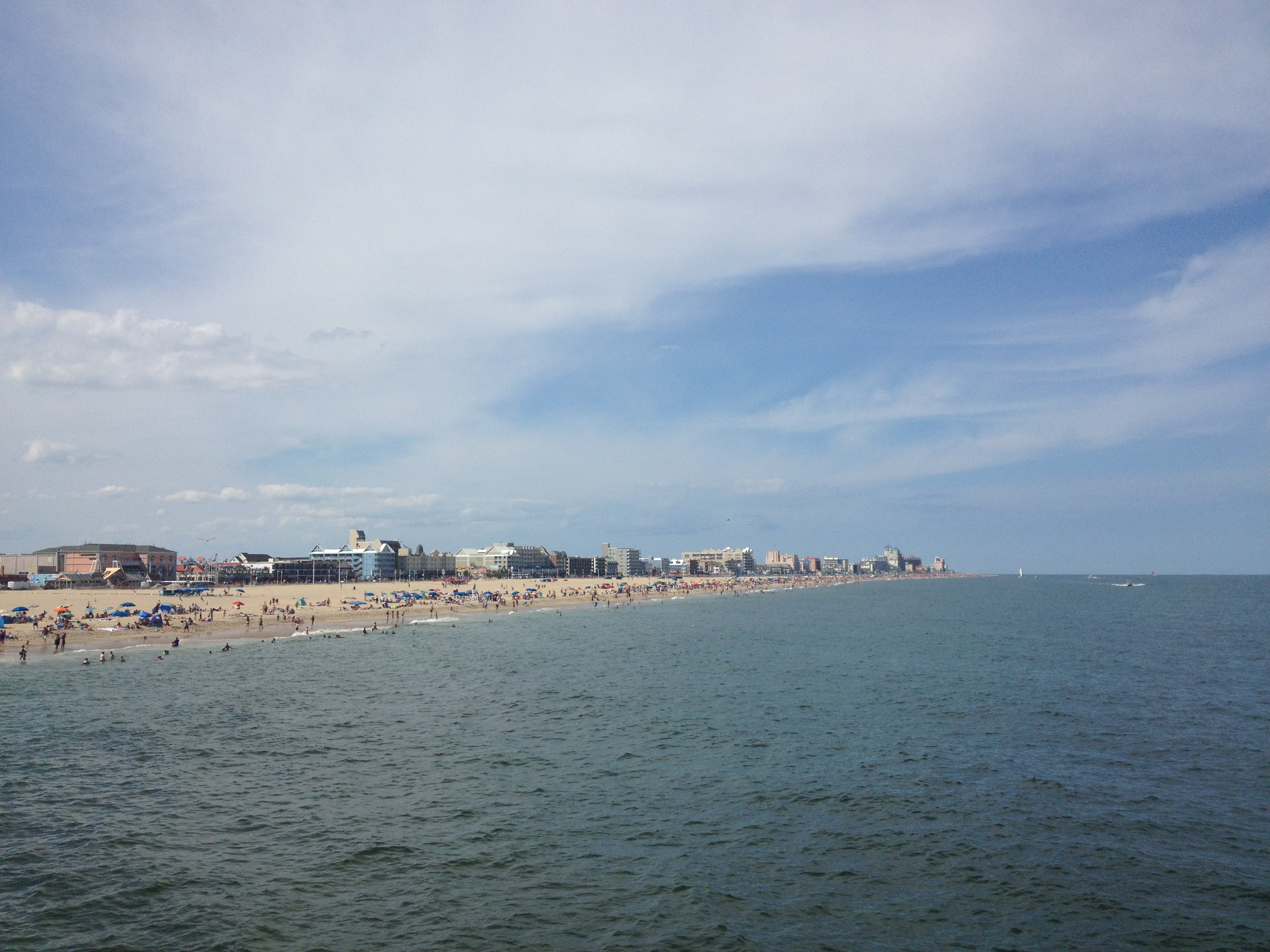
Ocean City, Maryland's beach, looking north from the pier

Ocean City's skyline, containing tall hotels and condominiums, stands out within Delmarva. At the southern end of the town, a recreational boardwalk spans over thirty blocks, containing carnival rides and games, restaurants, bars, arcades, and clothing boutiques.

Tourists visit St. Michaels on a neck surrounded by water; the colonial former port of Oxford; Chestertown; and isolated Smith Island in the Chesapeake Bay. North of Crisfield is Janes Island State Park, with camping and kayaking trails through marshlands. Cambridge continues to be a popular destination for tourism because of the Blackwater National Wildlife Refuge, the Hyatt Chesapeake Bay Resort, Spa & Marina, and the Harriet Tubman National Park.

=== Fishing ===
At the southern end of the Chesapeake coast of Maryland, the town of Crisfield is home to a fishing, crabbing, and seafood processing industry.

=== Agriculture ===
In the 21st century, the main economic activities on the Eastern Shore are vegetable and grain farming, seafood, large-scale chicken breeding (Perdue Farms was founded in Salisbury and is still headquartered there today), and tourism. Tobacco was the chief commodity crop during colonial times. The agricultural economy switched to mixed products, including grain, in the second half of the 18th century.

=== Energy ===
Energy in the Eastern shore is provided by five oil and natural gas plants.

== Environment ==
As part of the broader Chesapeake Bay watershed, the Eastern Shore confronts common environmental issues of the watershed, such as nutrient runoff from agriculture, but it is also vulnerable to climate change.

Because of its low-lying geography and sandy soil, the region is particularly vulnerable to sea level rise and salt water intrusion. Moreover, because of the coastal geography, infrastructure is already being damaged both due to sea level rise, and storm surge from tropical storms and hurricanes.

The Eastern Shore's economy depends on the larger fisheries and farming, both of which are sensitive to climate change.

== Transportation ==
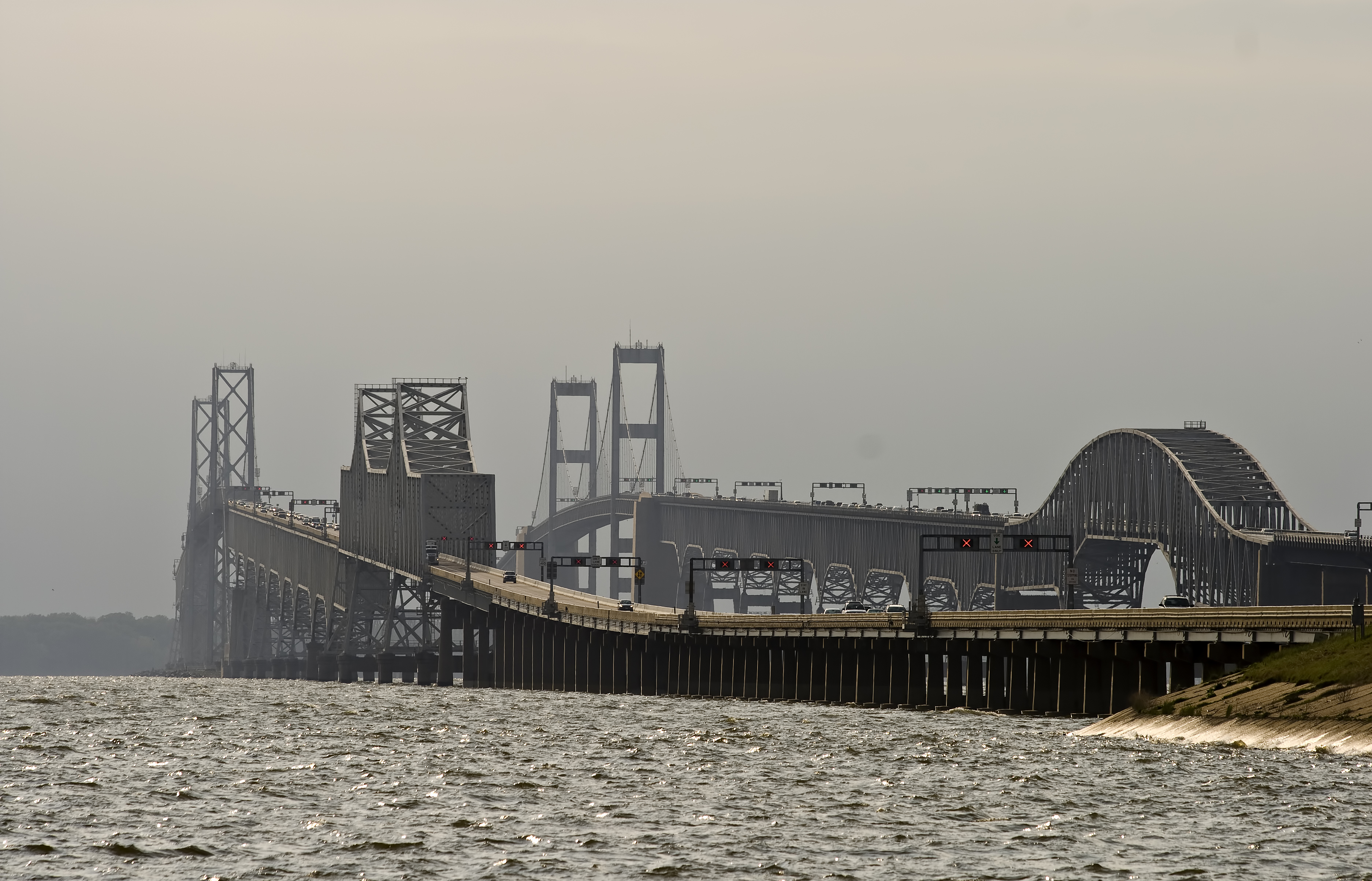
Chesapeake Bay Bridge, which connects the Eastern Shore with the Washington, D.C. and Baltimore metropolitan area and the rest of Maryland

Various waterways provide a medium for commerce and boaters: the Atlantic Ocean, Chesapeake Bay, the Susquehanna River, and the Chesapeake and Delaware Canal.

There are three major routes to the Eastern Shore:

- The Chesapeake Bay Bridge spans 4.35 miles (7.00 km) of the Chesapeake Bay, and at the time of construction in 1952, was the longest continuous over-water steel structure. A second parallel span was added in 1973 and a third has been discussed, most recently in 2006. A third span would not open, according to state officials, until about 2025. The bridges have eased commuting to larger cities. Kent Island, site of the first English settlement on the Shore, has become a bedroom community for Washington, DC; Annapolis, and Baltimore. Kent Island is part of Queen Anne's County.
- U.S. Route 13
- Maryland Route 213

The two major highways on the Eastern Shore are U.S. Route 13 and U.S. Route 50, which meet in Salisbury.

=== Airports ===
Salisbury-Ocean City Wicomico Regional Airport, in Salisbury, is the only commercial airport on the Delmarva Peninsula.

Airports for private aircraft include:

- Bay Bridge Airport in Stevensville
- Cambridge-Dorchester Airport in Cambridge
- Crisfield Municipal Airport in Crisfield.
- Easton Airport, in Easton
- Ocean City Municipal Airport in Ocean City

== Secession ==
The secessionist flag created by State Senator Richard Colburn Jr. in 1998.

The Eastern Shore has made several attempts to separate from Maryland. Proposals were debated in Maryland's General Assembly in 1833–1835, 1852, and 1998. There were earlier proposals visualizing a state encompassing the Delmarva Peninsula. The 1998 proposal by state Senators Richard F. Colburn and J. Lowell Stoltzfus did not specify a status for Eastern Shore's nine counties following secession, but suggested the new state's name could be "Delmarva".

== Sports ==
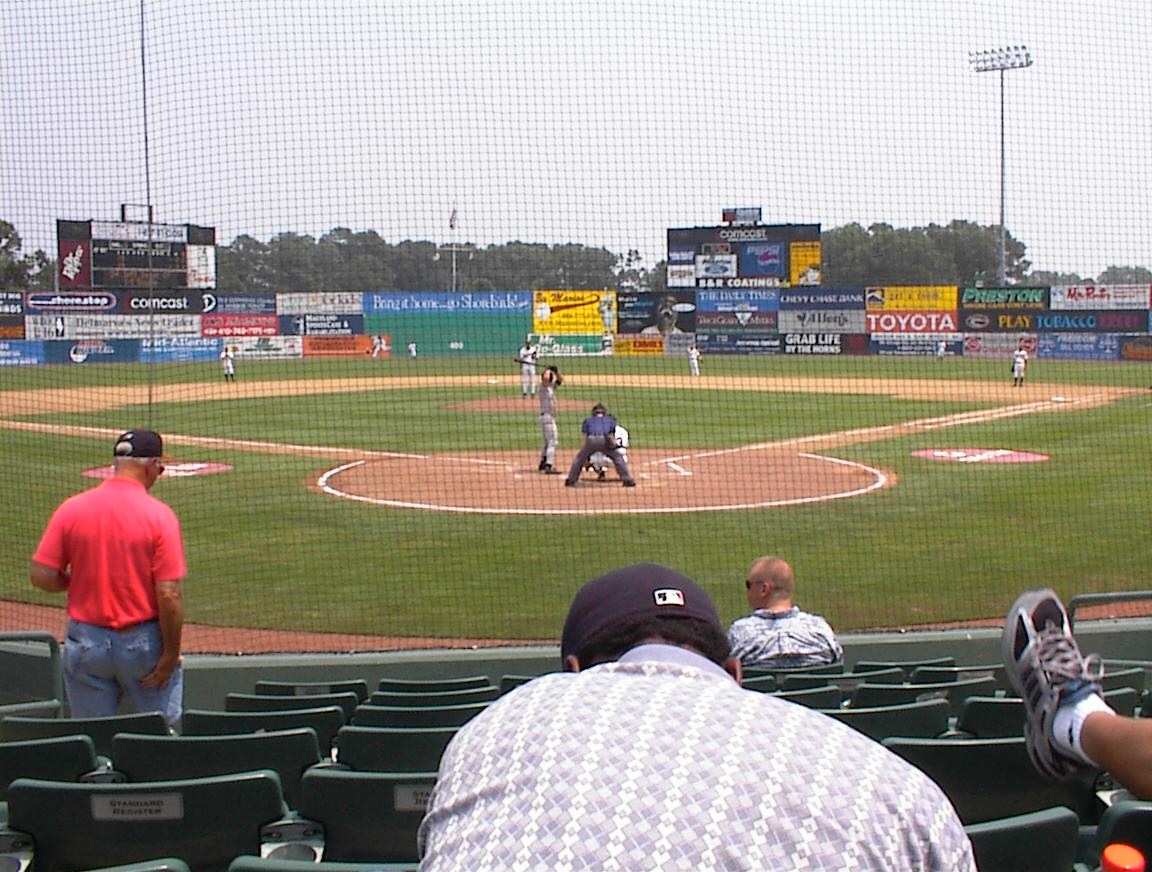
Arthur W. Perdue Stadium, home of the Delmarva Shorebirds Minor League baseball team

The Delmarva Shorebirds are a minor league baseball team who play Class A baseball in the Carolina League at Arthur W. Perdue Stadium in Salisbury, affiliated with the Baltimore Orioles.

== Notable people ==
- John Andrews, clergyman. Born in Cecil County.
- Harold Baines, baseball player. Born in Talbot County.
- Frank "Home Run" Baker, baseball player.
- John Barth, fiction writer. Born in Cambridge, Dorchester County.
- Fannie Birckhead, community organizer and first black woman to serve as mayor on the Eastern Shore. Born in Worcester County.
- Janeen L. Birckhead, military officer and adjutant general of Maryland. Born in Worcester County.
- Erin Burnett, news anchor. Born in Mardela Springs, Wicomico County.
- Gilbert Byron, "Poet of the Chesapeake".
- William Claiborne, first English settler within Maryland. Settled in Kent County.
- Frederick Douglass, abolitionist. Born in Talbot County.
- Jimmie Foxx, baseball player. Born in Sudlersville, Queen Anne's County.
- Robert Goldsborough, delegate to the Continental Congress.
- Linda Hamilton, actress. Born in Salisbury, Wicomico County.
- Edward Lloyd, delegate to the Continental Congress. Born in Talbot County.
- Dale Midkiff, actor. Born in Chance, Somerset County.
- John Needles, Quaker abolitionist and a master craftsman of fine furniture.
- Bill Nicholson, baseball player.
- Frank Perdue, entrepreneur. Born in Salisbury, Wicomico County. Former CEO of Perdue Farms.
- Earl S. Richardson, 11th President of Morgan State University. Born in Westover, Somerset County.
- Maggie Rogers, singer. From Easton, Talbot County.
- Paul Sarbanes, former US Senator. Born in Salisbury, Wicomico County.
- J. Millard Tawes, 54th Governor of Maryland. Born in Crisfield, Somerset County.
- Matthew Tilghman, delegate to the Continental Congress.
- Tench Tilghman, aide-de-camp to George Washington.
- Harriet Tubman, abolitionist, political activist, and Underground Railroad conductor.
- Lambert Wickes, Revolutionary War naval hero.

== Towns and cities ==
County seats:

- Denton – Caroline County
- Elkton – Cecil County
- Cambridge – Dorchester County
- Chestertown – Kent County
- Centreville – Queen Anne's County
- Princess Anne – Somerset County
- Easton – Talbot County
- Salisbury – Wicomico County
- Snow Hill – Worcester County

== See also ==
- Battle of Kedges Strait - the last naval engagement of the American Revolution
