= Assateague Beach Coast Guard Station =

- U.S. National Register of Historic Places
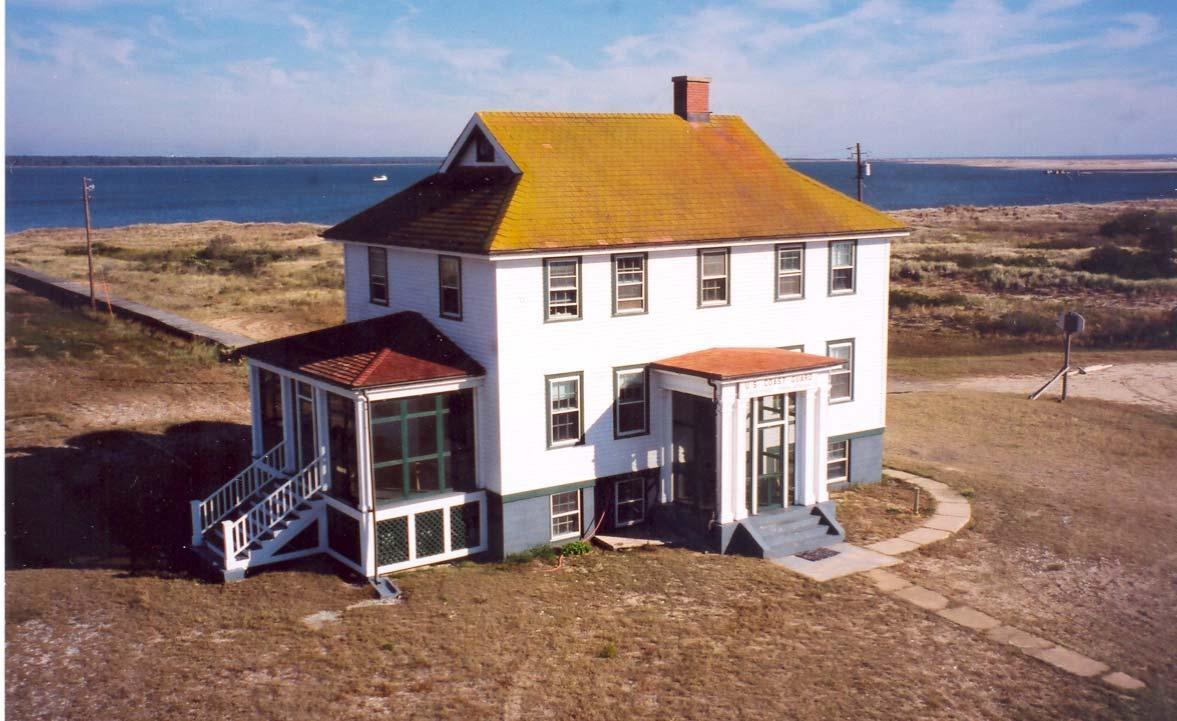
- National Park Service photo, 1999

- Location within Virginia
- Location: Beach St., Assateague Island National Seashore, Chincoteague, Virginia vicinity
- Coordinates: 37°51′50″N 75°22′5″W
- Built: 1922
- Built by: U.S. Coast Guard; civil engineer's office
- Architectural style: Colonial Revival
- NRHP reference No.: 15000766
- Added to NRHP: November 2, 2015

The Assateague Beach Coast Guard Station is a former facility of the United States Coast Guard in Accomack County, Virginia, United States. It is located at Toms Cove, a sheltered area on the western side of the southern end of Assateague Island, in the Assateague Island National Seashore. The station was originally built in 1874, facing the ocean. In 1922, due to shifting topography, it was relocated to face Toms Cove, and a new Colonial Revival station house was built. The old boathouse was converted into a garage in 1938–39. The station was formally decommissioned in 1967 and transferred to the National Park Service as part of the newly established National Seashore.

The former station was listed on the National Register of Historic Places in 2015.

== See also ==
- National Register of Historic Places listings in Accomack County, Virginia
- List of United States Coast Guard stations
