= Ilia Fehrer =

American environmentalist

- Born: Ilia Leonard; 1927
- Died: July 17, 2007 (aged 80); Salisbury, Maryland
- Education: Towson University
- Occupations: Environmental activist and teacher
- Spouse: Joseph W. Fehrer
- Children: Damien C. Fehrer, Douglas G. Fehrer, Christa Fehrer, Celeste Bunting, Melissa Fehrer, Michele Fehrer, John N. Fehrer
- Parents: Paul Leonard (father); Marie J. Leonard (mother)
- Relatives: Ianthe Leonard (sister)

Ilia Fehrer (née Leonard; 1927 – July 17, 2007) was an environmentalist and member of the Maryland Women's Hall of Fame most widely known for fighting to preserve Assateague Island, Chincoteague Bay, and other Chesapeake Bay coastal regions from destructive urban development.

== Early life ==
Ilia Fehrer, born Ilia Leonard, was born and raised on a small farm in Maryland. Leonard and her family moved to Baltimore in 1942. There she received her high school diploma and eventually attended Towson University to become a teacher. In 1948, she married Joseph W. Fehrer, a member of the Army Corps of Engineers, at 19 years old. They had seven children together. In 1971, Fehrer and her husband moved to Snow Hill in Worcester County in order for her husband to work as the chief of land acquisition for the National Park Service, specifically on the Assateague Island National Seashore.

== Career and impact ==
Both of the Fehrers heavily involved themselves in the local community. They heard of plans to build Harbour Town, a new resort along the shore of the Chincoteague Bay that would potentially have many negative environmental impacts. Ilia Fehrer spent the following years attending town hall meetings and hearings, some locally and some before congress, arguing against development in order to protect the seashores of Assateague Island, Chincoteague Bay, and other Chesapeake coastal regions. She eventually founded the Worcester Environmental Trust with her husband. The Trust worked to protect local lands. Because of Fehrer's work, the court rejected the plans for Harbour Town, which is what Fehrer is most widely known for.

Later, she worked closely with Judith Johnson as part of the Committee to Preserve Assateague, an island off of the Delmarva Peninsula. Despite being declared a National Seashore, Assateague was at risk of urbanization, so Ilia Fehrer, Johnson, and their colleagues fought to prevent the island from being developed. The island was widely used by many locals. Urban development would have displaced not only the locals, but many species of plants and animals. The Committee to Preserve Assateague exists today as The Assateague Coastal Trust.

Fehrer and her husband worked on various other environmental projects, including starting the process of creating a water-monitoring program. She also prevented the building of a harmful dam on Nassawango Creek in the 1980s, and protected the surrounding forest which spanned 10,000 acres. Fehrer actively fought against offshore waste incarceration and worked to provide her community with clean water.

== Awards and recognitions ==
In 1987, the SUNY college of Environmental Science and Forestry awarded Fehrer and her husband the Feinstone Environmental Award. Fehrer and her husband also both received the very first Osprey Award for their efforts to protect Chesapeake coastal regions in 2002. In 2003, Ilia Fehrer was awarded the Ellen Fraites Wagner Award by the Chesapeake Bay Trust for her dedication to the environment. In 2009, she was inducted into the Maryland Women's Hall of Fame.

== Death and legacy ==
Ilia Fehrer died on July 17, 2007, at 80 years old. Fehrer founded The Maryland Coastal Bays Program, which works to allow for simultaneous economic and environmental growth, and is still very active today. Assateague Island’s state and national parks can be attributed to the work of Fehrer and her colleagues, along with the Nassawango Creek Preserve and the Worcester County rural legacy area. After her death, Worcester County named a 441 acre forest on Assateague Island after her, the Ilia Fehrer Nature Preserve. The Assateague Coastal Trust honors Fehrer by leading a nature walk, the Ilia Fehrer & Judith Johnson Memorial Beach Walk, in her name every New Years Day.
