= Assateague State Park =

State park in Maryland, United States

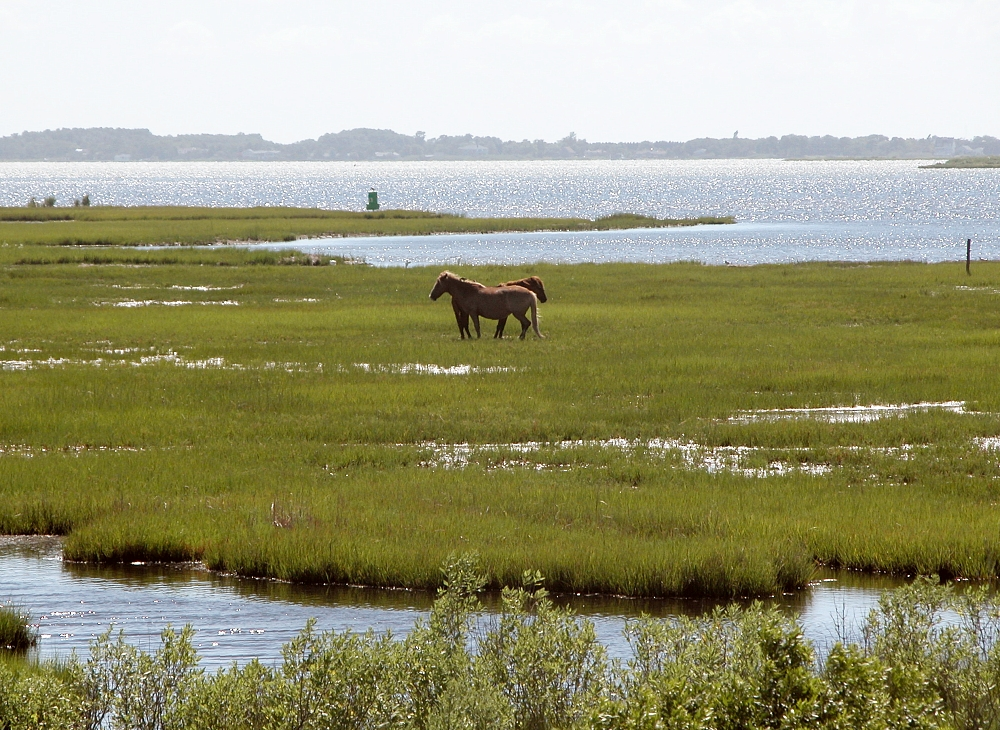
- Feral horses in Assateague State Park

- Location within Maryland
- Location: Worcester County, Maryland, United States
- Nearest city: Ocean City, Maryland
- Coordinates: 38°15′10″N 75°7′40″W
- Area: 855 acres (346 ha)
- Elevation: 3 ft (0.91 m)
- Established: 1956
- Administrator: Maryland Department of Natural Resources
- Designation: Maryland state park
- Website: Official website

Assateague State Park is a Maryland state park located in Worcester County, Maryland, located at the north end of Assateague Island, a barrier island bordered by the Atlantic Ocean on the east and Sinepuxent Bay on the west. The park is bordered on both its north and south sides by Assateague Island National Seashore and is reached via the Verrazano Bridge which carries Maryland Route 611 across Sinepuxent Bay. The park offers wildlife viewing, beach activities, and camping facilities. It is managed by the Maryland Park Service of the larger Maryland Department of Natural Resources with the support of volunteers working under the auspices of the non-profit Friends of Assateague State Park.

== History ==
State planners suggested establishing a state park on Assateague Island in 1940 and again in 1952. The park was finally created in 1956 when the state Board of Public Works accepted a gift of 220 ha (540 acres) from North Ocean Beach, Incorporated. Funds for further acquisitions were allocated by the General Assembly of Maryland in 1959 and 1962, with funding for facility development allocated in 1965.

=== First Day Hikes ===
A tradition of New Year's Day walks in the park began on January 1, 1980, the same year President Jimmy Carter proclaimed "Year of the Coast." The walk was started by two women, Ilea Fehrer and Judy Johnson, founder of the Committee to Preserve Assateague Island (now known as the Assateague Coastal Trust), who sought to celebrate the beauty of the island and rally against plans to develop areas around it. It subsequently became an annual tradition, with the 40th iteration taking place in 2020, and became very popular over time, with people driving from various other parts of the state to join in with up to 300 others. The Ilia Fehrer / Judy Johnson Memorial Beach Walk, named after the two women who started it, is now part of Maryland's roster of the nationwide offering of First Day Hikes in state parks.

== Wildlife ==
Wildlife found in the park's marsh areas include deer, waterfowl, and feral Assateague horses.

== Activities and amenities ==
Rackliffe House, which overlooks Sinepuxent Bay, is a restored 18th-century coastal plantation building that houses the Coastal Maryland Heritage Center. The park campground has 350 sites.

== See also ==
- Chincoteague National Wildlife Refuge
