= Grace Talbot =

American painter and sculptor (1901–1971)

Grace Helen Talbot
- Born: September 3, 1901; North Billerica, Massachusetts
- Died: March 22, 1971 (aged 69); Syosset, New York
- Other names: Grace Helen Talbot Randall
- Movement: Art Deco

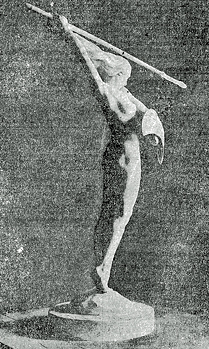
The Huntress Maid by Grace Talbot

Grace Helen Talbot (1901-1971) was an American sculptor known for her Art Deco pieces.

Talbot was born on September 3, 1901 in North Billerica, Massachusetts.

In 1926 she married Darley Randall with whom she had three children. Also in 1926 Talbot was the recipient of a medal from The National Association of Women Painters and Sculptors. Her work was part of the sculpture event in the art competition at the 1932 Summer Olympics.

Rieber died on March 22, 1971 in Syosset, New York. Her papers are in the Smithsonian Libraries and Archives.
