= Toms Cove =

Coordinates: 37°52′40″N 75°21′59″W

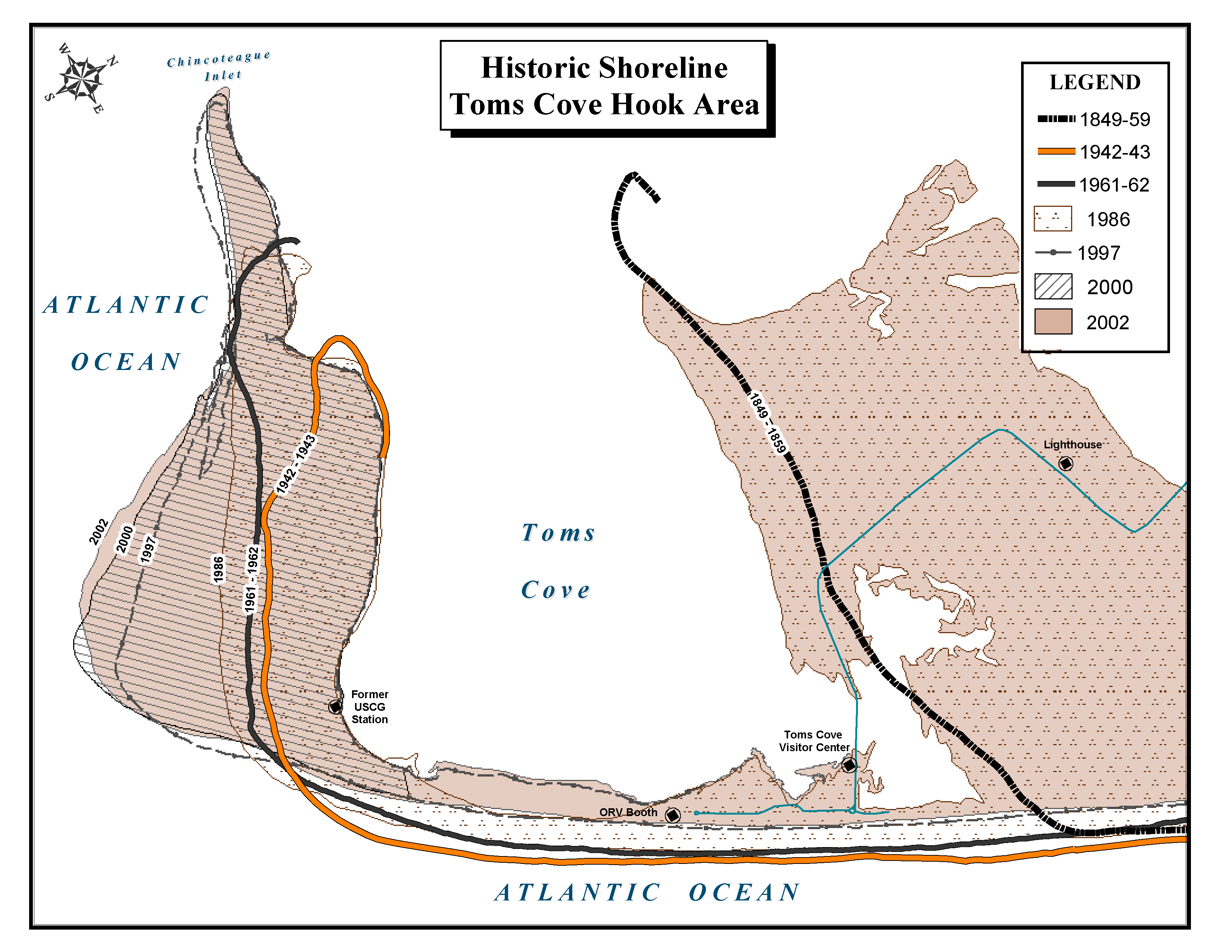
Toms Cove

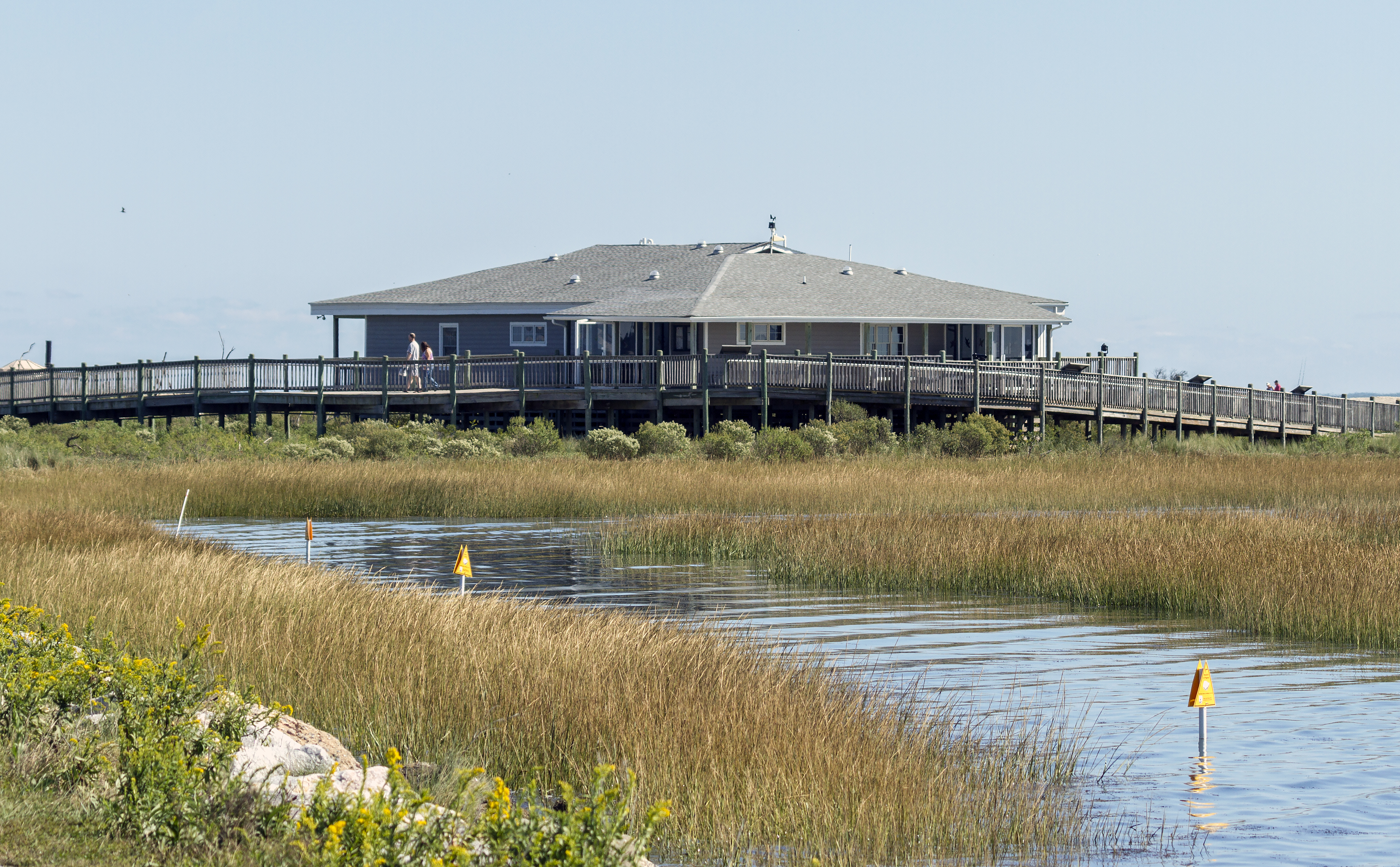
Toms Cove Visitor Center Assateague Island

Toms Cove is an embayment on the southern end of Assateague Island in Virginia with the mouth near Chincoteague Inlet. A U.S. Coast Guard station was located there. Toms Cove also contains the Toms Cove Visitor Center run by the U.S. National Park Service.
