= Assateague Island =

Barrier island in Maryland and Virginia, United States

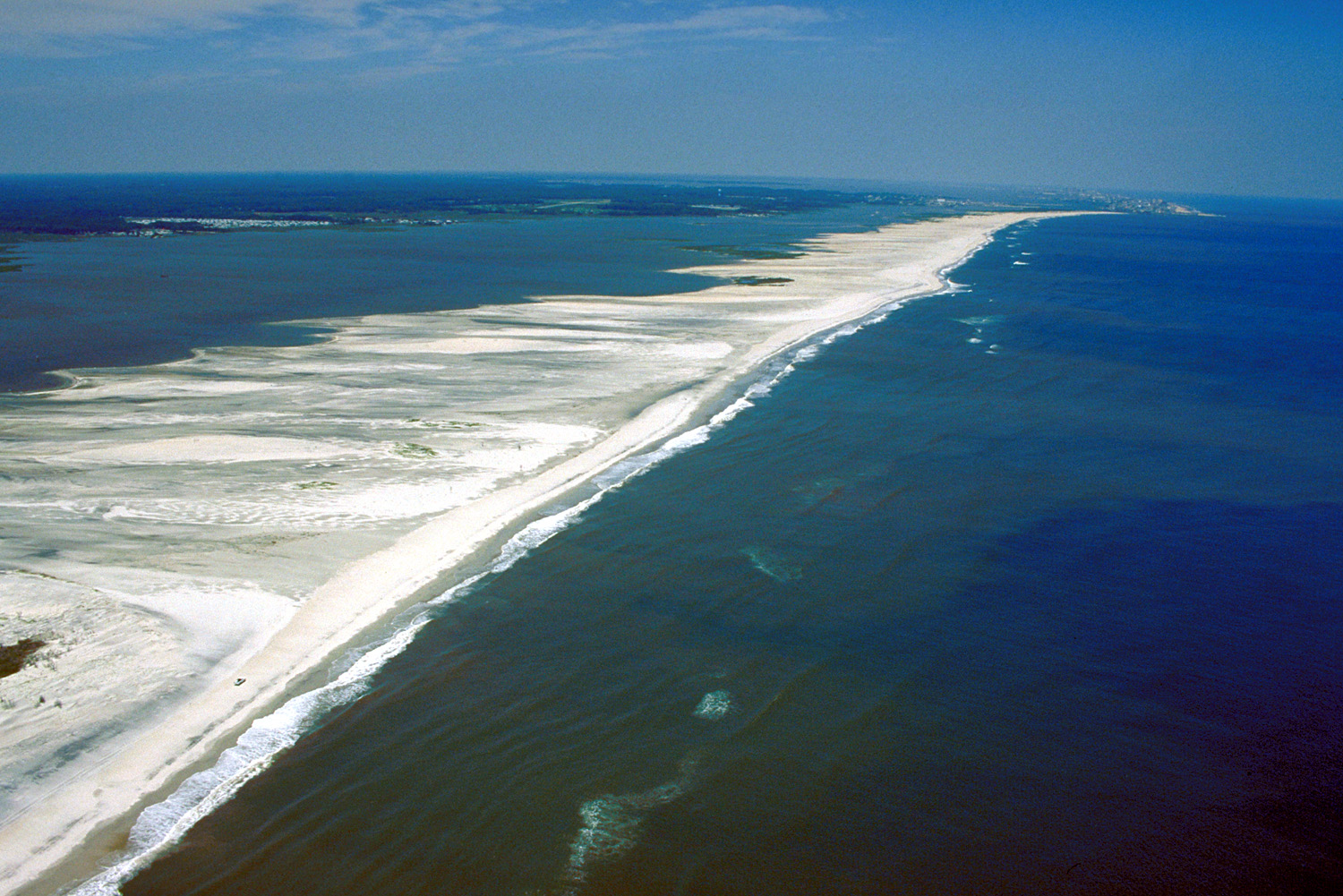
- Aerial view of Assateague Island with Ocean City, Maryland in the background

- Location within Maryland Location within Virginia Location within the United States

Geography
- Location: Atlantic Ocean
- Coordinates: 37°58′35.07″N 75°18′17.12″W
- Area: 63 km^{2} (24 sq mi)

Administration
- United States

Additional information
- Official website: Assateague Island National Seashore; Assateague State Park

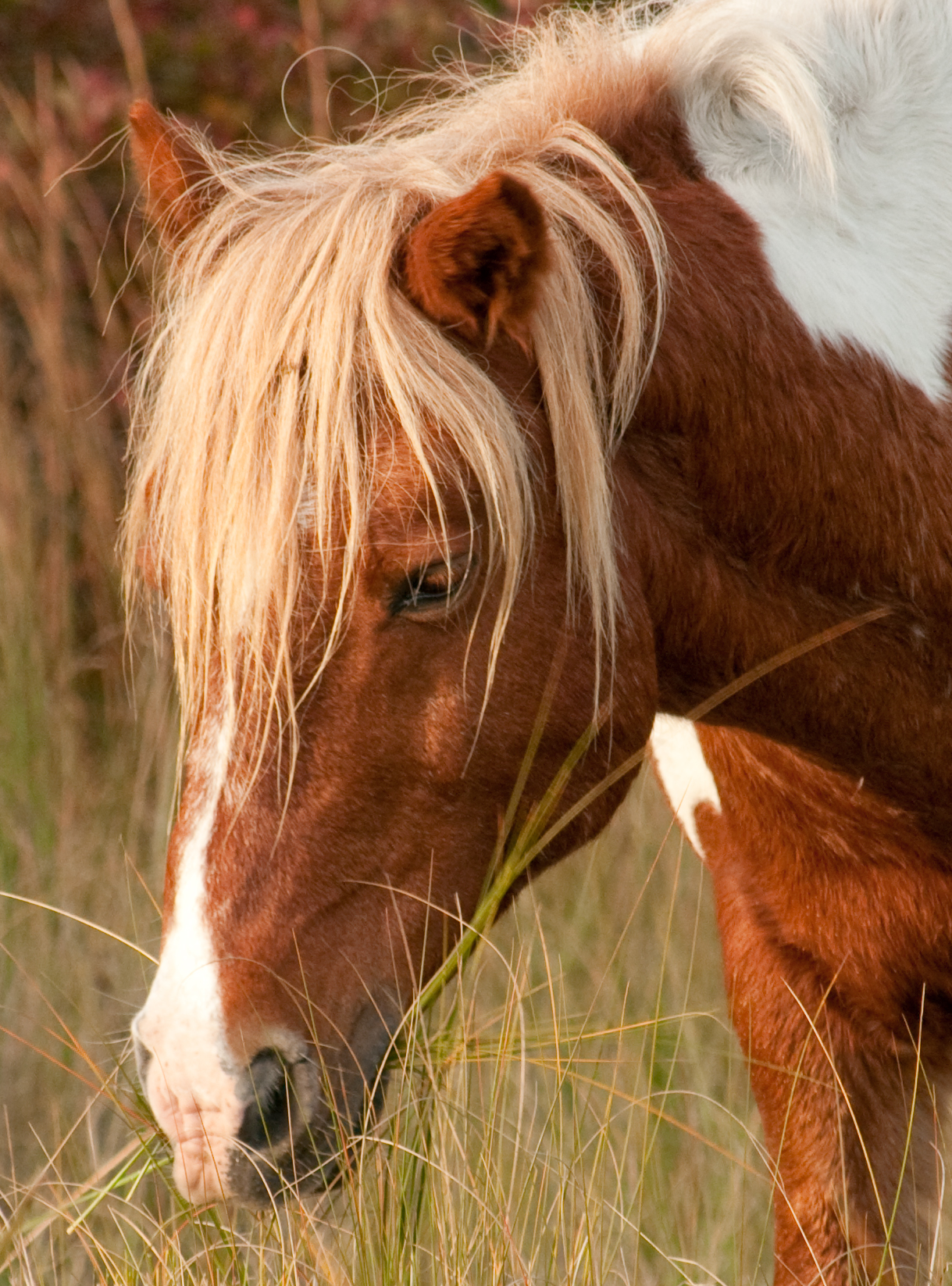
Assateague stallion

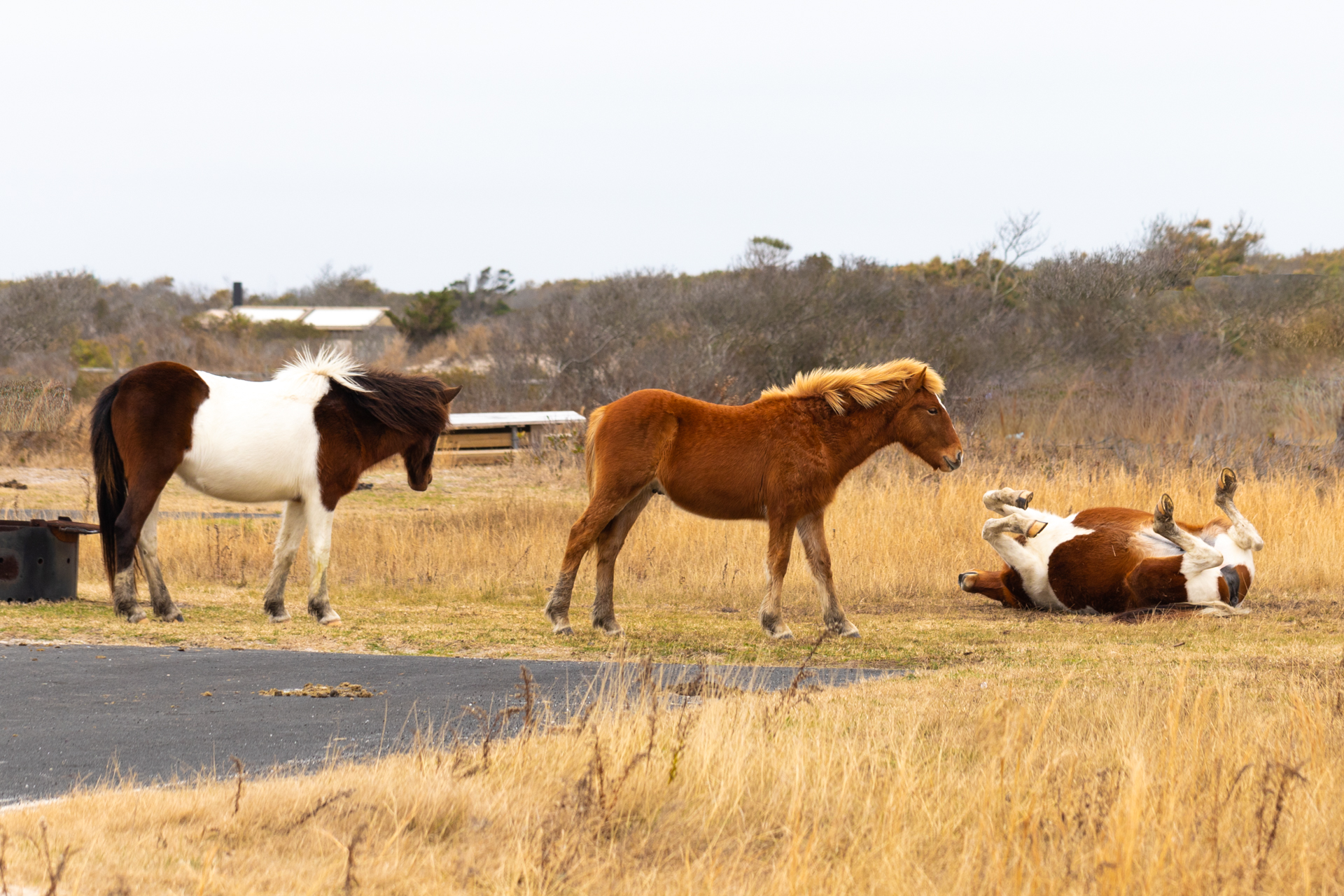
Horses play near an Assateague Island campsite

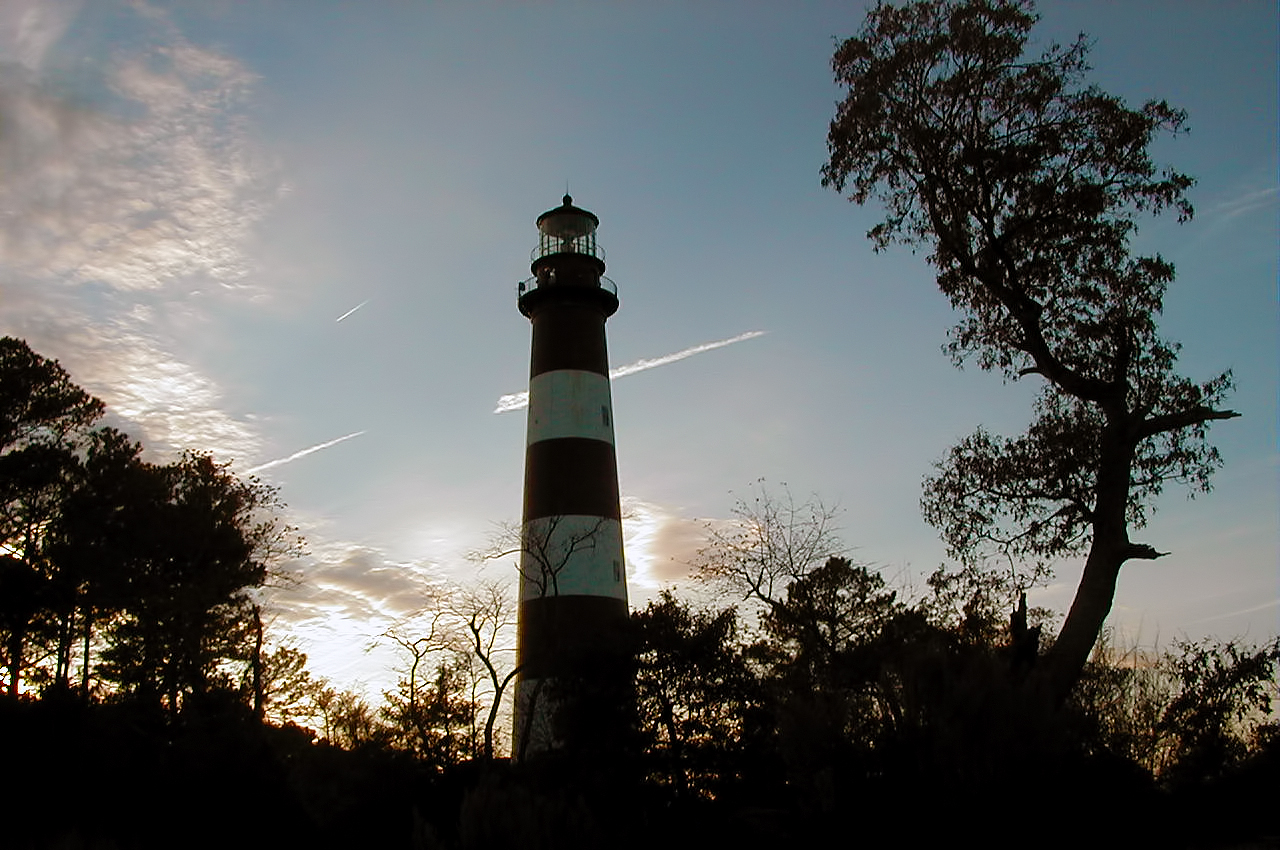
Assateague Lighthouse in 2001

Assateague Island is a 37-mile (60 km) long barrier island located off the eastern coast of the Delmarva Peninsula facing the Atlantic Ocean. The northern two-thirds of the island are in Maryland, and the southern third is in Virginia. The entire island is designated as Assateague Island National Seashore, though management is shared by three entities.

The Maryland section contains the majority of Assateague Island National Seashore and Assateague State Park. The Virginia section contains Chincoteague National Wildlife Refuge and a one-mile stretch of land containing the lifeguarded recreational beach and interpretive facilities managed by the National Park Service (NPS). It is best known for its herds of feral horses, pristine beaches, and the Assateague Lighthouse. The island also contains numerous marshes, bays, and coves, including Toms Cove. Bridge access for cars is possible from both Maryland and Virginia, though no road runs the full north-south length of the island.

== History ==
Like all barrier islands, Assateague has changed in form over the years. The structure of barrier islands is determined by movement of sand in the littoral zone, the portion of the ocean closest to the seaward side of the island.

The island was once connected to the southern end of Fenwick Island. However, the 1933 Chesapeake–Potomac hurricane created an inlet south of Ocean City, Maryland. This inlet separated the two landforms. Normally, it would have silted back due to the littoral drift that ran from north to south. However, after the storm, between 1933 and 1935, a permanent system of artificial jetties was built to preserve the inlet as a navigation channel. As a result, the island has drifted considerably westward, and the two landmasses are now over 0.62 miles (1.00 km) apart. While this process has benefitted Ocean City, creating wider beaches and better fishing access, it caused erosion problems on Assateague.

Between 1933 and the early 1960s, U.S. federal government interest in creating a national seashore on the island alternated with periodic pushes for development. In 1950, a 15-mile section of the Maryland side of Assateague was plotted for development, and a paved road, Baltimore Boulevard, was constructed to traverse the new development. The Ash Wednesday Storm of 1962 destroyed or covered most of Baltimore Boulevard, and many of the structures on the island were destroyed. Although some private landowners on the island supported re-development, by this time the state of Maryland generally supported a national seashore and legislation was introduced in the United States Congress. After Congressional efforts did not produce final legislation in 1964, new legislation in 1965 was successful and Assateague Island National Seashore was formed.

== Parks and refuge ==
The entirety of Assateague Island is owned and operated by three different agencies: the NPS, Maryland State Parks, and United States Fish and Wildlife Service. All of the land on the island north of the Maryland-Virginia state line is the Assateague Island National Seashore, with the exception of the smaller Assateague State Park. The national seashore was established in 1965 to preserve the barrier island and surrounding waters, and provide recreational opportunities.

All of the island south of the state border in Virginia is the Chincoteague National Wildlife Refuge, with the exception of a one-mile stretch of land including the recreational beach and interpretive facilities managed by the NPS. The Refuge was established in 1943 to provide habitat for migratory birds, primarily snow geese. The U.S. Geological Survey has initiated studies aimed at mitigating the potential sea-level rise on this barrier island complex.

== Human use of the island ==
The National Park Service allows off-road vehicles with permits in certain areas. Car camping sites are available in both the National Seashore and Assateague State Park by reservation. Backcountry sites are also available in the National Seashore. There is no camping available in the Chincoteague National Wildlife Refuge. Pets are prohibited in all areas except certain parts of the National Seashore and parts of the state park. Kayak touring is a popular way to see the wildlife, especially on the calmer bay side. Summer months are known for heavy mosquito and biting greenhead fly populations, particularly on the bay side.

Assateague State Park comprises almost 800 acres (3.2 km^{2}) and lies in Maryland within the National Seashore. The state park is the most developed area on the island with 350 campsites. Most of the water around the island is within the boundaries of the national seashore. The island has a land area of 24.4 square miles (63 km^{2}) and has no resident population in either Maryland or Virginia, though a few retained property rights until 2006. These were mainly hunting camps.

== Fauna ==
Large populations of birds inhabit the island, including American oystercatcher, great blue heron, and snowy egret. There are over 320 species that are known to inhabit the island during some portion of the year. These include gulls, terns, and other shorebirds along with raptors, waterbirds, and waterfowl. The piping plover is a threatened species that nests on Assateague.

The feral horse population of Assateague Island is alternately known as the Assateague horse in Maryland and the Chincoteague pony in Virginia. This distinction, made both on per-breed and per-individual basis, is sometimes a matter of disagreement. The traditional definition of a horse or a pony is based on whether the animal in question falls over or under 14.2 hands (58 inches, 147 cm). The equines on the island tend to be under 14.2, but have a horse phenotype. It is argued that their relatively small size is primarily due to environmental, rather than genetic conditions. The National Park Service provides information about these animals through brochures and the internet.

The Maryland and Virginia horses are kept apart by fencing at the border between the two states. Though commonly called "wild," these horses had domesticated ancestors. Legend states their ancestors were survivors of a Spanish galleon that shipwrecked along the coast, and DNA evidence indicates the modern population includes the closest living descendants of Spanish horses brought to the Americas in the early 1500s. Previously, it was suggested the horses originated from late-17th-century mainland owners who brought their horses to the barrier islands to avoid fencing laws and taxation. When excess numbers are removed from the island and they are placed into human ownership, they adapt quickly to domestication. Made famous by Marguerite Henry in her children's book Misty of Chincoteague, the animals are popular tourist attractions and subjects for photography.

The Maryland horses are owned and managed by the NPS, who have carefully followed the population over generations. In Virginia, the Chincoteague ponies are owned by the Chincoteague Volunteer Fire Company. Once a year in July, the local "salt water cowboys" round them up and sort a number of animals to be removed from the island, which are put up for auction on Pony Penning Day.

To keep their numbers under control on the Maryland side, a federal contraceptive program has been in place since 1994. In Virginia, the Pony Penning Days auction keeps the horse population at levels required by agreement with the Chincoteague National Wildlife Refuge.

== Climate ==
Assateague Island has a humid subtropical climate and is classified in hardiness Zone 8a.

Climate data for Assateague, Maryland, 1991–2020 normals
| Month | Jan | Feb | Mar | Apr | May | Jun | Jul | Aug | Sep | Oct | Nov | Dec | Year |
|---|---|---|---|---|---|---|---|---|---|---|---|---|---|
| Mean daily maximum °F (°C) | 46.7 (8.2) | 48.4 (9.1) | 53.7 (12.1) | 62.9 (17.2) | 71.7 (22.1) | 80.9 (27.2) | 86.1 (30.1) | 85.4 (29.7) | 80.3 (26.8) | 71.7 (22.1) | 60.4 (15.8) | 51.7 (10.9) | 66.7 (19.3) |
| Daily mean °F (°C) | 38.6 (3.7) | 40.5 (4.7) | 45.6 (7.6) | 54.0 (12.2) | 62.8 (17.1) | 72.0 (22.2) | 77.2 (25.1) | 76.6 (24.8) | 72.3 (22.4) | 62.5 (16.9) | 51.3 (10.7) | 43.4 (6.3) | 58.1 (14.5) |
| Mean daily minimum °F (°C) | 30.5 (−0.8) | 32.6 (0.3) | 37.4 (3.0) | 45.0 (7.2) | 53.9 (12.2) | 63.1 (17.3) | 68.2 (20.1) | 67.7 (19.8) | 64.4 (18.0) | 53.4 (11.9) | 42.3 (5.7) | 35.0 (1.7) | 49.5 (9.7) |
| Average precipitation inches (mm) | 3.39 (86) | 3.29 (84) | 4.24 (108) | 3.39 (86) | 3.20 (81) | 3.50 (89) | 4.21 (107) | 4.20 (107) | 4.50 (114) | 3.94 (100) | 3.02 (77) | 4.00 (102) | 44.88 (1,140) |
| Average snowfall inches (cm) | 1.8 (4.6) | 1.0 (2.5) | 0.4 (1.0) | 0.0 (0.0) | 0.0 (0.0) | 0.0 (0.0) | 0.0 (0.0) | 0.0 (0.0) | 0.0 (0.0) | 0.0 (0.0) | 0.0 (0.0) | 0.2 (0.51) | 3.4 (8.6) |
| Average precipitation days (≥ 0.01 in) | 10.1 | 9.1 | 11.0 | 10.3 | 10.4 | 9.4 | 9.4 | 8.2 | 7.9 | 8.4 | 7.7 | 10.7 | 112.6 |
| Average snowy days (≥ 0.1 in) | 0.6 | 0.7 | 0.4 | 0.0 | 0.0 | 0.0 | 0.0 | 0.0 | 0.0 | 0.0 | 0.0 | 0.3 | 2.0 |
Source: NOAA

== Gallery ==
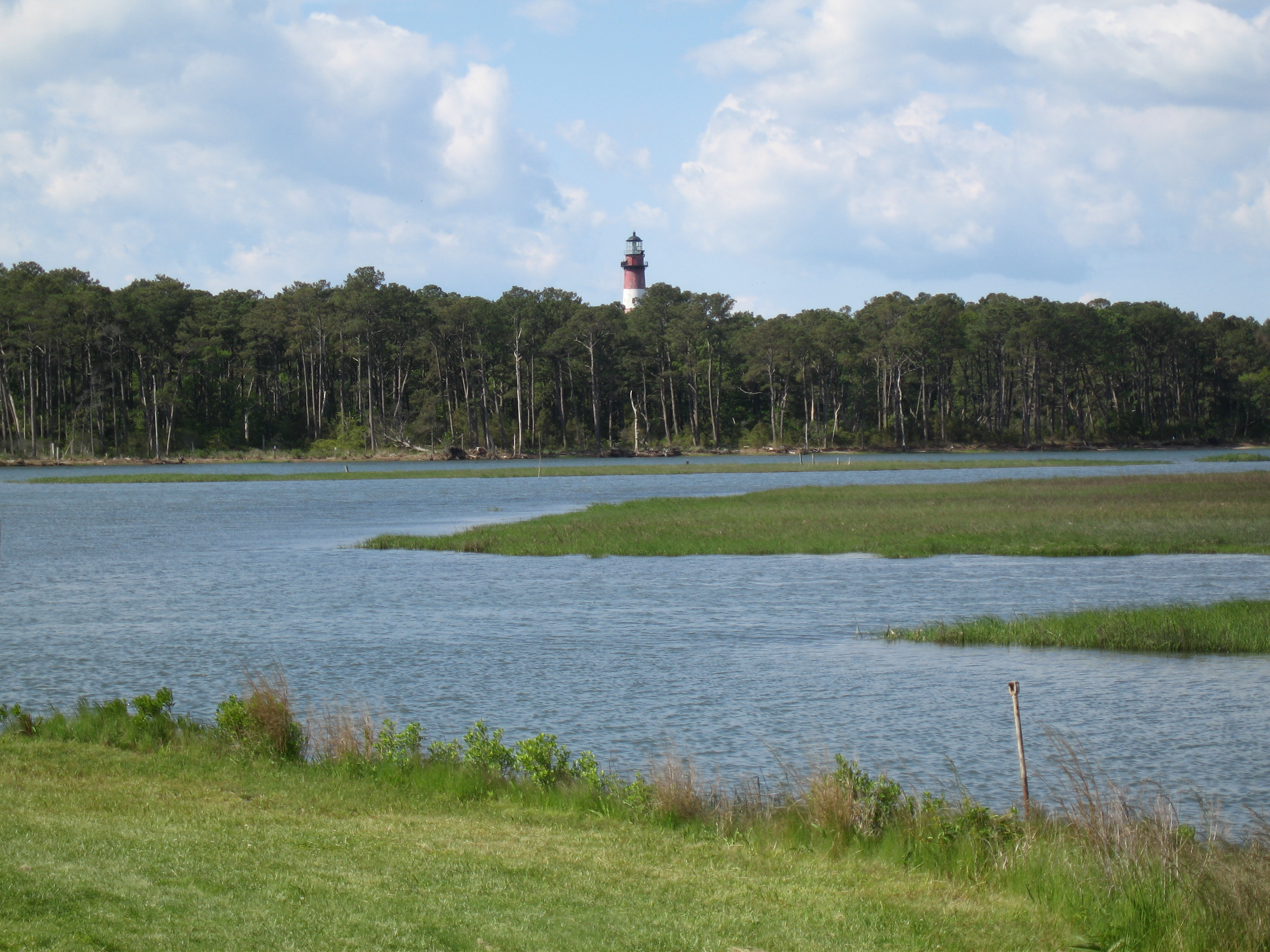
Chincoteague National Wildlife Refuge with lighthouse in distance

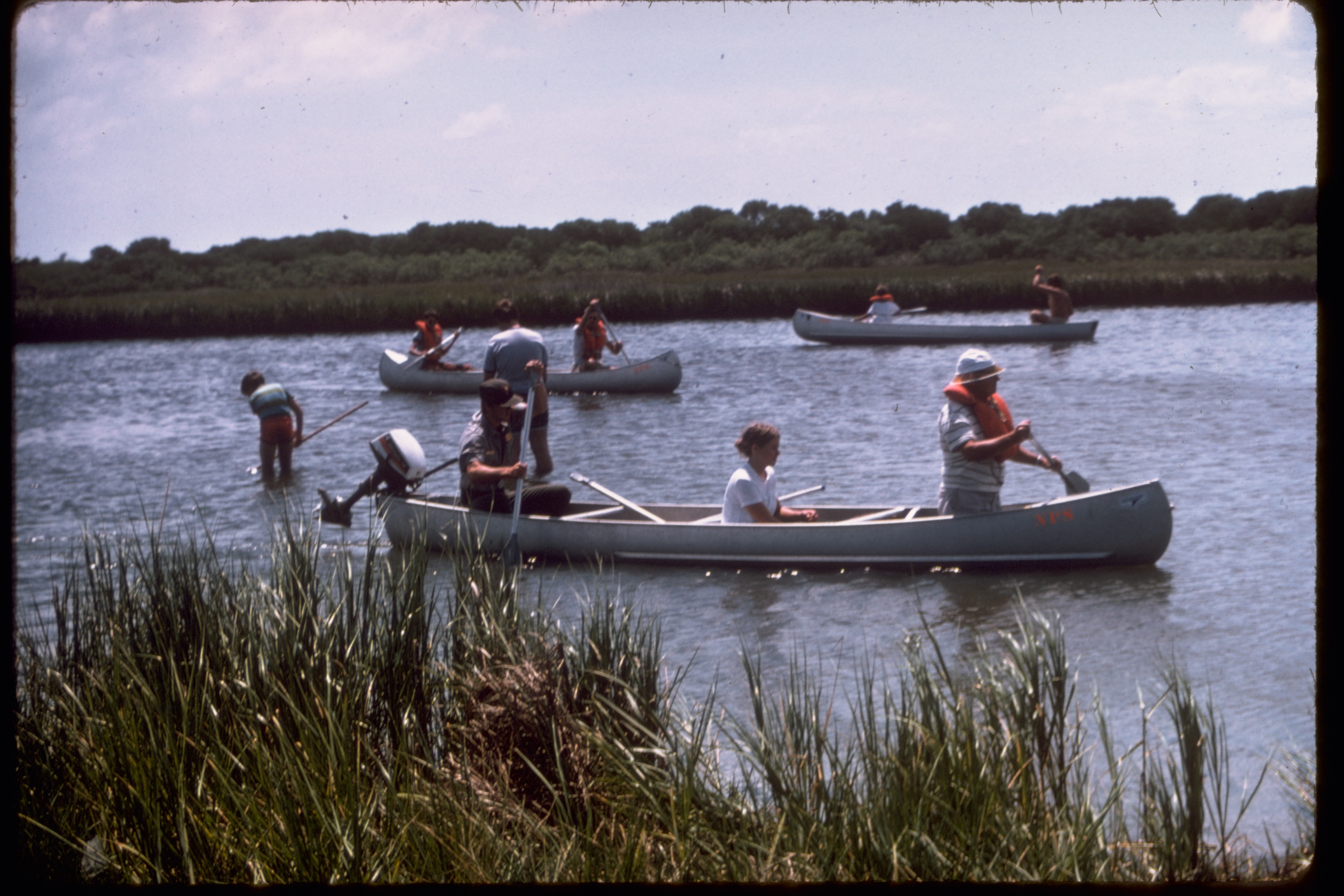
Assateague Island waterways

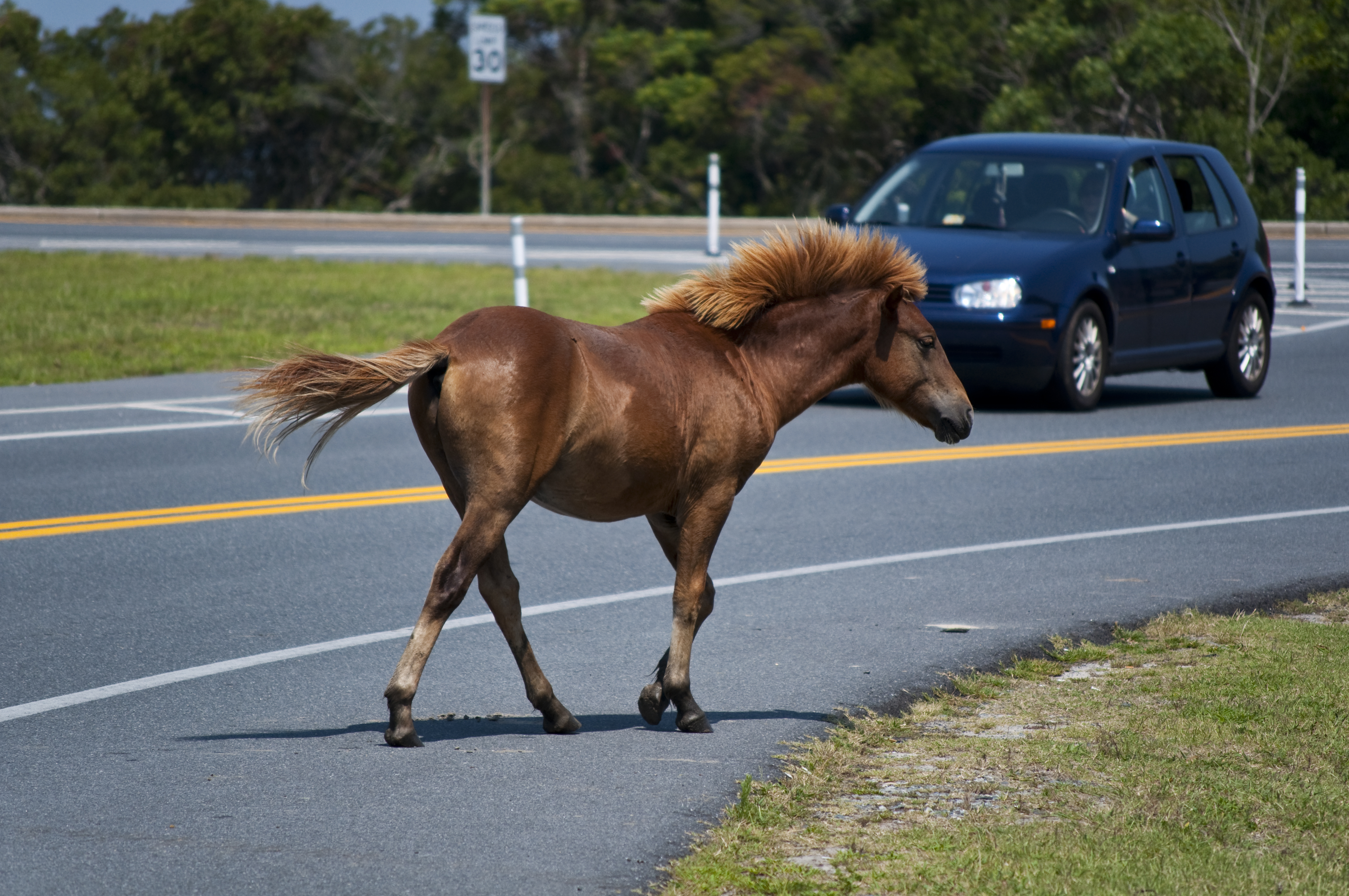
Humans and horses on the island

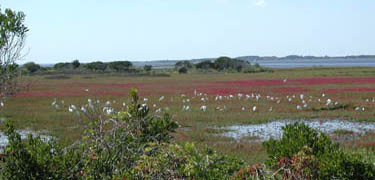
Egrets in Assateague's marshes

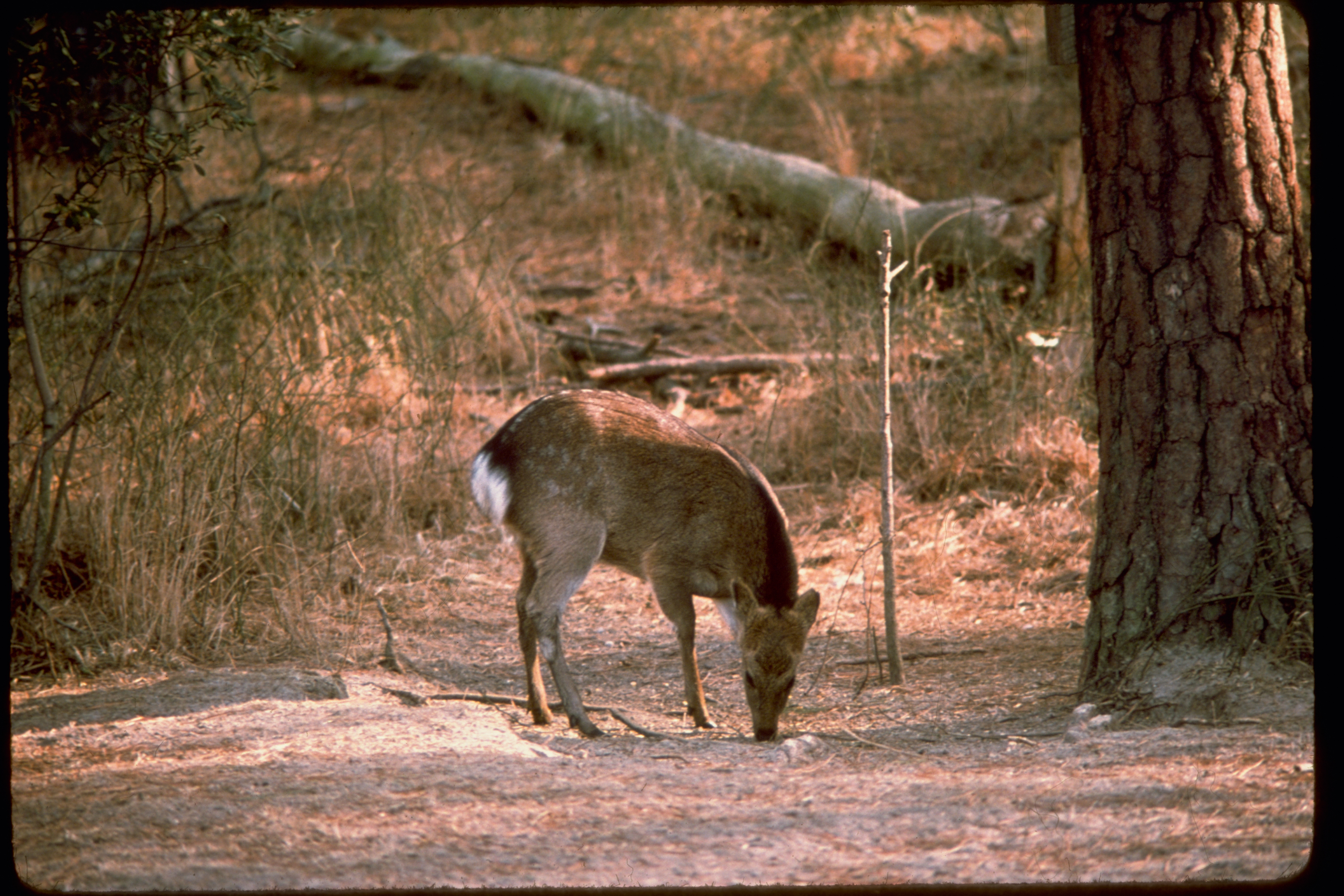
Deer on Assateague

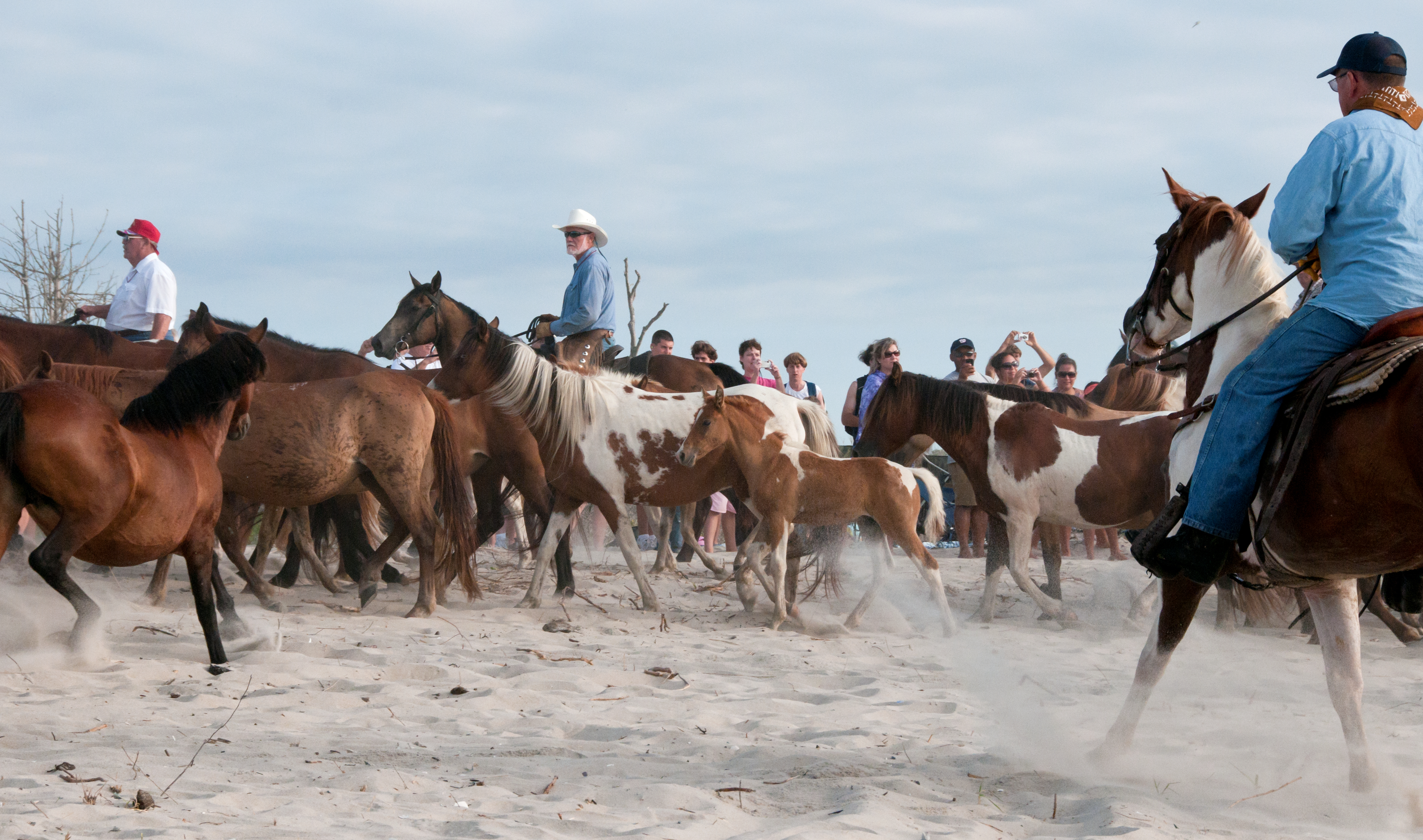
Saltwater cowboys round up ponies on Assateague and herd them down the beach at sunrise

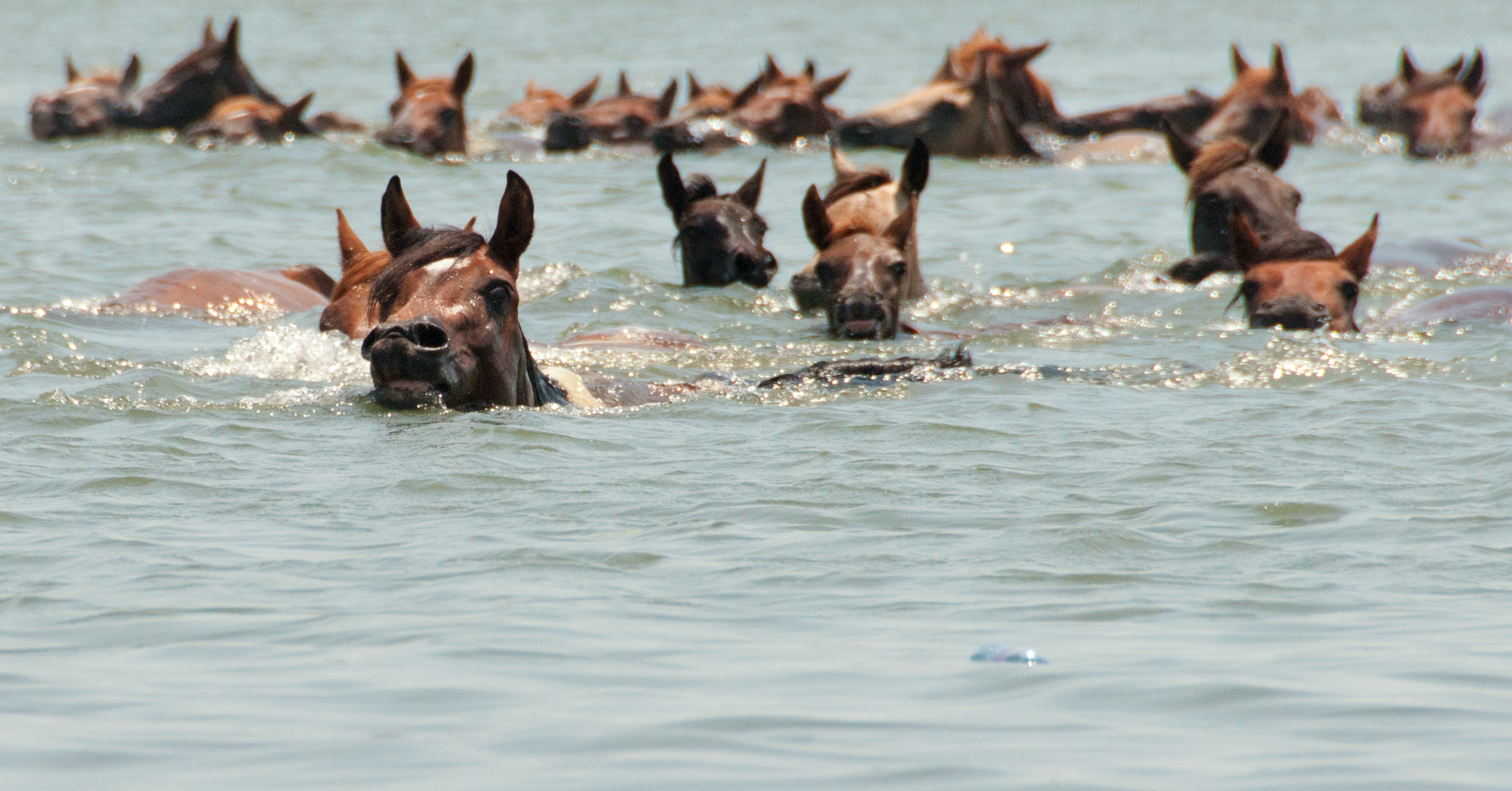
Swimming from Assateague for Pony Penning Day on Chincoteague

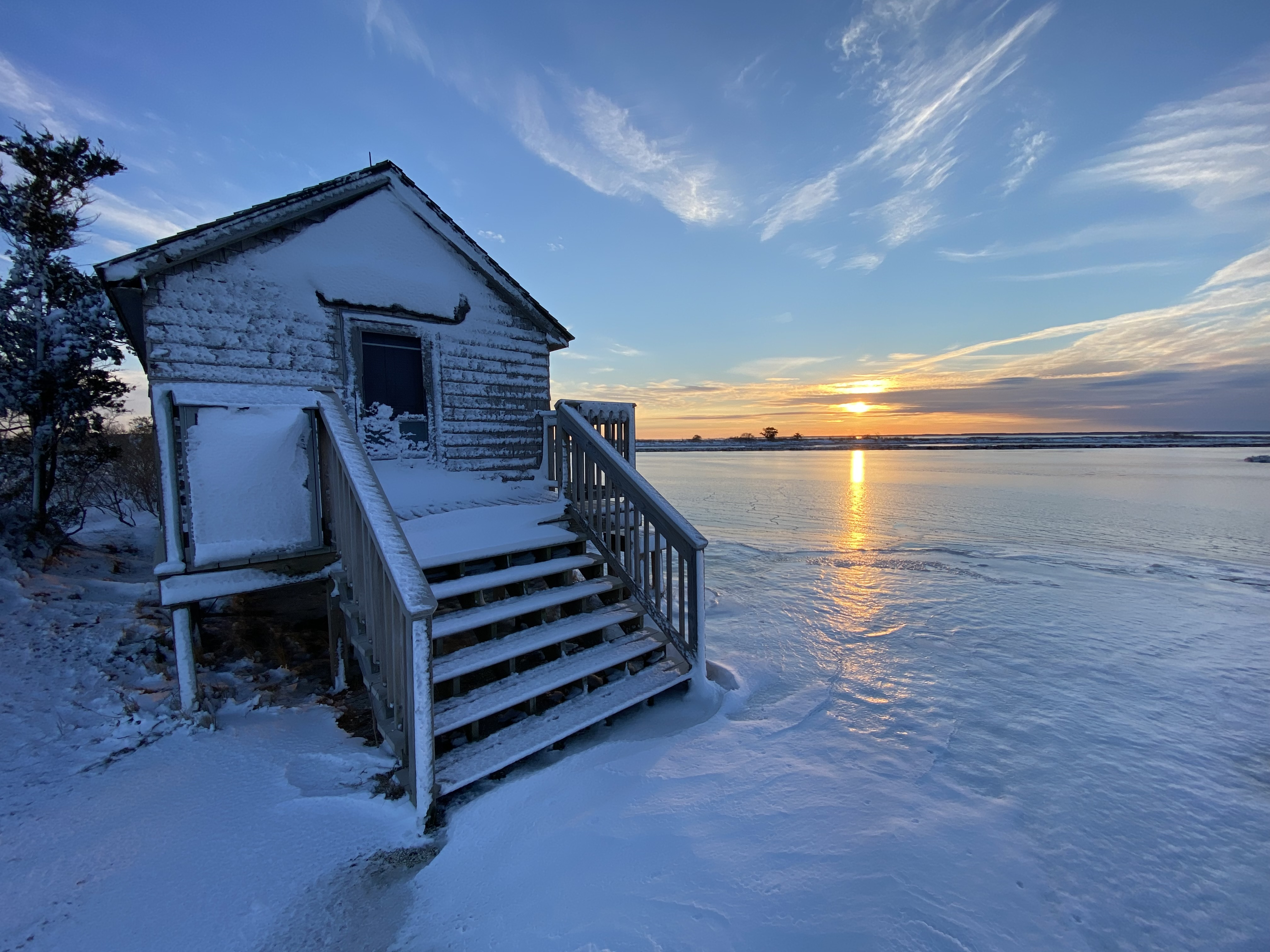
A winter scene on Assateague Island in January 2022

| Preceded by Ocean City | Beaches of Delmarva | Succeeded by Wallops Island |
