= Assateague Island National Seashore =

Barrier island operated by the National Park Service of the United States

- IUCN category V (protected landscape/seascape)
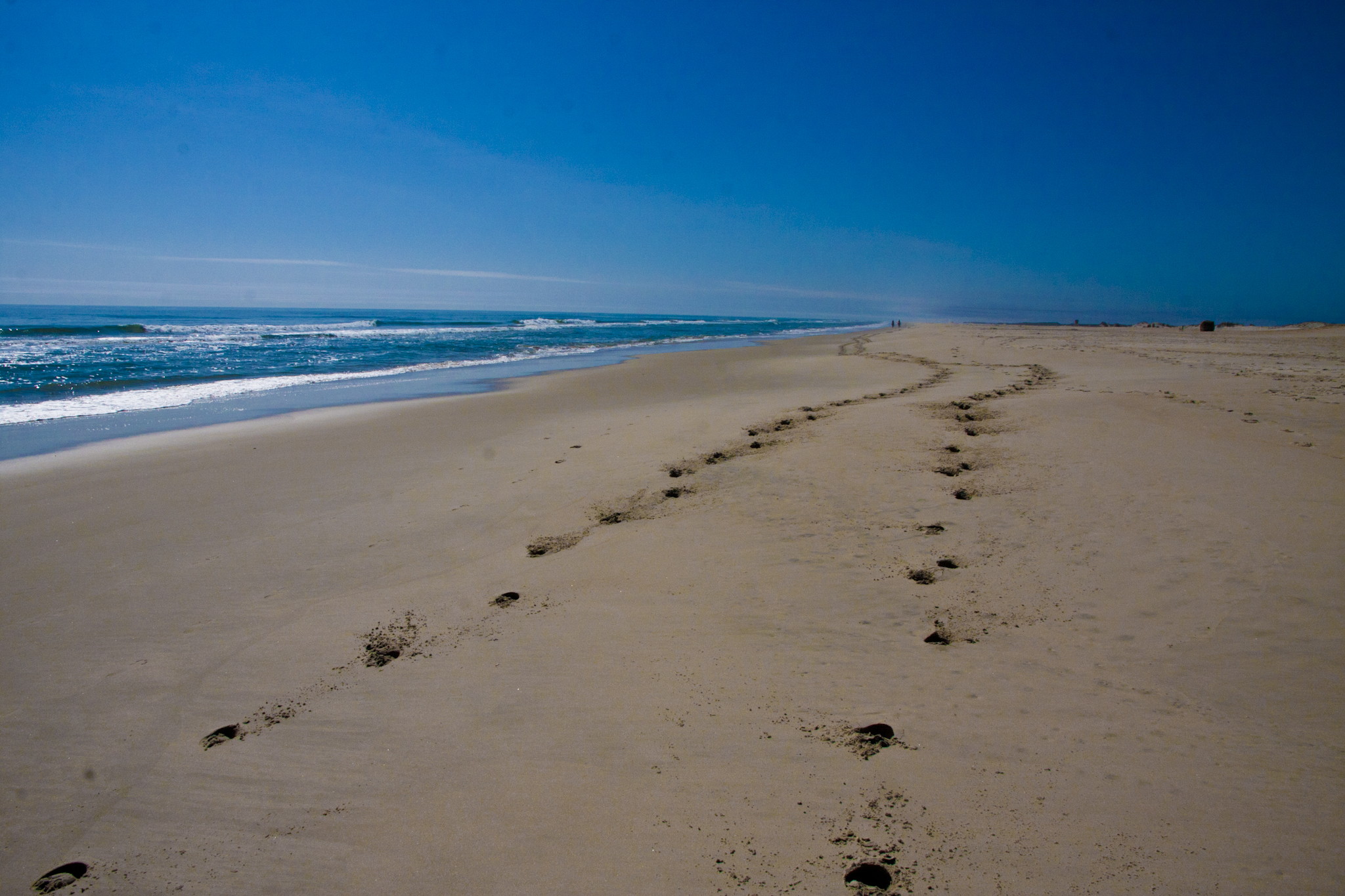
- Horses tracks on the shore of Assateague Island National Seashore

- Location within Maryland Location within Virginia Location within the United States
- Location: Worcester County, Maryland and Accomack County, Virginia, US
- Nearest city: Ocean City, Maryland and Chincoteague, Virginia
- Coordinates: 38°05′00″N 75°12′30″W
- Area: 41,320 acres (167.2 km^{2})
- Authorized: January 1, 1965
- Visitors: 2,325,195 (in 2025)
- Governing body: National Park Service
- Website: Assateague Island National Seashore

Assateague Island National Seashore is a unit of the National Park Service system of the U.S. Department of the Interior. Located on the East Coast along the Atlantic Ocean in Maryland and Virginia, Assateague Island is the largest natural barrier island ecosystem in the Middle Atlantic states region that remains predominantly unaffected by human development. Located within a three-hour drive from Richmond, Washington, Baltimore, Wilmington, Philadelphia and major metropolitan areas, plus being north of the several clustered smaller cities around the Hampton Roads harbor of Virginia including Newport News, Hampton, Norfolk, Portsmouth, Chesapeake and Virginia Beach, the National Seashore offers a setting in which to experience a dynamic barrier island and to pursue a multitude of recreational opportunities. The stated mission of the park is to preserve and protect "unique coastal resources and the natural ecosystem conditions and processes upon which they depend, provide high-quality resource-based recreational opportunities compatible with resource protection and educate the public as to the values and significance of the area."

Assateague Island encompasses a 37-mile-long barrier island, adjacent marsh islands and waters in Maryland and Virginia, and the Assateague Island Visitor Center on the Maryland mainland. 41,346 acres of land and water are within the seashore's boundaries. The island consists of three public areas; Assateague Island National Seashore (managed by the National Park Service), Assateague State Park (managed by the Maryland Park Service of the Department of Natural Resources) and Chincoteague National Wildlife Refuge (managed by the U.S. Fish and Wildlife Service).

== Geography ==
The park is located on a barrier island shaped by the stormy seas and gentle winds along the coast of the Delmarva Peninsula. The island is approximately 37 miles (60 km) long, yet never more than a mile wide. The park is divided into the Maryland District in the north and the Virginia District in the south. It is not possible to drive down the island from one district to the other. All automobile traffic must travel through the mainland to access one end of the island from the other.

The Maryland District of Assateague Island extends from the Ocean City Inlet to the Virginia state line. The Assateague Island National Seashore visitor center, campground, three nature trails, lifeguarded beach, and park headquarters and the smaller Assateague State Park sits within the borders of this district. The only access to the Maryland District is via the Verrazano Bridge on Maryland Route 611.

The Virginia District of Assateague Island extends from the Maryland state line south to the Chincoteague Inlet. This area of the island is designated as the Chincoteague National Wildlife Refuge and is managed by the US Fish and Wildlife Service (FWS). However, the National Park Service operates with a recreational beach, lifeguarded area and visitor center within a one-mile parking and visitor use section. This collaboration between the US Fish and Wildlife Service and the National Park Service is defined in an agreement or Memorandum of Understanding. The Chincoteague National Wildlife Refuge on the southern end of Assateague Island should not be confused with Chincoteague Island, the neighboring island to the west with a residential community on it. One must drive through Chincoteague Island in order to reach the Virginia District.

=== Geology and hydrology ===
Assateague Island is part of a chain of barrier islands that extend from Maine to Texas. The island is built from sand moving south via longshore drift building the island's length. The source of the sand is erosion and run-off from the Appalachian Mountains. The island is moving westward as a result of natural barrier processes during storms. Water washes over the island, sending beach sand backward toward the bay. This barrier island "rollover" is accelerated as the climate changes and the sea level rises. This condition is most pronounced at the northern end of the island, where Ocean City's jetties have stabilized the islands north of the Ocean City Inlet and have starved Assateague of new sand. As a result, Assateague's beach is shifted several hundred meters westwards compared to Ocean City's. The inlet was formed during the 1933 Chesapeake–Potomac hurricane, separating Fenwick and Assateague islands, and a jetty was immediately constructed to stabilize the inlet. After severe nor'easters in 1998, a sand replenishment program was undertaken to restore a sand supply to the north end of Assateague and to ensure a continuing supply.

== History ==
Assateague Island National Seashore
- Long title: An Act to provide for the establishment of the Assateague Island National Seashore in the States of Maryland and Virginia, and for other purposes.
- Enacted by: the 89th United States Congress
- Effective: September 21, 1965

Citations
- Public law: Pub. L. 89–195
- Statutes at Large: 79 Stat. 824

Codification
- Titles amended: Title 16—Conservation
- U.S.C. sections created: 16 U.S.C. §§ 459f–459f-10

Legislative history
- Introduced in the Senate as S. 20 by Daniel Brewster (D–MD) on January 6, 1965; Committee consideration by Senate Interior and Insular Affairs; Passed the Senate on June 17, 1965 (unanimous consent); Passed the House on September 7, 1965 (unanimous consent) with amendment; Senate agreed to House amendment on September 15, 1965 (unanimous consent); Signed into law by President Lyndon B. Johnson on September 21, 1965

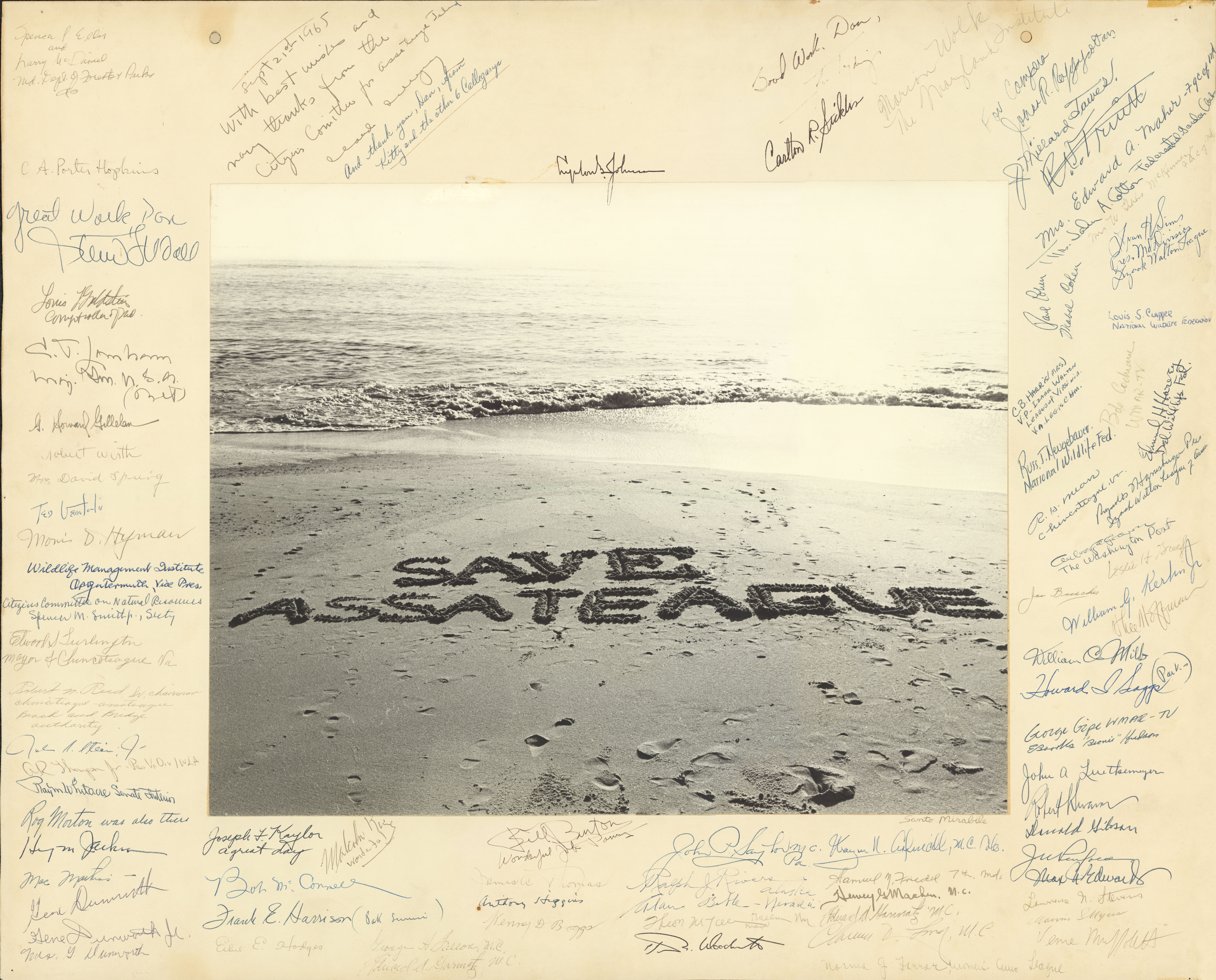
A photograph with “Save Assateague” in the sand signed by supporters of the Assateague Island legislation, including U.S. Senators Tydings, Jackson, and Bible, Maryland Governor Millard Tawes, and Baltimore Mayor Ted McKeldin. President Lyndon Johnson signed at the top before presenting the poster to the bill’s sponsor, Senator Brewster.

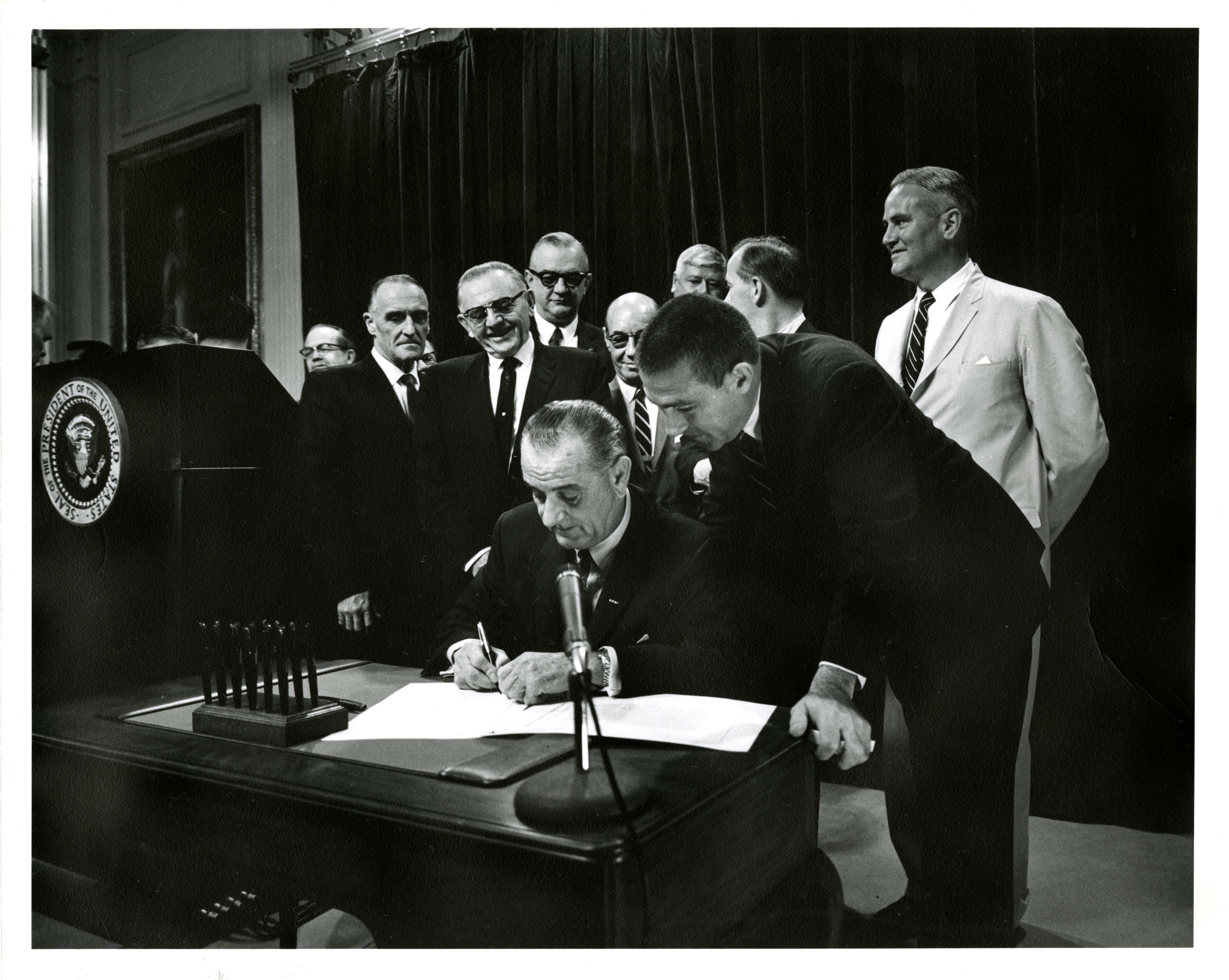
President Lyndon Johnson signing into law legislation creating the Assateague Island National Seashore. Secretary of the Interior Stewart Udall leans over the President, while bill sponsor Senator Daniel Brewster stands behind him.

Before the national seashore was created in 1965, the island was going to be turned into a private resort community called Ocean Beach, Maryland. Some 5,000 private lots comprising what is now NPS property were zoned and sold for resort development in the 1950s. However, the Ash Wednesday Storm of 1962 halted the plans for development. The nor'easter destroyed the few existing structures on the island that had been built and ripped the roads apart. Realizing that the island was too unstable to build upon, the housing development firm sold all of its land to the federal government. To this day, it is not possible to drive the entire length of the island; one must travel on the mainland to journey between the National Seashore in Maryland and the National Wildlife Refuge in Virginia.

== Activities ==
Since the park's creation, several improvements have been made to aid the public in recreation. The park maintains a 2-mile (3 km) stretch of road on the island that travels through the state park in order for visitors to reach the National Seashore. A new visitor center was built in 2010 which is located on the mainland before visitors cross over the bridge to get to the island. The visitor center provides orientation information and exhibits for the public. Many ranger-led programs are available in the summer and fall. The park service also opened a new visitor contact station for campground operations, passes and permits on the island in 2012. The building is powered by new solar panels built in the nearby North Beach parking lot.

=== Camping ===
The park service maintains 148 campsites for both tents and recreational vehicles. On the Maryland side, campers have the option of an oceanside campsite on the west side of the main dune, or a bayside campsite on a peninsula projecting into Sinepuxent Bay. While the oceanside campsites have quick access to the beach and ocean, the bayside campsites offer better views of the wetlands, often with horses grazing there throughout the day. The park also offers six backcountry camping sites, four located on the bayside which can be accessed by canoe, kayak, or hiking, and two hike-in oceanside sites. No fresh water is available at any of the backcountry sites. The bayside sites see high populations of biting insects in summer. No camping is available on the Virginia portion of the island; however, there are several surrounding campgrounds in the town of Chincoteague and on the mainland.

Except for the backcountry sites, reservations must be made for all campsites. Reservations are opened six months ahead of time and often book quickly, especially for weekends and holidays.

=== Hiking ===
The national seashore has three short nature trails, each of which are under a mile long.

The marsh trail is a half-mile trail on an elevated boardwalk over the marsh. Its elevation provides relief from mosquitoes and other bugs, and it provides excellent views of the salt marsh habitat.

The forest trail is also a half-mile long, consisting of easily walkable hard pack surface and boardwalk. Much of the trail is shaded by woodlands providing relief from the heat.

The dunes trail is three-quarters of a mile long, walked entirely in the sand. The trail offers a look at many of the different plants that can be found in this habitat, as well as a section of Baltimore Boulevard, a road that existed on the island before it was destroyed in the 1962 storm.

=== Swimming ===
While visitors can swim anywhere in the ocean, the National Park Service provides a lifeguarded beach in both MD and VA. During the summer, lifeguards are on duty between 10 a.m. and 5 p.m. The national seashore is also a popular destination for surfers, however, surfing is prohibited within the lifeguarded area.

=== Fishing ===
Saltwater fishing is a very popular activity at the national seashore. Anglers age 16 and older must possess a valid fishing license when fishing in Maryland or Virginia. Starting in 2011, all anglers must purchase a valid Maryland fishing license before going out.

=== Over-Sand Vehicle Zone ===
The over-sand vehicle (OSV) zone is designated for four-wheel drive vehicles to drive on the beach. The Maryland OSV zone extends from the main camping area in the park to the Virginia state line where the horse fence prevents access into the national refuge. A permit and a verified list of safety equipment is required for access to the OSV zone. OSV access is limited to 145 vehicles at any time in Maryland, enforced by automatic gates, and 48 in Virginia, unless the Tom's Cove Hook is closed, in which case access is limited to 18 vehicles. OSV permits are issued for a year from the month of purchase. The permit fee ranges from $110 to $200, depending upon the type of access desired. All vehicles using the OSV zone must display a valid OSV Permit. Upon signing the registration for the OSV permit, operators accept responsibility for knowing and following all OSV regulations.

== Ecology ==
The national seashore provides habitat for a variety of plants and animals adapted to the coastline environment. The coastal salt marsh environment attracts wading birds, seabirds and mammals, as well as animals that have adapted to the harsh environment.

=== Birds ===
Shorebirds and wading birds are abundant at Assateague. Breeding birds include piping plovers, great egrets and red-winged blackbirds. Seabirds include brown pelicans and several species of gulls and terns. Wooded habitats shelter ruby-crowned kinglets and white-eyed vireos. During the winter the area shelters northern birds, including brant geese and northern saw-whet owls.

As a National Seashore, Assateague Island is required by federal law to protect species listed under the endangered species act. Piping plovers, listed federally as a threatened species, fall under this category and are therefore protected on the island. During their summer breeding period, closures of the OSV zone and north end of the island often occur in order to prevent visitors from disturbing their nests or harming the newborn chicks.

=== Horses ===
Bands of feral horses, commonly known as Chincoteague ponies or as Assateague horses, freely roam on Assateague Island. Although local legend claims that the horses are descendants of animals that survived a shipwreck on the coast, it is more likely that the horses are descendants of domestic horses confined on the island by local residents in lieu of fencing them in on the mainland, where fences were taxed. The salty low-nutrient diet of saltmarsh grasses has resulted in the horses' short stature and bloated abdomens.

Horses at Assateague Island National Seashore in August 2015

Two herds are kept separate by a fence at the Maryland-Virginia border. The horses in Virginia are owned by the Chincoteague Fire Department. These are the famous ponies that are herded every July and then swim to nearby Chincoteague Island as a fundraiser called "Pony Penning". In order to ensure healthy ponies to auction off, the firefighters provide them with food, water, and vet care. The Maryland herd is treated as wildlife and are not rounded up or removed from the island, nor do they receive veterinary care. The National Park Service uses birth control to manage the herd size, injecting a vaccine known as PZP via a dart to control pregnancy and to keep the size of the herd within 80–100 horses.

Though many of the horses on the island measure under 14 hands (4 ft 8 inches) in height, which would normally qualify them as ponies, most of their stock comes from horse breeds. Thus, despite their stunted height, which is attributed to their salty diet, they are considered horses and not ponies.

Though the horses, especially those in the developed area, may appear tame, they have been known to bite and kick park visitors. Visitors should be wary of the horses as they are feral animals and can cause serious harm to visitors who are too close to them. Additionally, rangers may write citations for visitors who are seen petting, feeding, or simply moving within 40 feet of the horses.

== Fees and passes ==
Fees to enter Assateague Island National Seashore are charged per motor vehicle, and are reciprocal with passes from Chincoteague National Wildlife Refuge in Virginia. Additionally, all forms of Federal Recreational Lands passes, including golden age, military, and access passes are accepted as long as the passholder is present in the vehicle. A full fee schedule can be found online.

== Gallery ==
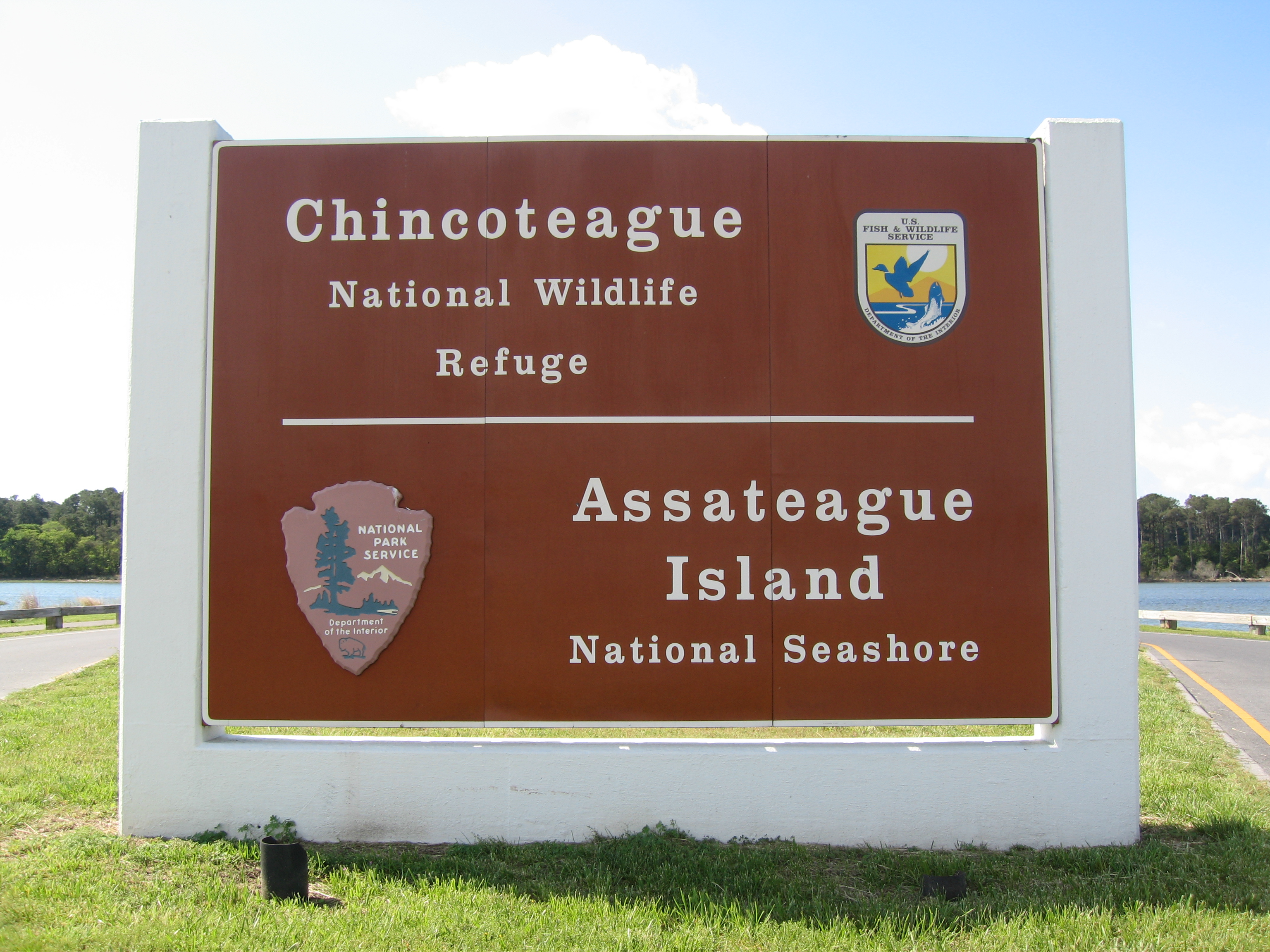
Sign at entrance from Chincoteague

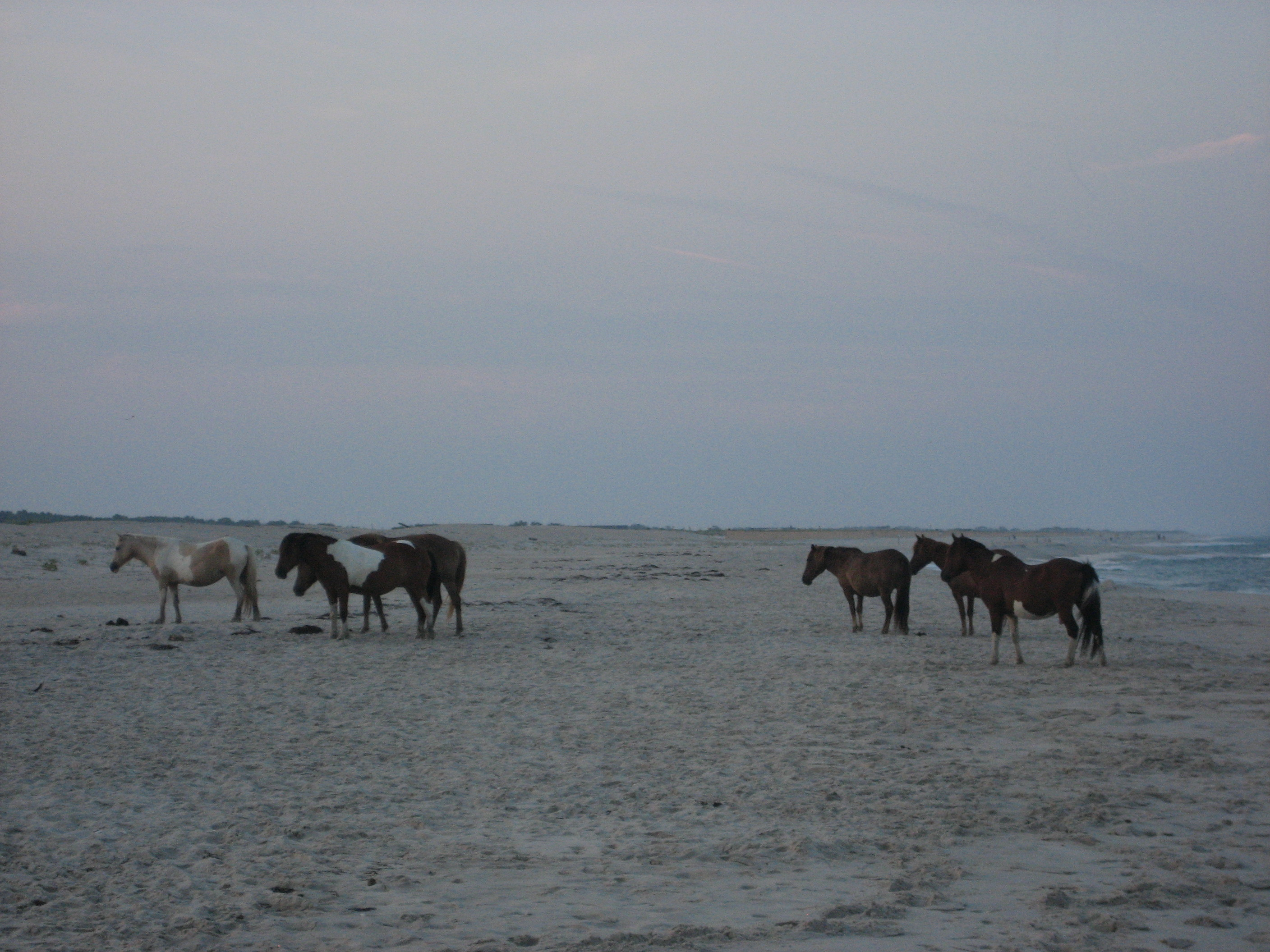
Wild horses on the beach

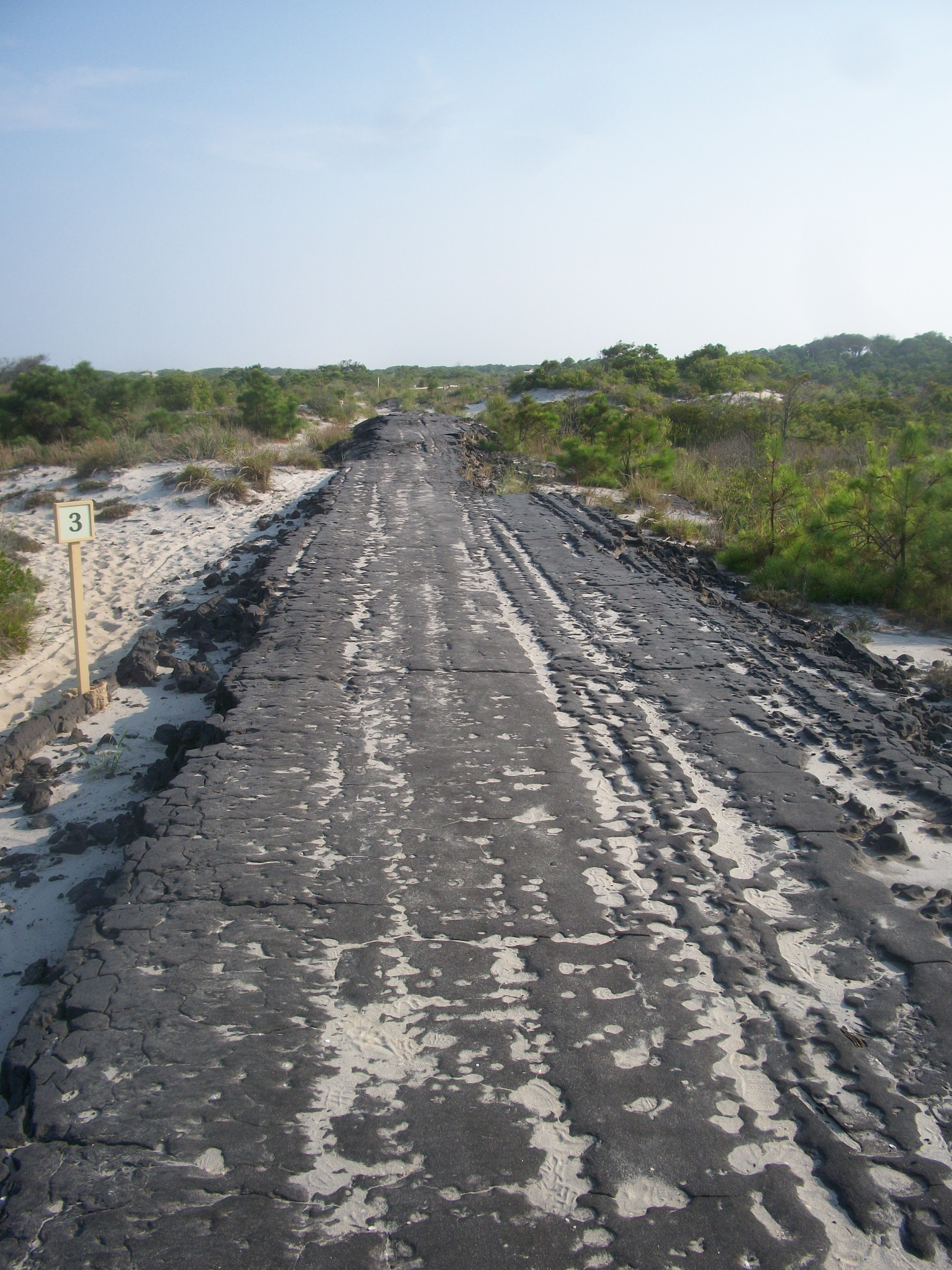
Baltimore Boulevard, designed as the main street of a planned sea resort; road and early construction were washed away in a 1962 storm, and the area soon after became protected by the federal government.
