= Watson =

Watson may refer to:

== People ==
- Watson (surname)
- Watson (given name)

== Computing and technology ==
- Watson (computer), an IBM supercomputer which won the game show Jeopardy!
- Watsonx, an AI platform of IBM
- Dr. Watson (debugger), the internal debugger for the Windows platform
- Intellext Watson, an application for the Windows platform
- Karelia Watson, an application for the Macintosh platform
- WATSON (Wide Angle Topographic Sensor for Operations and Engineering), a component of the Mars 2020 SHERLOC spectrometer

== Companies ==
- A. J. Watson, IndyCar roadster chassis constructor
- AS Watson, retail division of Hutchison Whampoa
  - Watsons, a health and beauty care retail chain in Asia and Europe
  - Watsons Water, a bottled water company in Hong Kong
  - Watson's Wine, a wine retailer in Hong Kong
- Thomas J. Watson Research Center, IBM research center
- Watson Pharmaceuticals, now Actavis, an Ireland- and U.S.-based pharmaceutical company
- Watson Systems, a Swiss maker of shopping trolleys
- Watson's (United States), a defunct department store chain based in Knoxville, Tennessee

== Places ==
Antarctica

- Watson Peninsula, South Orkney Islands

Australia

- Watson, Australian Capital Territory
  - Division of Watson, an electoral district of the Australian House of Representatives
- Watson, South Australia, a stop on the Trans-Australian Railway
- Watson Island (Queensland), an island in Howick Group National Park, Queensland, Australia

Canada

- Watson, Saskatchewan
- Watson Island (British Columbia), an island in the Queen Charlotte Strait in British Columbia, Canada
- Watson Lake, Yukon

United States

- Watson, Alabama
- Watson, Arkansas
- Watson Island, a neighborhood in Miami, Florida
- Watson, Illinois
- Watson, Indiana
- Watson, Iowa
- Watson, Louisiana
- Watson, Minnesota
- Watson, Missouri
- Watson, New York
- Watson, Ohio
- Watson, Oklahoma
- Watson, Virginia
- Watson, West Virginia
- Watson House (Chincoteague Island, Virginia)
- Watson Township (disambiguation)

== Other ==
- Watson (musician), an American singer and songwriter
- Clan Watson, a Scottish clan
- Jeannette K. Watson Fellowship, internship grant
- Thomas J. Watson Fellowship, travel grant
- The Watson Twins, an indie country-rock group
- George Watson's College, a school in Edinburgh, Scotland
- USS Watson, a proposed United States Navy destroyer canceled in 1946
- Watson (crater), a lunar impact crater on the far side of the Moon
- Watson (film), a 2019 documentary film
- Watson (newspaper), a Swiss online newspaper
- Watson (TV series), an American TV series

== See also ==
- Justice Watson (disambiguation)
