= Assateague Channel =

Coordinates: 37°55′35″N 75°20′30″W

Assateague Channel is a channel on the Eastern Shore of Virginia between Chincoteague Island and Assateague Island. The Assateague Channel connects to Assateague Bay to the northeast and Chincoteague Inlet to the southwest.

== Annual Pony Swim ==
On the last Wednesday in July, the Chincoteague Volunteer Fire Department conducts the annual Wild Pony Swim as part of Pony Penning. Salt Water Cowboys round up wild Chincoteague Ponies from Assateague Island and drive them across the Assateague Channel to Veteran's Memorial Park on Chincoteague Island. Once on Chincoteague Island, the Salt Water Cowboys herd the ponies to pens on the Chincoteague Carnival Grounds where some of the foals are auctioned off the next day. This traditional event in its current form has taken place since 1925 to raise money for the Chincoteague Volunteer Fire Department, but its roots date back to the 17th century.

== See also ==
- Assateague Light
