= Watson Township =

Watson Township may refer to the following places:

In Canada

- Watson Township, Cochrane District, Ontario

In the United States

- Watson Township, Effingham County, Illinois
- Watson Township, Allegan County, Michigan
- Watson Township, North Dakota
- Watson Township, Lycoming County, Pennsylvania
- Watson Township, Warren County, Pennsylvania

See also

- Watson (disambiguation)
