= Watson House (Chincoteague Island, Virginia) =

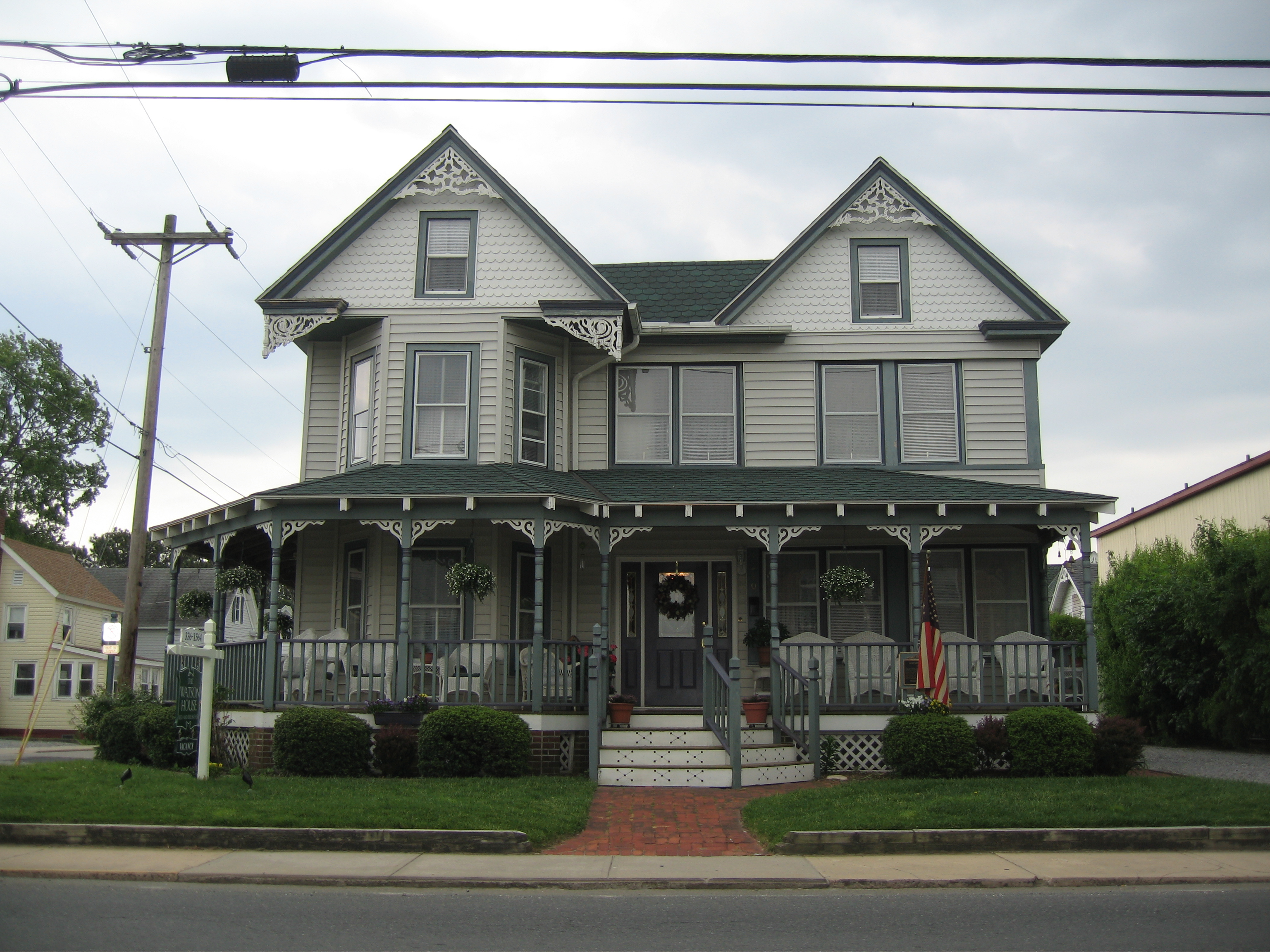
- Interactive map of the Watson House area

General information
- Type: Wood
- Location: 2240 Main Street; Chincoteague, Virginia
- Coordinates: 37.93628°N 75.37189°W
- Construction started: 1898

The Watson House is a historic U.S. home located at 4240 Main Street, Chincoteague, Virginia. The house represents a notable example of the Chincoteague architectural style. The Watson family lived in Chincoteague for many generations and Robert Watson and his son David Robert Watson built this house in 1898. The Watson family co-founded the first organized Pony Penning event in 1925 on Chincoteague. The house currently serves as bed and breakfast.
