= Proactive information delivery =

In information systems, proactive information delivery (PID) is a paradigm of supporting users in doing their work by delivering them information related to the current working situation. Unlike information search process where the user has to initiate the search, PID tries to identify the user's current information need.

== Applications of PID ==
PID can be used for Just-In-Time learning embedded in working processes.

== Examples of systems providing PID features ==
Intellext Watson was a prominent tool illustrating the concept of lightweight PID.

== Classification of PID methods ==
Classification of PID tools is given in
