= Intellext Watson =

Watson is a software program for Microsoft Windows released by Intellext in 2005, which reads what the user is working on and uses pattern recognition to proactively find relevant documents for the user. It demonstrates a lightweight approach to context-specific proactive information delivery.

In 2006, the company announced that MIVA, a performance marketing network, is to "display targeted Pay-Per-Click and Pay-Per-Call Ads offered by MIVA to Watson users."

Some years later the company Intelltext was bought by MediaRiver that used the Watson engine in their product ClickSurge. Watson is no longer supported.
