= Little Mosquito Creek =

Stream in Pottawattamie County, Iowa, U.S.

Coordinates: 41.2616647°N 95.8063995°W

Little Mosquito Creek is a stream in Pottawattamie County, Iowa, in the United States. It is a tributary of Mosquito Creek, from which it took its name.

== See also ==
- List of rivers of Iowa
