= Watson (given name) =

Watson is a patronymic forename of English and Scottish origin. Meaning "Son of Walter" or "Son of Water", the name originated in Old English because in medieval times the usual pronunciation of Walter was Water. Notable people with the name include:

- Watson Boas (born 1994), Papua New Guinean rugby league footballer
- Watson Cheyne (1852–1932), Scottish surgeon and bacteriologist
- Watson B. Dickerman (1846–1923), American banker
- Watson Forbes (1909–1997), Scottish violinist and classical music arranger
- Watson Fothergill (1841–1928), English architect
- Watson Khupe (1962/1963–2022), Zimbabwean politician
- Watson Kirkconnell (1895–1977), Canadian scholar, university administrator and translator
- Watson Nyambek (born 1976), Malaysian sprinter
- Watson Parker (1924–2013), American historian, author and academic
- Watson Reid (1827–1891), Scottish Episcopalian priest
- Watson Spoelstra (1910–1999), American sportswriter
- Watson C. Squire (1838–1926), American Civil War veteran and politician
- Watson Washburn (1894–1973), American tennis player

== See also ==
- Watson (computer), an IBM supercomputer
