= Watson Systems =

Watson Systems AG, established in Switzerland, founded by media developer and investor Norbert Schulz, Hamburg, produces "talking" shopping carts. The company developed and produced a worldwide database- and Internet-based audio advertising system for supermarkets and shopping centres.
