= Pony Penning =

Annual pony swim and auction event in Virginia, US

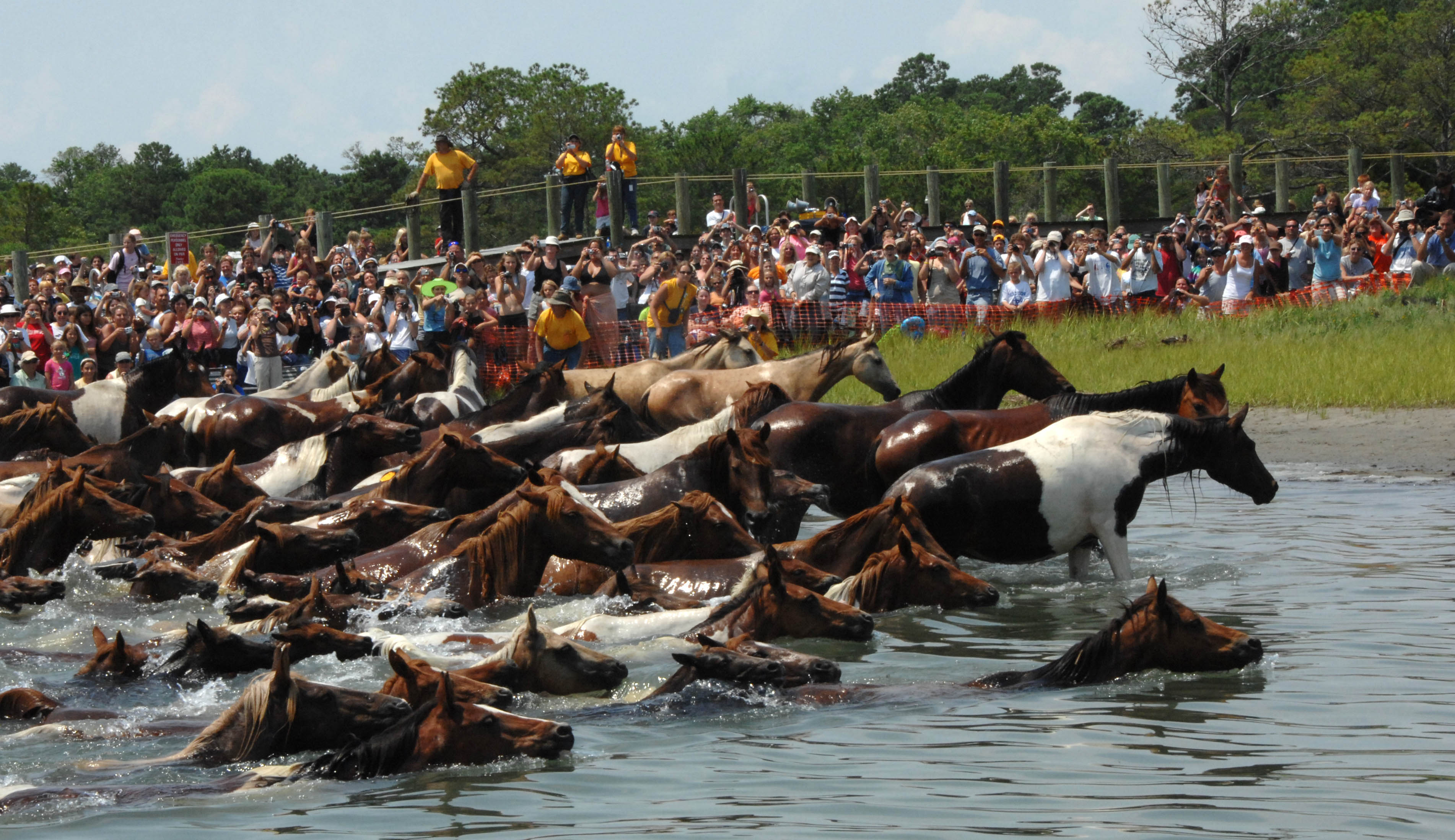
- Chincoteague ponies arriving on Chincoteague after swimming the channel
- Status: Active
- Genre: Auctions, carnivals
- Frequency: Annually, on the last consecutive Wednesday and Thursday in July
- Locations: Chincoteague Island, Virginia
- Country: United States
- Years active: 102
- Established: July 1924
- Attendance: 40,000–50,000
- Organiser: Chincoteague Volunteer Fire Department
- Sponsor: Chincoteague Chamber of Commerce
- Website: www.chincoteaguechamber.com/pony-penning/

Pony Penning, sometimes known as Pony Penning Days, Pony Penning Week, or Pony Swim, is an annual event held in Chincoteague, Virginia, on the last consecutive Wednesday and Thursday in July. The Chincoteague Fire Department conducts the event, which consists of a pony swim on Wednesday and a pony auction on Thursday for the main events, although events are started on the prior Saturday, and ended on the following Friday. For the pony swim, the Saltwater Cowboys round up feral Chincoteague ponies, which have been put in pens days earlier, from the Virginia side of Assateague Island and drive them across the Assateague Channel to Veterans Memorial Park on Chincoteague Island. The ponies swim across the channel during slack tide, when the water has minimal tidal movement (usually between 7:00 am and 1:00 pm). Once on Chincoteague Island, the Saltwater Cowboys herd the ponies to pens on the Chincoteague Carnival Grounds where all foals are auctioned off on Thursday, roughly ten or so being kept as "Buybacks", who will go back to Assateague Island the following spring.

== History and background ==
There are several theories about how the Chincoteague ponies came to exist on Assateague Island. The National Park Service, which controls the ponies on the Maryland side of Assateague, claims that the horses were brought to the island in the 17th century; however, leaders of the Chincoteague Volunteer Fire Company, which owns the ponies on the Virginia side of Assateague, claim that the horses are descended from Spanish horses who swam to the island from a shipwrecked Spanish galleon off the Virginia coast on their way to Peru in the 16th century. At some point after the ponies arrived on the island in the 16th or 17th century, pony penning began as a way for locals to claim, brand, and harness the wild herds.

=== Prior to 1924 ===
By the 1700s, the pony penning was an annual event and unclaimed animals were branded or marked for ownership by groups of settlers. The first written description of the pony penning appeared in 1835, and by 1885, the event had become a festival day. The event consisted of two days of horse and sheep roundups on Assateague and Chincoteague Islands. Over time, the sheep population diminished and the pony population grew and eventually sheep penning was halted. In 1909, the last Wednesday and Thursday of July were designated as the annual days for pony penning. The penning took place on both islands, until a wealthy farmer purchased a significant portion of Assateague Island, which forced many settlers to move to Chincoteague Island. This necessitated a change in the pony penning format, and by 1923, all parts of pony penning except for the actual roundup had moved to Chincoteague Island. The ponies were transported by truck for the first two years after the move, before the annual swim was begun in 1925.

=== 1924 to present ===
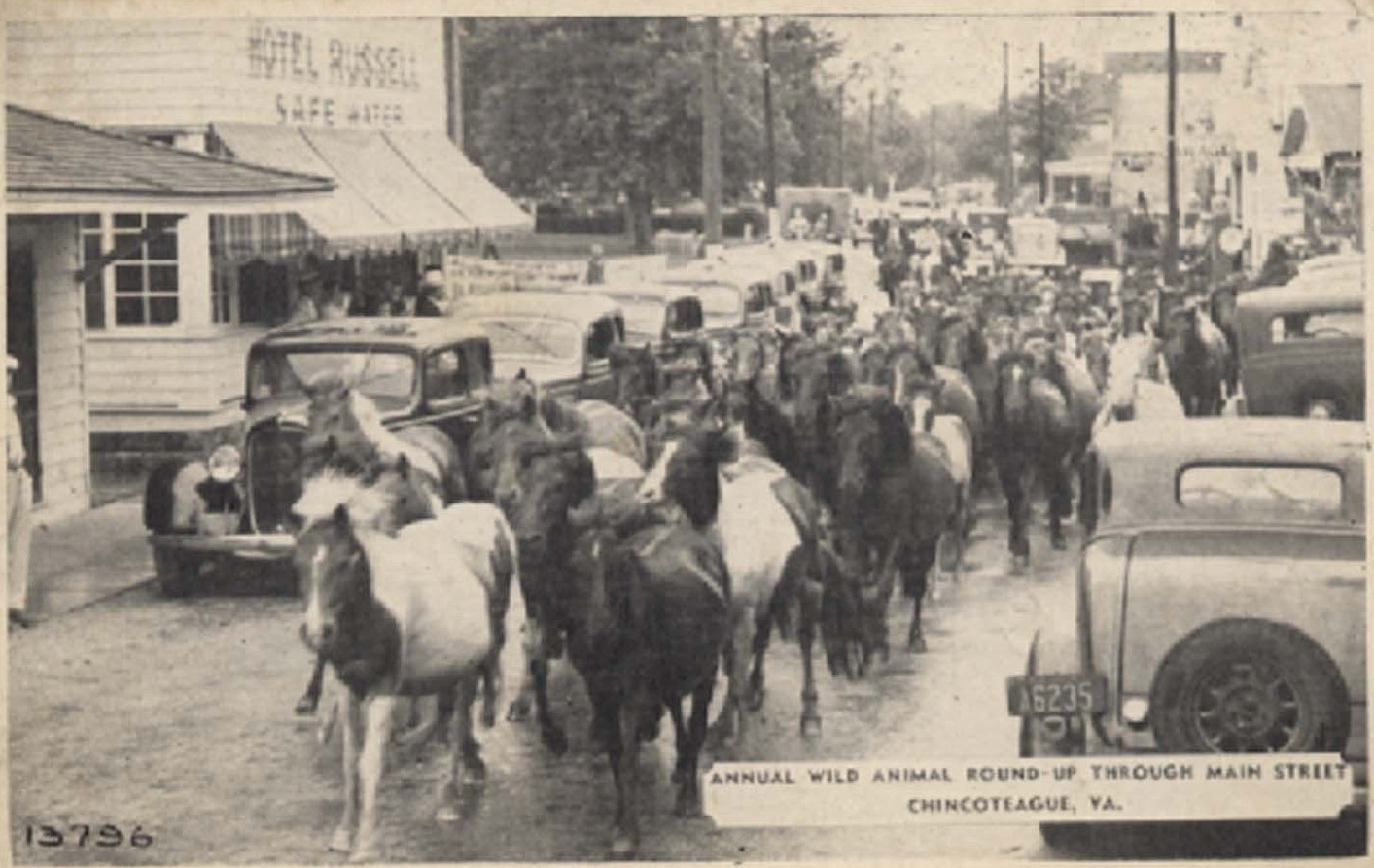

In 1922, a causeway was completed that connected the Chincoteague Island to the Virginia mainland. The Chincoteague Volunteer Fire Company was established in the same year, after a pair of fires ravaged the island. In 1924, the first official Pony Penning Day was held, where the foals were auctioned at $25–50 each to raise money for fire equipment. The fire department owns the herd, and holds a grazing permit from the U.S. Fish and Wildlife Service which allows the fire department to let the horses graze on the Virginia side of Assateague Island. The permit allows the fire department to maintain a herd of up to 150 horses. In 1927, the crowd of spectators was estimated to be approximately 25,000. The event was popularized by the book Misty of Chincoteague by Marguerite Henry, published in 1947. It now usually draws from 40,000 to 50,000 spectators.

Since 1924, Pony Penning Day has been an annual event, with the exception of 1942, 1943, 2020, and 2021. The event was cancelled during 1942 and 1943 due to World War II, and in 2020 and 2021, due to the COVID-19 pandemic. During the pandemic, the ponies were still rounded up, but were held on Assateague rather than making the swim to Chincoteague, and the foals were sold in an online auction rather than in the traditional live auction at the Chincoteague Carnival Grounds.

== Saltwater Cowboys ==
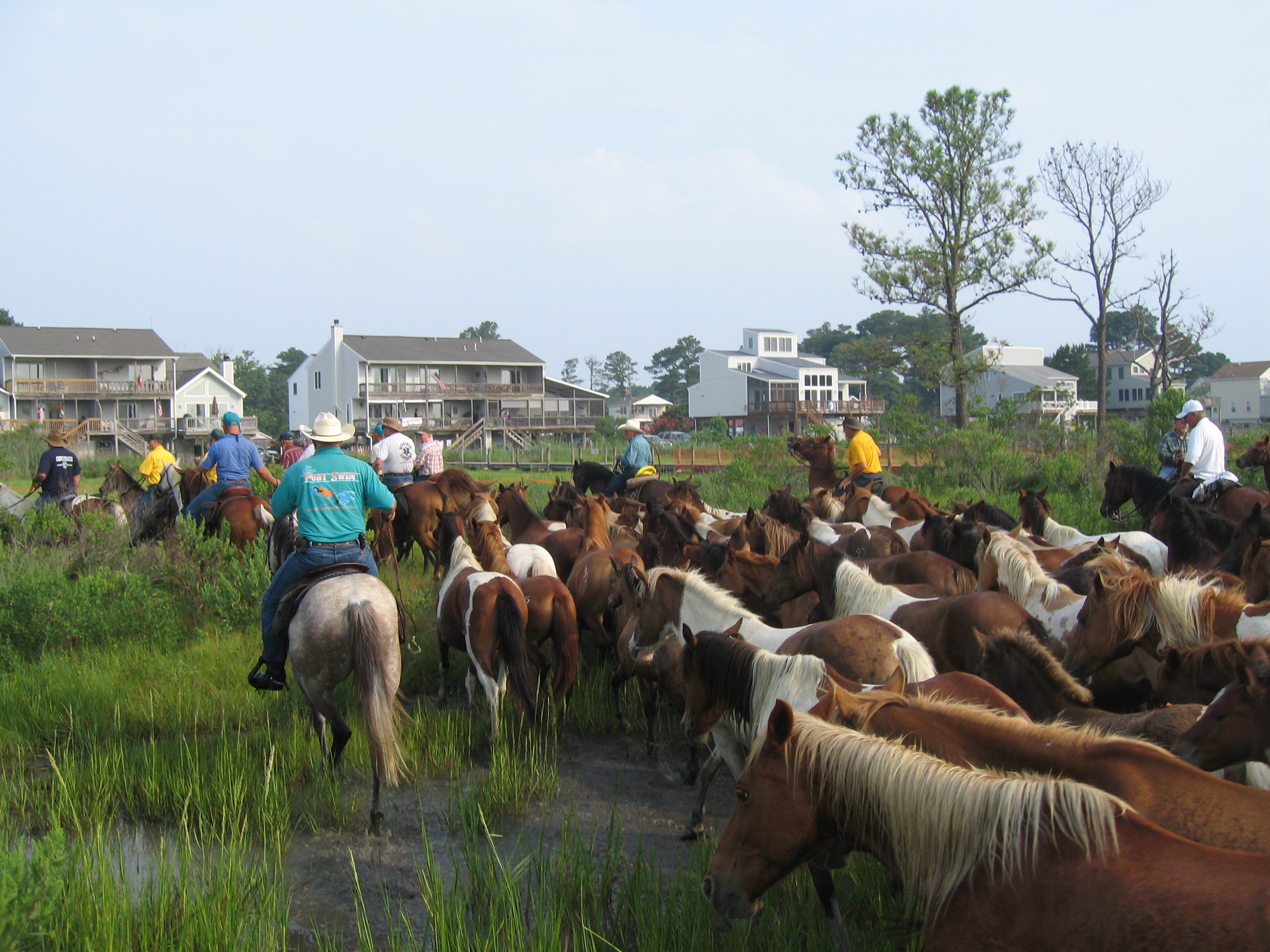
Saltwater cowboys driving ponies to Chincoteague Carnival Grounds

Members of the Chincoteague Volunteer Fire Department known as "Saltwater Cowboys" oversee the annual pony swim. In the early years of the swim, there were not enough riders on Chincoteague to help with the swim, so Saltwater Cowboys were recruited from the mainland. There are about 40-55 Saltwater Cowboys, many of whom have held the position for most of their lives. Positions as a Saltwater Cowboy are highly sought after, and receiving one is considered an honor. As of 2019, some of the cowboys were third generation. The oldest Saltwater Cowboy is Jack Brittingham, who was 93 years old in 2026.

The Saltwater Cowboys care for the wild ponies throughout the year, rounding up the ponies three times a year to vaccinate and perform check-ups on the horses. There are occasional round-ups in the off season if any horse or foal needs medical attention. Some of the proceeds from the annual pony auction are used to care for the ponies. During spring roundups, the Saltwater Cowboys also release buyback ponies from the previous year's auctions. In the winter of 2018, the Saltwater Cowboys had to euthanize seven ponies suffering from "swamp cancer," a fungal infection. After the loss of these ponies, three mares with ancestral roots on Assateague were donated to the Saltwater Cowboys in order to help maintain the herd population. There has since been leaps and bounds in the research of "swamp cancer", and many ponies have now been able to be treated for it and released back onto the island, or placed in the care of private owners if deemed not fit for feral life.

== Roundup and beach walk ==
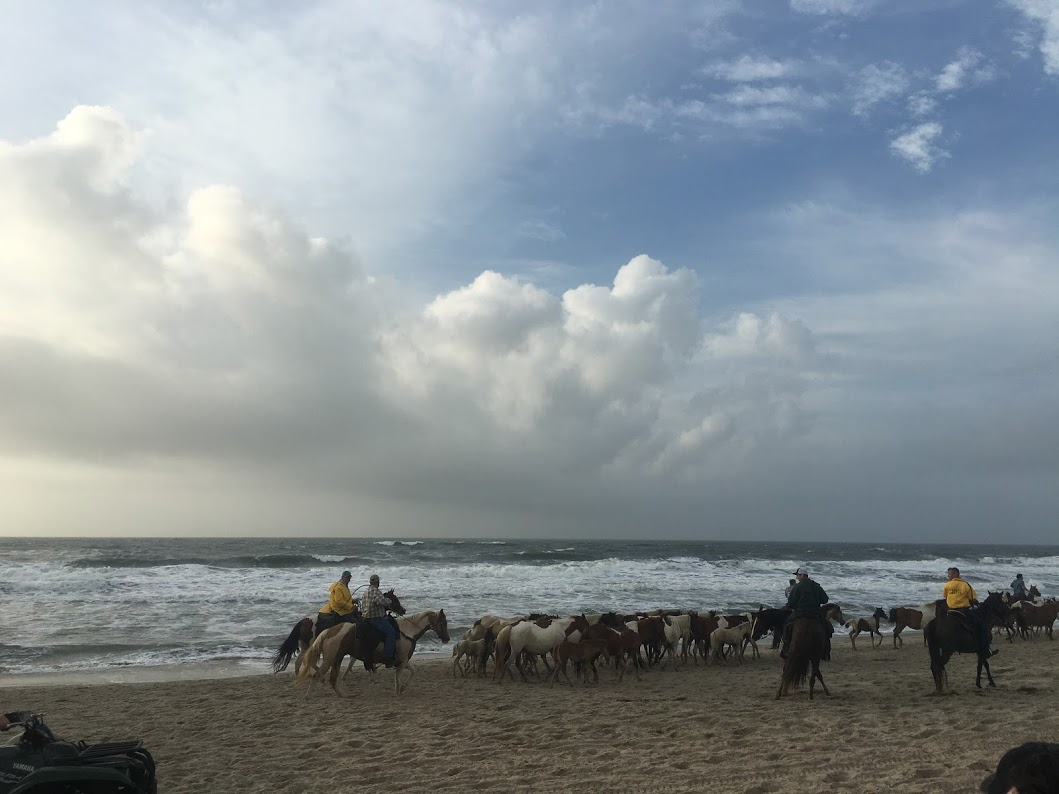
The Saltwater Cowboys drive the ponies down the beach on Assateague Island, prior to the pony swim

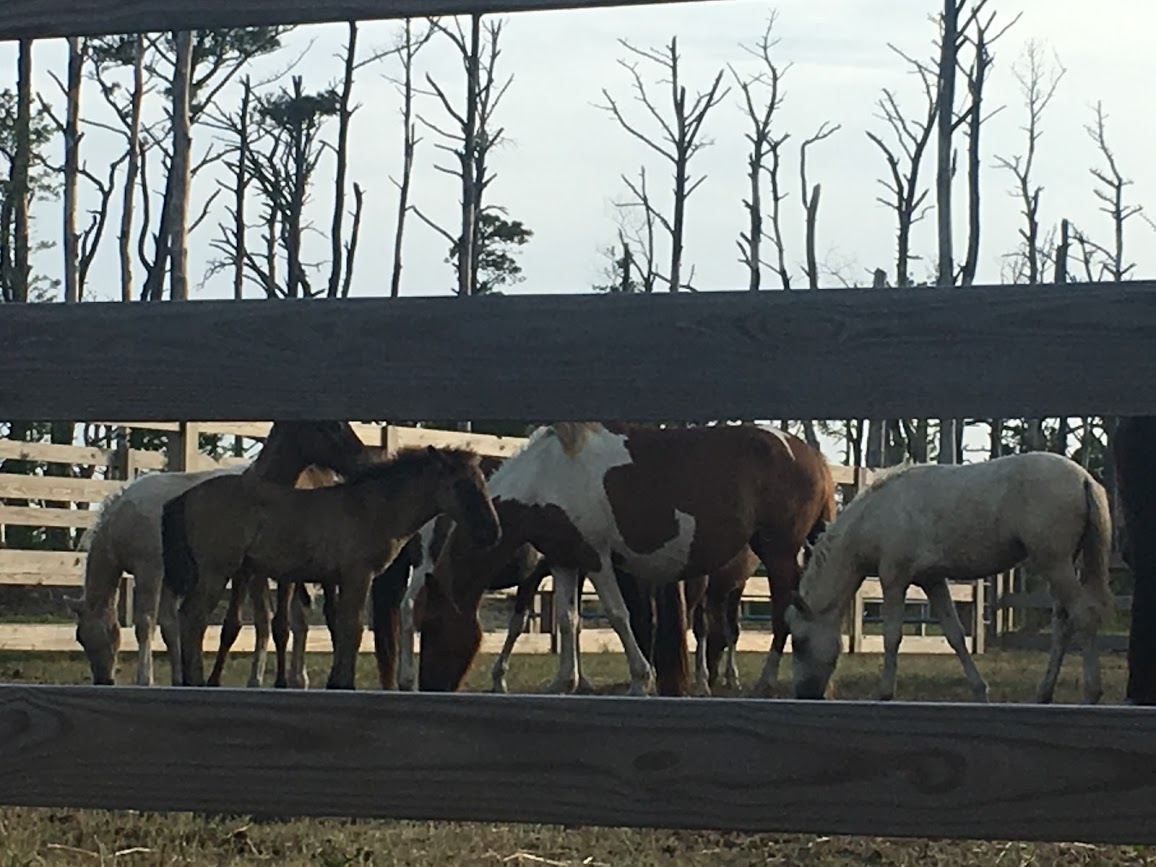
Chincoteague ponies in the Southern Corral, prior to the annual swim

Prior to the swim, the Saltwater Cowboys round up the north and south herds on the island and put them into corrals. On the Monday before the pony swim, the northern herd ponies leave the northern corral at daybreak and are walked approximately five miles along the shore of the Atlantic Ocean to join the ponies from the south herd at the southern corral, this event appropriately being called the Beach Walk. On the Tuesday before the swim, the herd is evaluated and mares in the late stages of pregnancy and those with very young foals are removed from the herd to be trailered between the islands. Ponies that are not healthy enough to make the swim are also trailered. During this time, the Saltwater Cowboys also select which foals will be "buyback" ponies, ponies designated and auctioned to return and replenish the herd.

== Pony Swim ==
Coast Guard ensuring the safety of the public during the 2014 swim

The pony swim occurs on Wednesday between 7 a.m. and 1 p.m., depending on slack tide. The exact time of the swim is announced the day before the swim. It lasts approximately three to five minutes. Approximately 40,000 people gather on the shores to watch the swim from Veterans Memorial Park or Pony Swim Lane. Usually, a television screen is located at Veterans Memorial Park so that those in the back of the crowd can still see the swim.

The Saltwater Cowboys accompany the ponies into the channel, and then volunteers in boats called "scowboys" assist any ponies, especially foals, who may have a hard time with the crossing. The first foal to reach the shore is named King or Queen Neptune, who will be later raffled off to anyone who purchased the winning "Neptune Ticket" at the Chincoteague Carnival Grounds the night after the swim.

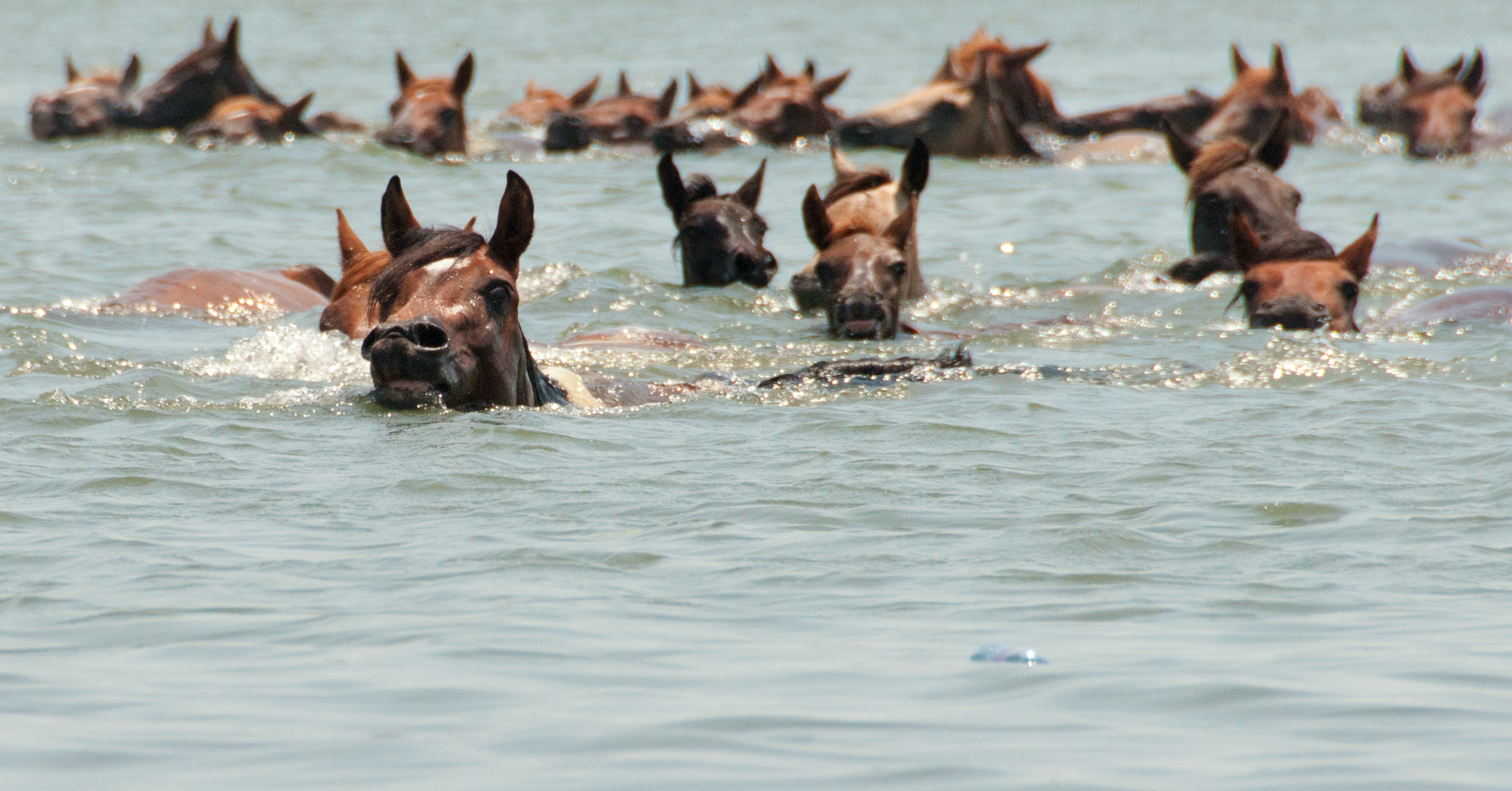
Ponies during the 2010 swim

During the swim, some lactating mares become affected with hypocalcemia, which is treated by on-site veterinarians. The ponies rest for a short period while they are examined by veterinarians and are then driven along Ridge Road on a parade route to the Volunteer Fire Department Fairgrounds by the Saltwater Cowboys. Many observers line the route, helping to keep the ponies on the road. At the fairgrounds, ponies are put into corrals and are again evaluated by veterinarians and potential bidders. All foals will be separated from their dams early the next morning and auctioned off the following day.

The majority of the ponies, including any mares with young foals, are returned to Assateague on Friday. The northern herd is trailered back by the Saltwater Cowboys, and the southern herd swims back. These ponies leave the fairgrounds in the morning and then swim back across the channel by noon, guided by the Saltwater Cowboys.

Its often brought up as a concern that a pony may drown, but there has never been a recorded account of a pony drowning at the swim.

== Volunteer Fireman's Carnival ==
The Volunteer Fireman's Carnival begins prior to the pony swim and continues after the swim into early August. After the swim, the ponies are driven by the Saltwater Cowboys to the carnival grounds, where they are corralled and can be observed by the Saltwater Cowboys and potential bidders. In 2018, a stallion named Surfer's Riptide was chasing a mare, Butterfly Kisses, when the mare slipped and slid into a fence. Butterfly Kisses broke her neck and unfortunately had to be euthanized. Following this event, animal rights group PETA called for future events to be cancelled. Volunteer fire department personnel responded to say that the death was a "freak accident" and that future events would not be cancelled. This is one of a few events that have caused a loss during pony penning week.

== Auction of foals ==
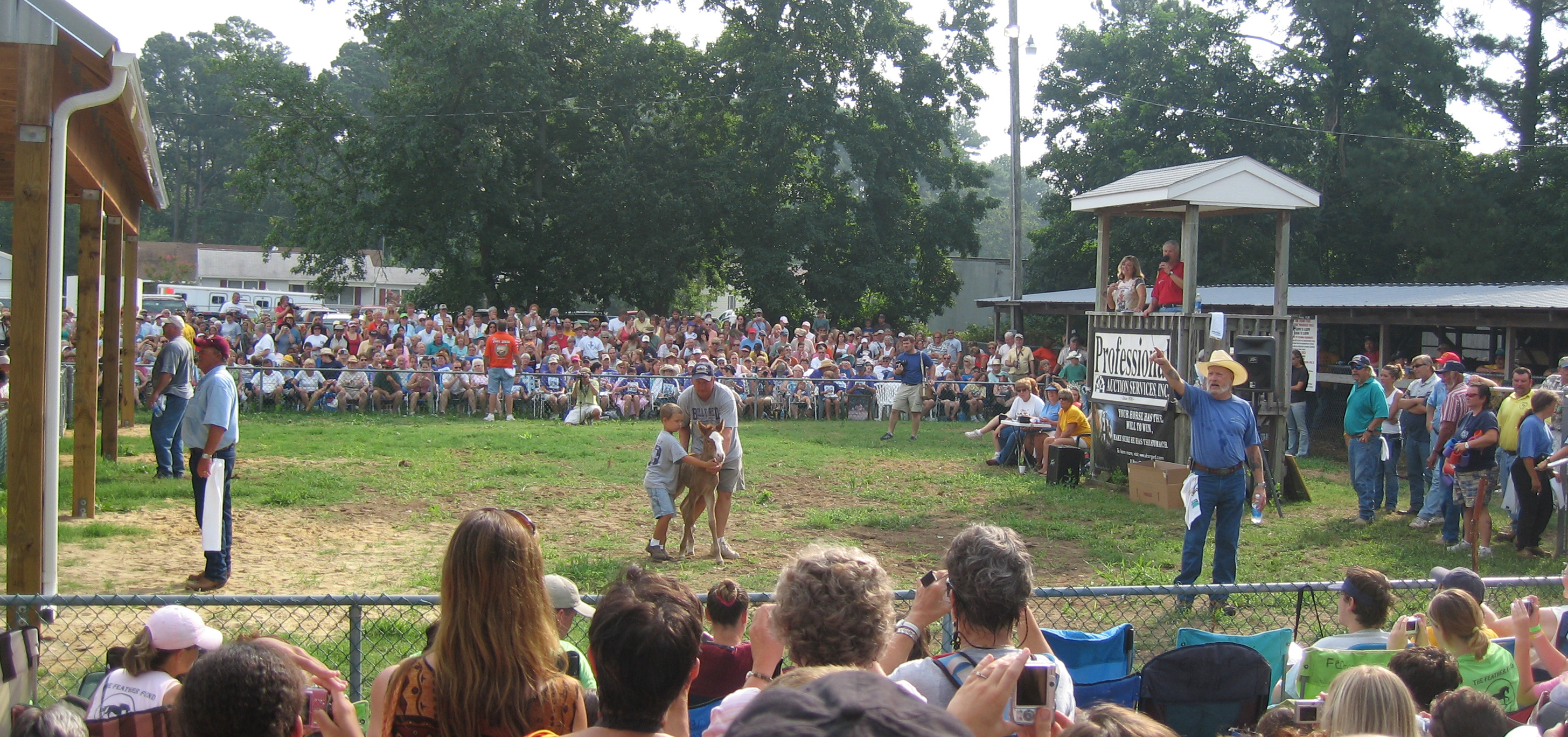
Pony Auction in 2008

The annual auction is a fundraiser for the Chincoteague Volunteer Fire Department and is also used to maintain the herd size. Since the permit granted to the fire department by the U.S. Fish and Wildlife Service allows them to graze a herd of up to 150 horses, the department uses the auction as a way of keeping the numbers within the limits of the permit since approximately seventy to one hundred foals are born each year. The auction is conducted by auctioneer Tim Jennings. On the Thursday following the swim, all foals are auctioned off at the Volunteer Fire Department fairgrounds. As of 2019, more than 1,297 ponies had been auctioned. Items such as photos and prints are also auctioned. Typically, the proceeds from one designated foal are donated to a local charity. Anyone who attends in the auction can participate and registration is not required. Transportation home for auctioned foals must be approved by the pony committee. Ponies are typically picked up by 5 p.m. on the Friday after the auction, but any foals born after May 30 must be picked up in the fall.

The Feather Fund is a charity which helps children to purchase ponies at the auction. The charity was created in 2003 in memory of Carollynn Suplee, who used to attend the auction to help children buy ponies until she died from cancer. The charity believes that raising a foal helps to teach children life lessons.

In 2020 and 2021, due to the COVID-19 pandemic and subsequent cancellation of the pony swim, the auction was held in an online event on SportHorseAuctions.com, which was owned by longtime Chincoteague auctioneer Tim Jennings. Photos of the to-be-auctioned foals were posted online along with relevant information about the foal. While usually a one-day event, the 2020 auction lasted a week.

After the online auction format was introduced in 2021 and also used exclusively in 2021, when the in person auction was brought back in 2022 the online format was adapted, with a hybrid auction format being used. This system has been in use since.

=== Buyback ponies ===
Several ponies each year are purchased under "buyback" conditions, where the bidder donates the money to the fire department but allows the pony to be released back onto Assateague Island in order to help maintain the population. The buyback donors are given naming rights to the pony. Buyback ponies usually receive the highest bids, the record as of 2025 being held by a buyback mare called "Marnie", who was sold to the Buyback Friends for a record of $100,000

=== Auction records ===
The average price paid for a pony has steadily increased over the years. Between 2016 and 2017, the average winning bids increased by 30 percent. In 2018, the average winning bid increased by 24 percent from the previous year. The highest ever recorded bid for an individual pony was $43,000 in 2023.

The 2020 auction, which was held online due to the COVID-19 pandemic, resulted in $388,000 of total sales, breaking the previous total sales record by more than $100,000. The records for highest bid and average cost per pony were also broken. Generally, the highest bid is for a buyback pony.

Year	Ponies sold	Average cost	High bid	Low bid	Total sales	Notes	Reference
1999	86	$1,620	$4,200	$800			
2000	84	$2,060	$7,500	$1,300	$173,085		
2001	85	$1,961	$10,500	$1000	$166,725		
2002	89	$1,818	$7,800	$950	$161,800		
2003	71	$1798.59	$6,600	$1,000	$127,700		
2004	74	$1618.24	$4000	$850	$119,750		
2005	66	$2255.30	$8000	$900	$148,850		
2006	78	$2150.64	$7500	$350	$167,750	Low bid was a 3-year-old pony	
2007	73	$2,442.47	$17,500	$700	$178,300	Average cost and high bid matched previous record; new total sales record	
2008	74	$1,413.85	$9,500	$400	$104,625		
2009	70	$1,344.29	$11,700	$500	$94,100		
2010	59	$1,310	$8,100	$375	$77,275		
2011	69	$1,442	$6,700	$450	$99,500		
2012	67	$1,436	$7,000	$400	$96,252		
2013	55	$2,000.00	$12,000	$650	$113,975		
2014	54	$2,772	$21,000	$700	$149,700	New record for average cost and high bid	
2015	61	$2,779.94	$25,000	$500	$169,576	New record for average cost and high bid	
2016	57	$2,659	$11,000	$550	$151,550		
2017	62	$3,386	$15,000	$1,100	$209,900		
2018	53	$4,310	$20,000	$1,000	$228,400		
2019	57	$4,767	$17,000	$1,400	$271,700	New record for average cost and total sales	
2020	68	$5,705	$28,250	$1,800	$388,000	Auction was held online due to COVID-19 pandemic. New record for average cost, high bid, and total sales.	
2021	75	$5,559	$25,500	$2,400	$416,950	New record for low bid and total sales	
2022	72	$7, 146	$32,000	$2,500	$450,200	New record for average cost, low bid, high bid, and total sales	
2023	72	$6,792	$43,000	$1,800	$489,000	New record for high bid and total sales	
2024	88(97 born)	$6,223	$50,000	$1,600	$547,700	New record for high bid and total sales	
2025	94(102 born)	$10,724	$100,000	$3,000	$1,008,100	New record for average cost, low bid, high bid, and total sales	

== See also ==
- Chincoteague National Wildlife Refuge
- Misty (1961 film)
