= Chincoteague Inlet =

Inlet on the coast of Virginia, U.S.

Coordinates: 37°53′4″N 75°24′43″W

Chincoteague Inlet is found lying between Assateague Island and Wallops Island on the Eastern Shore of Virginia. It is 30 miles south-southwestward from the Ocean City, Maryland Inlet.

The approach has no sea buoy, however lighted buoy (R "2"), marking Chincoteague Shoals, is located ESE of the entrance at 37°47’25" N / 075°22’21" W, and can be used.

Prominent on the approach are Assateague Light shown from a 142-foot red and white horizontally banded conical tower and a lookout tower on the southern tip of Assateague Island; both are visible well offshore.

The marked channel through the inlet to Chincoteague Channel is subject to frequent change; the buoys are shifted with changing conditions. Breakers are evident on either side of the channel. A sunken wreck is about 0.4 mile southwest of Fishing Point in 37°51’54" N., 75°24’04" W.

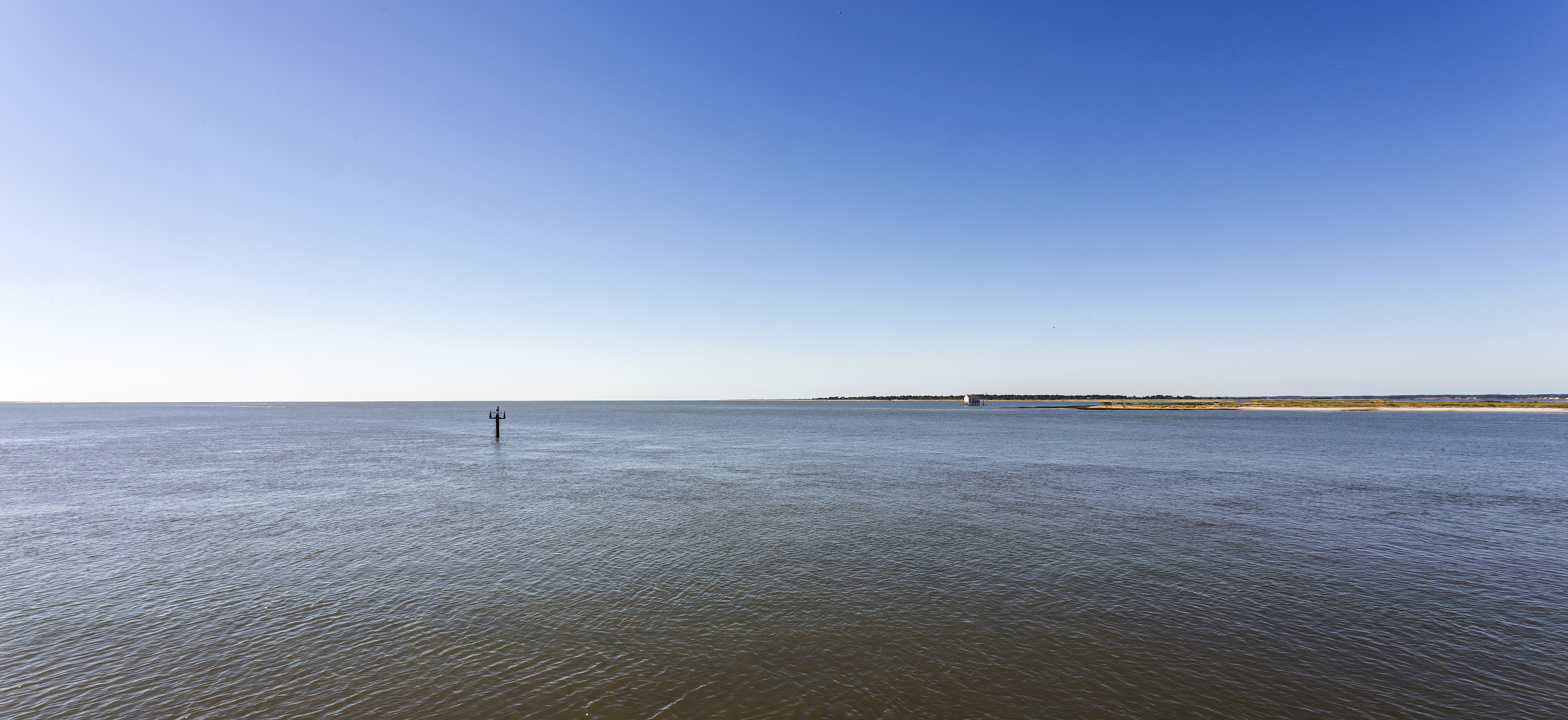
Chincoteague Inlet from Merritt Harbor Mariner's Memorial Park
