= Chincoteague Fire Department =

Coordinates: 37°55′59.2″N 75°22′41.8″W

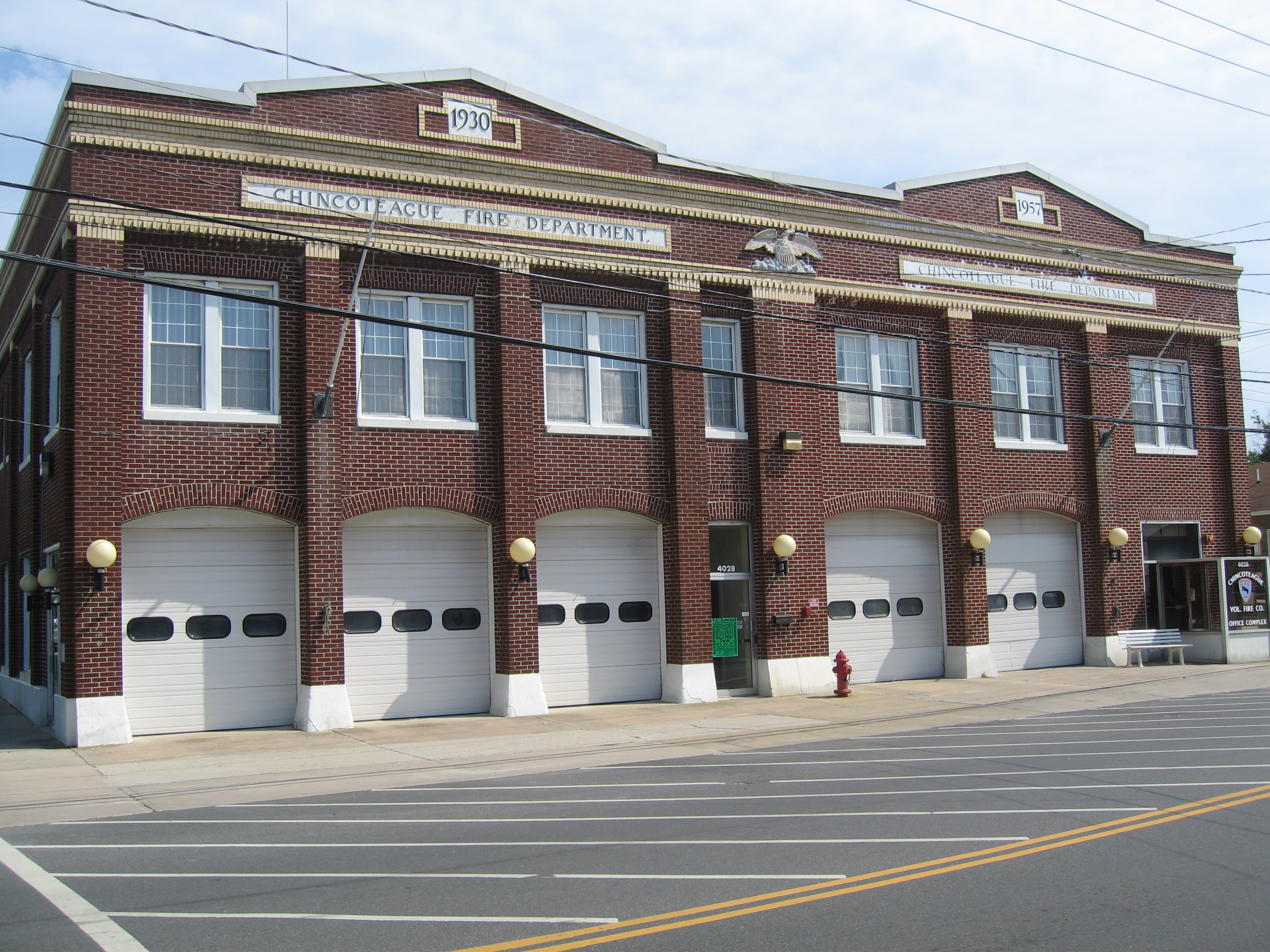
- Chincoteague Fire Department
- Interactive map of the Chincoteague Fire Department area

General information
- Location: 4026/4028 Main Street; Chincoteague Island, Virginia, United States
- Completed: 1988

The Chincoteague Fire Department is located at 4026/4028 Main Street, Chincoteague Island, Virginia. This building was initially constructed in 1930 and expanded in 2019.

The Chincoteague Volunteer Fire Company operates from this building with approximately 25 active and 85 life members with 4 pumper engines, 1 75-foot ladder, 1 rescue truck and 2 advanced life saving ambulances.

The Chincoteague Volunteer Fire Department owns the Virginia Herd of Chincoteague Ponies on the Virginia side of Assateague Island. It also conducts the annual Pony Penning to help raise money for the department. The other herd is the Maryland Herd on the Maryland side of Assateague Island, owned by the National Park Service.

On October 21, 2022, Virginia Governor Glenn Youngkin and First Lady Suzanne Youngkin presented the Spirit of Virginia Award to the Chincoteague Volunteer Fire Company.
