= List of Art Deco architecture in Virginia =

This is a list of buildings that are examples of the Art Deco architectural style in Virginia, United States.

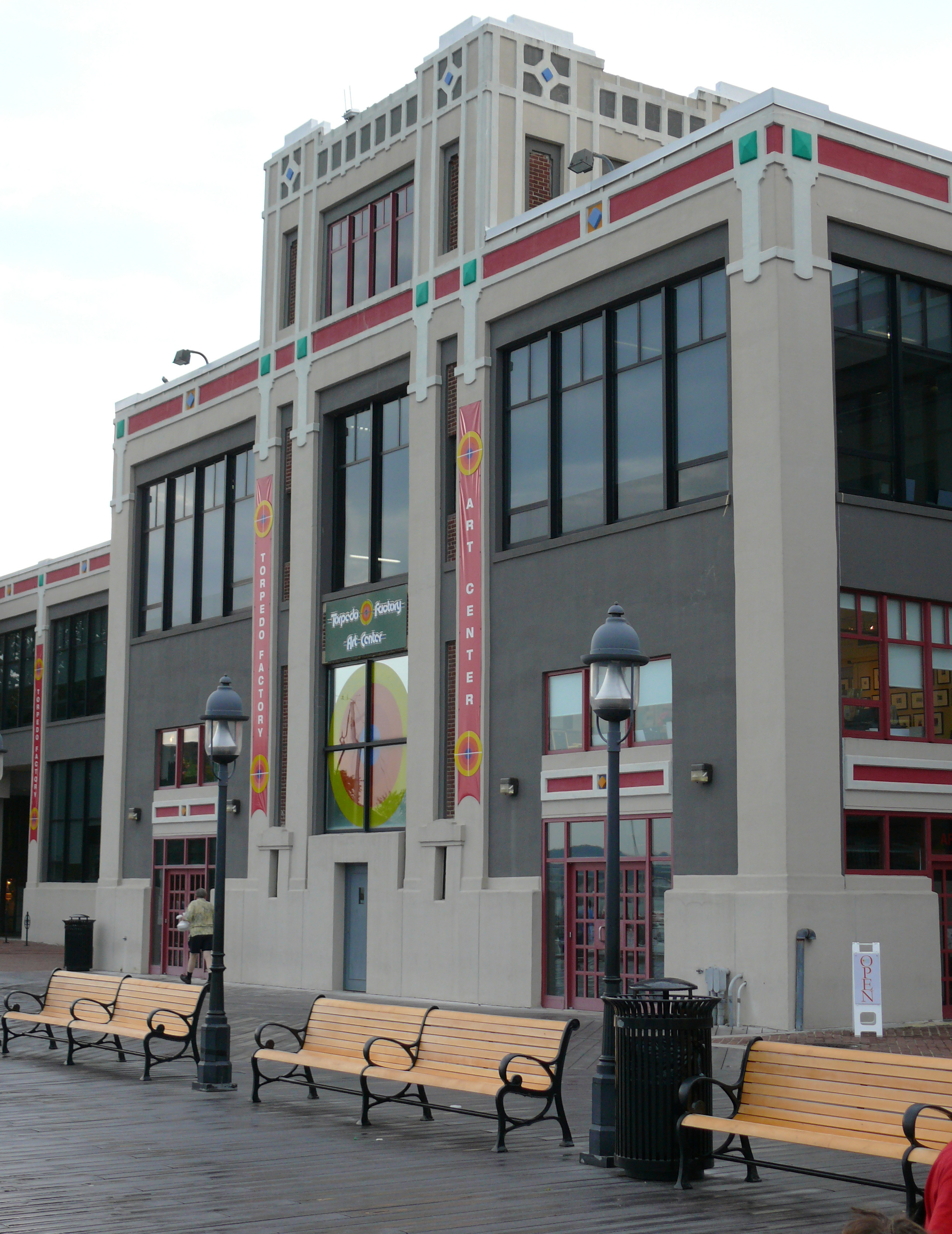
Torpedo Factory Arts Center, Alexandria

== Alexandria ==
- Arlandria Floors Building, Garage, Del Ray, Alexandria, 1941
- Bowman's Drugstore, Del Ray, Alexandria, 1941
- Chesapeake & Potomac Telephone Co. of Virginia Building, Del Ray, Alexandria, 1940 and 1947
- Del Ray Building, Del Ray, Alexandria, 1938
- George Washington Middle School, Del Ray, Alexandria, 1936
- Glendale Garden Apartments, Del Ray, Alexandria, 1937
- Leslie Avenue/Monroe Avenue Warehouses ( now Swing Coffee), Del Ray, Alexandria, 1952
- Palm Theatre and Guild Theatre, Del Ray, Alexandria, 1923, 1955
- Poladian Building, Del Ray, Alexandria, 1939, 1947
- Torpedo Factory Art Center, Old Town, Alexandria, 1918 and 1930s
- Walgreens Building, Del Ray, Alexandria, 1941

== Arlington County ==
- Arlington Cinema 'N' Drafthouse, Arlington Country, 1939
- Calvert Manor, Arlington Country, 1948
- Cherrydale Auto Parts (former Progressive Cleaners), Arlington Country, 1939
- Glebe Center, Arlington Country, 1940
- Lee Garden Apartments, Arlington Country
- Wakefield Manor, Arlington Country, 1943
- Washington-Liberty High School addition, Arlington Country, 1938

== Blacksburg ==
- Blacksburg Motor Company, Inc., Blacksburg, 1923 and 1933
- Lyric Theatre, Blacksburg, 1930
- National Bank of Blacksburg, Blacksburg, 1941

== Lynchburg ==
- Allied Arts Building, Lynchburg, 1931
- Armstrong Elementary School, Lynchburg, 1954
- Lynchburg News & Daily Advance Building, Lynchburg, 1931
- Pyramid Motors, Lynchburg, 1937

== Norfolk ==
- Ocean View Elementary School, Norfolk, 1939
- Walter E. Hoffman United States Courthouse, Norfolk, 1932
- York Center, Norfolk, 1924

== Portsmouth ==
- Commodore Theatre, Portsmouth, 1945
- Governor Dinwiddie Hotel and Suites, Portsmouth, 1945
- National Guard Armory, Portsmouth, 1936

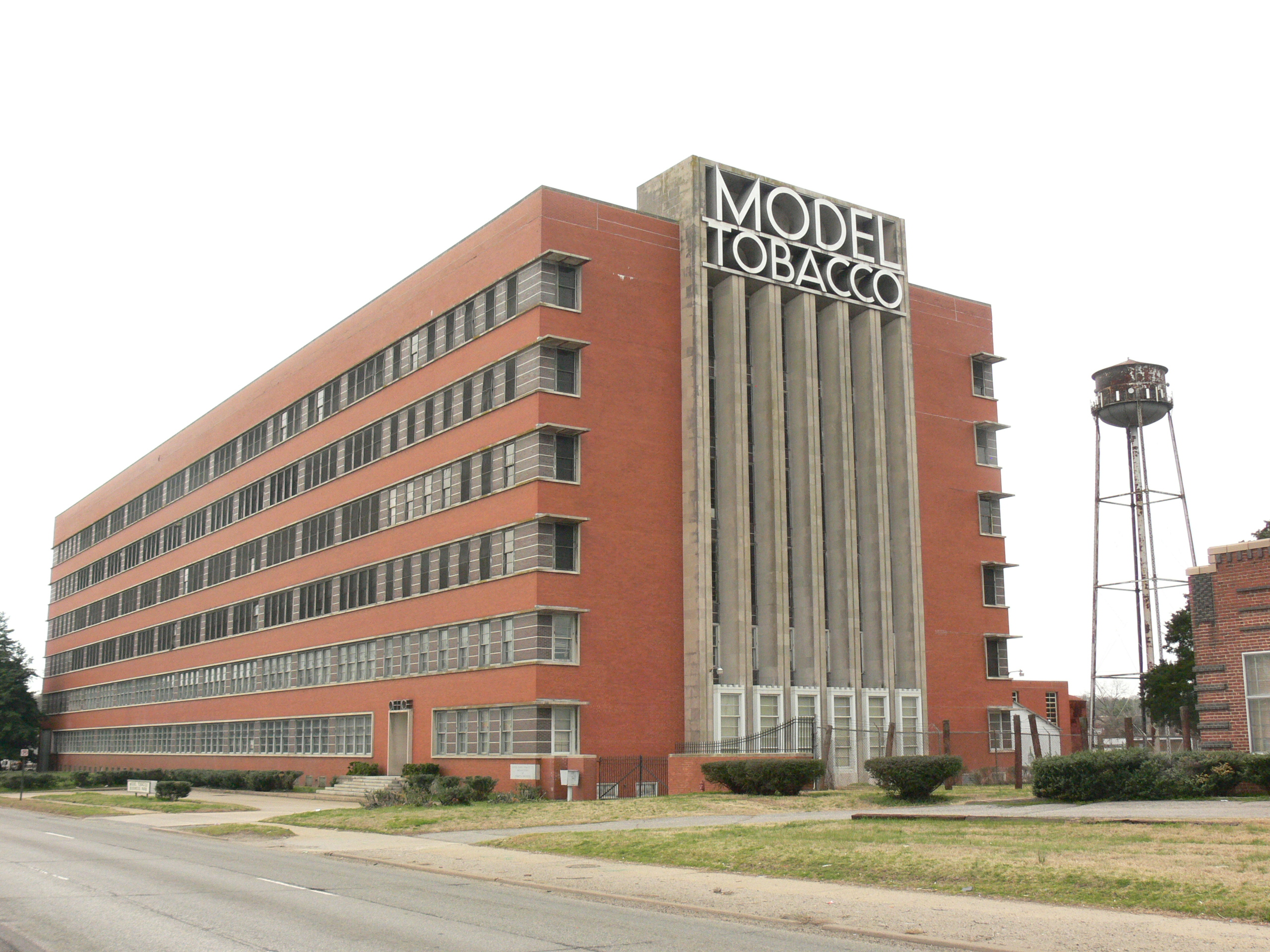
Model Tobacco Building, Richmond

== Richmond ==
- 3500 Center (Seaboard Airline Railroad Co), Scott's Addition, 1956
- 718 East Franklin Street, Richmond, 1951
- A&P Building (Scott's Addition Animal Hospital), 1938
- Altamont Apartments, Scott's Addition, 1929
- Auto Repair Garage, Scott's Addition, 1941
- Bank of Virginia (Comedy Club), Grace Street, 1949
- Bausch & Lombe, Richmond, 1940
- Blanchard's Coffee, Scott's Addition, 1930s
- Cary Street Park and Shop Center, Richmond, 1938
- Central National Bank Richmond, 1929
- C. P. Dean (Mosaic Catering), Scott's Addition, 1930
- Chesapeake & Potomac Telephone Company (Verizon Building), 1929
- Commercial Building, Scott's Addition, 1932
- Commercial Buildings, Grace Street, 1932
- Curles Neck Dairy Sales & Distribution, Scott's Addition, 1939 (Bernie Sanders mural)
- Dooley wing lobby, Richmond Public Library, 1930
- East End Theatre, Church Hill North, 1936-1938
- Franklin Federal Savings and Loan Company (Capitol Thrift), 1940
- General Outdoor Advertising Richmond Branch (1930)
- Hand Craft Services, Scott's Addition, 1946
- Havens & Martins Inc. Radio/WMBG (WTVRCBS6), Scott's Addition, 1938
- The Hippodrome, Richmond, 1946
- Investment Realty Company (Perly's), Grace Street, 1930
- Lewis F. Powell Jr. United States Courthouse Annex (former Parcel Post Building), Richmond, 1929
- Maggie Walker High School, Richmond,1936
- Miller and Rhoads (Hilton), Richmond, 1930 update
- Model Office Park, Richmond, 1939
- Model Tobacco Building, Richmond, 1940
- Moving and Storage Transport Station (Ardent), Scott's Addition, 1940s
- Nolde Brothers Bakery, Richmond, 1926
- O. P. Brisner store, 208 East Grace Street, Richmond, 1930
- P. C. Abbott Store (Silk Trading), Richmond, 1930
- R. McGuire Steinruck Used Car Showroom, Scott's Addition, 1951
- Richmond Storage and Service Garage, 1928
- Robinson Theatre, Richmond, 1937
- Syndlor and Hundley Building, Grace Street, 1931
- Thomas Jefferson High School, Richmond, 1929
- Verizon Building Annex, Richmond, 1949
- Virginia State Library (Patrick Henry Building), 1938
- W. J. Anderson, Richmond, 1929
- W. T. Grant (Subway), Richmond, 1939
- West Hospital, Richmond, 1940

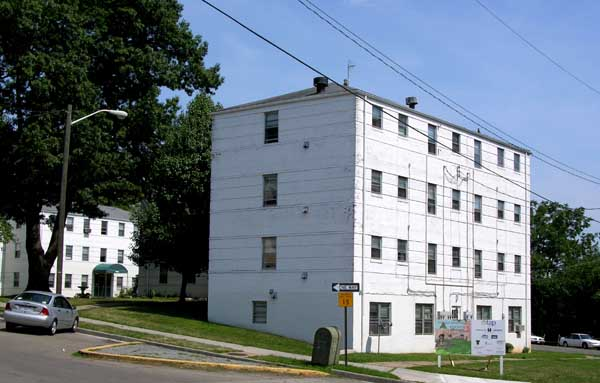
Roanoke Apartments, Roanoke

== Roanoke ==
- 425 Campbell Avenue, Roanoke, 1934
- 1306 Grandin Road, Roanoke, 1926
- Appalachian Electric Power Building, Roanoke, 1947
- Claytor Memorial Clinic, Roanoke, 1947
- Community Inn, Roanoke, 1929
- The Cornerstone, Roanoke, 1923
- General Office Building-North, Roanoke, 1931
- Grand Piano, N.W. Pugh & Company Department Store, Roanoke, 1930
- Mick-or-Mack Grocery, Roanoke, 1953
- Norfolk & Southern Railroad Office, Roanoke
- Ponce De Leon Hotel, Roanoke, 1931
- Professional Arts Building, Roanoke, 1929
- Roanoke Apartments, Roanoke, 1950
- Roanoke Passenger Station, Roanoke, 1949
- Roanoke Higher Education Center, Roanoke, 1931
- Television Center, Roanoke, 1955
- Walker Condos, Roanoke, 1937

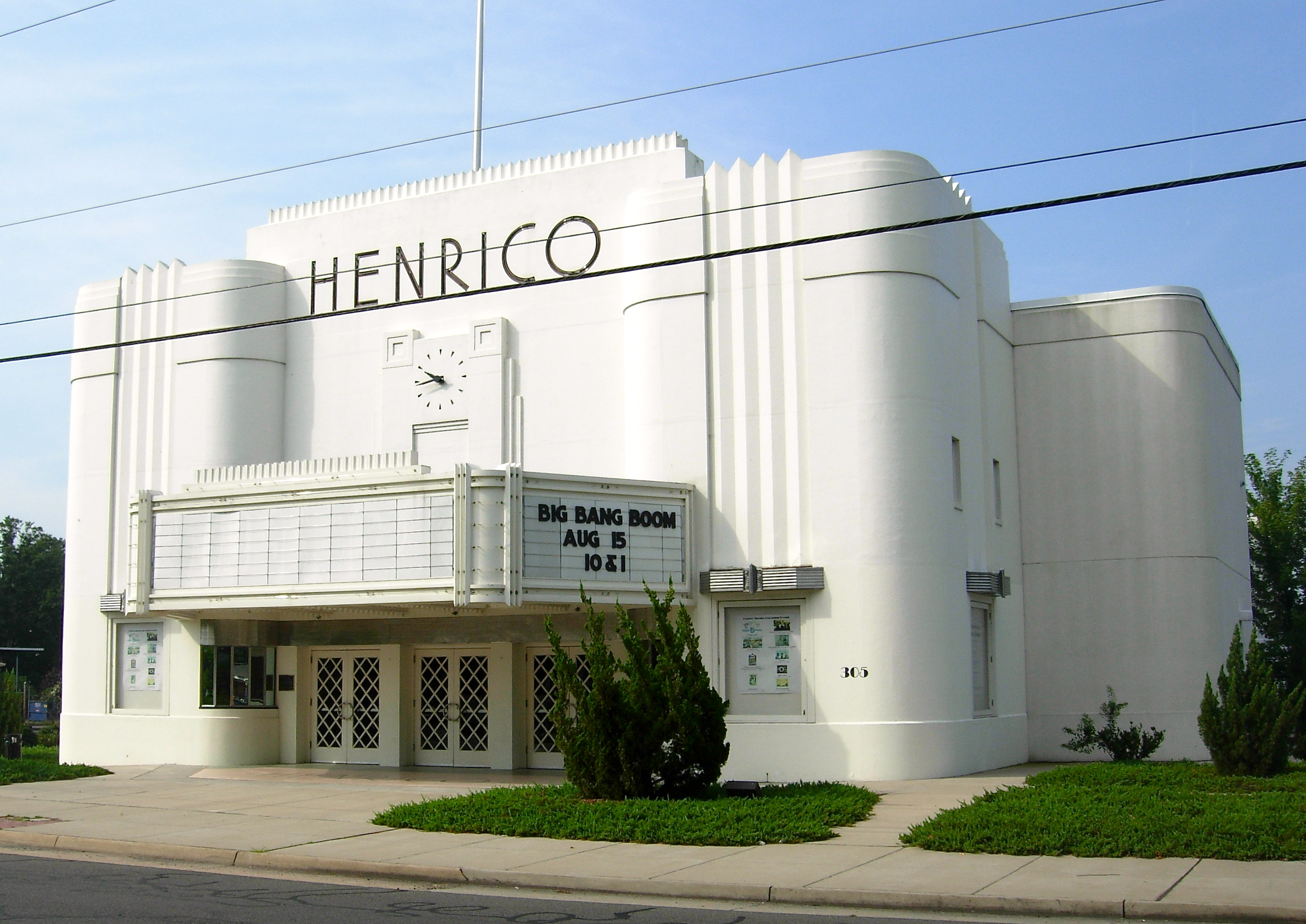
Henrico Theatre, Highland Springs

== Other cities ==
- 29 Diner, Fairfax, 1947
- Ashland Theatre Ashland, 1948
- Beacon Theatre, Hopewell, 1928
- Carl's Ice Cream, Fredericksburg, 1947
- Central High School, Painter, 1932
- Charlottesville Coca-Cola Bottling Works, Charlottesville, 1939
- Coca Cola Bottling Company, Newport News
- Donk's Theatre, Hudgins, 1947
- Emporia Armory, Emporia, 1936
- Executive Plaza, Bristol, 1925
- Frost Diner, Warrenton, 1946
- Hampton City Hall, Hampton, 1939
- Henrico Theatre, Highland Springs, 1938
- Hotel Warwick, Newport News, 1928
- Island Roxy, Chincoteague, 1945
- Lincoln Theatre, Marion, 1929
- New Hope High School, New Hope, 1925
- Palace Theatre, Cape Charles, 1941
- Pitts Theatre, Culpepper, 1937
- Randolph Hotel, Hopewell, 1927
- Royal Clipper Inn & Suites, Virginia Beach, 1980
- Shenandoah Motel, Front Royal, 1950
- StellarOne Bank Building, Rocky Mount, 1928
- Visulite Theatre, Staunton, 1937
- Walker–Grant School, Fredericksburg, 1938
- Whittaker Memorial Hospital, Newport News, 1943
- Winchester Coca-Cola Bottling Works, Winchester, 1941

== See also ==
- List of Art Deco architecture
- List of Art Deco architecture in the United States
