= Armstrong Elementary School =

Armstrong Elementary School may refer to:

== United States ==
- Armstrong Elementary School (California), part of Pomona Unified School District, in Pomona, California
- Armstrong Elementary School (Highland Park, Texas), in Highland Park, Texas
- Armstrong Elementary School (Sachse, Texas), part of Garland Independent School District, in Sachse, Texas
- Armstrong Elementary School (Lynchburg, Virginia), listed on the National Register of Historic Places (NRHP)

== Canada ==
- Armstrong Elementary School (Armstrong, British Columbia), part of School District 83 North Okanagan-Shuswap, in Armstrong, British Columbia
- Armstrong Elementary School (Burnaby, British Columbia), part of School District 41 Burnaby, in Burnaby, British Columbia
