= Winchester Coca-Cola Bottling Works =

- U.S. National Register of Historic Places
- Virginia Landmarks Register
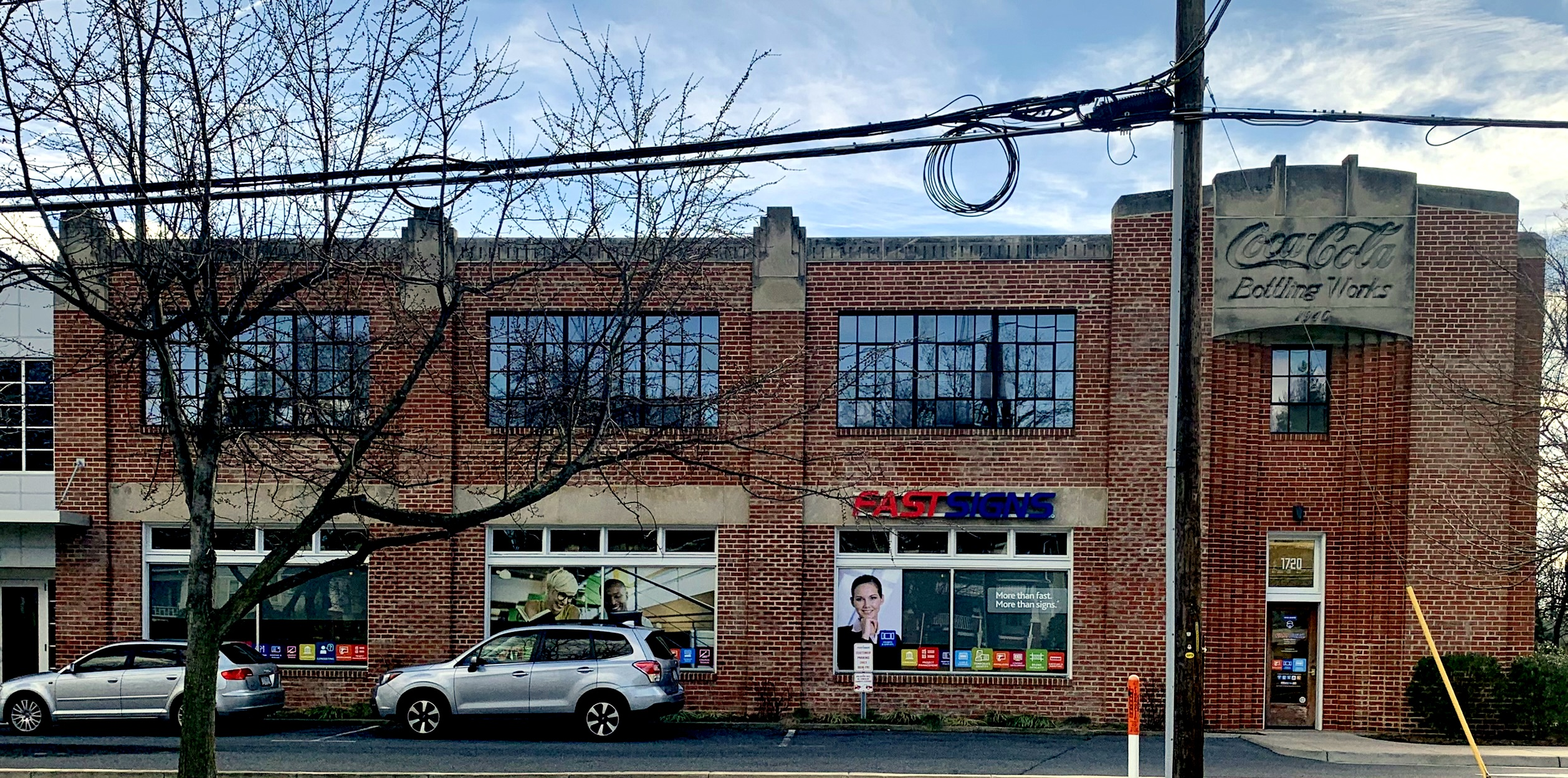
- Winchester Coca-Cola Bottling Works, 2022

- Location within Virginia Location within the United States
- Location: 1720 Valley Ave., Winchester, Virginia
- Coordinates: 39°10′14″N 78°10′39″W
- Area: 1.3 acres (0.53 ha)
- Built: 1940-1941
- Architect: Davis & Platt, Inc.; Platt, Doran S.
- Architectural style: Art Deco
- NRHP reference No.: 08000895
- VLR No.: 138-5044

Significant dates
- Added to NRHP: September 12, 2008
- Designated VLR: June 19, 2008

Winchester Coca-Cola Bottling Works is a historic Coca-Cola bottling plant located at Winchester, Virginia. It was built in 1940–1941, and is a two-story, reinforced concrete Art Deco style factory faced with brick. The asymmetrical four-bay façade features large plate-glass shop windows on the first floor that allowed the bottling operation to be viewed by the passing public. It has a one-story rear addition built in 1960, and a two-story warehouse added in 1974. Also on the property is a contributing one-story, brick storage building with a garage facility constructed in 1941. The facility closed in 2006.

It was added to the National Register of Historic Places in 2008.

== See also ==
- Charlottesville Coca-Cola Bottling Works
- List of Coca-Cola buildings and structures
- National Register of Historic Places listings in Winchester, Virginia
- Staunton Coca-Cola Bottling Works
