= Island Roxy =

Movie theater in Virginia, United States

Coordinates: 37°56′1.8″N 75°22′37.3″W

Island Theatre formerly the Island Roxy
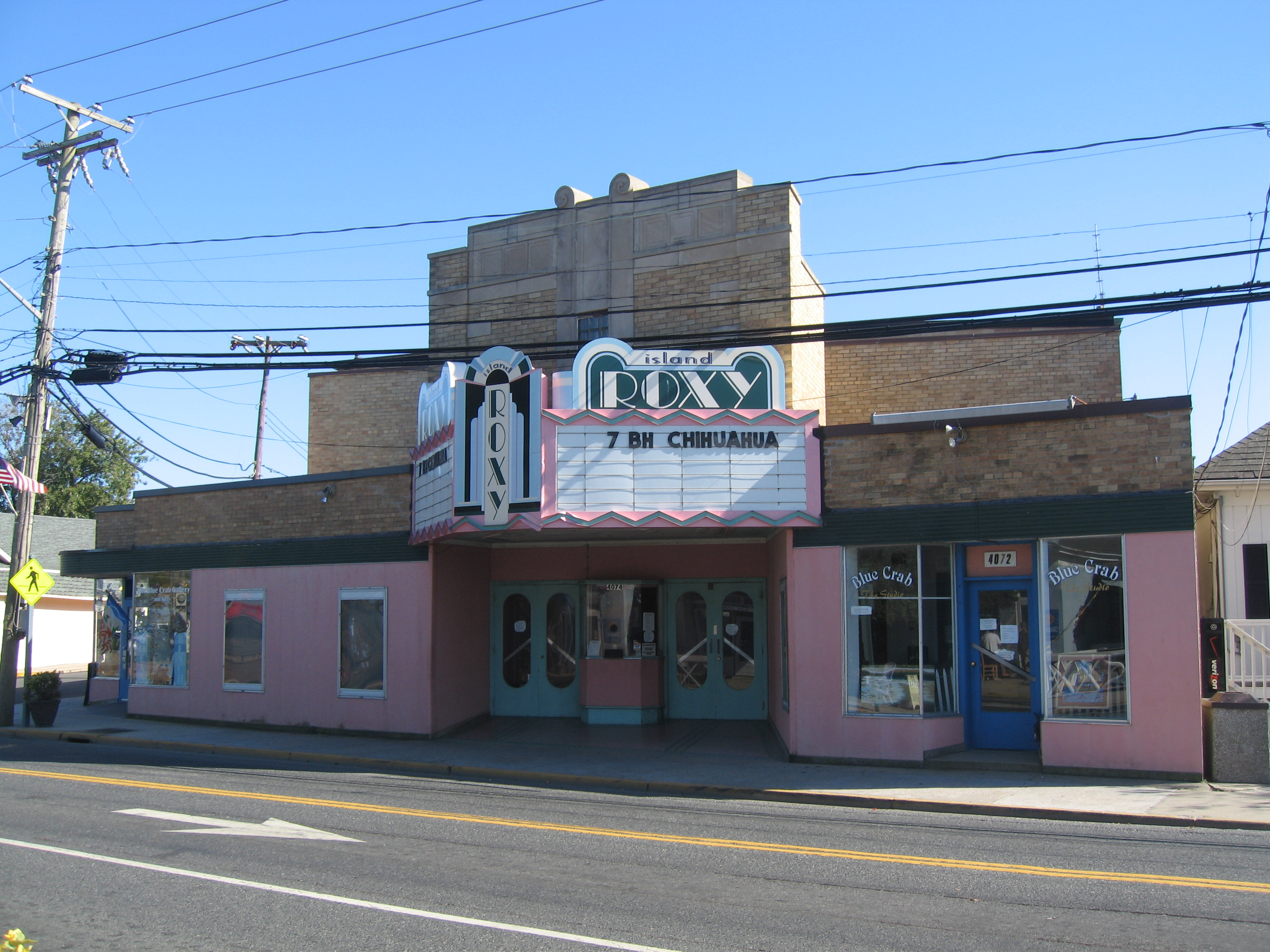
- Island Theatre
- Interactive map of the Island Theatre formerly the Island Roxy area

General information
- Architectural style: Art Deco
- Location: 4074 Main Street; Chincoteague, Virginia, United States
- Construction started: 1945
- Completed: 1947

Technical details
- Size: 352 seats

The Island Theatre is a historic U.S. building located at 4074 Main Street, Chincoteague, Virginia. It still serves as an operational movie theater. Originally named Island Theatre, the theatre was renamed Island Roxy from the 1980s until the name was reverted to Island Theatre in 2013.

== History ==
The theater, a Art Deco building, opened in 1945.

=== Misty ===
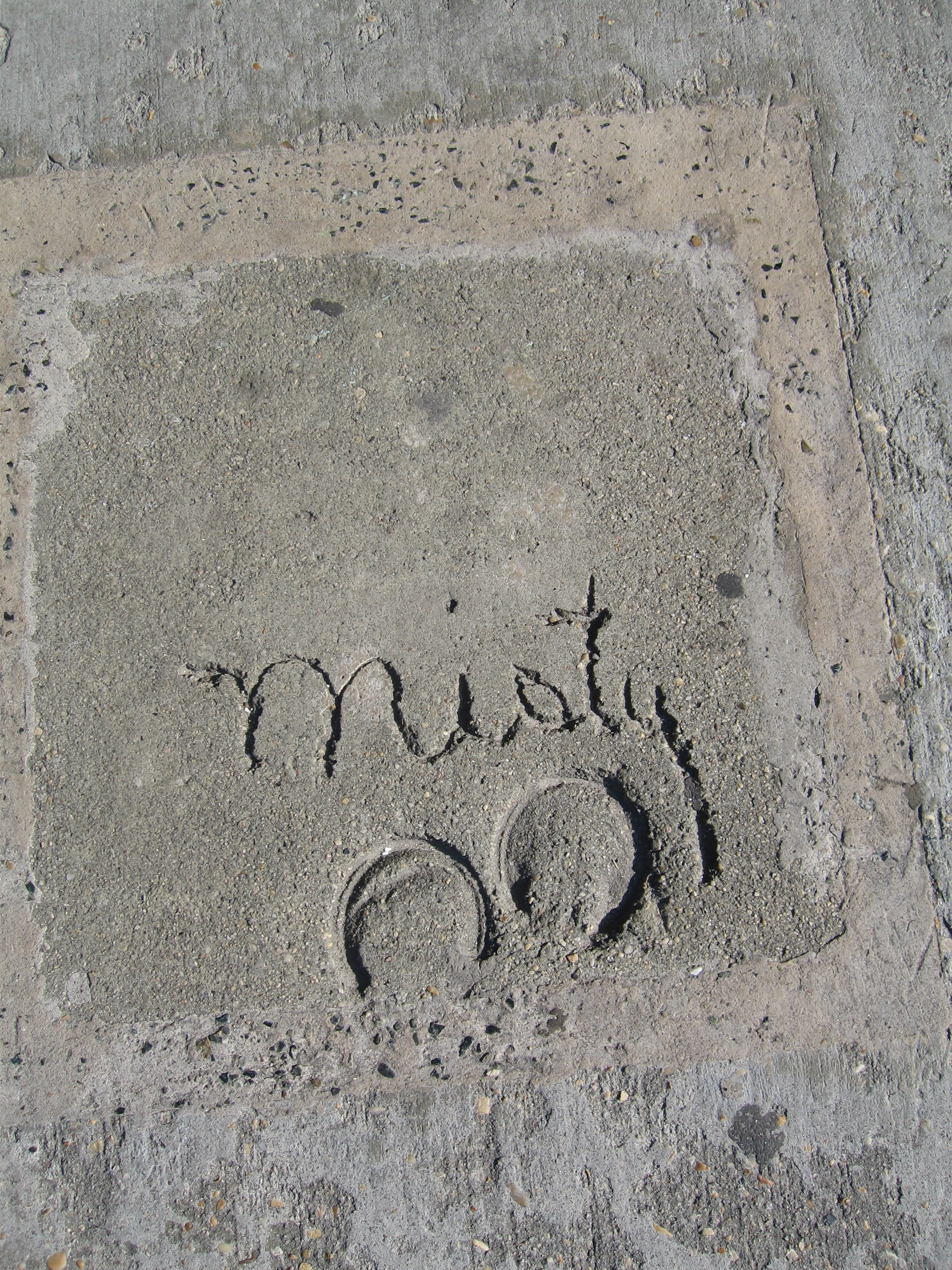
Misty hoofprints encased in concrete in front of the Island Roxy

In 1960, 20th Century Fox filmed the movie Misty on location at Chincoteague. In the same town, at the premiere of the film, in 1961, the star of the film, a Chincoteague Pony named Misty of Chincoteague marched down the aisles of the theater before the showing. The town memorialized Misty by encasing her hoofprints in concrete in front of the theatre (see image). Every year, the film is screened for free at the theatre.
