= William Michaelis =

William Otto Ernst Michaelis
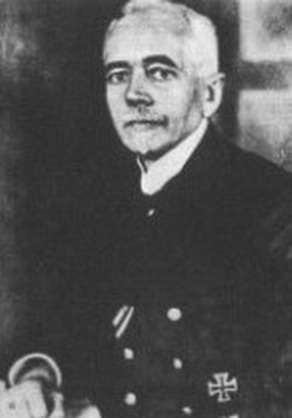
- Born: William Otto Ernst Michaelis; 19 July 1871; Bischofsburg, East Prussia
- Died: 5 January 1948 (aged 76); Putbus, Rügen
- Military career
- Allegiance: German Empire; Weimar Republic
- Branch: Imperial German Navy; Reichsmarine
- Service years: 1889–1920
- Rank: Vizeadmiral
- Commands: Thüringen
- Conflicts: World War I

William Otto Ernst Michaelis (19 July 1871 – 5 January 1948) was a German viceadmiral and head of the Naval Command within the Ministry of the Reichswehr in the Weimar Republic.

== Biography ==
Michaelis was born in Bischofsburg in the Province of Prussia to a civil engineer, he graduated from high school with a first. He entered the Imperial German Navy as a Seeoffizieranwärter in April 1889 and was promoted to Unterleutnant zur See (equivalent to ensign) in 1892. He served at the rank of Unterleutnant zur See from 1900 to 1902 as a deck officer and commander with the 1st Torpedo Boat Division in Kiel. He also attended Kiel's Naval Academy from 1900 to 1902, leading to service with the Reichsmarineamt (RMA) as a head of department and with the Admiralty Staff. He then served as first officer of a capital ship then as staff officer to the admiral of a squadron. From 4 February 1915 through 28 January 1916 he served as chief of staff to the Commander of the High Seas Fleet, Admiral Hugo von Pohl.

== Works ==
- "Kaiser Wilhelm II. und seine Marine. Kritische Beobachtungen während des Kaisermanövers in der Nordsee Herbst 1912. Aus den Erinnerungen von Vizeadmiral William Michaelis" (Kaiser Wilhelm II and his Navy - critical observations made during the royal manoeuvres in the North Sea in autumn 1912, from the memoirs of vice admiral William Michaelis), reprinted 1976
- "Tirpitz' Wirken vor und während des Ersten Weltkriegs" (The Work of Tirpitz before and after the First World War), paper of 1934

== Sources ==
- (in German) Biography in "Die Akten der Reichskanzlei" in the Bundesarchiv
- (in German) Rahn, Werner: "Deutsche Marinen im Wandel. Vom Symbol nationaler Einheit zum Instrument internationaler Sicherheit", 2005, S. 397, S. 420 Anmerkungen ISBN 3-486-57674-7
