= Henry Axel Bueck =

Prussian House of Representatives
- In office 1894–1898
- Constituency: Düsseldorf

Personal details
- Born: 12 December 1830; Bischofsburg, East Prussia, Kingdom of Prussia (now Biskupiec, Poland)
- Died: 4 July 1916 (aged 85); Berlin, German Empire
- Citizenship: Prussian, German
- Political party: National Liberal Party (Germany)

Henry Axel Bueck (12 December 1830 – 4 July 1916) was a German business executive, politician and employer and industry representative.

== Biography ==
Bueck was born in Bischofsburg, East Prussia, Kingdom of Prussia (now Biskupiec, Poland), to Johann Axel Bueck, a physician, and Adelaide Bueck, née Marichaux. He attended school in Königsberg (Kaliningrad) from 1842 to 1847. After completing an agricultural apprenticeship he worked as an estate manager for 12 years. In 1860 he bought an agricultural estate in Stannaitschen, East Prussia. From 1866 to 1873 he worked additionally as the Secretary General of the "Central agricultural association for Lithuania and Masuria" ("Landwirtschaftlicher Zentralverein für Litauen und Masuren").

In 1867 Bueck attended the agricultural conference in Berlin, where he met Conrad Bertelsmann who suggested him as managing director of the newly founded "Association for the protection of common economic interests in Rhineland and Westphalia" ("Langnamverein") in 1871. In 1873 Bueck moved to Düsseldorf to take over this position and, in 1874, also became business executive of the Northwest Group of the "Association of German Iron and Steel Industrialists".

In 1882 he joined the editorial board of "Stahl und Eisen", the official publication journal of the Association of German Iron and Steel industrialists. In 1887 he went to Berlin and became executive director of the "Central Association of German Industrialists", a position he held until 1910. From 1887 to 1912 he was the business executive of the "Association of German Iron and Steel Industrialists" ("Verein deutscher Eisen- und Stahlindustrieller") and from 1904 on manager of the Confederation of German Employers' Associations ("Hauptstelle deutscher Arbeitgeberverbände").

From 1894 to 1898 he represented Düsseldorf in the Prussian House of Representatives. Bueck died in Berlin in 1916.

== Family ==
Bueck was married to Luise née Sylla and had one son and three daughters.

== Awards ==
- Order of the Red Eagle (2. class)
- Order of the Crown (Prussia) 2. class
- Officer of the Saxonian Albert Order
