= Ellen Tiedtke =

German actress (1930–2022)

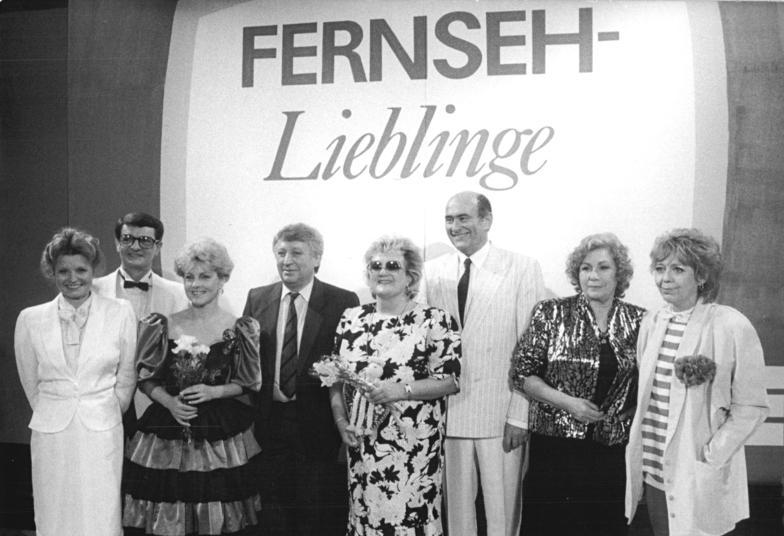
Ellen Tiedtke (right) voting during the "TV Favorites 1987"

Ellen Tiedtke (16 March 1930 – 1 February 2022) was a German actress and cabaret artist. Tiedtke became known primarily through the GDR children's program Ellentie, which ran from 1983 to 1991. She died on 1 February 2022, at the age of 91.

== Life ==
Born in Bischofsburg, East Prussia, Prussia, Germany (Biskupiec, Poland), Tiedtke studied at the Academy of Fine Arts Leipzig from 1949 to 1952 and was then employed at the Stadttheater Cottbus until 1954. Here, together with Ursula Wagner, Erhard Köster, Walter Niklaus and Edi Weeber-Fried, she was one of the founding members of the local cabaret ensemble "Die Sticklinge".

In 1956/1957, she performed in the "Leipziger Pfeffermühle" and later in the Berlin ensemble "Die Distel" until 1964. She then started freelancing as a singer in the manner of Claire Waldoff. In 1961 she received the GDR Art Prize and the GDR National Prize as a member of the cabaret collective "Die Distel". In addition, she appeared in 1964 in the TV thriller Doppelt oder nicht and in the DEFA comedy Ohne Paß in fremden Betten, in 1980 in the political drama Die Verlobte and between 1978 and 1983 in various roles in several children's TV films about the clown Ferdinand.

Tiedtke became known in the GDR mainly through the children's program Ellentie, which was broadcast on Wednesdays on the GDR's second television channel from 1983 to 1991 and consisted of feature films, games and conversations with children. The readers of the german's television magazine FF dabei voted her their fan favorite twice for this program.

In 1985, she released a record entitled Ellen Tiedtke sings mit Herz und Schnauze.

She was married to Hans Rascher. Ellen Tiedtke died in February 2022 in a Berlin hospital at the age of 91.
