= Charlottesville Coca-Cola Bottling Works =

Historic bottling plant in Virginia, US

- U.S. National Register of Historic Places
- Virginia Landmarks Register
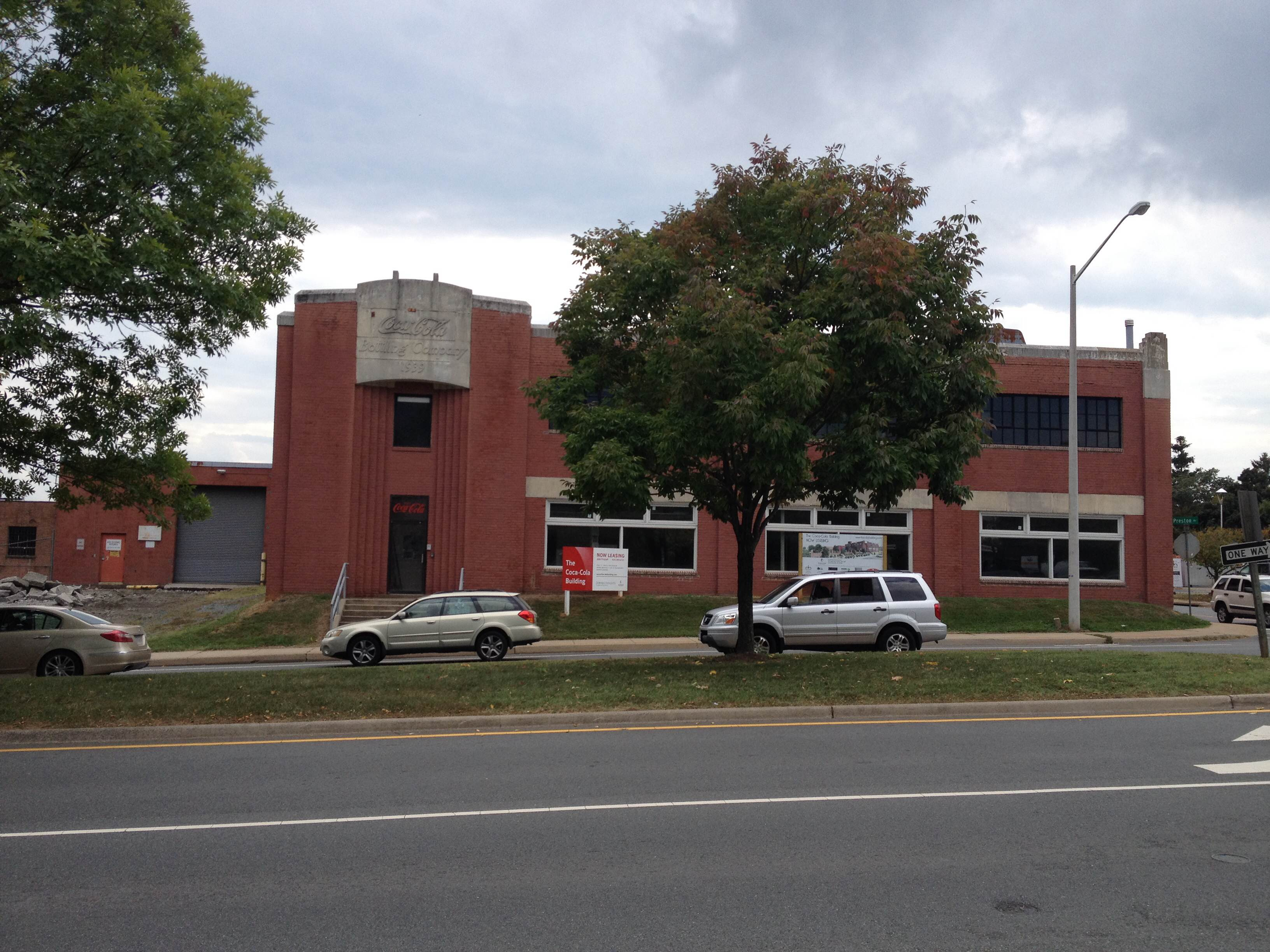

- Location within Virginia Location within the United States
- Location: 722 Preston Ave., Charlottesville, Virginia
- Coordinates: 38°02′10″N 78°29′17″W
- Area: .95 acres (0.38 ha)
- Built: 1939, 1955, 1981
- Built by: Davis & Platt,
- Architect: Platt, Doran S.
- Architectural style: Art Deco
- NRHP reference No.: 13000045
- VLR No.: 104-5174

Significant dates
- Added to NRHP: February 27, 2013
- Designated VLR: December 13, 2012

Charlottesville Coca-Cola Bottling Works is a historic Coca-Cola bottling plant located at Charlottesville, Virginia. It was built in 1939, and is a two-story, reinforced concrete Art Deco style factory faced with brick. It has one-story wing and a detached one-story, 42-truck brick garage supported by steel posts and wood rafters. The design features stepped white cast stone pilaster caps, rising above the coping of the parapet, top the pilasters and corner piers and large industrial style windows. In 1955 a one-story attached brick addition was made on the east side of the garage providing a bottle and crate storage warehouse. In 1981 a one-story, L-shaped warehouse built of cinder blocks was added to the plant. The building was in use as a production facility until 1973 and then as a Coca-Cola distribution center until 2010.

It was listed on the National Register of Historic Places in 2013.

== See also ==
- Winchester Coca-Cola Bottling Works
- List of Coca-Cola buildings and structures
- National Register of Historic Places listings in Charlottesville, Virginia
- Staunton Coca-Cola Bottling Works
