= Palace Theatre (Cape Charles, Virginia) =

- Interactive map of the Palace Theatre area

General information
- Architectural style: Art Deco
- Location: 305 Mason Avenue; Cape Charles, Virginia, United States
- Coordinates: 37°16′2.3″N 76°1′2.5″W
- Completed: 1941

Technical details
- Size: 400 Seats

Design and construction
- Architect: Alfred M. Lublin

The Palace Theatre is a historic movie house located at 305 Mason Avenue, Cape Charles, Virginia, United States. It currently functions as a performing arts venue.

== History ==
Built in 1941, the Palace Theatre originally served as a movie house. The building was designed by the German-born architect Alfred M. Lublin, an admirer of Gropius.

=== Current use ===
On July 7, 1998, the non-profit organization Arts Enter acquired the theatre to use for arts and cultural events and education. In addition, Arts Enter commenced a renovation project to restore the theatre to its original condition.
