= Model Tobacco Factory =

Historic building in Virginia, US

- U.S. National Register of Historic Places
- Virginia Landmarks Register
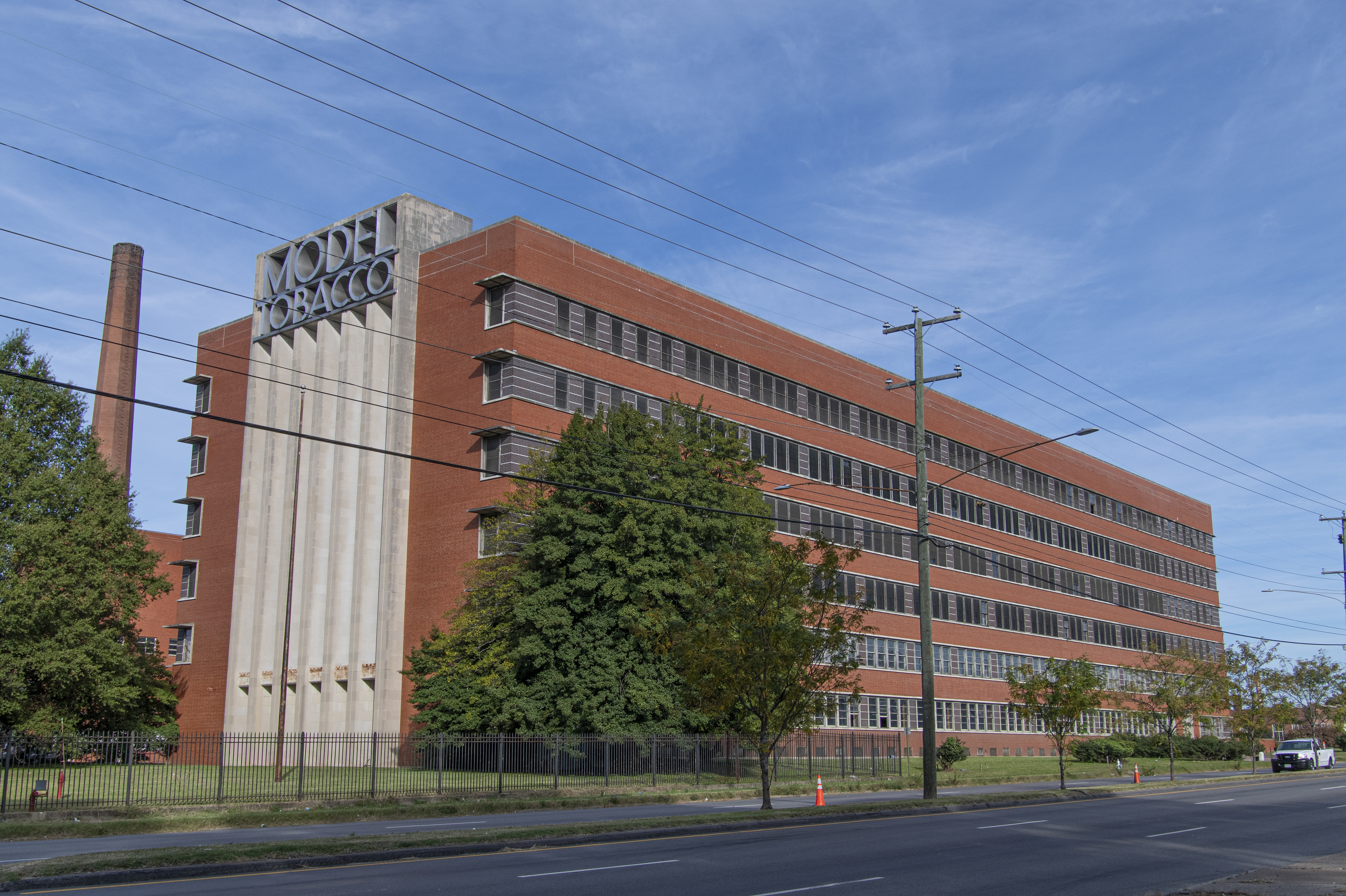
- The Model Tobacco Factory in 2020

- Location within Virginia Location within the United States
- Location: 1100 Jefferson Davis Highway, Richmond, Virginia
- Coordinates: 37°30′18″N 77°26′51″W
- Area: 11.89 acres (4.81 ha)
- Built: 1938
- Architect: Schmidt, Garden, and Erikson
- Architectural style: Art Deco, International
- NRHP reference No.: 100003617
- VLR No.: 127-0386

Significant dates
- Added to NRHP: April 15, 2019
- Designated VLR: December 13, 2018

The Model Tobacco Factory is a historic industrial complex located in Richmond, Virginia. It was built beginning in 1938, and consists of ten contributing structures, including a prominent six-story rectangular factory building designed in the Art Deco style. The building was designed by the Chicago architecture firm of Schmidt, Garden and Erikson and is known for its Moderne "sky sign" that dominates the north end of the building.

It is one of many Art Deco buildings in Richmond, including assorted buildings on Grace Street including the Central National Bank building, the Virginia Union Belgian Building, Medical College of Virginia's West Hospital, Henrico Theatre, Thomas Jefferson High School (Richmond, Virginia), and Nolde Bakery, 306-308 North 26th Street, and the Patrick Henry Building on 1111 E. Board Street built in 1938-40.

The building was listed on the National Register of Historic Places in 2019. As of 2021 the site was being redeveloped as an apartment complex.

== History ==
The complex was constructed beginning in 1938 by the United States Tobacco Company. Model Tobacco was the company's bestselling brand, and was one of many brands produced at the factory. The site consists of ten contributing structures, grouped primarily in three sections: a six-story factory, a power plant, and storage warehouses. The horizontal nature of the factory's construction reflected changes in tobacco production during the mid-20th century. The most prominent building in the complex is the factory building, which was designed by architects Schmidt, Garden, and Erikson in the Art Deco style, with additional elements of International Style.

In 2008, a developer had proposed turning the property into over 600 apartments at a projected cost of $84 million. That development fell through due to the Great Recession, however. In 2020, the property was sold to Christopher Harrison, a former NFL player turned real estate developer. As of 2021 it was undergoing a $59 million renovation into over 200 upscale apartments.
