= New Hope High School (New Hope, Virginia) =

Historic school building in Virginia, US

- U.S. National Register of Historic Places
- Virginia Landmarks Register
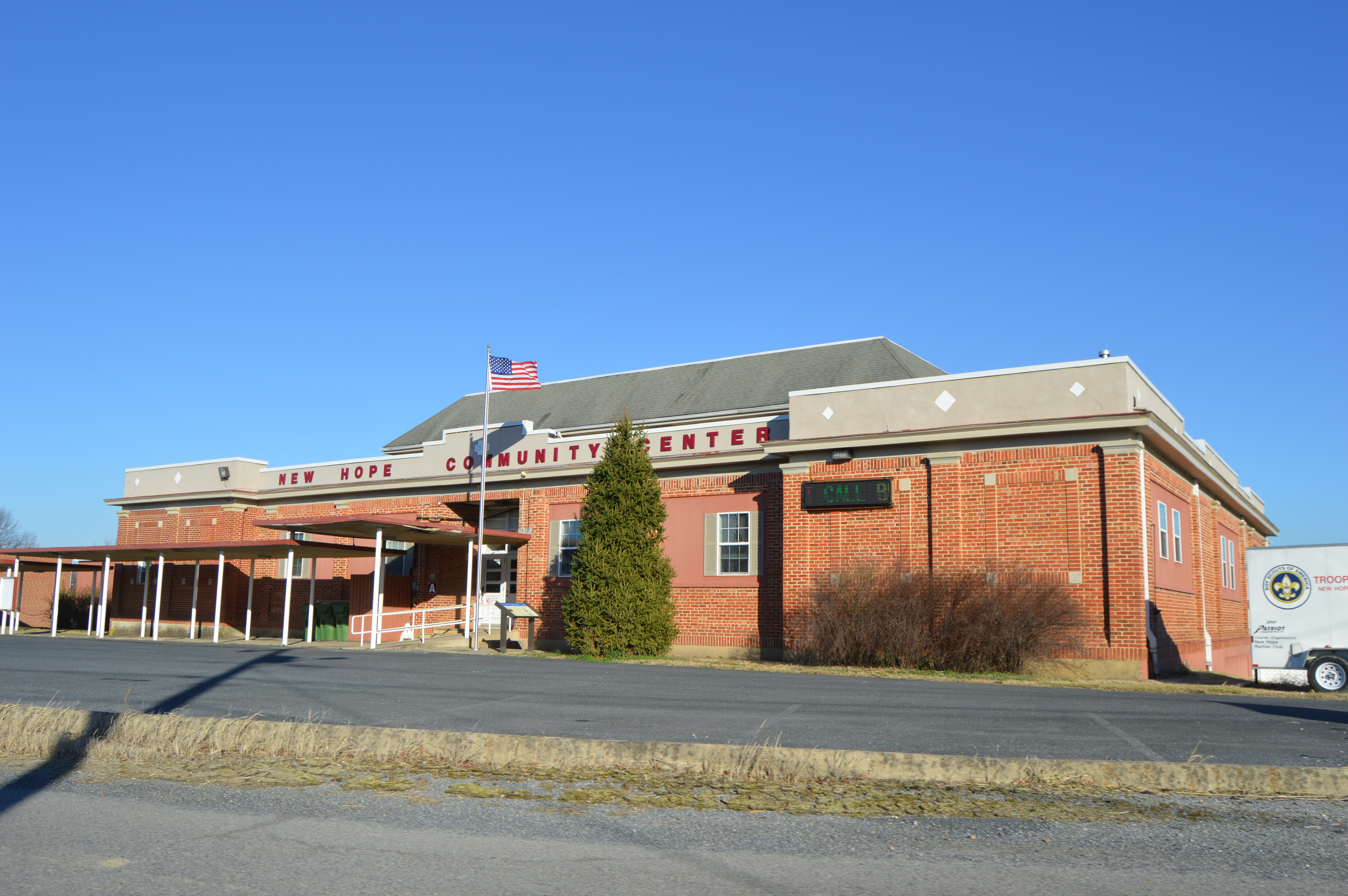
- Front of the school

- Location within Virginia Location within the United States
- Location: VA 608, New Hope, Virginia
- Coordinates: 38°12′4″N 78°54′14″W
- Area: 3.5 acres (1.4 ha)
- Built: 1925, 1942
- Architectural style: Art Deco
- MPS: Public Schools in Augusta County Virginia 1870-1940 TR
- NRHP reference No.: 85000393
- VLR No.: 007-1087

Significant dates
- Added to NRHP: February 27, 1985
- Designated VLR: December 11, 1984

New Hope High School is a historic public school building located at New Hope, Augusta County, Virginia. It was built in 1925, and is a brick building consisting of an auditorium/gymnasium as the core of the building with rectangular flat roofed blocks on either side. The central auditorium/gymnasium has a tall hipped roof. It has Art Deco style stepped facades on the front and sides, embellished with diamond-shaped concrete blocks along the cornice. A three-room north wing was added in 1942. Also on the property is a contributing brick agriculture building built in 1926.

It was listed on the National Register of Historic Places in 1985.
