= New Hope, Augusta County, Virginia =

Census-designated place in Virginia, US

Coordinates: 38°11′52″N 78°54′21″W

New Hope is a census-designated place (CDP) in Augusta County, Virginia, United States. The population as of the 2010 Census was 797.

New Hope High School was listed on the National Register of Historic Places in 1985.

== Demographics ==
Historical population
Census	Pop.	Note	%±
U.S. Decennial Census; 2010 2020

New Hope was first listed as a census designated place in the 2010 U.S. census.
