= Arlington Cinema 'N' Drafthouse =

Movie theater in Arlington, Virginia, United States

- Interactive map of the Arlington Cinema 'N' Drafthouse area

General information
- Architectural style: Art Deco
- Location: 2903 Columbia Pike, Arlington County, Virginia
- Coordinates: 38.8626°N 77.0873°W
- Opened: August 15, 1940

Design and construction
- Architect: Fred Bishop

Website
- www.arlingtondrafthouse.com

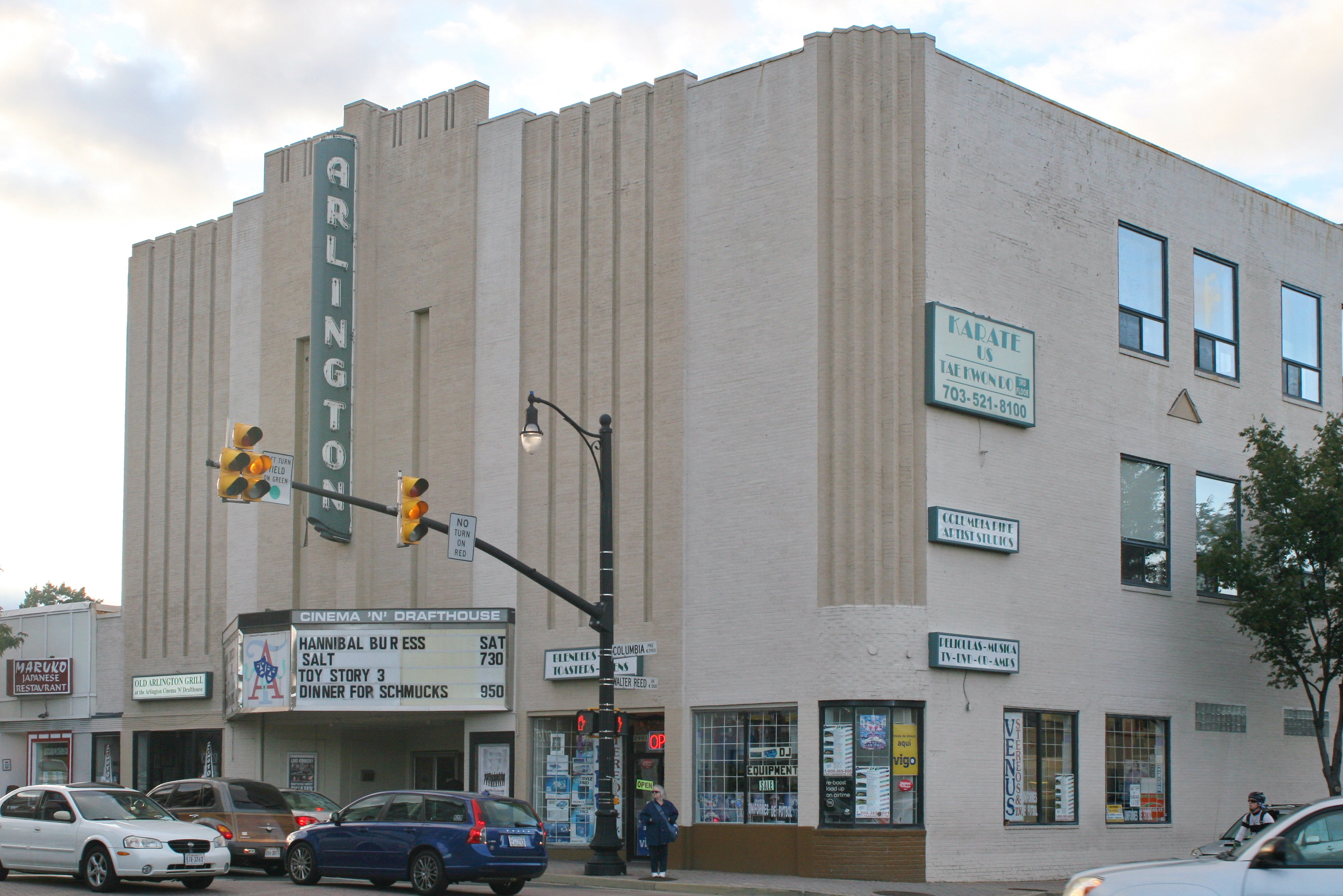
Image of the Arlington Cinema 'N' Drafthouse

The "Arlington Cinema 'N' Drafthouse", located at 2903 Columbia Pike, is the only remaining theater in Arlington County, Virginia from the cinema boom period of the 1930s and 1940s that still operates as a movie theater, and is currently one of four movie theaters operating in Arlington County. It is one of Arlington County's 23 Historic properties identified in the highest category of "Essential"—those with the greatest historical, architectural or visual prominence in the community. It is also the only theater in the country to balance top national release films and top national touring comics.

== History ==
Originally, it was called the "Arlington Theater & Bowling Alleys", part of the "Arlington Recreational Center" which was opened on Thursday, August 15, 1940. The building was commissioned by Dr. Charles P. Munson in 1939 and built by A.H. Brooks Real Estate & Insurance. The recreational center also featured a large 24 lane bowling alley on the second & third floors, some department stores, and "The Arlington Pharmacy" on the corner.

After Franklin D. Roosevelt's New Deal, in the 1930s, and the establishment of the Federal Housing Administration in 1934 during the era of the Great Depression, there was much needed economic relief to the suburbs surrounding Washington, D.C. As a result, the neighborhoods of Arlington, in the late 1930s, experienced a population boom. The creation of new federal jobs in DC and the improved conditions for homebuyers allowed many new residents to settle in the area. This gave local landowners and entrepreneurs an opportunity to develop new ventures and businesses in this period of economic revival. The construction of the "Arlington Theater", in particular, brought attention to Columbia Pike, sparking residential development and helping to mark a transition of the area from a rural countryside into a burgeoning commercial district with a thoroughfare to the nation's capitol.

Construction of the theater required the demolition of a general store known as M. Sher & Sons General Merchandise, originally called C.F. Burner's Emporium (established 1904), which was owned by Dr. Munson. Dr. Munson, a local dentist and chairman of the Arlington schoolboard, spent his retirement years actively buying land and building houses and commercial structures, including the "Arlington Theater" and Dorchester Towers. He contributed to platting and subdividing many properties in what is now known as the historic “Arlington Heights” district of Arlington, Virginia.

The "Arlington Theater" was operated under Richmond-based Neighborhood Theaters of Virginia Inc. Neighborhood Theaters operated theaters in Arlington, Falls Church, Wilson, Ashton, and Buckingham and was owned by Morton G. Thalhimer Jr. of the Thalhimers Family (Which later merged with Hecht's and is now part of Macy's).

The Theater first opened with Cary Grant and Irene Dunne in the film “My Favorite Wife”, followed by Jeanette MacDonald and Nelson Eddy in "New Moon", and Linda Darnell and John Payne in "Star Dust". Tickets for the shows were 25 cents in 1940. You could get popcorn for 10 cents.

=== Desegregation ===
"The Arlington Theater & Bowling Alleys" had been a "Whites Only" establishment until 1963. Following in the footsteps of the Brown v. Board of Education lawsuits, figures such as Dorothy Hamm, and other civil rights activists began a campaign of picketing, protests, and lawsuits in an effort to desegregate schools and other public facilities throughout Arlington County. Dorothy and her supporters began picketing outside of several establishments, including theaters, in Arlington and surrounding counties because of the "whites only" restriction to the buildings.

Dorothy, and several other protestors were arrested for their picketing which was disrupting business at the theaters. Two black women were arrested at the "Glebe Theater" in Arlington and the "Jefferson Theater" in Fairfax for attempting to purchase tickets. In November 1962, the two women initiated a civil court suit against Neighborhood Theaters Inc., who owned both theaters. Dorothy Hamm became involved in the court actions and in June 1963 a deal was struck that would admit non-white patrons at all locations owned by Neighborhood Theaters Inc.. Additionally, two sections of Virginia code were thrown out that previously made it possible to arrest and charge blacks in Virginia theaters or public halls for not complying with segregation laws. Some trespassing laws still existed that may have been exploited by business owners to prevent blacks from freely attending. However, because of the deals made with Neighborhood Theaters Inc., "Arlington Theater" became one of the first desegregated theaters in Virginia. Dorothy and her son Edward Leslie Jr., became the first black customers to be admitted.

== Architecture ==
The Architect, Fred Bishop, was responsible for the original design. Bishop designed seven theaters in Virginia and one in North Carolina from the 1920s to the 1940s. Only three theatres designed by Bishop are still standing. Besides the “Cinema 'N' Drafthouse”, the “Byrd Theatre” in Richmond and the “Beacon Theatre” in Hopewell are still operational.

The "Arlington Theater" was constructed in the Art Deco style. It had a capacity for 616 seats. Films were projected via 35mm, Simplex E7 projector, with Magnarc Carbon Arc lamp houses. The building was designed to be fireproof and was outfitted with a Carrier air conditioning system which kept the theater, the bowling alleys, and "The Arlington Pharmacy" on the corner "cool and refreshing".

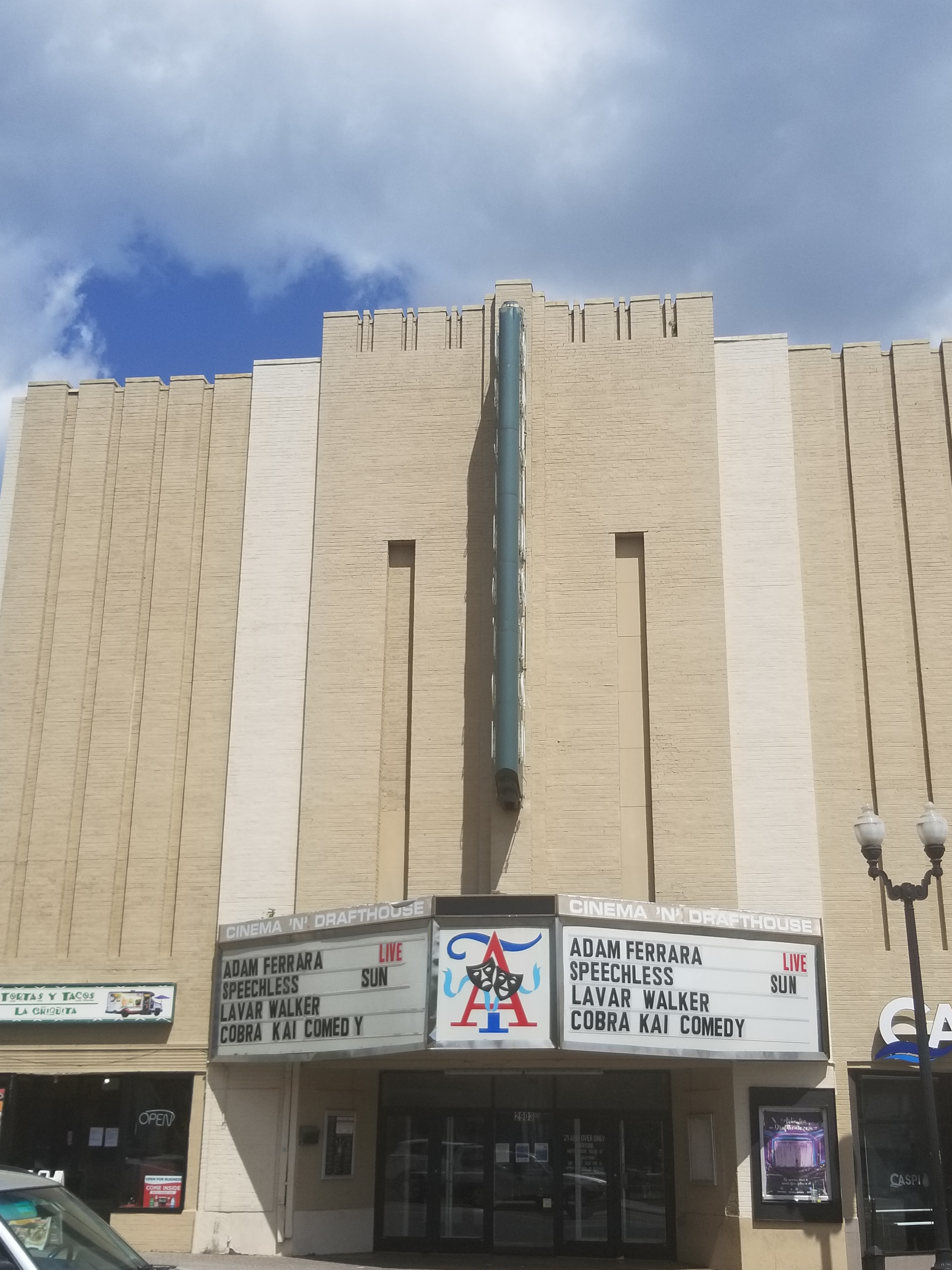
Front façade of the Arlington Cinema 'N' Drafthouse

The façade is constructed entirely of brick painted white and light mauve. Several vertical elements, with subtle stepped forms, are shown above the main entrance and the side entrance. The corner of the building at the intersection is rounded, with vertical strips extending up the second and third stories. The left side entrance is also rounded at the first floor only. The main entrance is about 20 feet across with a vertical projection above the entrance area extending slightly past the third story height. The layers of the façade projection are fairly shallow, but distinguished with light mauve paint. The center of the main projection features a vertical blue sign above the entrance and marquee reading “ARLINGTON” in Deco-style neon lighting. On either side of the vertical sign are flat black panels about 1 foot wide and 20 feet high. At the top of the central projection, the brick façade has 6 notches on either side of the center line. At street level, the entrance is recessed about 10 feet with two pairs of glass doors under a marquee sign with traditional hand-placed black lettering. The main theater entrance is flanked by entrances for two restaurants– on the right "Caspi", is occupying the primary corner retail space which used to be "The Arlington Pharmacy". The brick façade overhead has 5 vertical strips on either side extending up the second and third stories.

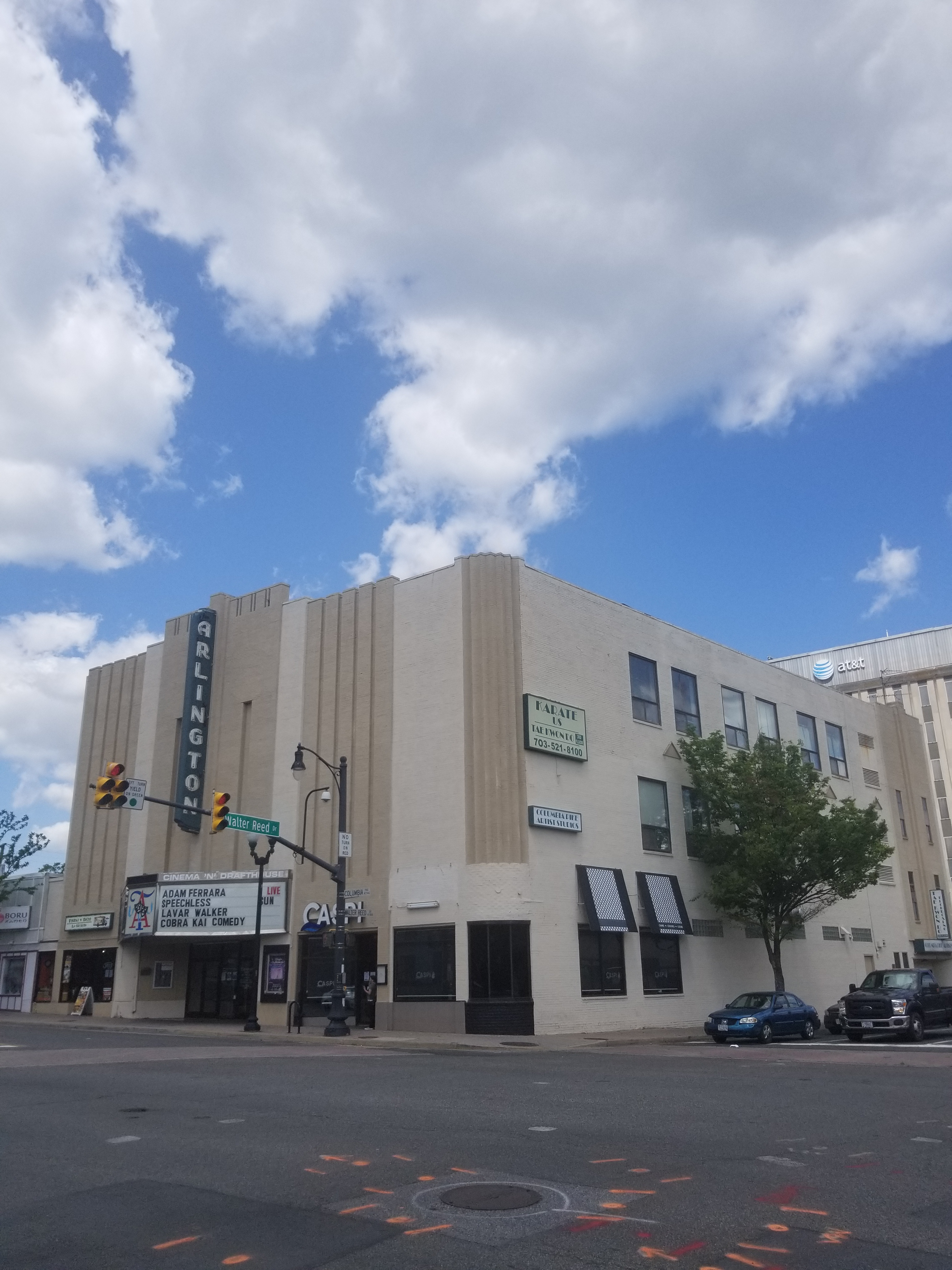
View from the corner of Walter Reed Dr. and Columbia Pike

On the east side, the curved corner at the intersection is set off by a large curved window on the first floor and five vertical zigzag notches extending up the second and third stories, painted in mauve. There are five narrow horizontal glass block windows on the first story. The second and third stories have six modern replacement windows on each story, the seventh window in each row (closest to the side entrance) are used as a vent screens. The corner restaurant "Caspi" at the street level has five large windows, including the curved corner window, two on the east side and two on the south side. The entire east side of the building, with the exception of the minor side entrance vertical projection, is painted off-white. There are three mauve diamond-shaped flat decorative elements on the east façade between the second and third story row of windows.

The minor side entrance is at the end of the building immediately before it steps down to a one-story height for three retail shops. This entrance provides access to artists’ studios on the second floor and a Taekwondo studio on the third floor, both housed in the former bowling alley space. The side entrance is similar in appearance to the major entrance projection, with similar proportions and elements but on a narrower scale. The vertical projection extends up the façade through the second and third stories. The center strip and two flanking strips are painted in rose, with intermediate white strips. There is no vertical sign for this entrance, only a modern horizontal sign over the doorway with two pairs of glass doors. The vertical flanking strips have two narrow vertical modern replacement windows on both sides, in a similar orientation as the flat black panels on the main entrance façade.

== Re-opening ==
By 1975, Neighborhood Theaters of Virginia Inc. was facing financial difficulties and the "Arlington Theater" was turned over to owner, Tom Sarris. The Theater continued to run feature films but struggled as the Multiplex Cinema model became more popular. Single screen theaters were at a disadvantage if the films they chose to premier turned out to be flops. Multi-screen theaters could air several films at once and avoid suffering the same consequences.

In 1985 the theater was acquired by Tony Fischer. Fischer had a new concept for the Theater. He already owned and operated a dine-in "cinema and drafthouse" in Bethesda, Maryland, the "Bethesda Cinema & Drafthouse" (now called the "Bethesda Theatre"). Fischer converted the interior of the Arlington Theater, removing the old seating, installing a bar and a kitchen, and replacing the 35mm projector with a digital one. Shortly afterwards, the "Arlington Theater" was reopened as the "Arlington Cinema 'N' Drafthouse", with the same historic façade.

The renovated theater seated roughly 275 with its new "dine-in" set up. Customers sat in comfortable office chairs with tables and ample room for waiting staff to serve food & drink before and during shows. The theater ran second-run movies almost every day of the year.

In August 2005 the "Cinema 'N' Drafthouse" changed hands again. A year earlier, entrepreneur Greg Godbout had gone to see a movie at the "Drafthouse" with his wife. He liked the concept but felt that there was something missing that could improve the experience. He spoke with Fischer and decided to purchase the theater with co-owner Tim Clark and his family.

The new owners invested $45,000 on renovations and on December 14, 2007, Greg applied for a zoning permit with Arlington County to present live entertainment inside the restaurant. Musical acts such "Mancino", "The Sikes", and "Jimmie's Chicken Shack" were among the first live performances.

Pretty soon the "Drafthouse" was also booking comedians to take spots on the main stage while alternating major motion pictures. Andy Kindler and Todd Barry were among the first touring comics booked. However, local comedians had been performing as early as June, 2006 in "The Drafthouse Comedy Lounge" (Also called "The Green Room"), which was a space with a small bar that branched off from the main lobby of the Theater. (The space was once converted into "The Old Arlington Grill", but is now called "Tortas y Tacos La Chiquita", a Mexican restaurant). The first comedy line-up to perform at the "Lounge" were Jessica Paquin, Erin Jackson, Norman Wilkerson, Rob Maher and Justin Schlegel.

Since then, the "Drafthouse" has been a hotspot for comedy in the area. They continually book some of the nation's best touring comics at the original theater space. A second location opened in April of 2016 in Washington, D.C., on the corner of 13th and L streets NW., a New York style, off-Broadway, black box theater called "Drafthouse Comedy". The D.C. location closed in December of 2020 due to the COVID-19 pandemic restrictions in place at the time.

=== Notable comedians/performers ===
- John Mulaney
- Doug Benson
- Jay Chandrasekhar
- Michael Kosta
- Patton Oswalt
- Rhys Darby
- Tracy Morgan
- Bobby Lee
- Michelle Buteau
- Steve Rannazzisi
- Hal Sparks
- Erica Rhodes
- Michael Ian Black
- Dana Gould
- Tom Arnold
- Joe Zimmerman
- Christopher Titus
- Alex Moffat
- Carlos Mencia
- Gary Gulman
- Nate Bargatze
- Janeane Garofalo
- David Alan Grier
- Jon Lovitz
- Chris Kattan
- Steve Lemme
- Kevin Heffernan
- Alonzo Bodden
- Nick Thune
- Darrell Hammond
- Chris Distefano
- Adam Ferrara
- Tony Woods
- Dan Harmon
- Marc Maron
- Maria Bamford
- Brian Posehn
- Doug Stanhope
- Trevor Noah
- Amy Schumer
- Shawn Wayans
- Jim Breuer
- Byron Bowers
- Ronny Chieng
- Jason Nash
- Joe DeRosa
- Neal Brennan
- James Adomian
- Laurie Kilmartin
- Shazia Mirza
- Ali Wong
- Yannis Pappas
- Shane Gillis
- Chris Gethard
- T.J. Miller
- Chad Daniels
