= Blacksburg Motor Company, Inc. =

Historic commercial building in Virginia, United States

- U.S. National Register of Historic Places
- Virginia Landmarks Register
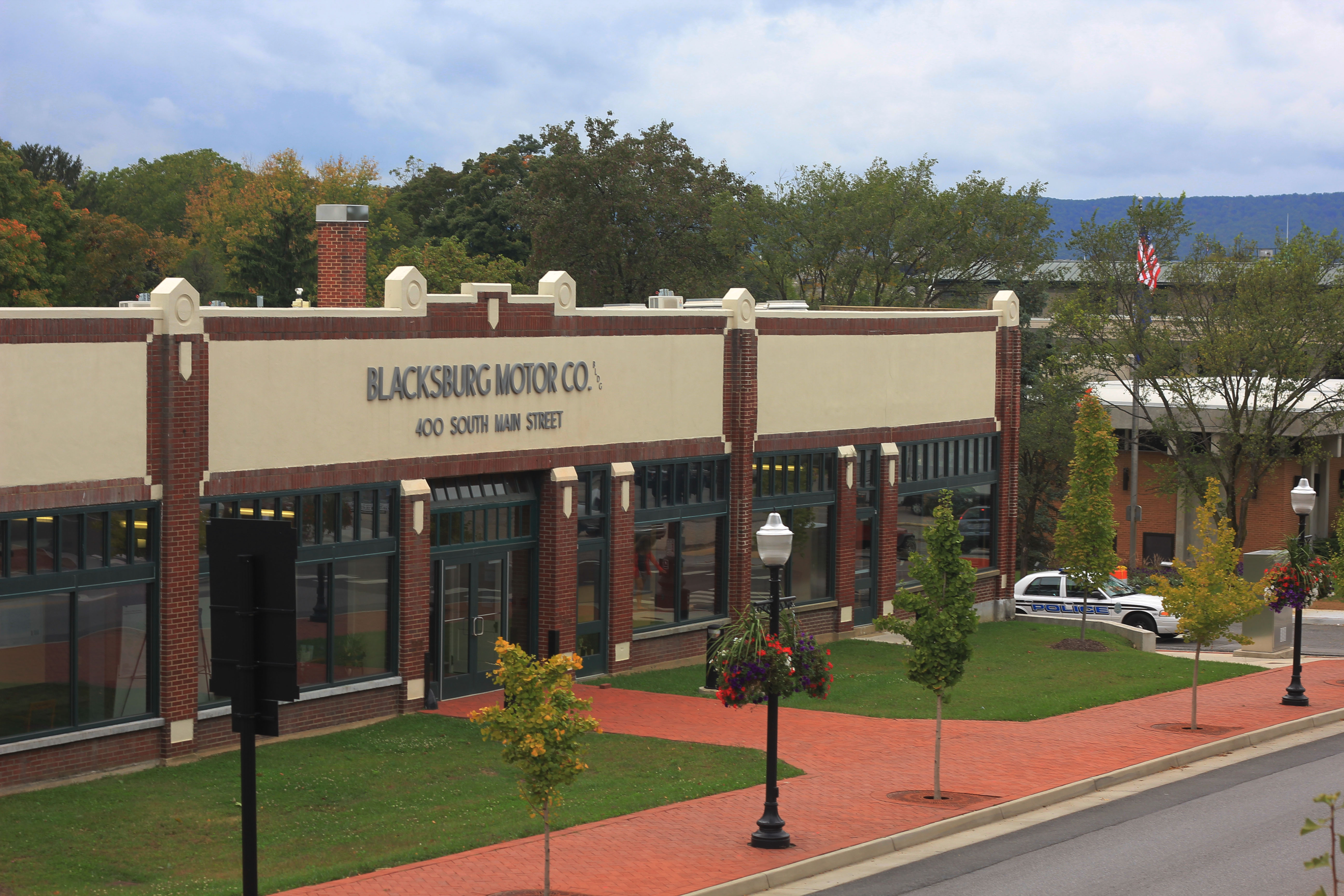
- Blacksburg Motor Company, September 2012

- Location within Virginia Location within the United States
- Location: 400 S. Main St., Blacksburg, Virginia
- Coordinates: 37°13′43″N 80°24′42″W
- Area: 1 acre (0.40 ha)
- Built: 1924
- Architectural style: Moderne, Art Deco
- NRHP reference No.: 08000074
- VLR No.: 150-0105

Significant dates
- Added to NRHP: February 21, 2008
- Designated VLR: December 5, 2007

Blacksburg Motor Company, Inc., also known as Doc Roberts Tire Co. and Heavener Chevrolet, is a historic commercial building located at Blacksburg, Montgomery County, Virginia. It was built in 1924 and expanded about 1933, and is a two-story brick and poured concrete building with only a single story visible from the front facade. It features Art Deco and Moderne design details including painted concrete details, rounded corners, and bands of windows with metal frames on the façade and tin ceilings and terrazzo floors on the interior. The building housed the first auto dealership in Blacksburg.

The building was listed on the National Register of Historic Places in 2008, and now houses the Town of Blackburg's departments of Planning and Building, and Engineering and GIS.
