= Alfred Lublin =

German internist (1895–1956)

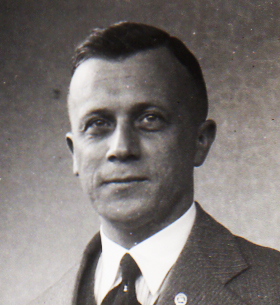
- Born: 4 May 1895; Bischofsburg, East Prussia, German Empire (now Biskupiec, Poland)
- Died: 20 August 1956 (aged 61); Sucre, Bolivia
- Known for: pancreas and diabetes
- Scientific career
- Fields: Diabetology
- Workplaces: University of Greifswald

Alfred Lublin (4 May 1895 – 20 August 1956) was a German physician, a professor at the University of Greifswald specialised in diabetes. In 1939 Lublin emigrated to Bolivia where he died in 1956,

== Biography ==
Lublin was born in Bischofsburg, East Prussia, German Empire (now Biskupiec, Poland), his father was a judge. Lublin attended the gymnasium in Königsberg (Kaliningrad) where he passed his Abitur in 1913 and began to study medicine at the University of Geneva. With the outbreak of World War I he volunteered the German Army (German Empire). He was first employed as a medical sergeant, then as a junior doctor, on the eastern front, later in the Königsberg hospital, on the Balkans and finally on the Western Front. He was awarded the Iron Cross, 1st class.

In 1916 he had passed the preliminary medical examination during a home leave in Königsberg, after demobilization in 1918 he continued his studies at the University of Halle-Wittenberg and in the same year received his doctorate with a pharmacological dissertation.

He then worked at the Königsberg fortress auxiliary hospital with war invalids and at the Pathological Institute in Königsberg. In May 1920 he received an assistant position at the University of Breslau and habilitated in 1925 with contributions to the metabolism of endogenous obesity. In 1929 he moved to the University Clinic, where he gave his inaugural lecture on newer aspects of the theory of diabetes. He became a professor in 1932 and was promoted to senior physician in April 1933. In January 1935 he asked for a leave of absence to open a practice in Königsberg. In 1939 Lublin emigrated to Bolivia. Because of the poor payment at the University of Sucre, he worked for a mining company as a doctor. He later practised in Sucre as a physician.

Lublin died in Sucre, Bolivia in 1956.

== Publications ==
"On the simultaneous use of sera and hydrastinine preparations in abdominal bleeding" (dissertation, 1918)
