= Pitts Theatre =

- U.S. National Register of Historic Places
- Virginia Landmarks Register
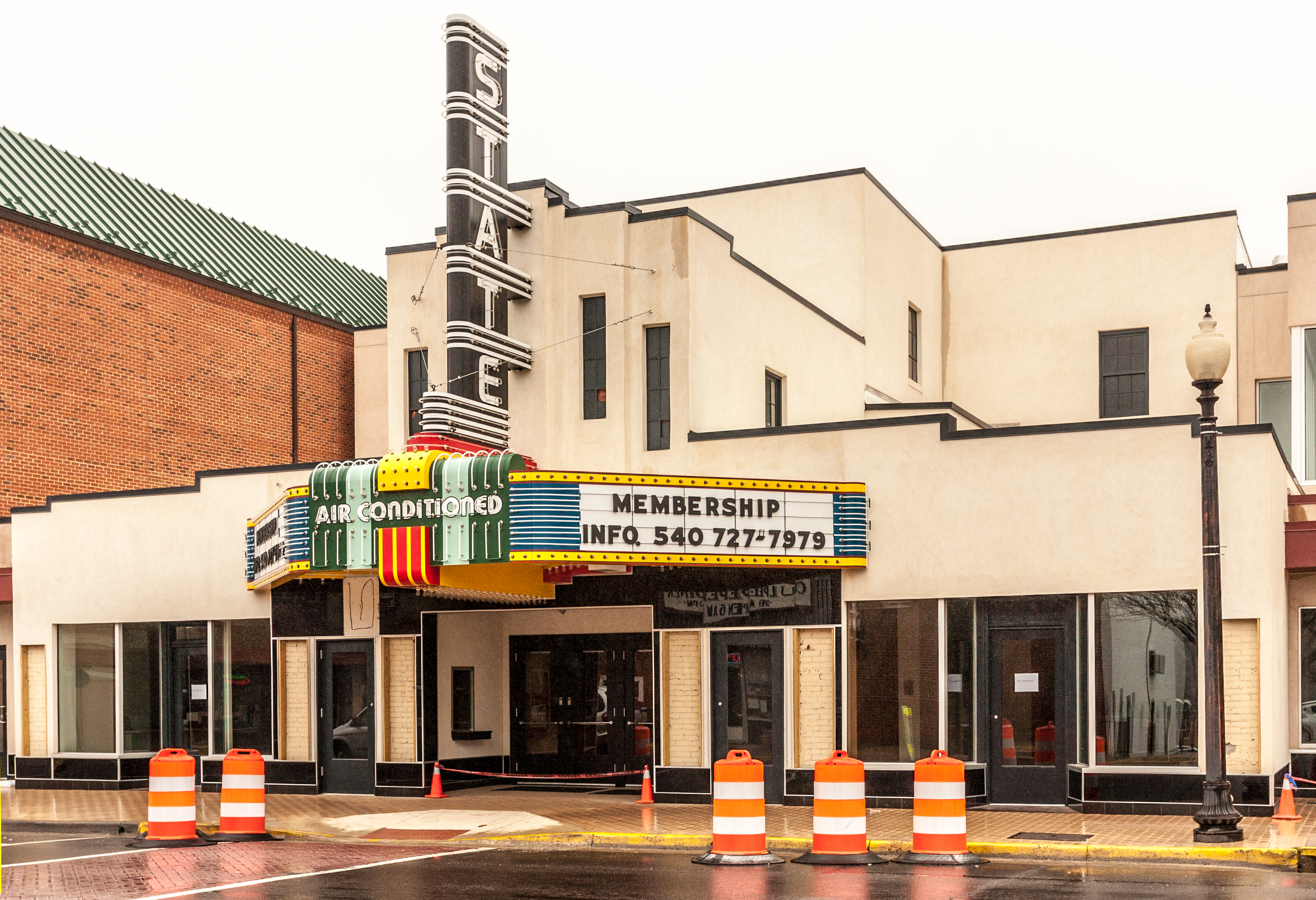
- State Theatre, March 2013

- Location within Virginia Location within the United States
- Location: 303-307 S. Main St., Culpeper, Virginia
- Coordinates: 38°28′24″N 77°59′47″W
- Area: less than one acre
- Built: 1937-1938
- Built by: Fletcher, Keith, contractor
- Architect: Ronay, Nicholas
- Architectural style: Art Deco
- Website: www.culpepertheatre.org
- NRHP reference No.: 08000420
- VLR No.: 204-5053

Significant dates
- Added to NRHP: May 15, 2008
- Designated VLR: March 20, 2008

Pitts Theatre, also known as the State Theatre after 1970, is a historic movie theater located at Culpeper, Culpeper County, Virginia. It was built in 1937–1938, and is a concrete block structure faced in brick in the Art Deco style. The building consists of a symmetrical three-bay façade, with a central theater entrance flanked by storefront retail spaces. The façade features a stepped massing that recedes from the entrance and storefronts. The interior has a sophisticated circulation system, which enabled balcony patrons, which were initially African-American, and white patrons to enter the theater separately to separate spaces; the main balcony and auditorium, respectively. The theater closed in 1992.

The theater was reopened in May 2013 with a performance by Lyle Lovett, after renovation supported by federal and state historic tax credits. The newly renovated performing arts venue's rebirth would be short lived, however. In an open letter to the Culpeper community on September 14, 2016, the State Theatre Foundation's board of directors announced that it would be ceasing operations immediately and refunding any ticket holders for upcoming performances. The letter did not give any specifics as to what would eventually become of the downtown icon, only stating "...to diligently work to decide the best course of action for the facility..." The building again sits closed to the public, as it once had for nearly twenty years, on Culpeper's Main Street.

It was listed on the National Register of Historic Places in 2008.
