= Armstrong Elementary School (Lynchburg, Virginia) =

Historic school in Virginia, US

- U.S. National Register of Historic Places
- Virginia Landmarks Register
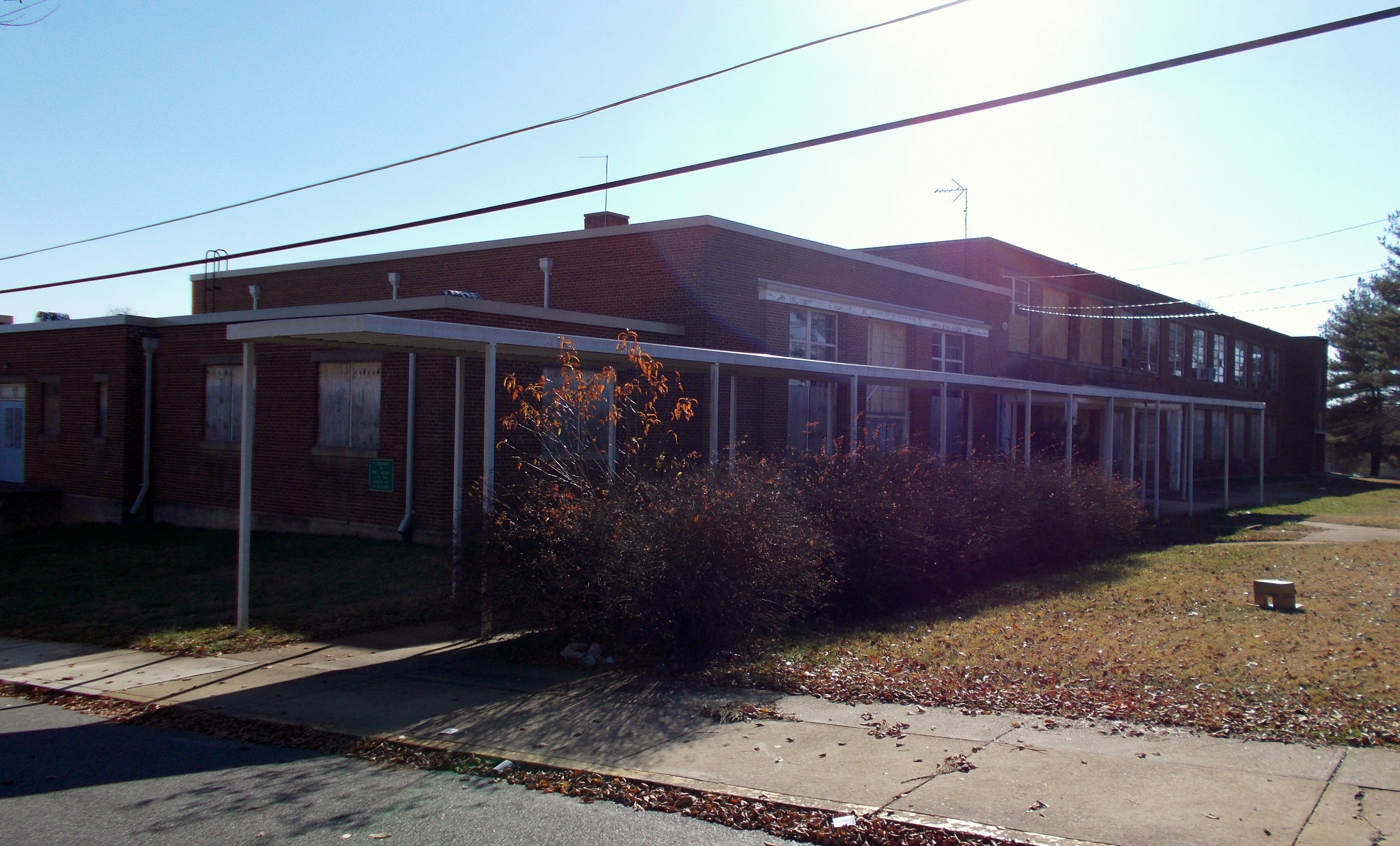
- Armstrong Elementary School, November 2012

- Location within Virginia Location within the United States
- Location: 1721 Monsview Pl., Lynchburg, Virginia
- Coordinates: 37°25′47″N 79°9′38″W
- Area: 2 acres (0.81 ha)
- Built: 1954
- Architect: Wickline, David Porter, Jr.
- Architectural style: Moderne
- NRHP reference No.: 12000542
- VLR No.: 118-5220

Significant dates
- Added to NRHP: August 22, 2012
- Designated VLR: June 21, 2012

Armstrong Elementary School is a historic elementary school for African-American students located at Lynchburg, Virginia. It opened in 1954, and consists of five sections: the two-story, 12-bay long, brick veneer classroom block; the shorter, rectangular-shaped cafetorium (combination cafeteria and auditorium) on the northeast end of the classroom block with a smaller kitchen wing; a large rectangular gymnasium on the rear; and the adjacent small boiler room. It is in the Streamline Moderne style. The property includes the site of the original school that was demolished in 1959. It was built as an equalization school prior to the Brown v. Board of Education decision that struck down racial segregation in public schools.

It was listed on the National Register of Historic Places in 2012.
