= Staunton Coca-Cola Bottling Works =

Historic building in Staunton, Virginia

Coordinates: 38°9′21″N 79°4′20″W

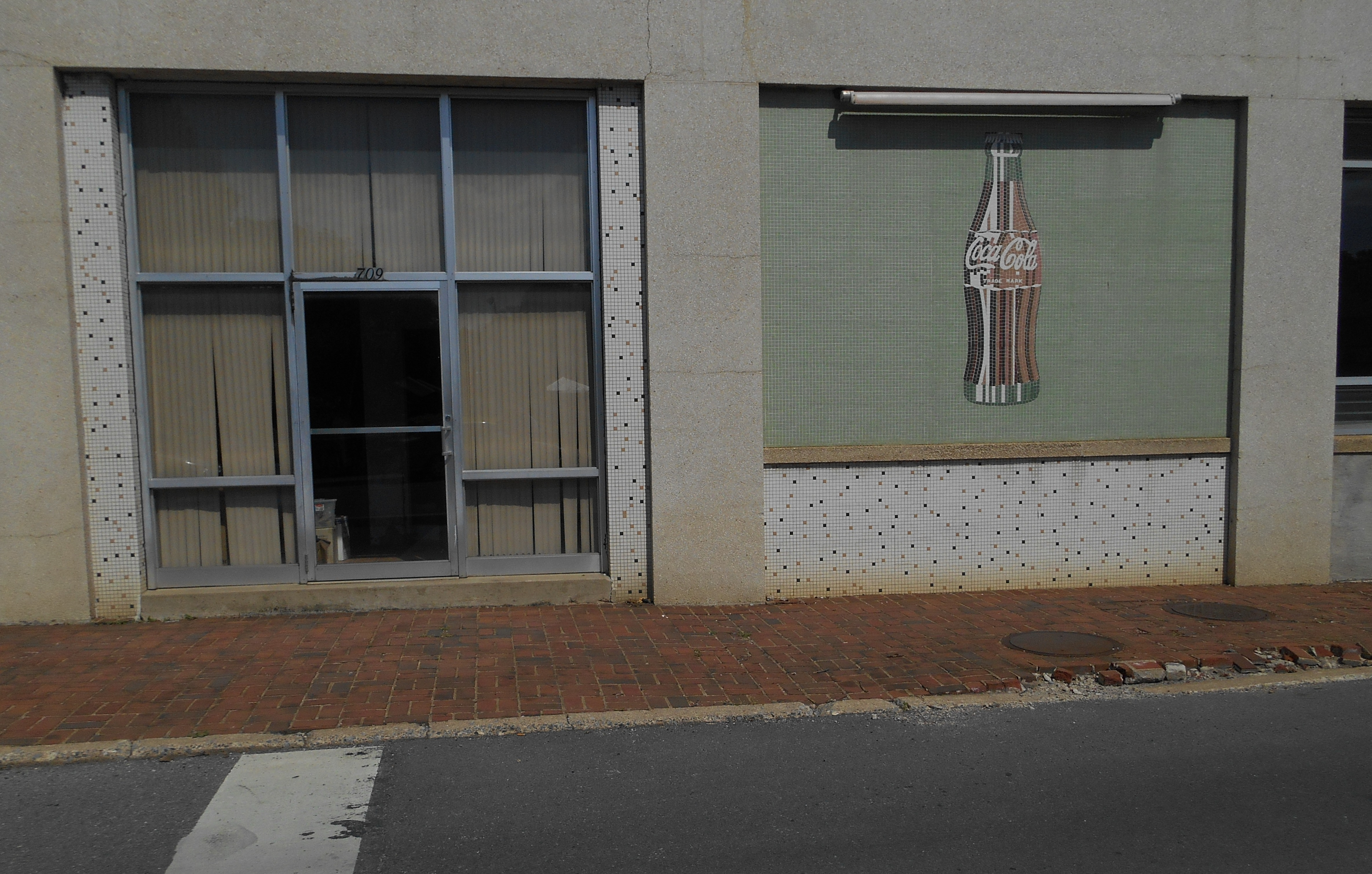
Façade of the old Coca-Cola bottling plant, Staunton, Virginia, featuring main entrance and mosaic mural

The Staunton Coca-Cola Bottling Works is a historic building in Staunton, Virginia, that formerly housed the Staunton Coca-Cola bottling plant. Originally constructed in 1927, its modernist exterior, featuring tiles in a speckled pattern (suggesting carbonation) and a mosaic image of a Coca-Cola bottle, dates from 1964. Currently vacant, the building remains a Staunton landmark, located approximately one-half mile north of Beverley Street, across from the Staunton Public Library. Its one-time president, W. L. Sams, was known as "the Coca-Cola King of the [Shenandoah] Valley." The facility moved to its present location on Christians Creek Road in the 1970s.

== Sams family ownership ==
Walter L. Sams was born in 1886 in Sandy Ridge, Georgia. He became a sales manager for Coca-Cola in Richmond in 1912, and in 1917, before serving in World War I, he married Lottie Crass, the daughter of James E. Crass (1867–1930), the owner of some 42 Coca-Cola franchises. In 1919, Sams went to work for Crass as the plant manager in Staunton. Staunton Coca-Cola Bottling Works included facilities in Staunton, Charlottesville, Harrisonburg, and Winchester, Virginia and Romney, West Virginia.

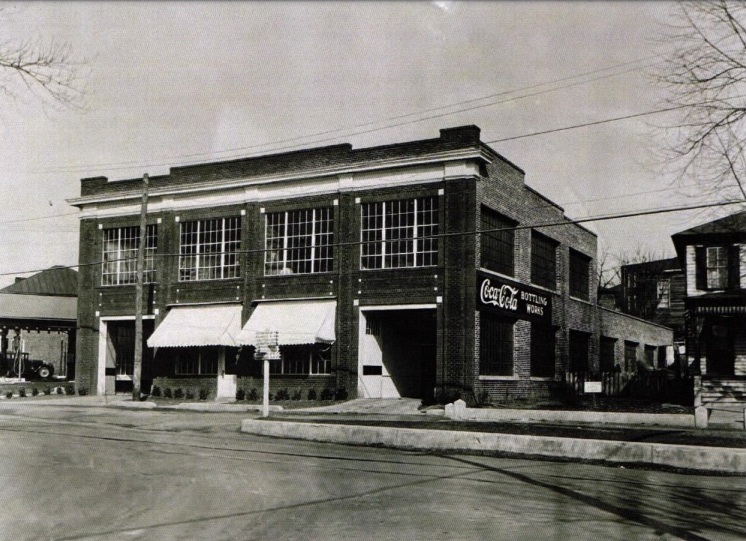
Staunton Coca-Cola Bottling Works, original building, ca. 1927 (collection: Virginia Museum of History & Culture)

W. L. and Lottie had one daughter, Betty (1922–2006), and the family moved to Richmond in 1927, where W. L. became general manager of the Crass Coca-Cola operations. Betty earned a bachelor's degree in physics from Hollins College and a Master of Social Work from Columbia University. In 1946 she married Langdon T. Christian III, of Richmond. Christian went to work for Betty's father and became president of Staunton Coca-Cola Bottling Works upon the death of W. L. in 1965.

The franchises were consolidated as the Central Coca-Cola Bottling Company of Richmond in 1981. Langdon retired in 1982 and Betty took over as president. After briefly hiring an outside candidate as president, Betty reassumed the presidency and ran the company until her retirement in 2003, ca. age 81. She and Langdon divorced in 1987, and Betty died in 2006. In February of that year the company was sold to Coca-Cola Enterprises for $102 million.

Betty Sams Christian was a benefactor of the University of Virginia men's soccer teams.

== Landmark status ==
The building was named to the Virginia Landmarks Register in May, 2024, and was listed on the National Register of Historic Places on August 19, 2024.
