= Henrico Theatre =

Historic theater in Virginia, US

- U.S. National Register of Historic Places
- Virginia Landmarks Register
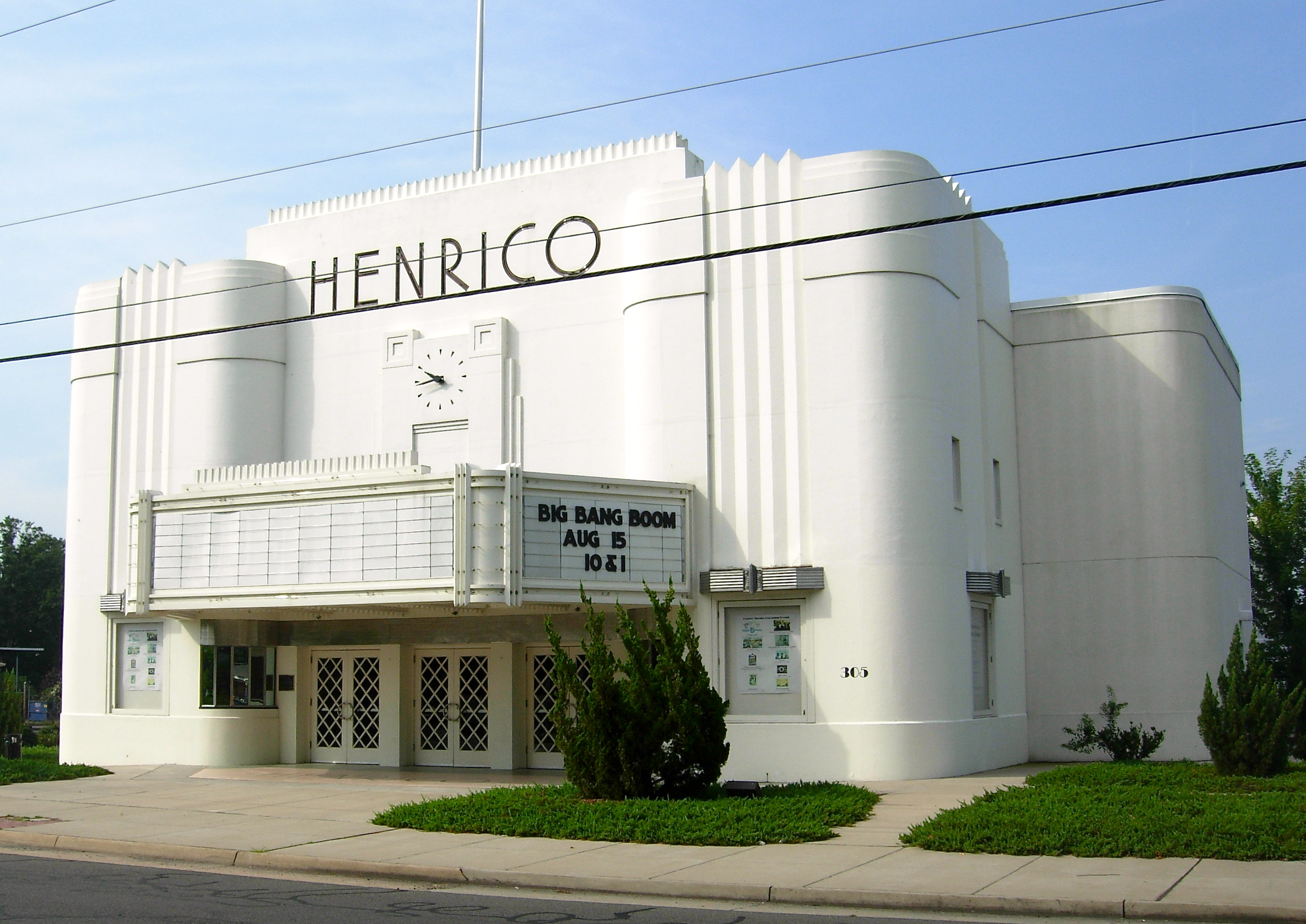

- Location within Virginia Location within the United States
- Location: 305 E. Nine Mile Rd., Highland Springs, Virginia
- Coordinates: 37°32′36.64″N 77°19′31.76″W
- Area: 1.6 acres (0.65 ha)
- Built: 1938
- Architect: Sinnott, Edward F.,
- Architectural style: Art Deco
- NRHP reference No.: 05001226
- VLR No.: 043-0287

Significant dates
- Added to NRHP: November 9, 2005
- Designated VLR: September 14, 2005

The Henrico Theatre is an historic theater building located in Henrico County, Virginia. The theater was built in 1938, and was constructed in the Art Deco style using poured concrete (a new technology at the time of construction) and brick. The building has three bays, of which the centermost is recessed. That central bay features the theater's name in large stylized letters, the building's original marquee, and a clock designed to echo the shape of the building and created by the International Business Machine Corporation (later IBM). The auditorium initially sat 782; its capacity was reduced to 400 after a renovation.

== History ==
The theater opened on April 25, 1938, with a showing of "Thin Ice", starring Sonja Henie. One of the business's two owners had previously built the Byrd Theatre in nearby Richmond. The theater had been built with the most modern amenities, including air conditioning and high tech lighting and projection systems, despite its rural location at the time of construction. It was well received by the public, with its architecture in particular praised as some of the best recent work in the Richmond area.

The theater is one of only two surviving significant Art Deco structures in Henrico County. The business closed in 1996, but was purchased by Henrico County in 1999 and underwent a $5.8 million restoration. The property was listed on the National Register of Historic Places in 2005, and reopened in 2007 as a multi-use community facility.
