= List of census-designated places in Virginia =

Map of the United States with Virginia highlighted

This is a list of census-designated places in the U.S. state of Virginia

Census-designated places (CDPs) are unincorporated communities lacking elected municipal officers and boundaries with legal status. The term "census designated place" has been used as an official classification by the U.S. Census Bureau since 1980. Prior to that, select unincorporated communities were surveyed in the U.S. Census.

== Census-designated places in Virginia ==
CDP	County	Location of County	Population (2020)	Population (2010)	Population (2000)	Population (1990)	Population (1980)	Notes
Abbs Valley	Tazewell		209	x	x	x	x	
Adwolf	Smyth		1,658	1,530	1,457	x	x	
Afton	Albemarle; Nelson		313	x	x	x	x	
Aldie	Loudoun		70	x	x	x	x	
Allison Gap	Smyth		610	x	x	x	x	Listed as an unincorporated community in the 1950 U.S. census (pop 1,015)
Allisonia	Pulaski		111	117	x	x	x	
Amelia Court House	Amelia		965	1,099				
Amonate	Tazewell		59	x	x	x	x	
Annandale	Fairfax		43,363	41,008	54,994	50,975	49,524	
Apple Mountain Lake	Warren		1,400	1,396				
Aquia Harbour	Stafford		6,836	6,727				
Arcola	Loudoun		2,412	233				
Arlington	Arlington		238,643	207,627	189,453	170,936	152,599	Coterminous with Arlington County which has no incorporated communities and is treated as both a census designated place and as a county by the U.S. Census Bureau.
Arrington	Nelson		718	708				
Ashburn	Loudoun		46,349	43,511	x	3,393		Deleted prior to the 2000 United States census; relisted in the 2010 United States census
Atkins	Smyth		1,121	1,143	1,138			
Atlantic	Accomack		808	862	x	x	x	
Augusta Springs	Augusta		236	257				
Austinville	Wythe		119	x	x	x	x	
Bailey's Crossroads	Fairfax		24,749	23,643	23,166	19,507	12,564	
Barboursville	Orange		177	x	x	x	x	
Baskerville	Mecklenburg		120	128				
Bassett	Henry		1,028	1,100	1,338			
Bastian	Bland		343	x	x	x	x	
Basye	Shenandoah		1,374	1,253	986	x	x	Basye-Bryce Mountain CDP in the 2000 U.S. census
Bayside	Accomack		107	120	x	x	x	
Baywood	Grayson		414	x	x	x	x	
Bealeton	Fauquier		5,882	4,435				
Belle Haven	Fairfax		6,851	6,518	6,269	6,427	6,520	
Bellwood	Chesterfield		7,678	6,352	5,974	x	x	
Belmont	Loudoun		10,268	5,966				
Belmont Estates	Rockingham		1,263	1,263				
Belspring	Pulaski		204	256	176			
Belview	Montgomery		1,128	891				
Benns Church	Isle of Wight		1,453	872				
Bensley	Chesterfield		5,971	5,819	5,435			
Bethel Manor	York		4,540	3,792				
Big Island	Bedford		300	303				
Big Rock	Buchanan		199	x	x	x	x	
Big Stone Gap East	Wise		687	x	x	x	x	
Blairs	Pittsylvania		841	916				
Bland	Bland		383	409				
Blue Ridge	Botetourt		3,185	3,084	3,188			
Blue Ridge Shores	Louisa		801	813				
Bobtown	Accomack		267	211	x	x	x	
Boissevain	Tazewell		457	x	x	x	x	
Bon Air	Chesterfield		18,022	16,366	16,213	16,423	16,224	
Boston	Accomack		454	504	x	x	x	
Boswell's Corner	Stafford		1,656	1,375				
Bracey	Mecklenburg		1,372	1,554				
Braddock	Fairfax		6,549	x	x	x	x	
Brambleton	Loudoun		23,486	9,845				
Brandermill	Chesterfield		13,730	13,173				
Brandy Station	Culpeper		191	x	x	x	x	
Breaks	Buchanan; Dickenson		144	x	x	x	x	
Brightwood	Madison		1,064	1,001				
Broadlands	Loudoun		14,021	12,313				
Brucetown	Frederick		274	x	x	x	x	
Buckhall	Prince William		20,420	16,293				
Buckingham Courthouse	Buckingham		129	133				
Bull Run	Fairfax		6,972	x	x	x	x	
Bull Run	Prince William		16,794	14,983				
Bull Run Mountain Estates	Prince William		1,220	1,261				
Burke	Fairfax		42,312	41,055	57,737	57,734	33,835	
Burke Centre	Fairfax		17,518	17,326	x	x	x	
Callaghan	Alleghany		203	348				
Calverton	Fauquier		279	239				
Camp Barrett	Stafford		1,140	x	x	x	x	
Camptown	Isle of Wight		718	766				
Cana	Carroll		1,243	1,254	1,228	x	x	
Captains Cove	Accomack		1,544	1,042	x	x	x	
Carrollton	Isle of Wight		7,498	4,574				
Carrsville	Isle of Wight		346	359				
Cascades	Loudoun		12,366	11,912				
Castlewood	Russell		1,704	2,045	2,036			
Catlett	Fauquier		331	297				
Cats Bridge	Accomack		184	229	x	x	x	
Cave Spring	Roanoke		26,755	24,922				
Central Garage	King William		1,810	1,318				
Centreville	Fairfax		73,518	71,135	49,789	26,585	7,473	
Chamberlayne	Henrico		5,581	5,456	4,380	4,577	5,136	
Chantilly	Fairfax		24,301	23,039	41,041	29,337	12,259	
Charles City	Charles City		104	133				
Chase Crossing	Accomack		335	377	x	x	x	
Chatmoss	Henry		1,671	1,698	1,742	x	x	
Cherry Hill	Prince William		23,683	16,000				
Chester	Chesterfield		23,414	20,987	17,890			
Chester Gap	Rappahannock; Warren		894	839				
Churchville	Augusta		195	194				
Claypool Hill	Tazewell		1,699	1,776	1,719			
Cliftondale Park	Alleghany		266	x	x	x	x	
Clover	Halifax		366	438				
Cloverdale	Botetourt		3,410	3,119	2,986			
Cluster Springs	Halifax		718	811				
Collinsville	Henry		7,380	7,335	7,777			
Columbia	Fluvanna		72	83	49	58	111	
Concord	Appomattox; Campbell		1,557	1,458				
Countryside	Loudoun		10,418	10,072				
County Center	Prince William		4,045	3,270				
Crimora	Augusta		2,219	2,209	1,796			
Crosspointe	Fairfax		5,722	5,802	x	x	x	
Crozet	Albemarle		9,224	5,565	2,820			
Cumberland	Cumberland		365	393				
Dahlgren	King George		2,946	2,653	997	x	x	
Dahlgren Center	King George		724	599				
Dale City	Prince William		72,088	65,969				
Daleville	Botetourt		3,070	2,557	1,454			
Dante	Dickenson; Russell		572	649				
Deep Creek	Accomack		94	115	x	x	x	
Deerfield	Augusta		110	132				
Deltaville	Middlesex		1,057	1,119				
Difficult Run	Fairfax		10,600	x	x	x	x	
Dinwiddie	Dinwiddie		619	x	x	x	x	
Disputanta	Prince George		373	x	x	x	x	
Dooms	Augusta		1,279	1,327	1,282			
Doran	Tazewell		113	x	x	x	x	
Dranesville	Fairfax		11,785	11,921	x	x	x	
Draper	Pulaski		291	320				
Dryden	Lee		986	1,208	1,253	x	x	
Dulles Town Center	Loudoun		5,909	4,601				
Dumbarton	Henrico		8,506	7,879	6,674	8,526	8,149	
Dunbar	Wise		79	x	x	x	x	
Dunn Loring	Fairfax		9,464	8,803	7,861			
Eagle Rock	Botetourt		209	x	x	x	x	
Earlysville	Albemarle		1,153	x	x	x	x	
East Highland Park	Henrico		15,131	14,796	12,488	11,850	11,797	
East Lexington	Rockbridge		1,824	1,463				
East Stone Gap	Wise		537	x	x	x	x	
Ebony	Brunswick		150	161				
Eggleston	Giles		143	x	x	x	x	
Elliston	Montgomery		855	902				
Emory	Washington		1,237	1,251				
Enon	Chesterfield		4,075	3,466	3,097	2,693		
Esmont	Albemarle		491	528				
Ettrick	Chesterfield		7,241	6,682	5,627	5,290	4,890	
Ewing	Lee		381	439	436	x	x	
Fair Lakes	Fairfax		8,404	7,942	x	x	x	
Fair Oaks	Fairfax		34,052	30,223	x	x	x	
Fairfax Station	Fairfax		12,420	12,030	x	x	x	
Fairfield	Rockbridge		257	x	x	x	x	
Fairlawn	Pulaski		2,419	2,367				
Fairview Beach	King George		376	391	230	x	x	
Fairview	Mecklenburg		237	240				
Falls Mills	Tazewell		305	x	x	x	x	
Falmouth	Stafford		4,956	4,274	3,624			
Fancy Gap	Carroll		214	237	260	x	x	
Ferrum	Franklin		1,827	2,043	1,313			
Fieldale	Henry		852	879	929			
Fishersville	Augusta		9,629	7,462	4,998			
Flint Hill	Rappahannock		222	209				
Floris	Fairfax		8,341	8,375	x	x	x	
Forest	Bedford		11,709	9,106	8,006			
Fort Belvoir	Fairfax		7,637	7,100				
Fort Chiswell	Wythe		876	939	911	x	x	
Fort Hunt	Fairfax		17,231	16,045	12,923			
Fort Gregg-Adams	Prince George		9,874	3,393	7,269			
Franconia	Fairfax		18,943	18,245	31,907			
Franklin Farm	Fairfax		19,189	19,288	x	x	x	
Franktown	Northampton		61	x	x	x	x	
Free Union	Albemarle		187	193				
Gainesville	Prince William		17,287	11,481	4,383	x	x	
Gargatha	Accomack		415	381	x	x	x	
Gasburg	Brunswick		408	481				
George Mason	Fairfax		11,162	9,496	x	x	x	
Glen Allen	Henrico		16,187	14,774	12,562	9,010	6,202	
Glen Wilton	Botetourt		129	x	x	x	x	
Glenvar	Roanoke		892	976				
Gloucester Courthouse	Gloucester		3,030	2,951	2,269			
Gloucester Point	Gloucester		10,587	9,402	9,429			
Goochland	Goochland		899	861				
Goose Creek Village	Loudoun		2,298	x	x	x	x	
Gore	Frederick		249	x	x	x	x	
Gratton	Tazewell		865	937				
Great Falls	Fairfax		15,953	15,427	8,549	6,945		
Great Falls Crossing	Fairfax		1,392	x	x	x	x	
Greenbackville	Accomack		173	192	x	x	x	
Greenbriar	Fairfax		8,421	8,166	x	x	x	
Greenbush	Accomack		224	220	x	x	x	
Greenville	Augusta		887	832	886	x	x	
Groveton	Fairfax		15,725	14,598	21,296			
Gwynn	Mathews		578	602				
Hampden-Sydney	Prince Edward		1,191	1,450				
Hanover	Hanover		235	252				
Harborton	Accomack		130	131	x	x	x	
Harriston	Augusta		948	909				
Hayfield	Fairfax		4,154	3,909	x	x	x	
Heathsville	Northumberland		136	142	142	127	185	
Henry Fork	Franklin		1,120	1,234				
Highland Springs	Henrico		16,604	15,711	15,137	13,823	12,146	
Hilltown	Carroll; Grayson		216	x	x	x	x	
Hiltons	Scott		334	x	x	x	x	
Hiwassee	Pulaski		212	264				
Hollins	Botetourt; Roanoke		15,574	14,673	14,309			
Hollymead	Albemarle		8,601	7,690				
Horntown	Accomack		912	574	x	x	x	
Horse Pasture	Henry		2,058	2,227				
Hot Springs	Bath		524	738				
Huntington	Fairfax		13,749	11,267				
Hutchison	Fairfax		6,231	x	x	x	x	
Hybla Valley	Fairfax		16,319	15,801	16,721	15,491	15,533	
Idylwood	Fairfax		17,954	17,288	16,005	14,710	11,982	
Independent Hill	Prince William		10,165	7,419				
Innovation	Prince William		926	x	x	x	x	
Innsbrook	Henrico		8,998	7,753				
Ivanhoe	Wythe		501	551				
Ivy	Albemarle		917	905				
Jewell Ridge	Tazewell		149	x	x	x	x	
Jolivue	Augusta		1,168	1,129	1,037			
Keezletown	Rockingham		369	x	x	x	x	
Keokee	Lee		330	416	316	x	x	
Keswick	Albemarle		321	x	x	x	x	
Kincora	Loudoun		367	x	x	x	x	
King George	King George		4,970	4,457				
King William	King William		276	252				
King and Queen Court House	King and Queen		82	85				
Kings Park	Fairfax		4,537	4,333	x	x	x	
Kings Park West	Fairfax		13,465	13,390	x	x	x	
Kingstowne	Fairfax		16,825	15,556	x	x	x	
Lafayette	Montgomery		429	449				
Lake Barcroft	Fairfax		9,770	9,558	8,906			
Lake Caroline	Caroline		2,511	2,260				
Lake Holiday	Frederick		2,196	1,905				
Lake Land'Or	Caroline		4,555	4,223				
Lake Monticello	Fluvanna		10,126	9,920	6,852			
Lake Ridge	Prince William		46,162	41,058	30,404			
Lake Wilderness	Spotsylvania		2,960	2,669				
Lake of the Woods	Orange		8,081	7,177				
Lakeside	Henrico		12,203	11,849	11,157	12,081	12,289	
Lancaster	Lancaster		105	x	x	x	x	
Lansdowne	Loudoun		12,427	11,253				
Laurel	Henrico		17,769	16,713	14,875	13,011	10,569	
Laurel Hill	Fairfax		8,307	6,855	x	x	x	
Laurel Park	Henry		657	675	781	x	x	
Laymantown	Botetourt		1,867	1,979	2,034			
Lee Mont	Accomack		102	125	x	x	x	
Leesylvania	Prince William		21,193	12,068				
Lincolnia	Fairfax		22,922	22,828	15,788	13,041	10,350	
Linton Hall	Prince William		41,754	35,725	8,620	x	x	
Linville	Rockingham		355	x	x	x	x	
Loch Lomond	Prince William		4,050	3,701	3,411			
Locust Mount	Accomack		52	x	x	x	x	
Long Branch	Fairfax		7,890	7,593	x	x	x	
Lorton	Fairfax		20,072	18,610	17,786	x	x	
Loudoun Valley Estates	Loudoun		11,436	3,656				
Lovingston	Nelson		503	520				
Low Moor	Alleghany		402	258	367	x	x	
Lowes Island	Loudoun		11,023	10,756				
Lunenburg	Lunenburg		142	165				
Lyndhurst	Augusta		1,554	1,490	1,527	x	x	
Madison Heights	Amherst		10,893	11,285	11,584			
Makemie Park	Accomack		138	155	x	x	x	
Mallow	Alleghany		671	x	x	x	x	
Manchester	Chesterfield		12,129	10,804				
Mantua	Fairfax		7,503	7,135	7,485	6,804		
Mappsburg	Accomack		51	60	x	x	x	
Mappsville	Accomack		311	440	x	x	x	
Marshall	Fauquier		1,854	1,480				
Mason Neck	Fairfax		2,025	2,005	x	x	x	
Massanetta Springs	Rockingham		6,384	4,833				
Massanutten	Rockingham		2,164	2,291	1,945			
Mathews	Mathews		525	555				
Matoaca	Chesterfield		2,655	2,403	2,273	x	x	
Maurertown	Shenandoah		973	770				
Max Meadows	Wythe		553	562	512	x	x	
McDowell	Highland		94	x	x	x	x	
McGaheysville	Rockingham		978	x	x	x	x	
McLean	Fairfax		50,773	48,115	38,929	38,168	35,664	
McMullin	Smyth		455	464				
McNair	Fairfax		21,598	17,513	x	x	x	
Meadowbrook	Chesterfield		20,898	18,312				
Meadows of Dan	Patrick		72	x	x	x	x	
Meadowview	Washington		861	967				
Mechanicsburg	Bland		81	x	x	x	x	
Mechanicsville	Hanover		39,482	36,348	30,464	22,027	9,269	
Mendota	Washington		135	x	x	x	x	
Merrifield	Fairfax		20,488	15,212	11,170			
Merrimac	Montgomery		2,858	2,133	1,751			
Metompkin	Accomack		490	551	x	x	x	
Middlebrook	Augusta		184	213				
Midland	Fauquier		214	218				
Midlothian	Chesterfield		18,320	x	x	x	x	
Millboro	Bath		236	x	x	x	x	
Modest Town	Accomack		120	149	x	x	x	
Moneta	Bedford		450	x	x	x	x	
Montclair	Prince William		22,279	19,570	15,728			
Montrose	Henrico		7,909	7,993	7,018	6,405	5,349	
Montvale	Bedford		635	698				
Moorefield	Loudoun		4,421	77	x	x	x	
Motley	Pittsylvania		825	1,015				
Mount Clifton	Shenandoah		110					
Mount Hermon	Pittsylvania			3,966				
Mount Sidney	Augusta			663				
Mount Vernon	Fairfax		12,914	12,416				
Mountain Road	Halifax			1,100				
Nathalie	Halifax							
Navy	Fairfax		4,327	x	x	x	x	
Nellysford	Nelson							
Nelsonia	Accomack		451	523	x	x	x	
New Baltimore	Fauquier		11,251	8,119				
New Church	Accomack		256	205	x	x	x	
New Hope	Augusta							
New Kent	New Kent		739					
New River	Pulaski							
Newington	Fairfax		13,223	12,943				
Newington Forest	Fairfax		12,957	12,442	x	x	x	
Nokesville	Prince William		1,619			x	x	
North Garden	Albemarle		461					
North Shore	Franklin		3,332			x	x	
North Springfield	Fairfax		7,430	7,274				
Nottoway Court House	Nottoway		63	84				
Oak Grove	Loudoun							
Oak Hall	Accomack		226	255	x	x	x	
Oak Level	Henry					x	x	
Oakton	Fairfax		36,732					
One Loudoun	Loudoun		2,285					
Opal	Fauquier							
Osaka	Wise		132					
Palmyra	Fluvanna							
Pantops	Albemarle		4,682	3,027				
Paris	Fauquier							
Parrott	Pulaski							
Passapatanzy	King George							
Pastoria	Accomack		627	649	x	x	x	
Patrick Springs	Patrick					x	x	
Penhook	Franklin					x	x	
Pimmit Hills	Fairfax		6,569					
Piney Mountain	Albemarle							
Plum Creek	Montgomery							
Port Republic	Rockingham							
Potomac Mills	Prince William		6,332	5,614				
Pounding Mill	Tazewell		367					
Powhatan	Powhatan							
Prices Fork	Montgomery							
Prince George	Prince George		2,315					
Pungoteague	Accomack		346	347	x	x	x	
Quantico Base	Prince William Stafford		5,221	4,452				
Quinby	Accomack		285	282	x	x	x	
Raven	Russell; Tazewell							
Ravensworth	Fairfax		2,680	2,466	x	x	x	
Rectortown	Fauquier							
Reston	Fairfax		63,226	58,404				
Riner	Montgomery		1,196					
Rio	Albemarle		2,076					
Ripplemead	Giles							
Rivanna	Albemarle		2,174	1,860				
Riverdale	Halifax							
Riverview	Wise							
Rockwood	Chesterfield		8,685	8,431				
Rocky Gap	Bland							
Rose Hill	Fairfax		21,045	20,226				
Rose Hill	Lee		729	799	714	x	x	
Ruckersville	Greene		1,321	1,141				
Rushmere	Isle of Wight							
Rustburg	Campbell		1,585	1,431		x	x	
Saluda	Middlesex		627	769				
Sandston	Henrico		7,779	7,571				
Sandy Level	Henry		464	484	689	x	x	
Sanford	Accomack		168	212	x	x	x	
Savage Town	Accomack		72	78	x	x	x	
Savageville	Accomack		175	175	x	x	x	
Schooner Bay	Accomack		97	x	x	x	x	
Schuyler	Nelson							
Scotland	Surry							
Sedley	Southampton							
Selma	Alleghany					x	x	
Seven Corners	Fairfax		9,131	9,255				
Seven Mile Ford	Smyth							
Shawneeland	Frederick							
Shawsville	Montgomery							
Shenandoah Farms	Warren							
Shenandoah Retreat	Clarke							
Shenandoah Shores	Warren							
Sherando	Augusta					x	x	
Shipman	Nelson							
Short Pump	Henrico		30,626	24,729		x	x	
Singers Glen	Rockingham							
Skyland Estates	Warren							
Snowville	Pulaski							
South Riding	Loudoun		33,877	24,256				
South Run	Fairfax		6,462	6,389	x	x	x	
Southampton Meadows	Southampton							
Southern Gateway	Stafford							
Southside Chesconessex	Accomack		115	131	x	x	x	
Sperryville	Rappahannock							
Spotsylvania Courthouse	Spotsylvania		5,610	4,239				
Springfield	Fairfax		31,339	30,484				
Springville	Tazewell							
St. Charles	Lee		72					
Stafford Courthouse	Stafford		5,370					
Stanleytown	Henry							
Sterling	Loudoun		30,337	27,822				
Stevens Creek	Grayson		240					
Stewartsville	Bedford		533					
Stickleyville	Lee							
Stone Ridge	Loudoun		15,039	7,214				
Stonega	Wise		93					
Stuarts Draft	Augusta		12,142	9,235				
Sudley	Prince William		19,008	16,203	7,719			
Sugar Grove	Smyth		610			x	x	
Sugarland Run	Loudoun		12,956	11,799				
Sully Square	Fairfax		2,300	x	x	x	x	
Sussex	Sussex		10,829	12,087				
Tacoma	Wise		204					
Tasley	Accomack		222	300	x	x	x	
Temperanceville	Accomack		308	358	x	x	x	
Templeton	Prince George							
The University of Virginia's College at Wise	Wise							
Thynedale	Mecklenburg							
Timberlake	Campbell		13,267	12,183				
Triangle	Prince William		9,589	8,188				
Tuckahoe	Henrico		48,051	44,990	43,242			
Twin Lakes	Greene							
Tysons	Fairfax		26,374	19,627	18,540			
Union Hall	Franklin					x	x	
Union Level	Mecklenburg							
Union Mill	Fairfax		4,997	x	x	x	x	
University Center	Loudoun							
University of Virginia	Charlottesville (IC)		7,909	7,704				
Upperville	Fauquier							
Vansant	Buchanan							
Verona	Augusta		4,398	4,239	3,368			
Villa Heights	Henry							
Wakefield	Fairfax		11,805	11,805	x	x	x	
Warfield	Brunswick							
Warm Springs	Bath		121					
Waterford	Loudoun							
Wattsville	Accomack		1,341	1,128	x	x	x	
Weems	Lancaster							
West Falls Church	Fairfax		30,243	29,207				
West Springfield	Fairfax		23,369	22,460				
Westlake Corner	Franklin		1,553	976		x	x	
Weyers Cave	Augusta		2,700			x	x	
Whitesville	Accomack		215	219	x	x	x	
Willis Wharf	Northampton		210					
Wintergreen	Augusta; Nelson		413	165				
Wolf Trap	Fairfax		16,496	16,131				
Woodbridge	Prince William		44,668	40,550	31,941	26,401	24,004	
Woodburn	Fairfax		8,797	8,480	x	x	x	
Woodlake	Chesterfield		4,793	4,319				
Woodlawn	Carroll		2,045			x	x	
Woodlawn	Fairfax		20,859	20,804	x	x	x	
Wyndham	Henrico		11,087	9,785		x	x	
Yogaville	Buckingham							
Yorkshire	Prince William		10,992					
Yorktown	York		221	195	203	x	x	

== Former census-designated places in Virginia ==
CDP	County	Location of County	Population (2020)	Population (2010)	Population (2000)	Population (1990)	Population (1980)	Notes
Barracks	Albemarle		x	x	x	4,710	x	Formed in the 1990 United States census; deleted prior to the 2000 United States census.
Commonwealth	Albemarle		x	x	x			Deleted prior to the 2000 United States census.
Hessian Hills	Albemarle		x	x	x	x		Deleted and merged into Barracks CDP prior to the 1990 United States census.
Hollymead	Albemarle		x	x	x			Deleted prior to the 2000 United States census.
Rio	Albemarle		x	x	x			Deleted prior to the 2000 United States census.
University Heights	Albemarle		x	x	x			Deleted prior to the 2000 United States census.
Vint Hill Farms Station	Fauquier		x	x	x			Deleted prior to the 2000 United States census.
Chatmoss-Laurel Park	Henry		x	x	x			Split into the Chatmoss CDP and Laurel Park CDP prior to the 2000 United States census.
Countryside	Loudoun		x	x	x			Deleted prior to the 2000 United States census.
Sterling	Loudoun		x	x	x			Deleted prior to the 2000 United States census.
Sugarland Run	Loudoun		x	x	x			Deleted prior to the 2000 United States census.
