= List of unincorporated communities in Virginia =

This is a list of unincorporated communities in the Commonwealth of Virginia that are not incorporated as independent cities or towns as of 2005. Bolded places are census-designated places; there are 362 of them as of the 2010 United States census.

== A ==
- **Abbs Valley** (Tazewell County)
- **Adwolf** (Smyth County)
- **Afton** (Albemarle County and Nelson County)
- **Aldie** (Loudoun County)
- **Allison Gap** (Smyth County)
- **Allisonia** (Pulaski County)
- Alton (Halifax County)
- **Amelia Court House** (Amelia County)
- **Amonate** (Tazewell County)
- **Annandale** (Fairfax County)
- **Apple Mountain Lake** (Warren County)
- **Aquia Harbour** (Stafford County)
- **Arcola** (Loudoun County)
- **Arlington** (Arlington County) (Note: Arlington is the name of the county and the CDP; the CDP is coterminous with Arlington County.)
- **Arrington** (Nelson County)
- **Ashburn** (Loudoun County)
- **Atkins** (Smyth County)
- **Atlantic** (Accomack County)
- Atlee (Hanover County)
- **Augusta Springs** (Augusta County)
- **Austinville** (Wythe County)

== B ==
- **Bailey's Crossroads** (Fairfax County)
- Ballston (Arlington County)
- **Barboursville** (Orange County)
- **Baskerville** (Mecklenburg County)
- **Bassett** (Henry County)
- **Basye** (Shenandoah County)
- **Bayside** (Accomack County)
- Bayview (Northampton County)
- **Baywood** (Grayson County)
- Beach (Chesterfield County)
- **Bealeton** (Fauquier County)
- **Belle Haven** (Fairfax County)
- **Bellwood** (Chesterfield County)
- **Belmont** (Loudoun County)
- **Belmont Estates** (Rockingham County)
- **Belspring** (Pulaski County)
- **Belview** (Montgomery County)
- **Benns Church** (Isle of Wight County)
- **Bensley** (Chesterfield County)
- Bermuda Hundred (Chesterfield County)
- **Bethel Manor** (York County)
- **Big Island** (Bedford County)
- **Blairs** (Pittsylvania County)
- **Bland** (Bland County)
- **Blue Ridge** (Botetourt County)
- **Blue Ridge Shores** (Louisa County)
- **Bobtown** (Accomack County)
- **Bon Air** (Chesterfield County)
- **Boston** (Accomack County)
- **Boswell's Corner** (Stafford County)
- **Bracey** (Mecklenburg County)
- **Brambleton** (Loudoun County)
- **Brandermill** (Chesterfield County)
- **Brightwood** (Madison County)
- Bristow (Prince William County)
- **Broadlands** (Loudoun County)
- Brownsburg (Rockbridge County)
- **Buckhall** (Prince William County)
- **Buckingham** (Buckingham County)
- **Bull Run** (Prince William County)
- **Bull Run Mountain Estates** (Prince William County)
- Bumpass (Louisa County)
- **Burke** (Fairfax County)
- **Burke Centre** (Fairfax County)

== C ==
- **Callaghan** (Alleghany County)
- Callands (Pittsylvania County)
- **Calverton** (Fauquier County)
- **Camptown** (Isle of Wight County)
- **Cana** (Carroll County)
- **Captains Cove** (Accomack County)
- **Carrollton** (Isle of Wight County)
- **Carrsville** (Isle of Wight County)
- **Cascades** (Loudoun County)
- **Castlewood** (Russell County)
- **Catlett** (Fauquier County)
- **Cats Bridge** (Accomack County)
- **Cave Spring** (Roanoke County)
- **Central Garage** (King William County)
- Centralia (Chesterfield County)
- **Centreville** (Fairfax County)
- **Chamberlayne** (Henrico County)
- Champlain (Essex County)
- **Chantilly** (Fairfax County)
- **Charles City** (Charles City County)
- **Chase Crossing** (Accomack County)
- **Chatmoss** (Henry County)
- **Cherry Hill** (Prince William County)
- **Chester** (Chesterfield County)
- **Chester Gap** (Rappahannock County and Warren County)
- **Chesterfield** (Chesterfield County)
- Church Road (Dinwiddie County)
- **Churchville** (Augusta County)
- Cismont (Albemarle County)
- Clarendon (Arlington County)
- **Claypool Hill** (Tazewell County)
- **Clover** (Halifax County)
- **Cloverdale** (Botetourt County)
- **Cluster Springs** (Halifax County)
- Collierstown (Rockbridge County)
- **Collinsville** (Henry County)
- **Columbia** (Fluvanna County)
- **Concord** (Appomattox County and Campbell County)
- Copper Hill (Floyd County)
- **Countryside** (Loudoun County)
- **County Center** (Prince William County)
- Criglersville (Madison County)
- **Crimora** (Augusta County)
- **Crosspointe** (Fairfax County)
- **Crozet** (Albemarle County)
- Cullen (Charlotte County)
- **Cumberland** (Cumberland County)

== D ==
- **Dahlgren** (King George County)
- **Dahlgren Center** (King George County)
- **Dale City** (Prince William County)
- **Daleville** (Botetourt County)
- **Dante** (Dickenson County and Russell County)
- **Deep Creek** (Accomack County)
- Deep Run (Henrico County)
- **Deerfield** (Augusta County)
- **Deltaville** (Middlesex County)
- Dinwiddie (Dinwiddie County)
- Disputanta (Prince George County)
- **Dooms** (Augusta County)
- Doswell (Hanover County)
- **Dranesville** (Fairfax County)
- **Draper** (Pulaski County)
- **Dryden** (Lee County)
- **Dulles Town Center** (Loudoun County)
- **Dumbarton** (Henrico County)
- **Dunn Loring** (Fairfax County)
- Dyke (Greene County)

== E ==
- East Falls Church (Arlington County)
- **East Highland Park** (Henrico County)
- **East Lexington** (Rockbridge County)
- **Ebony** (Brunswick County)
- Elk Creek (Grayson County)
- **Elliston** (Montgomery County)
- **Emory** (Washington County)
- **Enon** (Chesterfield County)
- **Esmont** (Albemarle County)
- Etlan (Madison County)
- **Ettrick** (Chesterfield County)
- **Ewing** (Lee County)

== F ==
- Fagg (Montgomery County)
- **Fair Lakes** (Fairfax County)
- **Fair Oaks** (Fairfax County)
- Fair Oaks (Henrico County)
- **Fairfax Station** (Fairfax County)
- **Fairlawn** (Pulaski County)
- **Fairview** (Mecklenburg County)
- **Fairview Beach** (King George County)
- **Falmouth** (Stafford County)
- **Fancy Gap** (Carroll County)
- Farnham (Richmond County)
- **Ferrum** (Franklin County)
- **Fieldale** (Henry County)
- **Fishersville** (Augusta County)
- **Flint Hill** (Rappahannock County)
- **Floris** (Fairfax County)
- Ford (Dinwiddie County)
- **Forest** (Bedford County)
- **Fork Union** (Fluvanna County)
- **Fort Belvoir** (Fairfax County)
- Fort Blackmore (Scott County)
- **Fort Chiswell** (Wythe County)
- **Fort Gregg-Adams** (Prince George County)
- **Fort Hunt** (Fairfax County)
- Fox (Grayson County)
- **Franconia** (Fairfax County)
- **Franklin Farm** (Fairfax County)
- Franktown (Northampton County)
- **Free Union** (Albemarle County)

== G ==
- **Gainesville** (Prince William County)
- **Gargatha** (Accomack County)
- **Gasburg** (Brunswick County)
- **George Mason** (Fairfax County)
- Gilmore Mills (Rockbridge County)
- Glass (Gloucester county)
- **Glen Allen** (Henrico County)
- **Glenvar** (Roanoke County)
- **Gloucester Courthouse** (Gloucester County)
- **Gloucester Point** (Gloucester County)
- Goldbond (Giles County)
- **Goochland** (Goochland County)
- Gore (Frederick County)
- **Gratton** (Tazewell County)
- Great Bridge (City of Chesapeake)
- **Great Falls** (Fairfax County)
- **Greenbackville** (Accomack County)
- **Greenbriar** (Fairfax County)
- **Greenbush** (Accomack County)
- **Greenville** (Augusta County)
- Grove (James City County)
- **Groveton** (Fairfax County)
- **Gwynn** (Mathews County)

== H ==
- **Hampden Sydney** (Prince Edward County)
- **Hanover** (Hanover County)
- **Harborton** (Accomack County)
- **Harriston** (Augusta County)
- **Hayfield** (Fairfax County)
- **Heathsville** (Northumberland County)
- **Henry Fork** (Franklin County)
- **Highland Springs** (Henrico County)
- Hiltons (Scott County)
- Hinton (Rockingham County)
- **Hiwassee** (Pulaski County)
- Holland (City of Suffolk)
- **Hollins** (Botetourt County and Roanoke County)
- **Hollymead** (Albemarle County)
- Hood (Madison County)
- **Horntown** (Accomack County)
- **Horse Pasture** (Henry County)
- **Hot Springs** (Bath County)
- **Huntington** (Fairfax County)
- **Hybla Valley** (Fairfax County)

== I ==
- **Idylwood** (Fairfax County)
- **Independent Hill** (Prince William County)
- Index (King George County)
- **Innsbrook** (Henrico County)
- **Ivanhoe** (Wythe County)
- **Ivy** (Albemarle County)

== J ==
- Jamestown (James City County)
- **Jolivue** (Augusta County)

== K ==
- Kempsville (City of Virginia Beach)
- **Keokee** (Lee County)
- **King and Queen Court House** (King and Queen County)
- **King George** (King George County)
- **King William** (King William County)
- **Kings Park** (Fairfax County)
- **Kings Park West** (Fairfax County)
- **Kingstowne** (Fairfax County)

== L ==
- Ladysmith (Caroline County)
- **Lafayette** (Montgomery County)
- **Lake Barcroft** (Fairfax County)
- **Lake Caroline** (Caroline County)
- **Lake Holiday** (Frederick County)
- **Lake Land'Or** (Caroline County)
- **Lake Monticello** (Fluvanna County)
- **Lake of the Woods** (Orange County)
- **Lake Ridge** (Prince William County)
- **Lake Wilderness** (Spotsylvania County)
- **Lakeside** (Henrico County)
- **Lancaster** (Lancaster County)
- **Lansdowne** (Loudoun County)
- **Laurel** (Henrico County)
- **Laurel Hill** (Fairfax County)
- **Laurel Park** (Henry County)
- **Laymantown** (Botetourt County)
- **Lee Mont** (Accomack County)
- Leedstown (Westmoreland County)
- Liberty (Caroline County)
- Liberty (Fauquier County)
- Liberty (Halifax County)
- Liberty (Highland County)
- Liberty (Tazewell County)
- **Lincolnia** (Fairfax County)
- **Linton Hall** (Prince William County)
- Lively (Lancaster County)
- **Loch Lomond** (Prince William County)
- **Long Branch** (Fairfax County)
- **Lorton** (Fairfax County)
- **Loudoun Valley Estates** (Loudoun County)
- **Lovingston** (Nelson County)
- **Low Moor** (Alleghany County)
- **Lowes Island** (Loudoun County)
- **Lunenburg** (Lunenburg County)
- **Lyndhurst** (Augusta County)

== M ==
- Machipongo (Northampton County)
- **Madison Heights** (Amherst County)
- **Makemie Park** (Accomack County)
- **Manchester** (Chesterfield County)
- **Mantua** (Fairfax County)
- **Mappsburg** (Accomack County)
- **Mappsville** (Accomack County)
- Marksville (Page County)
- Marlbrook (Rockbridge County)
- **Marshall** (Fauquier County)
- **Marumsco** (Prince William County)
- **Mason Neck** (Fairfax County)
- **Massanetta Springs** (Rockingham County)
- **Massanutten** (Rockingham County)
- Massaponax (Spotsylvania County)
- **Mathews** (Mathews County)
- **Matoaca** (Chesterfield County)
- **Maurertown** (Shenandoah County)
- **Max Meadows** (Wythe County)
- **McGaheysville** (Rockingham County)
- **McLean** (Fairfax County)
- **McMullin** (Smyth County)
- **McNair** (Fairfax County)
- **Meadowbrook** (Chesterfield County)
- **Meadowview** (Washington County)
- **Mechanicsville** (Hanover County)
- Mechanicsville (Rockbridge County)
- **Merrifield** (Fairfax County)
- **Merrimac** (Montgomery County)
- **Metompkin** (Accomack County)
- **Middlebrook** (Augusta County)
- **Midland** (Fauquier County)
- Midlothian (Chesterfield County)
- **Modest Town** (Accomack County)
- **Montclair** (Prince William County)
- **Montrose** (Henrico County)
- **Montvale** (Bedford County)
- **Moorefield Station** (Loudoun County)
- Moseley (Powhatan County)
- **Motley** (Pittsylvania County)
- **Mount Hermon** (Pittsylvania County)
- **Mount Sidney** (Augusta County)
- Mount Solon (Augusta County)
- **Mount Vernon** (Fairfax County)
- **Mountain Road** (Halifax County)
- Mouth of Wilson (Grayson County)

== N ==
- **Nathalie** (Halifax County)
- Natural Bridge (Rockbridge County)
- Natural Bridge Station (Rockbridge County)
- **Neabsco** (Prince William County)
- **Nellysford** (Nelson County)
- **Nelsonia** (Accomack County)
- **New Baltimore** (Fauquier County)
- New Bohemia (Prince George County)
- **New Church** (Accomack County)
- **New Hope** (Augusta County)
- **New Kent** (New Kent County)
- **New River** (Pulaski County)
- **Newington** (Fairfax County)
- **Newington Forest** (Fairfax County)
- **Nokesville** (Prince William County)
- Norge (James City County)
- **North Shore** (Franklin County)
- **North Springfield** (Fairfax County)
- **Nottoway** (Nottoway County)
- Nurney (City of Suffolk)

== O ==
- **Oak Grove** (Loudoun County)
- **Oak Hall** (Accomack County)
- **Oak Level** (Henry County)
- **Oakton** (Fairfax County)
- **Opal** (Fauquier County)

== P ==
- Paint Bank (Craig County)
- **Palmyra** (Fluvanna County)
- **Pantops** (Albemarle County)
- **Paris** (Fauquier County)
- **Parrott** (Pulaski County)
- Partlow (Spotsylvania County)
- **Passapatanzy** (King George County)
- **Pastoria** (Accomack County)
- **Patrick Springs** (Patrick County)
- **Penhook** (Franklin County)
- **Pimmit Hills** (Fairfax County)
- **Piney Mountain** (Albemarle County)
- **Plum Creek** (Montgomery County)
- Poindexter (Louisa County)
- **Port Republic** (Rockingham County)
- **Potomac Mills** (Prince William County)
- **Powhatan** (Powhatan County)
- **Prices Fork** (Montgomery County)
- **Prince George** (Prince George County)
- Princess Anne (City of Virginia Beach)
- **Pungoteague** (Accomack County)

== Q ==
- **Quantico Base** (Prince William County and Stafford County)
- **Quinby** (Accomack County)
- Quinque (Greene County)
- Quinton (New Kent County)

== R ==
- Randolph (Charlotte County)
- Raphine (Rockbridge County)
- Rapidan (Culpeper County)
- **Raven** (Russell County and Tazewell County)
- **Ravensworth** (Fairfax County)
- Red Oak (Charlotte County)
- **Rescue** (Isle of Wight County)
- **Reston** (Fairfax County)
- **Rest**(Frederick County)
- **Riner** (Montgomery County)
- **Ripplemead** (Giles County)
- **Rivanna** (Albemarle County)
- **Riverdale** (Halifax County)
- **Riverview** (Wise County)
- Robley (Richmond County)
- Rockbridge Baths (Rockbridge County)
- **Rockwood** (Chesterfield County)
- **Rose Hill** (Fairfax County)
- **Rose Hill** (Lee County)
- **Ruckersville** (Greene County)
- **Rushmere** (Isle of Wight County)
- **Rustburg** (Campbell County)

== S ==
- **Saluda** (Middlesex County)
- **Sandston** (Henrico County)
- **Sandy Level** (Henry County)
- **Sanford** (Accomack County)
- **Savage Town** (Accomack County)
- **Savageville** (Accomack County)
- Saxe (Charlotte County)
- **Schuyler** (Nelson County)
- **Scotland** (Surry County)
- **Sedley** (Southampton County)
- **Selma** (Alleghany County)
- **Seven Corners** (Fairfax County)
- **Seven Mile Ford** (Smyth County)
- Seven Pines (Henrico County)
- Shacklefords (King and Queen County)
- **Shawnee Land** (Frederick County)
- **Shawsville** (Montgomery County)
- **Shenandoah Farms** (Clarke County and Warren County)
- **Shenandoah Retreat** (Clarke County)
- **Shenandoah Shores** (Warren County)
- **Sherando** (Augusta County)
- **Shipman** (Nelson County)
- **Short Pump** (Henrico County)
- Skinquarter (Chesterfield County)
- Skippers (Greensville County)
- **Skyland Estates** (Warren County)
- **Snowville** (Pulaski County)
- **South Chesconessex** (Accomack County)
- **South Riding** (Loudoun County)
- **South Run** (Fairfax County)
- **Southampton Meadows** (Southampton County)
- **Southern Gateway** (Stafford County)
- **Sperryville** (Rappahannock County)
- **Spotsylvania Courthouse** (Spotsylvania County)
- **Springfield** (Fairfax County)
- **Springville** (Tazewell County)
- **Stafford** (Stafford County)
- Staffordsville (Giles County)
- **Stanleytown** (Henry County)
- Steeles Tavern (Rockbridge County)
- **Sterling** (Loudoun County)
- **Stone Ridge** (Loudoun County)
- **Stuarts Draft** (Augusta County)
- **Sudley** (Prince William County)
- **Sugar Grove** (Smyth County)
- **Sugarland Run** (Loudoun County)
- **Sussex** (Sussex County)
- Syria (Madison County)

== T ==
- Tabb (York County)
- **Tasley** (Accomack County)
- **Temperanceville** (Accomack County)
- **Templeton** (Prince George County)
- **Thynedale** (Mecklenburg County)
- **Timberlake** (Campbell County)
- Toano (James City County)
- **Triangle** (Prince William County)
- **Tuckahoe** (Henrico County)
- **Twin Lakes** (Greene County)
- **Tysons Corner** (Fairfax County)

== U ==
- **Union Hall** (Franklin County)
- **Union Level** (Mecklenburg County)
- **University Center** (Loudoun County)
- **University of Virginia** (Albemarle County) (Note: The CDP encompasses the University of Virginia grounds (that part which is outside incorporated Charlottesville), along with several adjacent off-grounds housing areas.)

== V ==
- **Vansant** (Buchanan County)
- Varina (Henrico County)
- **Verona** (Augusta County)
- Vesuvius (Rockbridge County)
- **Villa Heights** (Henry County)

== W ==
- **Wakefield** (Fairfax County)
- **Warfield** (Brunswick County)
- **Warm Springs** (Bath County)
- Warren (Albemarle County)
- **Wattsville** (Accomack County)
- **West Falls Church** (Fairfax County)
- **West Springfield** (Fairfax County)
- **Westlake Corner** (Franklin County)
- **Weyers Cave** (Augusta County)
- Whaleyville (City of Suffolk)
- **Whitesville** (Accomack County)
- Whitetop (Grayson County)
- **Wintergreen** (Augusta County and Nelson County)
- Winterpock (Chesterfield County)
- **Wolf Trap** (Fairfax County)
- **Woodbridge** (Prince William County)
- **Woodburn** (Fairfax County)
- **Woodlake** (Chesterfield County)
- **Woodlawn** (Carroll County)
- **Woodlawn** (Fairfax County)
- Wylliesburg (Charlotte County)
- **Wyndham** (Henrico County)

== Y ==
- **Yogaville** (Buckingham County)
- **Yorkshire** (Prince William County)
- **Yorktown** (York County)

== Z ==
- Zuni (Isle Of Wight County)
