= East Falls Church =

East Falls Church may refer to:

- East Falls Church, Virginia, an unincorporated community in Arlington County
- East Falls Church station on the Washington Metro
