= Schooner Bay, Virginia =

- Census-designated place
- Location within Virginia Location within the United States
- Coordinates: 37°45′47″N 75°46′5″W
- Country: United States
- State: Virginia
- County: Accomack

Area
  - Total: 0.19 sq mi (0.50 km^{2})
  - Land: 0.12 sq mi (0.31 km^{2})
  - Water: 0.073 sq mi (0.19 km^{2})
- Elevation: 0 ft (0 m)

Population (2020)
  - Total: 97
  - Density: 810/sq mi (310/km^{2})
- Time zone: UTC-5 (Eastern (EST))
  - Summer (DST): UTC-4 (EDT)
- ZIP Code: 23417 (Onancock)
- Area codes: 757, 948
- FIPS code: 51-70680
- GNIS feature ID: 2584916

Schooner Bay is a census-designated place (CDP) in Accomack County, Virginia, United States. It was first listed as a CDP in 2010. As of the 2020 census, it had a population of 97.

== Geography ==
The CDP is located in west-central Accomack County and was constructed along the tidewater connecting Pompco Creek and Chesconessex Creek, two arms of Chesapeake Bay. Schooner Bay is located 7 miles (11 km) northwest of Accomac, the county seat, and is bordered to the east by the community of Deep Creek.

It lies at an elevation of 0 feet.

== Demographics ==
Historical population
Census	Pop.	Note	%±
2020	97		—
U.S. Decennial Census; 2020

Schooner Bay first appeared as a census designated place in the 2020 U.S. census.

Schooner Bay CDP, Virginia – Racial and ethnic composition Note: the US Census treats Hispanic/Latino as an ethnic category. This table excludes Latinos from the racial categories and assigns them to a separate category. Hispanics/Latinos may be of any race.
Race / Ethnicity (NH = Non-Hispanic)	Pop 2020	% 2020
White alone (NH)	88	90.72%
Black or African American alone (NH)	0	0.00%
Native American or Alaska Native alone (NH)	0	0.00%
Asian alone (NH)	0	0.00%
Native Hawaiian or Pacific Islander alone (NH)	0	0.00%
Other race alone (NH)	2	2.06%
Mixed race or Multiracial (NH)	3	3.09%
Hispanic or Latino (any race)	4	4.12%
Total	97	100.00%
