= Locust Mount, Virginia =

Unincorporated community in Virginia, United States

Locust Mount
- Census-designated place
- Location within Virginia Location within the United States
- Coordinates: 37°36′45″N 75°42′6″W
- Country: United States
- State: Virginia
- County: Accomack

Area
  - Total: 0.28 sq mi (0.73 km^{2})
  - Land: 0.28 sq mi (0.73 km^{2})
  - Water: 0 sq mi (0.0 km^{2})
- Elevation: 7 ft (2.1 m)

Population (2020)
  - Total: 52
  - Density: 184/sq mi (71.2/km^{2})
- Time zone: UTC-5 (Eastern (EST))
  - Summer (DST): UTC-4 (EDT)
- ZIP Codes: 23410 (Melfa); 23480 (Wachapreague)
- Area codes: 757, 948
- FIPS code: 51-46456
- GNIS feature ID: 2584866

Locust Mount is an unincorporated community and census-designated place (CDP) in Accomack County, Virginia, United States. It was first listed as a CDP in the 2020 census, with a population of 52. The CDP is in southeastern Accomack County, on the north side of Virginia State Route 180 (Wachapreague Road), which leads east 1.1 kilometres (0.7 mi) to Wachapreague and west 3.5 miles (5.6 km) to U.S. Route 13 at Keller.

== Geography ==
The CDP sits at an elevation of 7 feet.

== Demographics ==
Historical population
Census	Pop.	Note	%±
2020	52		—
U.S. Decennial Census; 2020

Locust Mount first appeared as a census designated place in the 2020 U.S. census.

=== 2020 census ===
Locust Mount CDP, Virginia – Racial and ethnic composition Note: the US Census treats Hispanic/Latino as an ethnic category. This table excludes Latinos from the racial categories and assigns them to a separate category. Hispanics/Latinos may be of any race.
Race / Ethnicity (NH = Non-Hispanic)	Pop 2020	% 2020
White alone (NH)	1	1.92%
Black or African American alone (NH)	42	80.77%
Native American or Alaska Native alone (NH)	1	1.92%
Asian alone (NH)	0	0.00%
Native Hawaiian or Pacific Islander alone (NH)	0	0.00%
Other race alone (NH)	0	0.00%
Mixed race or Multiracial (NH)	1	1.92%
Hispanic or Latino (any race)	7	13.46%
Total	52	100.00%
