= Greenbackville, Virginia =

- Census-designated place
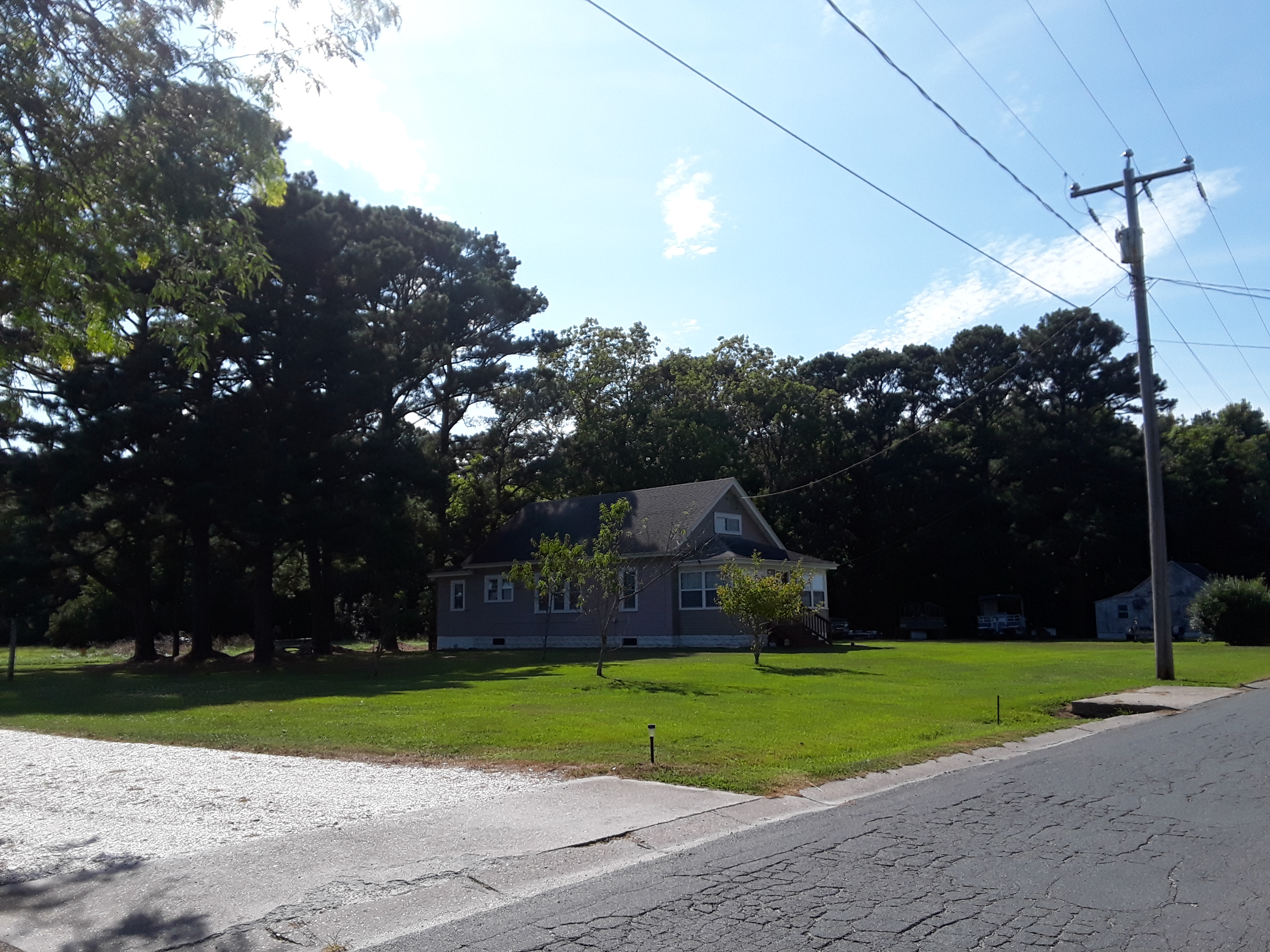
- Street scene in Greenbackville, July 2018

- Location in Accomack County and the state of Virginia.

- Location within Virginia Location within the United States
- Coordinates: 38°0′38″N 75°23′13″W
- Country: United States
- State: Virginia
- County: Accomack
- Elevation: 0 ft (0 m)

Population (2020)
  - Total: 173
- Time zone: UTC-5 (Eastern (EST))
  - Summer (DST): UTC-4 (EDT)
- ZIP code: 23356
- Area codes: 757, 948
- GNIS feature ID: 2584852

Greenbackville is a census-designated place (CDP) 4.5 miles (5 km) south of Stockton, Maryland in Accomack County, Virginia, United States, located just south of the Maryland state line. Per the 2020 census, the population was 173.

== History ==
The town was settled in 1867 and was officially named "Greenbackville" by the United States Postal Service in 1874. Greenbackville and neighboring Franklin City, Virginia grew as a result of the railroad line, the Worcester railroad, completed on April 7, 1876 to transport oysters and other shellfish from Chincoteague to Baltimore, Philadelphia, and New York City. However, during the course of the 20th century the Depression, the construction of the Chincoteague Causeway, and the nor'easter of 1962 all helped to erode Greenbackville's economic base. The railroad line from the Maryland State line into Franklin City was abandoned in 1956.

The population of Accomack County near Greenbackville grew with the creation of Captains Cove, a planned residential community just west of Greenbackville.

== Demographics ==
Historical population
Census	Pop.	Note	%±
2010	192		—
2020	173		−9.9%
U.S. Decennial Census; 2010 2020

Greenbackville was first listed as a census designated place in the 2010 U.S. census.

=== Racial and ethnic composition ===
Greenbackville CDP, Virginia – Racial and ethnic composition Note: the US Census treats Hispanic/Latino as an ethnic category. This table excludes Latinos from the racial categories and assigns them to a separate category. Hispanics/Latinos may be of any race.
Race / Ethnicity (NH = Non-Hispanic)	Pop 2010	Pop 2020	% 2010	% 2020
White alone (NH)	182	141	94.79%	81.50%
Black or African American alone (NH)	4	5	2.08%	2.89%
Native American or Alaska Native alone (NH)	0	3	0.00%	1.73%
Asian alone (NH)	0	2	0.00%	1.16%
Native Hawaiian or Pacific Islander alone (NH)	0	0	0.00%	0.00%
Other race alone (NH)	0	0	0.00%	0.00%
Mixed race or Multiracial (NH)	4	6	2.08%	3.47%
Hispanic or Latino (any race)	2	16	1.04%	9.25%
Total	192	173	100.00%	100.00%
