= Barracks, Virginia =

Unincorporated community in Virginia, United States

Barracks
- Unincorporated community Former census designated place
- Location within the state of Virginia Barracks (the United States)
- Coordinates: 38°03′27″N 78°30′48″W
- Country: United States
- State: Virginia
- County: Albemarle
- Time zone: UTC−5 (Eastern (EST))
  - Summer (DST): UTC−4 (EDT)
- GNIS feature ID: 1867583

Barracks is an unincorporated community and former census designated place (CDP) in Albemarle County, Virginia, United States.

== Demographics ==
Historical population
Census	Pop.	Note	%±
1990	4,710		—
U.S. Decennial Census; 2010

The community appeared as a census designated place in the 1990 U.S. census; and deleted prior to the 2000 U.S. census.
