= Rio, Virginia =

Unincorporated community in Virginia, United States

Rio
- Census-designated place
- Location of the Rio CDP within the Albemarle County

- Location within the Commonwealth of Virginia Rio (the United States)
- Coordinates: 38°04′34″N 78°27′40″W
- Country: United States
- State: Virginia
- County: Albemarle

Area
  - Total: 0.62 sq mi (1.6 km^{2})

Population (2020)
  - Total: 2,076
  - Density: 3,400/sq mi (1,300/km^{2})
- Time zone: UTC−5 (Eastern (EST))
  - Summer (DST): UTC−4 (EDT)
- GNIS feature ID: 1867597

Rio (/ˈraɪoʊ/ RY-oh) is an unincorporated community and census-designated place in Albemarle County, Virginia, United States. It is directly northeast of Charlottesville. As of the 2020 census, Rio had a population of 2,076.

== Demographics ==
Rio first appeared as a census designated place in the 2020 U.S. census.

The population at the 2020 census was 2,076.
