= Gargatha, Virginia =

- Census-designated place
- Location in Accomack County and the state of Virginia.

- Location within Virginia Location within the United States
- Coordinates: 37°47′26″N 75°34′55″W
- Country: United States
- State: Virginia
- County: Accomack
- Elevation: 16 ft (4.9 m)

Population (2020)
  - Total: 415
- Time zone: UTC-5 (Eastern (EST))
  - Summer (DST): UTC-4 (EDT)
- GNIS feature ID: 2584849

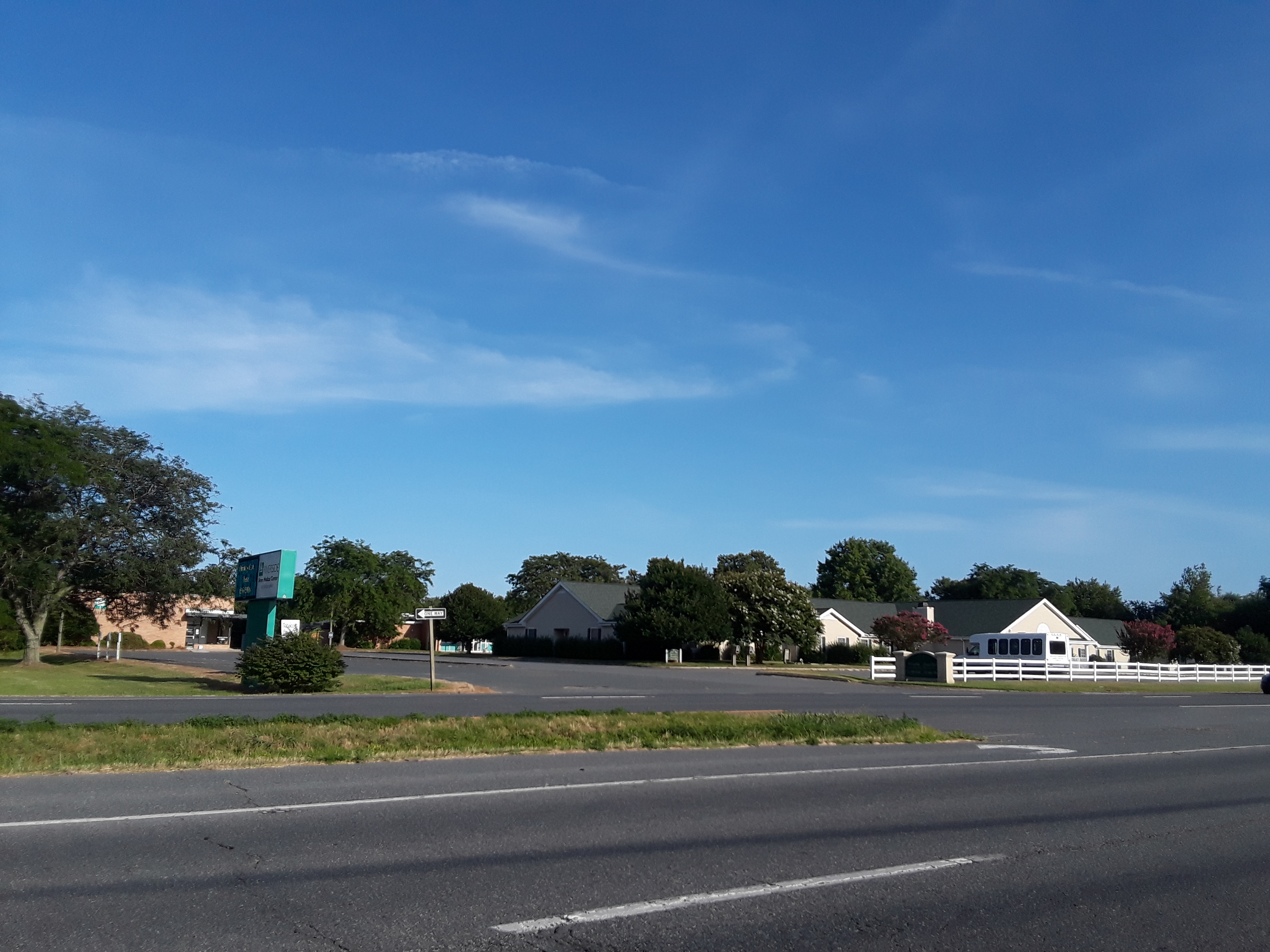
U.S. Route 13 in Gargatha, July 2018

Gargatha is a census-designated place (CDP) in Accomack County, Virginia, United States. Per the 2020 census, the population was 415.

== Geography ==
The CDP lies at an elevation of 16 feet.

== Demographics ==
Historical population
Census	Pop.	Note	%±
2010	381		—
2020	415		8.9%
U.S. Decennial Census; 2010 2020

Gargatha was first listed as a census designated place in the 2010 U.S. census.

=== 2020 census ===
Gargatha CDP, Virginia – Racial and ethnic composition Note: the US Census treats Hispanic/Latino as an ethnic category. This table excludes Latinos from the racial categories and assigns them to a separate category. Hispanics/Latinos may be of any race.
Race / Ethnicity (NH = Non-Hispanic)	Pop 2010	Pop 2020	% 2010	% 2020
White alone (NH)	194	204	50.92%	49.16%
Black or African American alone (NH)	128	153	33.60%	36.87%
Native American or Alaska Native alone (NH)	0	0	0.00%	0.00%
Asian alone (NH)	2	1	0.52%	0.24%
Native Hawaiian or Pacific Islander alone (NH)	4	0	1.05%	0.00%
Other race alone (NH)	0	0	0.00%	0.00%
Mixed race or Multiracial (NH)	5	10	1.31%	2.41%
Hispanic or Latino (any race)	48	47	12.60%	11.33%
Total	381	415	100.00%	100.00%
