= University of Virginia (census-designated place), Virginia =

University of Virginia
- CDP
- Location of the University of Virginia CDP within the Albemarle County

- Location within the Commonwealth of Virginia
- Coordinates: 38°2′0″N 78°30′47″W
- Country: United States
- State: Virginia
- County: Albemarle

Population (2020)
  - Total: 7,909
- Time zone: UTC−5 (Eastern (EST))
  - Summer (DST): UTC−4 (EDT)
- ZIP codes: 22903, 22904
- FIPS code: 51-80165
- GNIS feature ID: 2629042

University of Virginia is a census-designated place in Albemarle County, Virginia, United States. The population as of the 2010 Census was 7,704.

== Geography ==
As the name implies, the CDP encompasses the University of Virginia grounds (that part which is outside incorporated Charlottesville), along with several adjacent off-grounds housing areas, including University Heights, which was formerly its own CDP.

== Demographics ==
Historical population
Census	Pop.	Note	%±
2010	7,704		—
2020	7,909		2.7%
U.S. Decennial Census; 2010 2020

University of Virginia was first listed as a census designated place in the 2010 U.S. census.
