= Whitesville, Virginia =

- Census-designated place
- Location in Accomack County and the state of Virginia.
- Coordinates: 37°46′54″N 75°39′49″W
- Country: United States
- State: Virginia
- County: Accomack
- Elevation: 30 ft (9.1 m)

Population (2020)
  - Total: 241
- Time zone: UTC−5 (Eastern (EST))
  - Summer (DST): UTC−4 (EDT)
- FIPS code: 51-48776
- GNIS feature ID: 2584936

Whitesville is a census-designated place (CDP) in Accomack County, Virginia, United States. It was first listed as a CDP in 2010. As of the 2020 census, it had a population of 241.

== Geography ==
It rests at an elevation of 30 feet.

== Demographics ==
Historical population
Census	Pop.	Note	%±
2010	219		—
2020	215		−1.8%
U.S. Decennial Census; 2010 2020

Whitesville was first listed as a census designated place in the 2010 U.S. census.

=== 2020 census ===
Whitesville CDP, Virginia – Racial and ethnic composition Note: the US Census treats Hispanic/Latino as an ethnic category. This table excludes Latinos from the racial categories and assigns them to a separate category. Hispanics/Latinos may be of any race.
Race / Ethnicity (NH = Non-Hispanic)	Pop 2010	Pop 2020	% 2010	% 2020
White alone (NH)	47	39	21.46%	18.14%
Black or African American alone (NH)	138	113	63.01%	52.56%
Native American or Alaska Native alone (NH)	0	0	0.00%	0.00%
Asian alone (NH)	5	4	2.28%	1.86%
Pacific Islander alone (NH)	4	0	1.83%	0.00%
Other race alone (NH)	0	2	0.00%	0.93%
Mixed race or Multiracial (NH)	5	5	2.28%	2.33%
Hispanic or Latino (any race)	20	52	9.13%	24.19%
Total	219	215	100.00%	100.00%

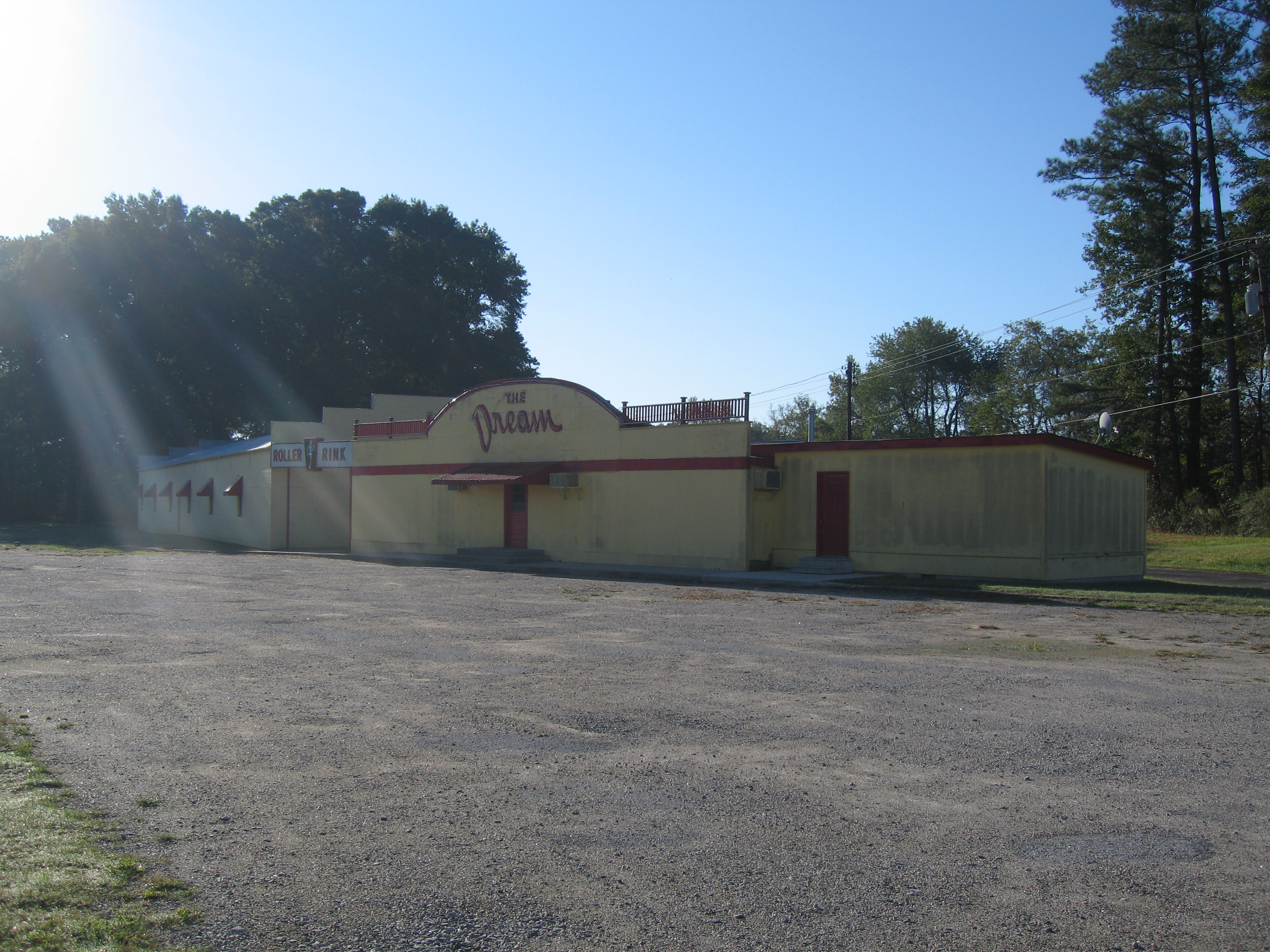
Dream Roller Rink, now abandoned, in Wattsville in 2008
