= Mappsburg, Virginia =

- Census-designated place
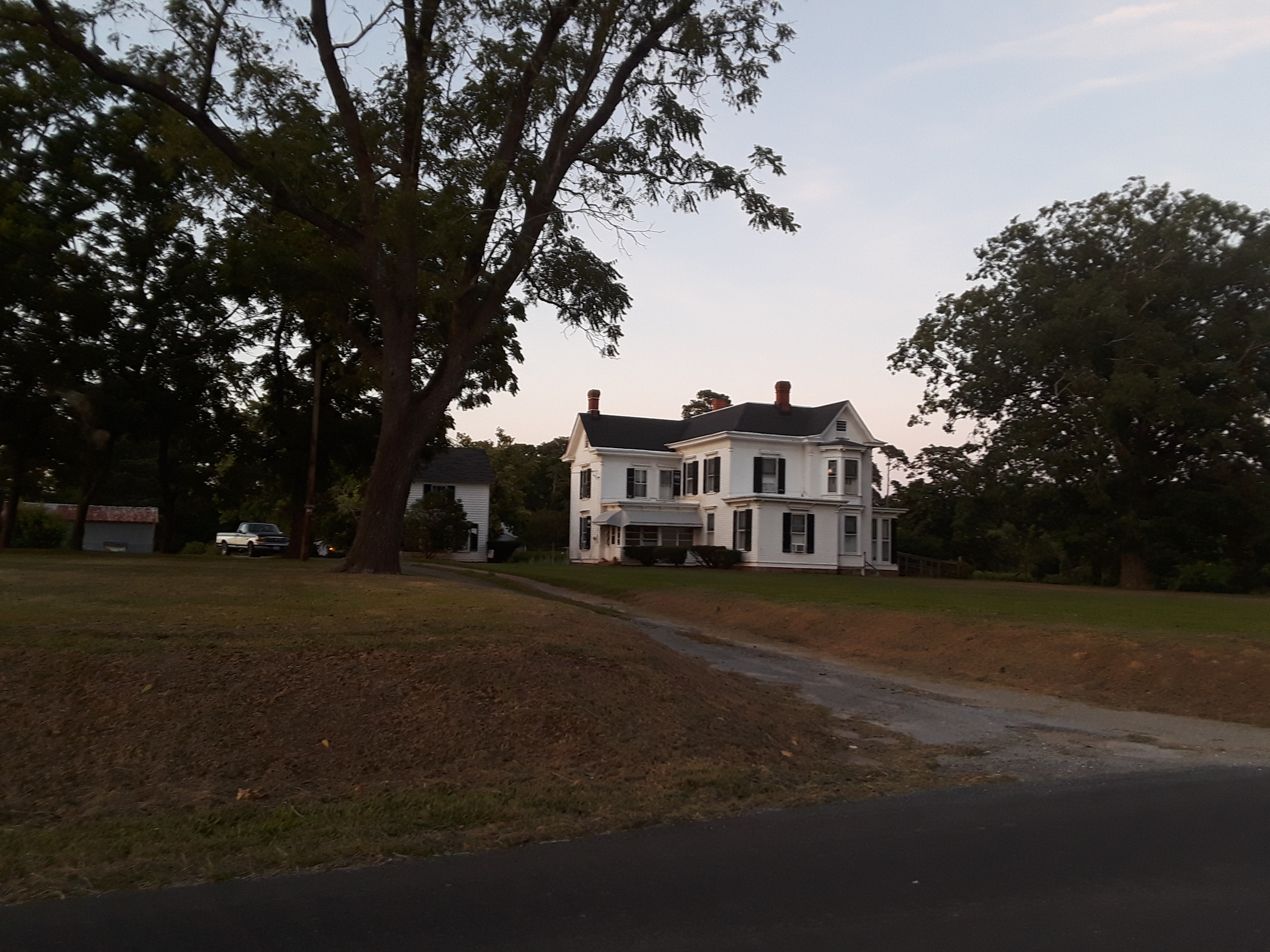
- House in Mappsburg, July 2018

- Location in Accomack County and the state of Virginia.
- Coordinates: 37°34′33″N 75°45′33″W
- Country: United States
- State: Virginia
- County: Accomack
- Elevation: 13 ft (4.0 m)

Population (2020)
  - Total: 51
- Time zone: UTC−5 (Eastern (EST))
  - Summer (DST): UTC−4 (EDT)
- FIPS code: 51-48776
- GNIS feature ID: 2584874

Mappsburg is a census-designated place (CDP) in Accomack County, Virginia, United States. Per the 2020 census, the population was 51.

== Geography ==
The CDP lies at an elevation of 13 feet.

== Demographics ==
Historical population
Census	Pop.	Note	%±
2010	60		—
2020	51		−15.0%
U.S. Decennial Census; 2010 2020

Mappsburg was first listed as a census designated place in the 2010 U.S. census.

=== 2020 census ===
Mappsburg CDP, Virginia – Racial and ethnic composition Note: the US Census treats Hispanic/Latino as an ethnic category. This table excludes Latinos from the racial categories and assigns them to a separate category. Hispanics/Latinos may be of any race.
Race / Ethnicity (NH = Non-Hispanic)	Pop 2010	Pop 2020	% 2010	% 2020
White alone (NH)	48	42	80.00%	82.35%
Black or African American alone (NH)	11	6	18.33%	11.76%
Native American or Alaska Native alone (NH)	0	0	0.00%	0.00%
Asian alone (NH)	0	0	0.00%	0.00%
Pacific Islander alone (NH)	0	0	0.00%	0.00%
Some Other Race alone (NH)	0	0	0.00%	0.00%
Mixed Race or Multi-Racial (NH)	1	0	1.67%	0.00%
Hispanic or Latino (any race)	0	3	0.00%	5.88%
Total	60	51	100.00%	100.00%

== Education ==
Mappsburg is served by Accomack County Public Schools.
