= Chase Crossing, Virginia =

- Census-designated place
- Location in Accomack County and the state of Virginia.

- Location within Virginia Location within the United States
- Coordinates: 37°45′37″N 75°39′57″W
- Country: United States
- State: Virginia
- County: Accomack
- Elevation: 36 ft (11 m)

Population (2020)
  - Total: 335
- Time zone: UTC-5 (Eastern (EST))
  - Summer (DST): UTC-4 (EDT)
- GNIS feature ID: 2584829

Chase Crossing is a census-designated place (CDP) in Accomack County, Virginia, United States. Per the 2020 census, the population was 335.

== Geography ==
The CDP rests at an elevation of 36 feet.

== Demographics ==
Historical population
| Census | Pop. | Note | %± |
|---|---|---|---|
| 2010 | 377 | | — |
| 2020 | 335 | | −11.1% |
U.S. Decennial Census; 2010 2020

Chase Crossing was first listed as a census designated place in the 2010 U.S. census.

=== 2020 census ===
Chase Crossing CDP, Virginia – Racial and ethnic composition Note: the US Census treats Hispanic/Latino as an ethnic category. This table excludes Latinos from the racial categories and assigns them to a separate category. Hispanics/Latinos may be of any race.
| Race / Ethnicity (NH = Non-Hispanic) | Pop 2010 | Pop 2020 | % 2010 | % 2020 |
|---|---|---|---|---|
| White alone (NH) | 20 | 30 | 5.31% | 8.96% |
| Black or African American alone (NH) | 125 | 101 | 33.16% | 30.15% |
| Native American or Alaska Native alone (NH) | 0 | 1 | 0.00% | 0.30% |
| Asian alone (NH) | 0 | 0 | 0.00% | 0.00% |
| Native Hawaiian or Pacific Islander alone (NH) | 2 | 0 | 0.53% | 0.00% |
| Other race alone (NH) | 0 | 4 | 0.00% | 1.19% |
| Mixed race or Multiracial (NH) | 2 | 3 | 0.53% | 0.90% |
| Hispanic or Latino (any race) | 228 | 196 | 60.48% | 58.51% |
| Total | 377 | 335 | 100.00% | 100.00% |
