= Rockwood, Virginia =

Rockwood
- CDP
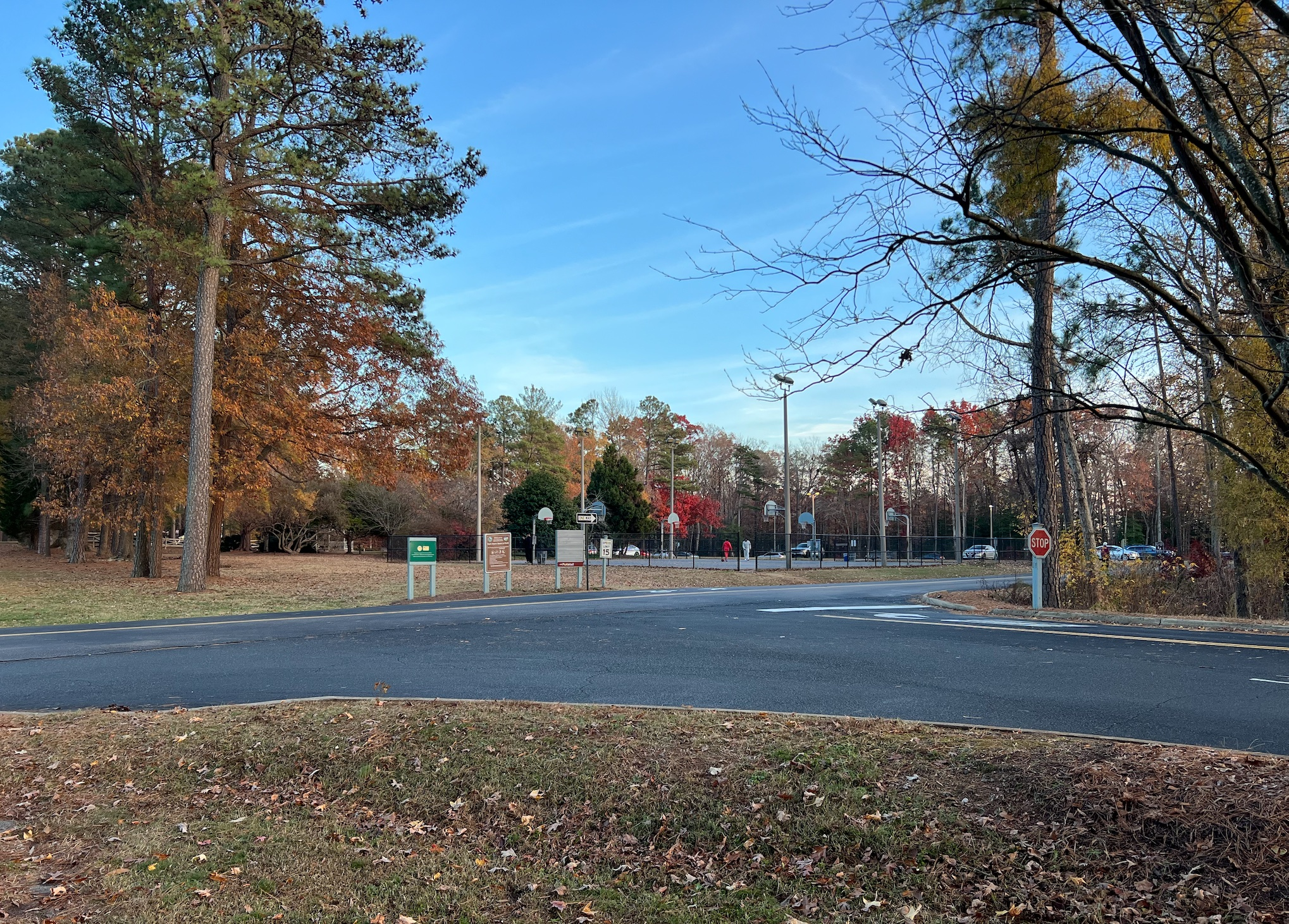
- Rockwood Park, located in and named for Rockwood.

- Location within the Commonwealth of Virginia
- Coordinates: 37°27′46″N 77°34′22″W
- Country: United States
- State: Virginia
- County: Chesterfield

Population (2020)
  - Total: 8,685
- Time zone: UTC−5 (Eastern (EST))
  - Summer (DST): UTC−4 (EDT)
- ZIP codes: 23236
- Area code: 804
- FIPS code: 51-68470
- GNIS feature ID: 2584911

Rockwood is a census-designated place in Chesterfield County, Virginia, United States. As of the 2020 census, Rockwood had a population of 8,685.

The only Chesterfield County-operated nature center is located in Rockwood.

== Demographics ==
Historical population
Census	Pop.	Note	%±
2010	8,431		—
2020	8,685		3.0%
U.S. Decennial Census; 2010 2020

Rockwood was first listed as a census designated place in the 2010 U.S. census.

=== Racial and ethnic composition ===
Rockwood CDP, Virginia – Racial and ethnic composition Note: the US Census treats Hispanic/Latino as an ethnic category. This table excludes Latinos from the racial categories and assigns them to a separate category. Hispanics/Latinos may be of any race.
Race / Ethnicity (NH = Non-Hispanic)	Pop 2010	Pop 2020	% 2010	% 2020
White alone (NH)	5,649	5,219	67.00%	60.09%
Black or African American alone (NH)	1,726	1,791	20.47%	20.62%
Native American or Alaska Native alone (NH)	15	20	0.18%	0.23%
Asian alone (NH)	340	382	4.03%	4.40%
Native Hawaiian or Pacific Islander alone (NH)	1	6	0.01%	0.07%
Other race alone (NH)	18	72	0.21%	0.83%
Mixed race or Multiracial (NH)	220	372	2.61%	4.28%
Hispanic or Latino (any race)	462	823	5.48%	9.48%
Total	8,431	8,685	100.00%	100.00%
