= Motley, Virginia =

Census-designated place in Virginia, US

Coordinates: 37°04′11″N 79°20′28″W

Motley is a census-designated place (CDP) in Pittsylvania County, Virginia, United States. It was named for a notable Virginia family in colonial times, the Motleys, two of whom, Joseph and his son David James Motley, fought in the American Revolution. The population as of the 2010 Census was 1,015 and was 825 at the 2020 census.

== Demographics ==
Historical population
| Census | Pop. | Note | %± |
|---|---|---|---|
| 2010 | 1,015 | | — |
| 2020 | 825 | | −18.7% |
U.S. Decennial Census; 2010 2020

Motley was first listed as a census designated place in the 2010 U.S. census.
