= Lake Land'Or, Virginia =

- Census-designated place
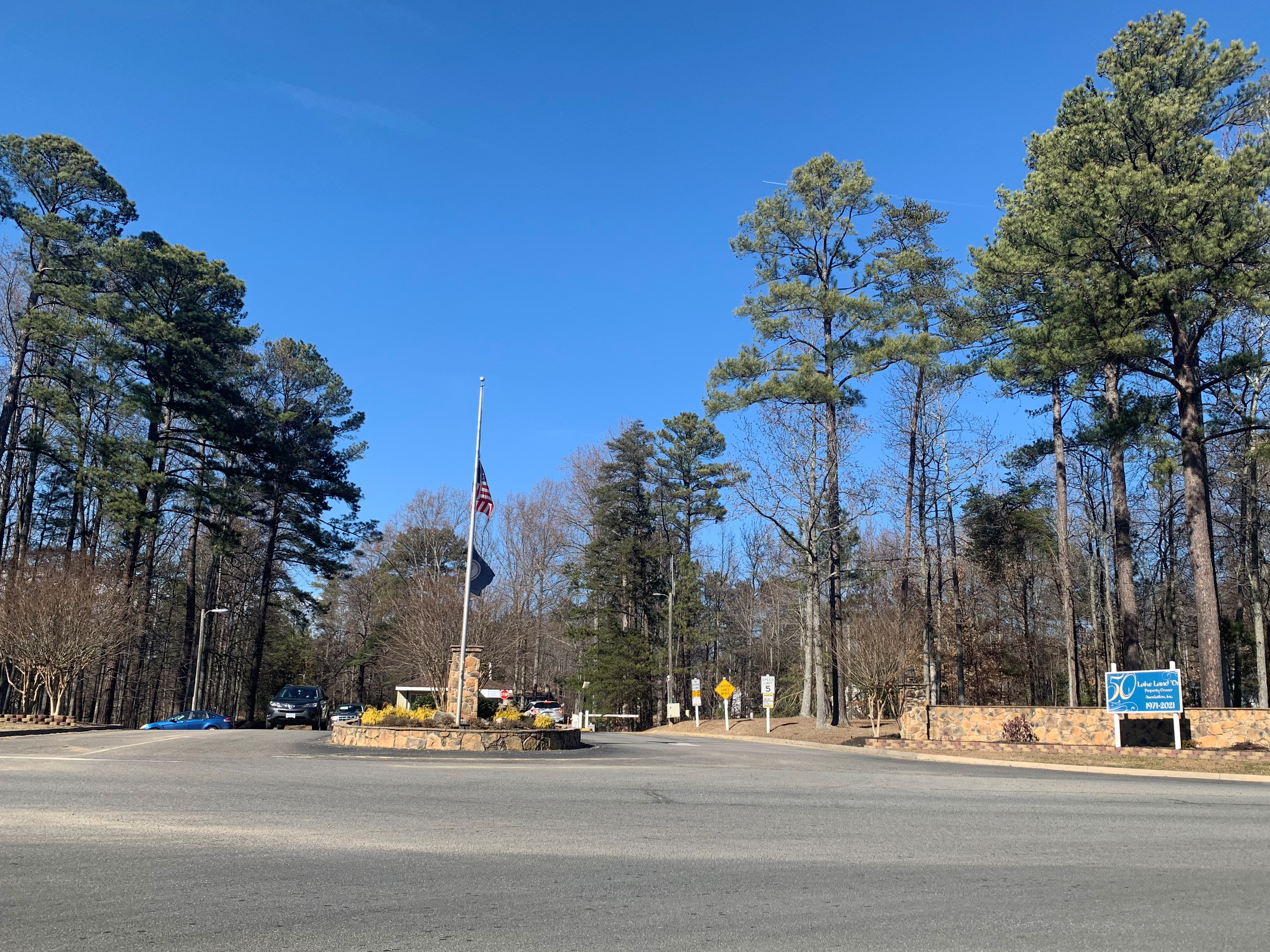
- Entrance to Lake Land'Or, seen from Ladysmith Road

- Location within Virginia
- Coordinates: 38°1′3″N 77°33′9″W
- Country: United States
- State: Virginia
- County: Caroline

Area
  - Total: 4.8 sq mi (12.4 km^{2})
  - Land: 4.5 sq mi (11.7 km^{2})
  - Water: 0.27 sq mi (0.7 km^{2})
- Elevation: 290 ft (88 m)

Population (2010)
  - Total: 4,223
  - Density: 934/sq mi (360.5/km^{2})
- Time zone: UTC−5 (Eastern (EST))
  - Summer (DST): UTC−4 (EDT)
- ZIP code: 22546
- FIPS code: 51-43420
- GNIS feature ID: 2630779
- Website: www.lakelandor.org

Lake Land'Or is a census-designated place in Caroline County, Virginia, United States. As of the 2020 census, Lake Land'Or had a population of 4,555. It is a gated subdivision built around the eponymous man-made lake and numerous smaller lakes and ponds, about 2 miles (3 km) west of Ladysmith.

== Demographics ==
Historical population
Census	Pop.	Note	%±
2010	4,223		—
2020	4,555		7.9%
U.S. Decennial Census; 2010 2020

=== 2020 census ===
As of the 2020 census, Lake Land'Or had a population of 4,555. The median age was 34.2 years. 28.1% of residents were under the age of 18 and 11.6% of residents were 65 years of age or older. For every 100 females there were 92.1 males, and for every 100 females age 18 and over there were 86.4 males age 18 and over.

0.0% of residents lived in urban areas, while 100.0% lived in rural areas.

There were 1,562 households in Lake Land'Or, of which 41.9% had children under the age of 18 living in them. Of all households, 54.5% were married-couple households, 13.7% were households with a male householder and no spouse or partner present, and 23.6% were households with a female householder and no spouse or partner present. About 20.1% of all households were made up of individuals and 6.9% had someone living alone who was 65 years of age or older.

There were 1,659 housing units, of which 5.8% were vacant. The homeowner vacancy rate was 1.8% and the rental vacancy rate was 8.8%.

Racial composition as of the 2020 census
Race	Number	Percent
White	2,873	63.1%
Black or African American	937	20.6%
American Indian and Alaska Native	12	0.3%
Asian	46	1.0%
Native Hawaiian and Other Pacific Islander	4	0.1%
Some other race	161	3.5%
Two or more races	522	11.5%
Hispanic or Latino (of any race)	345	7.6%

=== 2010 census ===
Lake Land'Or was first listed as a census designated place in the 2010 U.S. census.
