= Gasburg, Virginia =

Census-designated place in Virginia, US

Coordinates: 36°34′01″N 77°53′44″W

Gasburg is an unincorporated community and census-designated place (CDP) in Brunswick County, Virginia, United States. As of the 2020 census, Gasburg had a population of 408.

== Demographics ==
Historical population
Census	Pop.	Note	%±
2010	481		—
2020	408		−15.2%
U.S. Decennial Census; 2010 2020

Gasburg was first listed as a census designated place in the 2010 U.S. census.

=== Racial and ethnic composition ===
Gasburg CDP, Virginia – Racial and ethnic composition Note: the US Census treats Hispanic/Latino as an ethnic category. This table excludes Latinos from the racial categories and assigns them to a separate category. Hispanics/Latinos may be of any race.
Race / Ethnicity (NH = Non-Hispanic)	Pop 2010	Pop 2020	% 2010	% 2020
White alone (NH)	435	365	90.44%	89.46%
Black or African American alone (NH)	30	24	6.24%	5.88%
Native American or Alaska Native alone (NH)	1	0	0.21%	0.00%
Asian alone (NH)	3	2	0.62%	0.49%
Native Hawaiian or Pacific Islander alone (NH)	0	0	0.00%	0.00%
Other race alone (NH)	0	0	0.00%	0.00%
Mixed race or Multiracial (NH)	2	9	0.42%	2.21%
Hispanic or Latino (any race)	10	8	2.08%	1.96%
Total	481	408	100.00%	100.00%
