= Hollymead, Virginia =

Hollymead
- Census-designated place
- Location of the Hollymead CDP within the Albemarle county

- Location within the Commonwealth of Virginia Hollymead (the United States)
- Coordinates: 38°07′01″N 78°26′30″W
- Country: United States
- State: Virginia
- County: Albemarle

Population (2020)
  - Total: 8,601
- Time zone: UTC−5 (Eastern (EST))
  - Summer (DST): UTC−4 (EDT)
- GNIS feature ID: 2584858

Hollymead is a census-designated place (CDP) in Albemarle County, Virginia, United States. As of the 2020 census, Hollymead had a population of 8,601.

== Geography ==
The CDP is located approximately seven miles north of Charlottesville, near Charlottesville-Albemarle Airport.

== Demographics ==
Historical population
Census	Pop.	Note	%±
2020	8,601		—
U.S. Decennial Census; 2010 2020

Hollymead was first listed as a census designated place in the 2010 U.S. census.
