= Pastoria, Virginia =

- Census-designated place
- Location in Accomack County and the state of Virginia.
- Coordinates: 37°44′41″N 75°38′7″W
- Country: United States
- State: Virginia
- County: Accomack
- Elevation: 33 ft (10 m)

Population (2020)
  - Total: 627
- Time zone: UTC−5 (Eastern (EST))
  - Summer (DST): UTC−4 (EDT)
- ZIP codes: 23421
- FIPS code: 51-58184
- GNIS feature ID: 2584901

Pastoria is a census-designated place (CDP) in Accomack County, Virginia, United States. It was first listed as a CDP in 2010. Per the 2020 census, the population was 627.

== Geography ==
The CDP lies at an elevation of 33 feet.

== Demographics ==
Historical population
Census	Pop.	Note	%±
2010	649		—
2020	627		−3.4%
U.S. Decennial Census; 2010 2020

Pastoria was first listed as a census designated place in the 2010 U.S. census.

=== 2020 census ===
Pastoria CDP, Virginia – Racial and ethnic composition Note: the US Census treats Hispanic/Latino as an ethnic category. This table excludes Latinos from the racial categories and assigns them to a separate category. Hispanics/Latinos may be of any race.
Race / Ethnicity (NH = Non-Hispanic)	Pop 2010	Pop 2020	% 2010	% 2020
White alone (NH)	200	170	30.82%	27.11%
Black or African American alone (NH)	344	258	53.00%	41.15%
Native American or Alaska Native alone (NH)	2	1	0.31%	0.16%
Asian alone (NH)	3	2	0.46%	0.32%
Pacific Islander alone (NH)	1	0	0.15%	0.00%
Some Other Race alone (NH)	0	0	0.00%	0.00%
Mixed Race or Multi-Racial (NH)	4	19	0.62%	3.03%
Hispanic or Latino (any race)	95	177	14.64%	28.23%
Total	649	627	100.00%	100.00%
