= Savage Town, Virginia =

- Census-designated place
- Location in Accomack County and the state of Virginia.
- Coordinates: 37°33′1″N 75°47′54″W
- Country: United States
- State: Virginia
- County: Accomack
- Elevation: 36 ft (11 m)

Population (2020)
  - Total: 72
- Time zone: UTC−5 (Eastern (EST))
  - Summer (DST): UTC−4 (EDT)
- FIPS code: 51-48776
- GNIS feature ID: 2584914

Savage Town is a census-designated place (CDP) in Accomack County, Virginia, United States. Per the 2020 census, the population was 72.

== Geography ==
The CDP lies at an elevation of 36 feet.

== Demographics ==
Historical population
Census	Pop.	Note	%±
2010	78		—
2020	72		−7.7%
U.S. Decennial Census; 2010 2020

Savage Town was first listed as a census designated place in the 2010 U.S. census.

=== 2020 census ===
Savage Town CDP, Virginia – Racial and ethnic composition Note: the US Census treats Hispanic/Latino as an ethnic category. This table excludes Latinos from the racial categories and assigns them to a separate category. Hispanics/Latinos may be of any race.
Race / Ethnicity (NH = Non-Hispanic)	Pop 2010	Pop 2020	% 2010	% 2020
White alone (NH)	0	0	0.00%	0.00%
Black or African American alone (NH)	72	64	92.31%	88.89%
Native American or Alaska Native alone (NH)	0	0	0.00%	0.00%
Asian alone (NH)	0	0	0.00%	0.00%
Native Hawaiian or Pacific Islander alone (NH)	0	0	0.00%	0.00%
Other race alone (NH)	0	2	0.00%	2.78%
Mixed race or Multiracial (NH)	0	5	0.00%	6.94%
Hispanic or Latino (any race)	6	1	7.69%	1.39%
Total	78	72	100.00%	100.00%
