= Plum Creek, Virginia =

Plum Creek
- CDP
- Location within the Commonwealth of Virginia
- Coordinates: 37°7′19″N 80°30′14″W
- Country: United States
- State: Virginia
- County: Montgomery

Population (2020)
  - Total: 1,350
- Time zone: UTC−5 (Eastern (EST))
  - Summer (DST): UTC−4 (EDT)
- ZIP codes: 24073
- FIPS code: 51-63190
- GNIS feature ID: 2584903

Plum Creek is a census-designated place in Montgomery County, Virginia, United States, just east of Radford. As of the 2020 census, Plum Creek had a population of 1,350.

== Demographics ==
Historical population
Census	Pop.	Note	%±
2010	1,524		—
2020	1,350		−11.4%
U.S. Decennial Census; 2010 2020

Plum Creek was first listed as a census designated place in the 2010 U.S. census.
