= Lake Wilderness, Virginia =

- Unincorporated census-designated place
- Location within the Commonwealth of Virginia Lake Wilderness, Virginia (Virginia) Lake Wilderness, Virginia (the United States)
- Coordinates: 38°18′6″N 77°44′7″W
- Country: United States
- State: Virginia
- County: Spotsylvania

Population (2010)
  - Total: 2,669
- Time zone: UTC−5 (Eastern (EST))
  - Summer (DST): UTC−4 (EDT)
- ZIP codes: 22551
- FIPS code: 51-43600
- GNIS feature ID: 2630764

Lake Wilderness is a census-designated place in Spotsylvania County, Virginia, United States. As of the 2020 census, Lake Wilderness had a population of 2,960. It is flanked on three sides by the Wilderness Battlefield section of the Fredericksburg and Spotsylvania National Military Park.

== Demographics ==
Historical population
Census	Pop.	Note	%±
2010	2,669		—
2020	2,960		10.9%
U.S. Decennial Census; 2010 2020

Lake Wilderness was first listed as a census designated place in the 2010 U.S. census.
