= Horntown, Virginia =

- Census-designated place
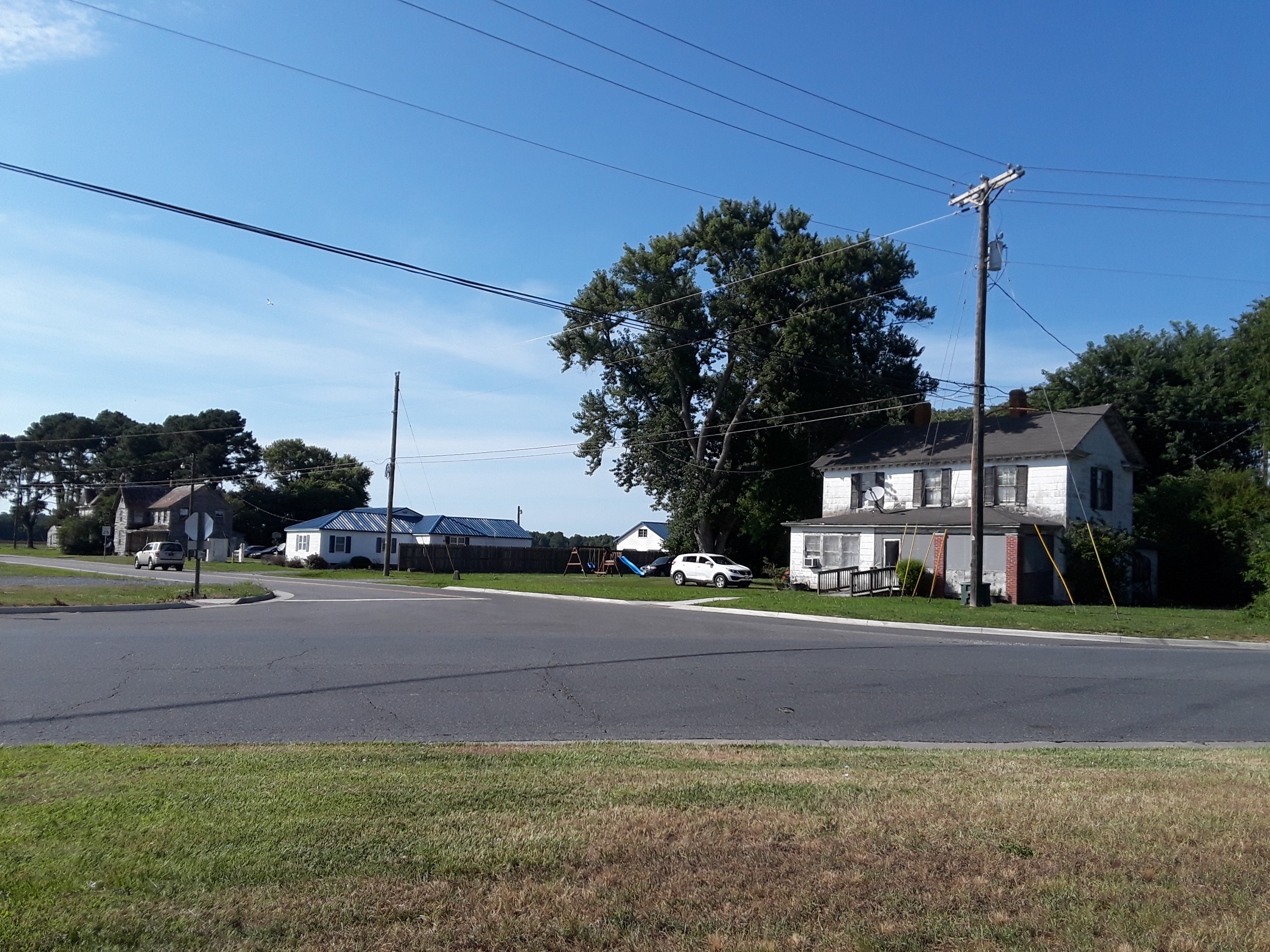
- Street scene in Horntown, July 2018

- Location in Accomack County and the state of Virginia.

- Location within Virginia Location within the United States
- Coordinates: 37°57′56″N 75°27′21″W
- Country: United States
- State: Virginia
- County: Accomack
- Elevation: 39 ft (12 m)

Population (2020)
  - Total: 912
- Time zone: UTC-5 (Eastern (EST))
  - Summer (DST): UTC-4 (EDT)
- GNIS feature ID: 2584859

Horntown is a census-designated place (CDP) in Accomack County, Virginia, United States. Per the 2020 census, the population was 912.

In the mid-19th century, Horntown was a stagecoach stop on the route between Wilmington, Delaware and Eastville.

== Geography ==
The CDP lies at an elevation of 39 feet (12 m).

== Demographics ==
Historical population
Census	Pop.	Note	%±
2010	574		—
2020	912		58.9%
U.S. Decennial Census; 2010 2020

Horntown was first listed as a census designated place in the 2010 U.S. census.

=== 2020 census ===
Horntown CDP, Virginia – Racial and ethnic composition Note: the US Census treats Hispanic/Latino as an ethnic category. This table excludes Latinos from the racial categories and assigns them to a separate category. Hispanics/Latinos may be of any race.
Race / Ethnicity (NH = Non-Hispanic)	Pop 2010	Pop 2020	% 2010	% 2020
White alone (NH)	291	620	50.70%	67.98%
Black or African American alone (NH)	258	250	44.95%	27.41%
Native American or Alaska Native alone (NH)	2	1	0.35%	0.11%
Asian alone (NH)	3	0	0.52%	0.00%
Pacific Islander alone (NH)	0	0	0.00%	0.00%
Some Other Race alone (NH)	0	6	0.00%	0.66%
Mixed Race or Multi-Racial (NH)	9	22	1.57%	2.41%
Hispanic or Latino (any race)	11	13	1.92%	1.43%
Total	574	912	100.00%	100.00%
