= Bobtown, Virginia =

- Census-designated place
- Location in Accomack County and the state of Virginia.

- Location within Virginia Location within the United States
- Coordinates: 37°38′57″N 75°47′59″W
- Country: United States
- State: Virginia
- County: Accomack
- Elevation: 13 ft (4.0 m)

Population (2020)
  - Total: 267
- Time zone: UTC-5 (Eastern (EST))
  - Summer (DST): UTC-4 (EDT)
- GNIS feature ID: 2584809

Bobtown is a census-designated place (CDP) in Accomack County, Virginia, United States. Per the 2020 census, the population was 267.

== Geography ==
The CDP lies at an elevation of 13 feet.

== Demographics ==
Historical population
Census	Pop.	Note	%±
2010	211		—
2020	267		26.5%
U.S. Decennial Census; 2010 2020

Bobtown was first listed as a census designated place in the 2010 U.S. census.

=== 2020 census ===
Bobton CDP, Virginia – Racial and ethnic composition Note: the US Census treats Hispanic/Latino as an ethnic category. This table excludes Latinos from the racial categories and assigns them to a separate category. Hispanics/Latinos may be of any race.
Race / Ethnicity (NH = Non-Hispanic)	Pop 2010	Pop 2020	% 2010	% 2020
White alone (NH)	169	207	80.09%	77.53%
Black or African American alone (NH)	31	32	14.69%	11.99%
Native American or Alaska Native alone (NH)	0	0	0.00%	0.00%
Asian alone (NH)	0	1	0.00%	0.37%
Native Hawaiian or Pacific Islander alone (NH)	4	0	1.90%	0.00%
Other race alone (NH)	0	1	0.00%	0.37%
Mixed race or Multiracial (NH)	2	5	0.95%	1.87%
Hispanic or Latino (any race)	5	21	2.37%	7.87%
Total	211	267	100.00%	100.00%
