= South Chesconessex, Virginia =

Southside Chesconessex CDP, Virginia
- Census-designated place
- Location in Accomack County and the state of Virginia.
- Coordinates: 37°44′35″N 75°46′43″W
- Country: United States
- State: Virginia
- County: Accomack
- Elevation: 3 ft (0.91 m)

Population (2020)
  - Total: 115
- Time zone: UTC−5 (Eastern (EST))
  - Summer (DST): UTC−4 (EDT)
- FIPS code: 51-48776
- GNIS feature ID: 1474844

South Chesconessex is an unincorporated community and census-designated place (CDP) in Accomack County, Virginia, United States. The census uses the name Southside Chesconessex. It was first listed as a CDP in 2010. As of the 2020 census, it had a population of 115.

== Geography ==
The CDP lies at an elevation of 3 feet.

== Demographics ==
Historical population
Census	Pop.	Note	%±
2010	131		—
2020	115		−12.2%
U.S. Decennial Census; 2010 2020

South Chesconessex was first listed as a census designated place in the 2010 U.S. census.

=== 2020 census ===
Southside Chesconessex CDP, Virginia – Racial and ethnic composition Note: the US Census treats Hispanic/Latino as an ethnic category. This table excludes Latinos from the racial categories and assigns them to a separate category. Hispanics/Latinos may be of any race.
Race / Ethnicity (NH = Non-Hispanic)	Pop 2010	Pop 2020	% 2010	% 2020
White alone (NH)	130	97	99.24%	84.35%
Black or African American alone (NH)	0	2	0.00%	1.74%
Native American or Alaska Native alone (NH)	0	1	0.00%	0.87%
Asian alone (NH)	0	2	0.00%	1.74%
Pacific Islander alone (NH)	0	0	0.00%	0.00%
Some Other Race alone (NH)	0	0	0.00%	0.00%
Mixed Race/Multi-Racial (NH)	1	10	0.76%	8.70%
Hispanic or Latino (any race)	0	3	0.00%	2.61%
Total	131	115	100.00%	100.00%
