= Adwolfe, Virginia =

Census-designated place in Virginia, US

- Census-designated place
- Location within Virginia Location within the United States
- Coordinates: 36°47′1″N 81°35′21″W
- Country: United States
- State: Virginia
- County: Smyth

Area
  - Total: 7.8 sq mi (20.3 km^{2})
  - Land: 7.8 sq mi (20.3 km^{2})
  - Water: 0 sq mi (0.0 km^{2})
- Elevation: 2,330 ft (710 m)

Population (2020)
  - Total: 1,658
- Time zone: UTC−5 (Eastern (EST))
  - Summer (DST): UTC−4 (EDT)
- FIPS code: 51-00468
- GNIS feature ID: 1495185

Adwolfe is a census-designated place (CDP) in Smyth County, Virginia, United States. The population was 1,658 at the 2020 census.

== Geography ==
Adwolfe is located at 36°47′1″N 81°35′21″W (36.783641, −81.589270).

According to the United States Census Bureau, the CDP has a total area of 7.8 square miles (20.3 km^{2}), all land.

== Demographics ==
Historical population
Census	Pop.	Note	%±
1980	1,254		—
1990	1,292		3.0%
2000	1,457		12.8%
2010	1,530		5.0%
2020	1,658		8.4%
U.S. Decennial Census; 1950 1960 1970; 1980 1990 2000; 2010

Adwolf first appeared as a census designated place in the 1980 U.S. census.

=== Racial and ethnic composition ===
Adwolf CDP, Virginia – Racial and ethnic composition Note: the US Census treats Hispanic/Latino as an ethnic category. This table excludes Latinos from the racial categories and assigns them to a separate category. Hispanics/Latinos may be of any race.
Race / Ethnicity (NH = Non-Hispanic)	Pop 2000	Pop 2010	Pop 2020	% 2000	% 2010	% 2020
White alone (NH)	1,419	1,470	1,565	97.39%	96.08%	94.39%
Black or African American alone (NH)	2	17	5	0.14%	1.11%	0.30%
Native American or Alaska Native alone (NH)	0	1	3	0.00%	0.07%	0.18%
Asian alone (NH)	3	4	2	0.21%	0.26%	0.12%
Native Hawaiian or Pacific Islander alone (NH)	0	0	0	0.00%	0.00%	0.00%
Other race alone (NH)	2	2	7	0.14%	0.13%	0.42%
Mixed race or Multiracial (NH)	14	6	49	0.96%	0.39%	2.96%
Hispanic or Latino (any race)	17	30	27	1.17%	1.96%	1.63%
Total	1,457	1,530	1,658	100.00%	100.00%	100.00%

=== 2000 census ===
As of the census of 2000, there were 1,457 people, 587 households, and 459 families residing in the CDP. The population density was 185.6 people per square mile (71.7/km^{2}). There were 617 housing units at an average density of 78.6/sq mi (30.3/km^{2}). The racial makeup of the CDP was 98.22% White, 0.14% African American, 0.21% Asian, 0.48% from other races, and 0.96% from two or more races. Hispanic or Latino of any race were 1.17% of the population.

There were 587 households, out of which 29.0% had children under the age of 18 living with them, 65.1% were married couples living together, 9.2% had a female householder with no husband present, and 21.8% were non-families. 18.4% of all households were made up of individuals, and 7.5% had someone living alone who was 65 years of age or older. The average household size was 2.48 and the average family size was 2.79.

In the CDP, the population was spread out, with 20.1% under the age of 18, 8.3% from 18 to 24, 29.0% from 25 to 44, 29.0% from 45 to 64, and 13.5% who were 65 years of age or older. The median age was 41 years. For every 100 females, there were 99.6 males. For every 100 females age 18 and over, there were 98.6 males.

The median income for a household in the CDP was $37,117, and the median income for a family was $42,941. Males had a median income of $29,861 versus $20,038 for females. The per capita income for the CDP was $16,880. About 3.6% of families and 7.8% of the population were below the poverty line, including 6.9% of those under age 18 and 4.5% of those age 65 or over.
