= Accomack County, Virginia =

County in Virginia, United States

- County
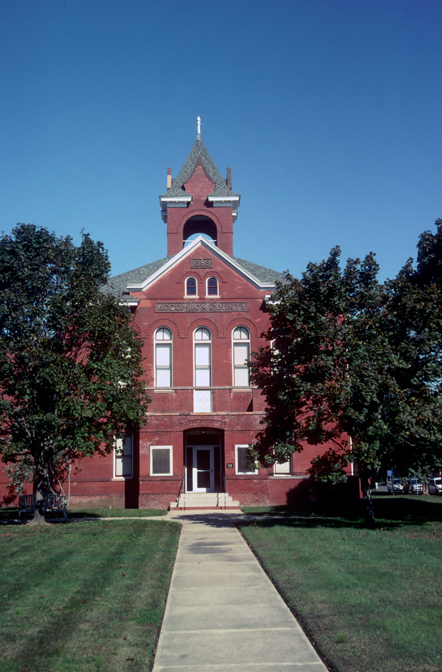
- Accomack County Courthouse

- Seal

- Location within the U.S. state of Virginia
- Coordinates: 37°46′N 75°46′W
- Country: United States
- State: Virginia
- Founded: 1671
- Seat: Accomac
- Largest town: Chincoteague

Area
  - Total: 1,310 sq mi (3,400 km^{2})
  - Land: 450 sq mi (1,200 km^{2})
  - Water: 861 sq mi (2,230 km^{2}) 65.7%

Population (2020)
  - Total: 33,413
  - Estimate (2025): 33,859 ▲
  - Density: 74.3/sq mi (28.7/km^{2})
- Time zone: UTC−5 (Eastern)
  - Summer (DST): UTC−4 (EDT)
- Congressional district: 2nd
- Website: www.co.accomack.va.us

Accomack County is a county that, together with Northampton County, constitutes the Eastern Shore region of the Virginia, United States. These two counties also form the southern portion of the Delmarva Peninsula, which is bordered by the Chesapeake Bay to the west, and the Atlantic Ocean to the east. The town of Accomac serves as the county seat, while Chincoteague is the largest town in the county.

The area was named for the Accawmack Indians, who resided in the area when the English first explored it in 1603. The region was known as Accomac Shire until it was renamed Northampton County in 1642. The present Accomack County was then carved out of Northampton County in 1663.

As of the 2020 census, Accomack County had a total population of 33,413. The population has remained relatively stable over the 20th century, though Accomack is one of the poorest parts of Virginia.

== History ==
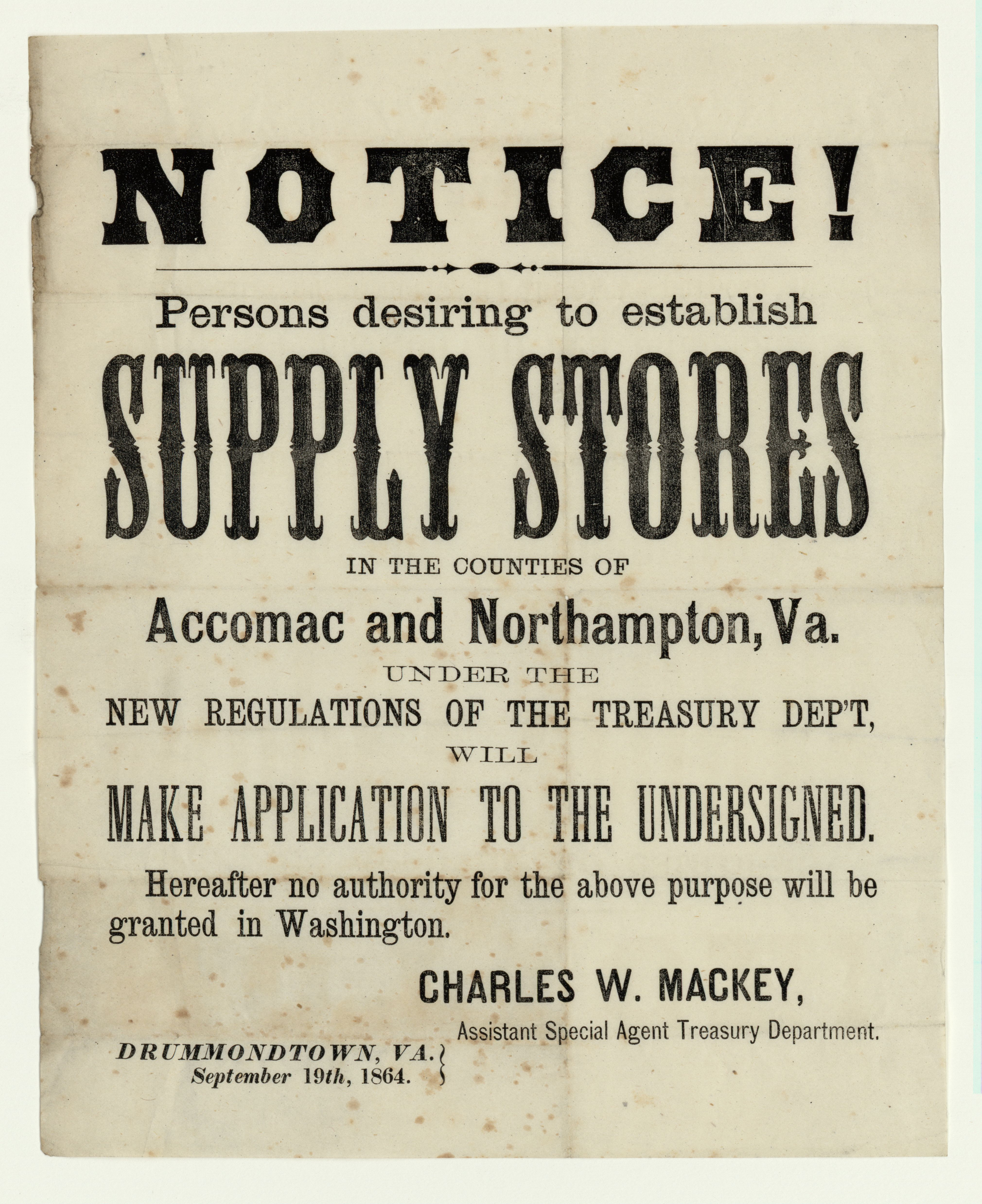
Notice to persons "desiring to establish supply stores" in Accomac and Northampton Counties, Virginia, September 19, 1864

The county was named for its original residents, the Accomac people, an Eastern Algonquian-speaking Native American tribe.

Members of an English voyage of exploration landed in the area in 1603, four years before the founding of the Jamestown Colony. Captain John Smith visited the region in 1608. The Accomac people at the time numbered around 6,000 and was led by Debedeavon, a paramount chief, whom the English colonists called the "Laughing King." He became a staunch ally of the colonists, granting them several large areas for their own use.

Accomac Shire was established in 1634 as one of the eight original shires of Virginia. The name comes from the native word Accawmacke, which meant "on the other side". In 1642 the name was changed to Northampton by the colonists. Northampton was divided into two counties in 1663. The northern adopted the original name, while the south remained Northampton.

In 1670, the Virginia Colony's Royal Governor William Berkeley abolished Accomac County, but the Virginia General Assembly re-created it in 1671.

In 1940, the General Assembly officially added a "k" to the end of the county's name to arrive at its current spelling. The name of "Accomack County" first appeared in the Decisions of the United States Board on Geographical Names in 1943.

== Geography ==
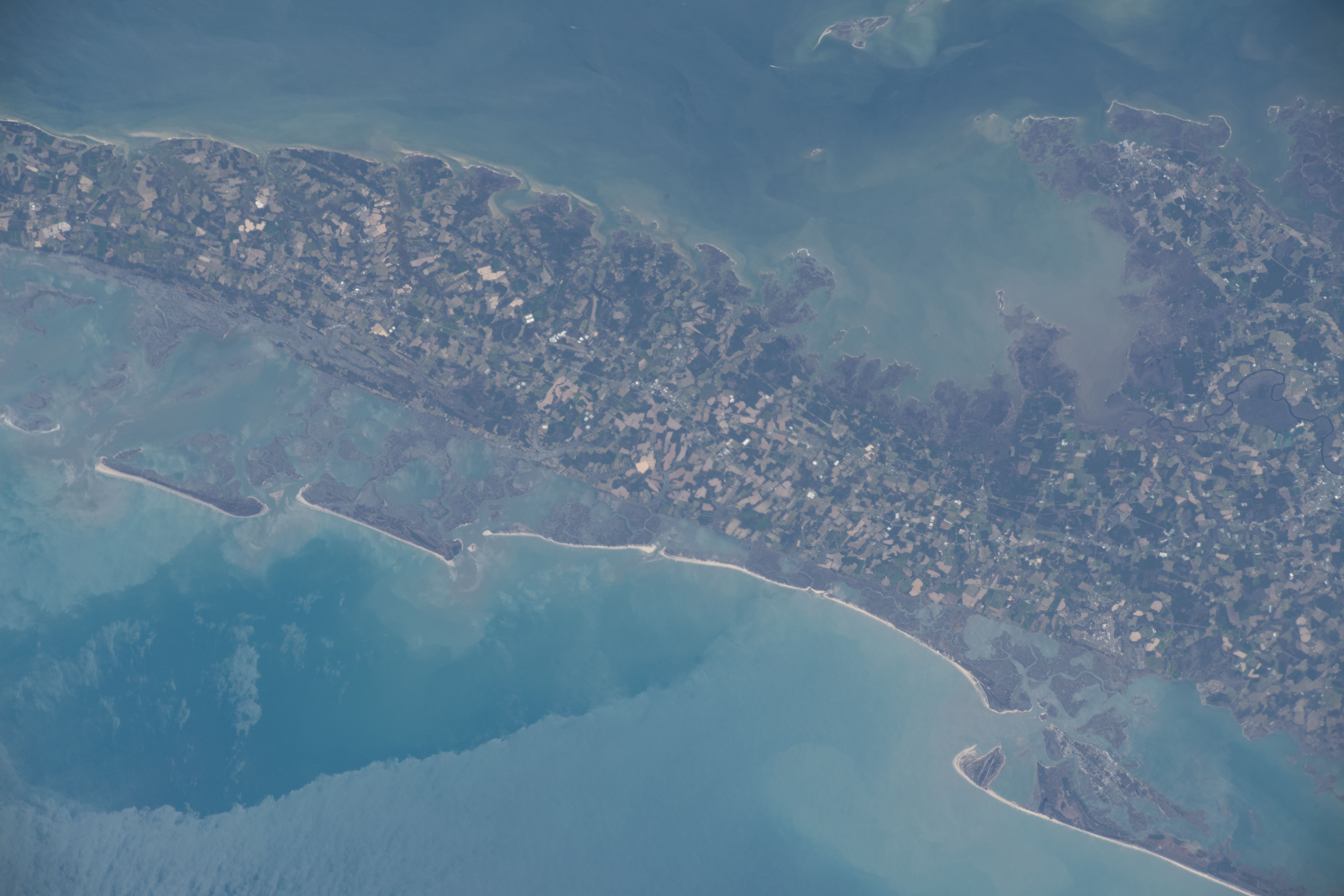
Satellite image of Accomack County

According to the U.S. Census Bureau, the county has a total area of 1,310 square miles (3,400 km^{2}), of which 450 square miles (1,200 km^{2}) is land and 861 square miles (2,230 km^{2}) (65.7%) is water. It is the largest county in Virginia by total area, as well as its easternmost county.

The state of Delaware is roughly 36 miles (58 km) away from the Virginia and Maryland state-line in Greenbackville.

== Demographics ==
Historical population
Census	Pop.	Note	%±
1790	13,959		—
1800	15,693		12.4%
1810	15,743		0.3%
1820	15,966		1.4%
1830	16,656		4.3%
1840	17,096		2.6%
1850	17,890		4.6%
1860	18,586		3.9%
1870	20,409		9.8%
1880	24,408		19.6%
1890	27,277		11.8%
1900	32,570		19.4%
1910	36,650		12.5%
1920	34,795		−5.1%
1930	35,854		3.0%
1940	33,030		−7.9%
1950	33,832		2.4%
1960	30,635		−9.4%
1970	29,004		−5.3%
1980	31,268		7.8%
1990	31,703		1.4%
2000	38,305		20.8%
2010	33,164		−13.4%
2020	33,413		0.8%
2025 (est.)	33,859	▲	1.3%
U.S. Decennial Census; 1790-1960 1900-1990; 1990-2000 2010 2020

=== Racial and ethnic composition ===
Accomack County, Virginia – Racial and ethnic composition Note: the US Census treats Hispanic/Latino as an ethnic category. This table excludes Latinos from the racial categories and assigns them to a separate category. Hispanics/Latinos may be of any race.
Race / Ethnicity (NH = Non-Hispanic)	Pop 1980	Pop 1990	Pop 2000	Pop 2010	Pop 2020	% 1980	% 1990	% 2000	% 2010	% 2020
White alone (NH)	19,644	20,315	23,697	20,266	19,825	62.82%	64.08%	61.86%	61.11%	59.33%
Black or African American alone (NH)	11,113	10,834	12,039	9,253	8,639	35.54%	34.17%	31.43%	27.90%	25.86%
Native American or Alaska Native alone (NH)	43	35	106	97	65	0.14%	0.11%	0.28%	0.29%	0.19%
Asian alone (NH)	44	63	86	177	249	0.14%	0.20%	0.22%	0.53%	0.75%
Native Hawaiian or Pacific Islander alone (NH)	x	x	10	34	1	x	x	0.03%	0.10%	0.00%
Other race alone (NH)	5	4	35	44	99	0.02%	0.01%	0.09%	0.13%	0.30%
Mixed race or Multiracial (NH)	x	x	270	443	1,105	x	x	0.70%	1.34%	3.31%
Hispanic or Latino (any race)	419	452	2,062	2,850	3,430	1.34%	1.43%	5.38%	8.59%	10.27%
Total	31,268	31,703	38,305	33,164	33,413	100.00%	100.00%	100.00%	100.00%	100.00%

=== 2020 census ===
As of the 2020 census, the county had a population of 33,413. The median age was 47.8 years. 19.6% of residents were under the age of 18 and 24.6% of residents were 65 years of age or older. For every 100 females there were 93.8 males, and for every 100 females age 18 and over there were 90.6 males age 18 and over.

The racial makeup of the county was 60.6% White, 25.9% Black or African American, 0.9% American Indian and Alaska Native, 0.8% Asian, 0.0% Native Hawaiian and Pacific Islander, 6.5% from some other race, and 5.3% from two or more races. Hispanic or Latino residents of any race comprised 10.3% of the population.

9.6% of residents lived in urban areas, while 90.4% lived in rural areas.

There were 14,302 households in the county, of which 24.2% had children under the age of 18 living with them and 30.0% had a female householder with no spouse or partner present. About 31.4% of all households were made up of individuals and 15.8% had someone living alone who was 65 years of age or older.

There were 21,703 housing units, of which 34.1% were vacant. Among occupied housing units, 70.5% were owner-occupied and 29.5% were renter-occupied. The homeowner vacancy rate was 3.0% and the rental vacancy rate was 9.7%.

=== 2010 census ===
As of the census of 2010, there were 33,164 people, 15,299 households, and 10,388 families residing in the county. The population density was 84 people per square mile (32 people/km^{2}). There were 19,550 housing units at an average density of 43 units per square mile (17 units/km^{2}). The racial makeup of the county was 65.3% White, 28.1% Black or African American, 0.4% Native American, 0.6% Asian, 0.1% Pacific Islander, 3.9% from other races, and 1.6% from two or more races. 8.6% of the population were Hispanic or Latino of any race. Black or African American (28%), English American (15%), German (9%), Irish (9%) and Mexican (4%).

There were 15,299 households, out of which 28.90% had children under the age of 18 living with them, 49.20% were married couples living together, 14.40% had a female householder with no husband present, and 32.10% were non-families. 27.70% of all households were made up of individuals, and 12.50% had someone living alone who was 65 years of age or older. The average household size was 2.45 and the average family size was 2.96.

In the county, the population was spread out, with 24.30% under the age of 18, 8.20% from 18 to 24, 26.20% from 25 to 44, 24.70% from 45 to 64, and 16.70% who were 65 years of age or older. The median age was 39 years. For every 100 females there were 94.30 males. For every 100 females age 18 and over, there were 90.00 males.

Accomack and adjacent Northampton County are the two poorest counties in the Commonwealth of Virginia.

== Government and politics ==
=== Board of Supervisors ===
Board of County Supervisors
Name	Party	District
William J. "Billy Joe" Tarr	Ind	1
Ron Wolff	Dem	2
Vanessa Johnson	Dem	3
Paul E.J. Muhly	Ind	4
Harrison W. Phillips, III	Ind	5
Robert Crockett	Ind	6
Jackie Phillips	Ind	7
Donald Hart, Jr.	Dem	8
C. Reneta Major	Dem	9

=== Constitutional officers ===
- Clerk of the Circuit Court: Talia C. Taylor (I)
- Commissioner of the Revenue: Kim A. Satterwhite (I)
- Commonwealth's Attorney: J. Spencer Morgan, III (I)
- Sheriff: W. Todd Wessells (I)
- Treasurer: James Lilliston, Sr. (I)

Accomack County is represented by Republican William “Bill” DeSteph, Jr in the Virginia Senate, Republican Robert Bloxom in the Virginia House of Delegates, and Republican Jen Kiggans in the U.S. House of Representatives.

=== Presidential politics ===
Accomack County has been consistently Republican-leaning in the 21st century; prior to this, it was a Democratic stronghold turned swing county. The last Democrat to obtain an absolute majority was Jimmy Carter in 1976, though Bill Clinton narrowly carried the county by a plurality in 1996.

United States presidential election results for Accomack County, Virginia
Year	Republican		Democratic		Third party(ies)	
Year	No.	%	No.	%	No.	%
1912	153	7.24%	1,825	86.33%	136	6.43%
1916	299	14.44%	1,745	84.30%	26	1.26%
1920	409	16.49%	2,026	81.69%	45	1.81%
1924	307	12.64%	2,087	85.92%	35	1.44%
1928	1,367	42.81%	1,826	57.19%	0	0.00%
1932	527	17.53%	2,458	81.74%	22	0.73%
1936	670	29.66%	1,583	70.08%	6	0.27%
1940	882	37.28%	1,476	62.38%	8	0.34%
1944	1,045	37.39%	1,747	62.50%	3	0.11%
1948	1,088	35.05%	1,669	53.77%	347	11.18%
1952	2,626	53.99%	2,220	45.64%	18	0.37%
1956	2,823	54.25%	2,213	42.52%	168	3.23%
1960	2,676	47.95%	2,884	51.68%	21	0.38%
1964	3,145	47.06%	3,528	52.79%	10	0.15%
1968	3,231	35.19%	2,467	26.87%	3,483	37.94%
1972	6,496	71.97%	2,406	26.66%	124	1.37%
1976	4,494	47.13%	4,807	50.41%	235	2.46%
1980	5,371	50.21%	4,872	45.54%	455	4.25%
1984	8,047	64.55%	4,355	34.94%	64	0.51%
1988	6,926	60.01%	4,443	38.49%	173	1.50%
1992	5,666	43.17%	4,950	37.71%	2,509	19.12%
1996	5,013	43.02%	5,220	44.79%	1,421	12.19%
2000	6,352	53.27%	5,092	42.70%	481	4.03%
2004	7,726	57.85%	5,518	41.31%	112	0.84%
2008	7,833	50.14%	7,607	48.69%	183	1.17%
2012	8,213	51.17%	7,655	47.69%	183	1.14%
2016	8,583	54.26%	6,740	42.61%	495	3.13%
2020	9,172	54.07%	7,578	44.68%	212	1.25%
2024	9,659	56.24%	7,374	42.93%	143	0.83%

=== Adjacent counties ===
- Somerset County, Maryland - northwest
- Worcester County, Maryland - northeast
- Northampton County - south

=== National protected areas ===
- Assateague Island National Seashore (part)
- Chincoteague National Wildlife Refuge (part)
- Martin National Wildlife Refuge (part, Watts Island portion)
- Wallops Island National Wildlife Refuge

== Economy ==
Accomack County is home to large chicken processing facilities owned by Perdue Farms and Tyson Foods.

== Transportation ==
=== Airport ===
- Accomack County Airport is in an unincorporated area near Melfa.

=== Major highways ===
- US 13
- US 13 Bus.
- SR 175
- SR 176
- SR 178
- SR 179
- SR 180
- SR 182
- SR 187
- SR 316

=== Public transportation ===
STAR Transit provides public transit services for both Accomack and Northampton counties and is headquartered in Tasley.

== Education ==
The county is served by Accomack County Public Schools. It is the only school district in the county.

High schools and K-12 schools in this district are:

- Arcadia High School
- Chincoteague High School
- Nandua High School
- Tangier Combined School

Eastern Shore Community College is located near Melfa.

== Media ==
The county maintains and is the licensee of six television translator stations on two towers, with four located on a tower off US 13 in unincorporated Mappsville licensed to Onancock, and the other two licensed to unincorporated Craddockville on a tower near Route 178. Each translator tower has four signals to relay the signals of Hampton Roads's major network affiliates to the county, including WAVY, WHRO, WTKR, and WVEC. Meanwhile, Fox programming via WVBT is provided by WPMC-CA (Channel 36) from the Mappsville tower, a station owned by Nexstar Media Group, the parent company of WAVY/WVBT.

Additionally, Salisbury, Maryland CBS / Fox affiliate WBOC-TV has long claimed Accomack County as part of its coverage area.

Call letters	City of license	Channel	Station relayed (Network)
W14DY-D	Onancock	14	WAVY (NBC)
W42DP	Craddockville	42	WAVY (NBC)
W25AA-D	Onancock	25	WHRO (PBS)
W18EG-D	Onancock	18	WAVY (NBC), 18.1; WVEC (ABC), 18.2; WTKR (CBS), 18.3; WHRO (PBS), 18.4
W22DN	Craddockville	22	WTKR (CBS)
W34DN	Onancock	34	WVEC (ABC)

== Communities ==
=== Towns ===
Accomack County has 14 towns, which is the most of any county in Virginia. This is double the number of towns of the locality with the next-most towns, a position which is held by both Loudoun and Rockingham counties both.

- Accomac
- Belle Haven, Partially within Northampton County as well
- Bloxom
- Chincoteague
- Hallwood
- Keller
- Melfa
- Onancock
- Onley
- Painter
- Parksley
- Saxis
- Tangier
- Wachapreague

=== Census Designated Places ===
- Atlantic
- Bayside
- Bobtown
- Boston
- Captains Cove
- Cats Bridge
- Chase Crossing
- Deep Creek
- Gargatha
- Greenbackville
- Greenbush
- Harborton
- Horntown
- Lee Mont
- Locust Mount
- Makemie Park
- Mappsburg
- Mappsville
- Metompkin
- Modest Town
- Nelsonia
- New Church
- Oak Hall
- Pastoria
- Pungoteague
- Quinby
- Sanford
- Savage Town
- Savageville
- Schooner Bay
- Southside Chesconessex
- Tasley
- Temperanceville
- Wattsville
- Whitesville

== Notable people ==
- William Anderson (1762–1829) born in Accomack County, United States Congressman from Pennsylvania
- Thomas Evans (c.1755–1815), born in Accomack County, United States Congressman from Virginia
- Lucy Virginia French (1825–1881), writer
- George T. Garrison (1835–1889), born in Accomack County, member of Virginia state legislature and United States Congressman from Virginia
- James Hamilton (c.1710–1783), born in Accomack County, lawyer and mayor of Philadelphia
- James Henry (1731–1804), born in Accomack County, lawyer and delegate to the Continental Congress
- Ralph Northam (born 1957), born and raised in Accomack County, 73rd Governor of Virginia
- W. Sherman Savage (1890–1981), born and raised in Accomack County, historian of African Americans in the Old West
- David P. Weber (? -), resident of Accomack County, lawyer, professor and forensic accountant, who was a prominent whistleblower in the Bernard L. Madoff misconduct and Chinese Espionage matters
- Henry A. Wise (1806–1876), Minister to Brazil, Governor of Virginia and Confederate General

== In popular culture ==
=== Music ===
In Sydney Brown's lyrics for the Maple Leaf Rag, the first line states, "I come from ol' Virginny, from de County Accomack"

== See also ==
- National Register of Historic Places listings in Accomack County, Virginia
