= Parrott, Virginia =

- Census-designated place (CDP)
- Location of Belspring in Virginia
- Coordinates: 37°12′18″N 80°36′56″W
- Country: United States
- State: Virginia
- County: Pulaski

Area
  - Water: 0 sq mi (0 km^{2})
- Elevation: 1,785 ft (544 m)
- Time zone: UTC-5 (EST)
  - Summer (DST): UTC-4 (EDT)
- GNIS feature ID: 1486071

Parrott is a census-designated place (CDP) in Pulaski County, Virginia, United States. As of the 2020 census, Parrott had a population of 358.

The town was named after John Henry Parrott Jr.(1847-1930). Parrott started the Pulaski Anthracite coal mine in 1902 and was the mine's general manager and probable shareholder.

Parrott is bordered by the New River which is the oldest river system on the North American continent and second only to the Nile River in Africa as the oldest river in the world. It flows northward rather than southward like most of the other major rivers along the eastern seaboard.

== Demographics ==
Historical population
Census	Pop.	Note	%±
2020	358		—
U.S. Decennial Census; 2010 2020

Parrott was first listed as a census designated place in the 2010 U.S. census.
