= Piney Mountain, Virginia =

Piney Mountain
- CDP
- Location of the Piney Mountain CDP within the Albemarle County

- Location within the Commonwealth of Virginia
- Coordinates: 38°9′44″N 78°24′40″W
- Country: United States
- State: Virginia
- County: Albemarle

Population (2020)
  - Total: 1,880
- Time zone: UTC−5 (Eastern (EST))
  - Summer (DST): UTC−4 (EDT)
- ZIP codes: 22911
- FIPS code: 51-62738
- GNIS feature ID: 2584902

Piney Mountain is a census-designated place in Albemarle County, Virginia, United States. As of the 2020 census, Piney Mountain had a population of 1,880.

== Geography ==
It is a suburban area located about ten miles north of Charlottesville, near the base of Piney Mountain, largely composed of the Briarwood and Camelot neighborhoods.

== Demographics ==
Historical population
Census	Pop.	Note	%±
2010	1,130		—
2020	1,880		66.4%
U.S. Decennial Census; 2010 2020

Piney Mountain was first listed as a census designated place in the 2010 U.S. census.

=== 2020 census ===
As of the 2020 census, Piney Mountain had a population of 1,880. The median age was 34.9 years. 27.9% of residents were under the age of 18 and 9.9% of residents were 65 years of age or older. For every 100 females there were 89.7 males, and for every 100 females age 18 and over there were 87.3 males age 18 and over.

0.0% of residents lived in urban areas, while 100.0% lived in rural areas.

There were 672 households in Piney Mountain, of which 40.5% had children under the age of 18 living in them. Of all households, 53.6% were married-couple households, 14.6% were households with a male householder and no spouse or partner present, and 25.4% were households with a female householder and no spouse or partner present. About 21.5% of all households were made up of individuals and 8.3% had someone living alone who was 65 years of age or older.

There were 698 housing units, of which 3.7% were vacant. The homeowner vacancy rate was 1.1% and the rental vacancy rate was 9.0%.

Racial composition as of the 2020 census
Race	Number	Percent
White	1,052	56.0%
Black or African American	391	20.8%
American Indian and Alaska Native	1	0.1%
Asian	158	8.4%
Native Hawaiian and Other Pacific Islander	2	0.1%
Some other race	60	3.2%
Two or more races	216	11.5%
Hispanic or Latino (of any race)	166	8.8%
