= Cats Bridge, Virginia =

- Census-designated place
- Location in Accomack County and the state of Virginia.

- Location within Virginia Location within the United States
- Coordinates: 37°32′57″N 75°46′47″W
- Country: United States
- State: Virginia
- County: Accomack
- Elevation: 10 ft (3.0 m)

Population (2020)
  - Total: 184
- Time zone: UTC-5 (Eastern (EST))
  - Summer (DST): UTC-4 (EDT)
- GNIS feature ID: 2584827

Cats Bridge is a census-designated place (CDP) in Accomack County, Virginia, United States. Per the 2020 census, the population was 184.

== Geography ==
The CDP lies at an elevation of 10 feet.

== Demographics ==
Historical population
Census	Pop.	Note	%±
2010	229		—
2020	184		−19.7%
U.S. Decennial Census; 2010 2020

Captains Bridge was first listed as a census designated place in the 2010 U.S. census.

=== 2020 census ===
Cats Bridge CDP, Virginia – Racial and ethnic composition Note: the US Census treats Hispanic/Latino as an ethnic category. This table excludes Latinos from the racial categories and assigns them to a separate category. Hispanics/Latinos may be of any race.
Race / Ethnicity (NH = Non-Hispanic)	Pop 2010	Pop 2020	% 2010	% 2020
White alone (NH)	25	20	10.92%	10.87%
Black or African American alone (NH)	194	158	84.72%	85.87%
Native American or Alaska Native alone (NH)	0	0	0.00%	0.00%
Asian alone (NH)	0	0	0.00%	0.00%
Native Hawaiian or Pacific Islander alone (NH)	0	0	0.00%	0.00%
Other race alone (NH)	0	0	0.00%	0.00%
Mixed race or Multiracial (NH)	1	2	0.44%	1.09%
Hispanic or Latino (any race)	9	4	3.93%	2.17%
Total	229	184	100.00%	100.00%
