= Lee Mont, Virginia =

- Census-designated place
- Location in Accomack County and the state of Virginia.

- Location within Virginia Location within the United States
- Coordinates: 37°46′47″N 75°40′48″W
- Country: United States
- State: Virginia
- County: Accomack
- Elevation: 13 ft (4.0 m)

Population (2020)
  - Total: 102
- Time zone: UTC-5 (Eastern (EST))
  - Summer (DST): UTC-4 (EDT)
- GNIS feature ID: 2584865

Lee Mont is a census-designated place (CDP) in Accomack County, Virginia, United States. Per the 2020 census, the population was 102.

== Geography ==
The CDP lies at an elevation of 13 feet.

== Demographics ==
Historical population
Census	Pop.	Note	%±
2010	125		—
2020	102		−18.4%
U.S. Decennial Census; 2010 2020

Lee Mont was first listed as a census designated place in the 2010 U.S. census.

=== 2020 census ===
Lee Mont CDP, Virginia – Racial and ethnic composition Note: the US Census treats Hispanic/Latino as an ethnic category. This table excludes Latinos from the racial categories and assigns them to a separate category. Hispanics/Latinos may be of any race.
Race / Ethnicity (NH = Non-Hispanic)	Pop 2010	Pop 2020	% 2010	% 2020
White alone (NH)	95	75	76.00%	73.53%
Black or African American alone (NH)	9	12	7.20%	11.76%
Native American or Alaska Native alone (NH)	0	0	0.00%	0.00%
Asian alone (NH)	0	0	0.00%	0.00%
Pacific Islander alone (NH)	3	0	2.40%	0.00%
Some Other Race alone (NH)	0	0	0.00%	0.00%
Mixed Race or Multi-Racial (NH)	3	1	2.40%	0.98%
Hispanic or Latino (any race)	15	14	12.00%	13.73%
Total	125	102	100.00%	100.00%
