= Shenandoah Shores, Virginia =

Shenandoah Shores
- CDP
- Location within the Commonwealth of Virginia Shenandoah Shores (Virginia) Shenandoah Shores (the United States)
- Coordinates: 38°57′44″N 78°8′25″W
- Country: United States
- State: Virginia
- County: Warren

Population (2010)
  - Total: 934
- Time zone: UTC−5 (Eastern (EST))
  - Summer (DST): UTC−4 (EDT)
- ZIP codes: 22630
- FIPS code: 51-71826
- GNIS feature ID: 2629749

Shenandoah Shores is a census-designated place in Warren County, Virginia, United States, just north of Front Royal. As of the 2020 census, Shenandoah Shores had a population of 1,112.

== Demographics ==
Historical population
Census	Pop.	Note	%±
2010	934		—
2020	1,112		19.1%
U.S. Decennial Census; 2010 2020

Shenandoah Shores was first listed as a census designated place in the 2010 U.S. census.
