= Thynedale, Virginia =

Thynedale
- CDP
- Location within the Commonwealth of Virginia
- Coordinates: 36°49′5″N 78°28′39″W
- Country: United States
- State: Virginia
- County: Mecklenburg

Population (2010)
  - Total: 197
- Time zone: UTC−5 (Eastern (EST))
  - Summer (DST): UTC−4 (EDT)
- ZIP codes: 23924
- FIPS code: 51-78532
- GNIS feature ID: 2584930

Thynedale is a census-designated place in Mecklenburg County, Virginia, United States, just north of Chase City. As of the 2020 census, Thynedale had a population of 152.

== Demographics ==
Historical population
Census	Pop.	Note	%±
2010	197		—
2020	152		−22.8%
U.S. Decennial Census; 2010 2020

Thynedale was first listed as a census designated place in the 2010 U.S. census.
