= Skyland Estates, Virginia =

Skyland Estates
- CDP
- Location within the Commonwealth of Virginia Skyland Estates (Virginia) Skyland Estates (the United States)
- Coordinates: 38°55′56″N 78°4′56″W
- Country: United States
- State: Virginia
- County: Warren

Population (2010)
  - Total: 830
- Time zone: UTC−5 (Eastern (EST))
  - Summer (DST): UTC−4 (EDT)
- ZIP codes: 22642
- FIPS code: 51-72935
- GNIS feature ID: 2629748

Skyland Estates is a census-designated place in Warren County, Virginia, United States, just north of Linden. As of the 2020 census, Skyland Estates had a population of 862.

== Demographics ==
Historical population
Census	Pop.	Note	%±
2010	830		—
2020	862		3.9%
U.S. Decennial Census; 2010 2020

Skyland Estates was first listed as a census designated place in the 2010 U.S. census.
