= Belmont Estates, Virginia =

Belmont Estates
- CDP
- Location of the Belmont Estates CDP within the Rockingham County

- Location within the Commonwealth of Virginia
- Coordinates: 38°26′47″N 78°55′22″W
- Country: United States
- State: Virginia
- County: Rockingham

Population (2010)
  - Total: 1,263
- Time zone: UTC−5 (Eastern (EST))
  - Summer (DST): UTC−4 (EDT)
- ZIP codes: 22801
- FIPS code: 51-06336
- GNIS feature ID: 2629752

Belmont Estates is a census-designated place in Rockingham County, Virginia, United States. As of the 2020 census, Belmont Estates had a population of 1,263. It is a suburban bedroom community just to the west of Harrisonburg.

== Demographics ==
Historical population
Census	Pop.	Note	%±
2010	1,263		—
2020	1,263		0.0%
U.S. Decennial Census; 2010 2020

Belmont Estates was first listed as a census designated place in the 2010 U.S. census.
