= Harriston, Virginia =

Harriston
- CDP
- Location within the Commonwealth of Virginia
- Coordinates: 38°12′41″N 78°49′45″W
- Country: United States
- State: Virginia
- County: Augusta

Area
  - Total: 1.6 sq mi (4.1 km^{2})
- Elevation: 1,224 ft (373 m)

Population (2020)
  - Total: 948
  - Density: 590/sq mi (230/km^{2})
- Time zone: UTC−5 (Eastern (EST))
  - Summer (DST): UTC−4 (EDT)
- ZIP codes: 24441
- FIPS code: 51-35640
- GNIS feature ID: 2630778

Harriston is a census-designated place in Augusta County, Virginia, United States. As of the 2020 census, Harriston had a population of 948.

== Demographics ==
Historical population
Census	Pop.	Note	%±
2010	909		—
2020	948		4.3%
U.S. Decennial Census; 2010 2020

Harriston was first listed as a census designated place in the 2010 U.S. census.
