= Shenandoah Retreat, Virginia =

- Census-designated place
- Location within Virginia Shenandoah Retreat (Virginia) Shenandoah Retreat (the United States)
- Coordinates: 39°8′12″N 77°51′44″W
- Country: United States
- State: Virginia
- County: Clarke

Area
  - Total: 1.6 sq mi (4.1 km^{2})
  - Land: 1.5 sq mi (3.9 km^{2})
  - Water: 0.077 sq mi (0.2 km^{2})
- Elevation: 550 ft (170 m)

Population (2010)
  - Total: 518
  - Density: 344/sq mi (132.8/km^{2})
- Time zone: UTC−5 (Eastern (EST))
  - Summer (DST): UTC−4 (EDT)
- ZIP code: 20135
- FIPS code: 51-71825
- GNIS feature ID: 2629751

Shenandoah Retreat is an unincorporated community and census-designated place in eastern Clarke County, Virginia, United States, on the eastern shore of the Shenandoah River. As of the 2020 census, Shenandoah Retreat had a population of 549.

== Demographics ==
Historical population
| Census | Pop. | Note | %± |
|---|---|---|---|
| 2010 | 518 | | — |
| 2020 | 549 | | 6.0% |
U.S. Decennial Census; 2010 2020

Shenandoah Retreat was first listed as a census designated place in the 2010 U.S. census.
