= Allisonia, Virginia =

Census-designated place in Pulaski County, Virginia, United States

Coordinates: 36°56′21″N 80°44′10″W

Allisonia is a census-designated place (CDP) in Pulaski County, Virginia, United States. As of the 2020 census, Allisonia had a population of 111.

== Demographics ==
Historical population
Census	Pop.	Note	%±
2010	117		—
2020	111		−5.1%
U.S. Decennial Census; 2010 2020

Allisonia was first listed as a census designated place in the 2010 U.S. census.
