= Captains Cove, Virginia =

- Census-designated place
- Location in Accomack County and the state of Virginia.

- Location within Virginia Location within the United States
- Coordinates: 38°0′1″N 75°25′2″W
- Country: United States
- State: Virginia
- County: Accomack
- Elevation: 20 ft (6.1 m)

Population (2020)
  - Total: 1,544
- Time zone: UTC−5 (Eastern (EST))
  - Summer (DST): UTC−4 (EDT)
- ZIP codes: 23356
- FIPS code: 51-12915
- GNIS feature ID: 2584822

Captains Cove is a census-designated place in Accomack County, Virginia, United States. Per the 2020 census, the population was 1,544. Known as Captain's Cove Golf & Yacht Club, it is a recreational community located on the west shore of Chincoteague Bay, bordering Maryland to the north. While numerous families with children live here, it is largely a retirement community, with a median age of 51 and the largest age group being 60–64.

== Geography ==
The CDP lies at an elevation of 20 feet.

== Demographics ==
Historical population
Census	Pop.	Note	%±
2010	1,042		—
2020	1,544		48.2%
U.S. Decennial Census; 2010 2020

Captains Cove was first listed as a census designated place in the 2010 U.S. census.

=== Racial and ethnic composition ===
Captains Cove CDP, Virginia – Racial and ethnic composition Note: the US Census treats Hispanic/Latino as an ethnic category. This table excludes Latinos from the racial categories and assigns them to a separate category. Hispanics/Latinos may be of any race.
Race / Ethnicity (NH = Non-Hispanic)	Pop 2010	Pop 2020	% 2010	% 2020
White alone (NH)	924	1,365	88.68%	88.41%
Black or African American alone (NH)	66	66	6.33%	4.27%
Native American or Alaska Native alone (NH)	0	1	0.00%	0.06%
Asian alone (NH)	11	13	1.06%	0.84%
Native Hawaiian or Pacific Islander alone (NH)	3	0	0.29%	0.00%
Other race alone (NH)	0	1	0.00%	0.06%
Mixed race or Multiracial (NH)	14	47	1.34%	3.04%
Hispanic or Latino (any race)	24	51	2.30%	3.30%
Total	1,042	1,544	100.00%	100.00%

=== 2020 census ===
As of the 2020 census, Captains Cove had a population of 1,544. The median age was 57.8 years. 15.3% of residents were under the age of 18 and 34.1% of residents were 65 years of age or older. For every 100 females there were 104.8 males, and for every 100 females age 18 and over there were 101.9 males age 18 and over.

0.0% of residents lived in urban areas, while 100.0% lived in rural areas.

There were 696 households in Captains Cove, of which 16.8% had children under the age of 18 living in them. Of all households, 61.8% were married-couple households, 13.8% were households with a male householder and no spouse or partner present, and 18.1% were households with a female householder and no spouse or partner present. About 23.8% of all households were made up of individuals and 14.2% had someone living alone who was 65 years of age or older.

There were 1,042 housing units, of which 33.2% were vacant. The homeowner vacancy rate was 1.3% and the rental vacancy rate was 6.1%.

== Golf and yacht club ==
Captain's Cove Golf & Yacht Club is located in Accomack County and is a recreational community located on the western shore of Chincoteague Bay, bordering Maryland to the north. Captain's Cove features a nine-hole golf course.
