= Deep Creek, Accomack County, Virginia =

Deep Creek, Virginia
- Census-designated place
- Location in Accomack County and the state of Virginia.

- Location within Virginia Location within the United States
- Coordinates: 37°45′47″N 75°45′18″W
- Country: United States
- State: Virginia
- County: Accomack
- Elevation: 3 ft (0.91 m)

Population (2020)
  - Total: 94
- Time zone: UTC-5 (Eastern (EST))
  - Summer (DST): UTC-4 (EDT)
- GNIS feature ID: 2584835

Deep Creek is a census-designated place (CDP) in Accomack County, Virginia, United States. Per the 2020 census, the population was 94.

== Geography ==
The CDP lies at an elevation of 3 feet.

== Demographics ==
Historical population
| Census | Pop. | Note | %± |
|---|---|---|---|
| 2010 | 115 | | — |
| 2020 | 94 | | −18.3% |
U.S. Decennial Census; 2010 2020

Deep Creek was first listed as a census designated place in the 2010 U.S. census.

=== 2020 census ===
Deep Creek CDP, Virginia – Racial and ethnic composition Note: the US Census treats Hispanic/Latino as an ethnic category. This table excludes Latinos from the racial categories and assigns them to a separate category. Hispanics/Latinos may be of any race.
| Race / Ethnicity (NH = Non-Hispanic) | Pop 2010 | Pop 2020 | % 2010 | % 2020 |
|---|---|---|---|---|
| White alone (NH) | 108 | 86 | 93.91% | 91.49% |
| Black or African American alone (NH) | 4 | 1 | 3.48% | 1.06% |
| Native American or Alaska Native alone (NH) | 0 | 2 | 0.00% | 2.13% |
| Asian alone (NH) | 0 | 1 | 0.00% | 1.06% |
| Native Hawaiian or Pacific Islander alone (NH) | 0 | 0 | 0.00% | 0.00% |
| Other race alone (NH) | 0 | 0 | 0.00% | 0.00% |
| Mixed race or Multiracial (NH) | 2 | 3 | 1.74% | 3.19% |
| Hispanic or Latino (any race) | 1 | 1 | 0.87% | 1.06% |
| Total | 115 | 94 | 100.00% | 100.00% |
