= List of high schools in Virginia =

This is a list of high schools in the U.S. state of Virginia.

== Accomack County ==
- Arcadia High School, Oak Hall
- Chincoteague High School, Chincoteague
- Nandua High School, Onley

== Albemarle County ==
=== Charlottesville ===
- Albemarle High School
- The Covenant School
- Monticello High School
- Murray High School
- Renaissance School
- St. Anne's-Belfield School
- Tandem Friends School

=== Crozet ===
- The Miller School of Albemarle
- Western Albemarle High School

== Alexandria City ==
- Alexandria City High School
- Bishop Ireton High School
- Episcopal High School
- St. Stephen's and St. Agnes School

== Alleghany County ==
- Alleghany High School, Covington

== Amelia County ==
=== Amelia Court House ===
- Amelia Academy
- Amelia County High School

== Amherst County ==
- Amherst County High School, Amherst

== Appomattox County ==
- Appomattox County High School, Appomattox

== Arlington County ==
=== Arlington ===
- Arlington Career Center
- Bishop Denis J. O'Connell High School
- H-B Woodlawn Secondary Program
- Wakefield High School
- Washington-Liberty High School
- Yorktown High School

== Augusta County ==
- Buffalo Gap High School, Swoope
- Fishburne Military School, Waynesboro
- Fort Defiance High School, Fort Defiance
- Wilson Memorial High School, Fishersville

=== Staunton ===
- Riverheads High School
- Stuart Hall School

=== Stuarts Draft ===
- Ridgeview Christian School
- Stuarts Draft High School

== Bath County ==
- Bath County High School, Hot Springs

== Bedford County ==
- Jefferson Forest High School, Forest
- Liberty High School, Bedford
- Staunton River High School, Moneta

== Bland County ==
- Bland County High School, Bland

== Botetourt County ==
- James River High School, Buchanan
- Lord Botetourt High School, Daleville

== Bristol City ==
- Virginia High School

== Brunswick County ==
=== Lawrenceville ===
- Brunswick High School
- Brunswick Academy

== Buchanan County ==
- Council High School, Council
- Grundy Senior High School, Grundy
- Hurley High School, Hurley
- Twin Valley High School, Pilgrim Knob

== Buckingham County ==
- Buckingham County High School, Buckingham

== Buena Vista City ==
- Parry McCluer High School

== Campbell County ==
- Altavista High School, Altavista
- Brookville High School, Lynchburg
- William Campbell High School, Naruna

=== Rustburg ===
- Campbell County Technical Center
- Rustburg High School

== Caroline County ==
- Caroline High School, Milford
- The Carmel School, Ruther Glen

== Carroll County ==
=== Hillsville ===
- Carroll County High School
- New Life Christian Academy

== Charles City County ==
- Charles City County High School, Charles City

== Charlotte County ==
- Randolph-Henry High School, Charlotte Court House

== Charlottesville City ==
- Charlottesville High School

== Chesapeake City ==
- Atlantic Shores Christian School
- Deep Creek High School
- Grassfield High School
- Great Bridge High School
- Greenbrier Christian Academy
- Hickory High School
- Indian River High School
- Oscar F. Smith High School
- StoneBridge School
- Western Branch High School

== Chesterfield County ==
- Matoaca High School, Matoaca

=== Chester ===
- Carver College & Career Academy
- Thomas Dale High School

=== Chesterfield ===
- Career & Technical Center @ Courthouse
- Lloyd C. Bird High School
- Richmond Christian School

=== Midlothian ===
- Al Madina School of Richmond
- Career & Technical Center @ Hull
- Clover Hill High School
- Cosby High School
- James River High School
- Manchester High School
- Midlothian High School

=== Richmond ===
- Banner Christian School
- Meadowbrook High School
- Monacan High School

== Clarke County ==
- Clarke County High School, Berryville

== Colonial Heights City ==
- Colonial Heights High School

== Craig County ==
- Craig County High School, New Castle

== Culpeper County ==
=== Culpeper ===
- Culpeper County High School
- Eastern View High School

== Cumberland County ==
- Cumberland High School, Cumberland

== Danville City ==
- Galileo Magnet High School
- George Washington High School
- Piedmont Governor's School for Mathematics, Science, and Technology
- Westover Christian Academy

== Dickenson County ==
- Ridgeview High School, Clintwood

== Dinwiddie County ==
- Dinwiddie County High School, Dinwiddie

== Emporia City ==
- Greensville County High School

== Essex County ==
=== Tappahannock ===
- Essex High School (Virginia)
- St. Margaret's School (Virginia)

== Fairfax City ==
- Fairfax High School
- Paul VI Catholic High School
- The New School of Northern Virginia

== Fairfax County ==
- Annandale High School, Annandale
- Centreville High School, Clifton
- Herndon High School, Herndon
- Lake Braddock Secondary School, Burke
- South County Secondary School, Lorton

=== Alexandria ===
- Bryant Alternative High School
- Thomas A. Edison High School
- Hayfield Secondary School
- Thomas Jefferson High School for Science and Technology
- Mount Vernon High School
- West Potomac High School

=== Chantilly ===
- Chantilly High School
- Westfield High School

=== Fairfax ===
- Fairfax High School
- Robinson Secondary School
- WT Woodson High School
- Trinity Christian School

=== Falls Church ===
- Falls Church High School
- Justice High School
- Marshall High School
- Trinity School at Meadow View

=== McLean ===
- Langley High School
- The Madeira School
- McLean High School
- Potomac School
- BASIS Independent McLean

=== Oakton ===
- Dominion Christian School
- Flint Hill School

=== Reston ===
- South Lakes High School
- Oak Hill Christian School

=== Springfield ===
- GW Community School
- John R. Lewis High School
- West Springfield High School

=== Vienna ===
- Fairfax Christian School
- James Madison High School
- Oakton High School

== City of, Falls Church ==
- Meridian High School (formerly George Mason High School)

== Fauquier County ==
- Fresta Valley Christian School, Marshall
- Kettle Run High School, Nokesville
- Liberty High School, Bealeton
- The Wakefield School, The Plains

=== Warrenton ===
- Fauquier High School
- Highland School
- Mountain Vista Governor's School

== Floyd County ==
- Floyd County High School, Floyd

== Fluvanna County ==
- Fluvanna High School, Palmyra
- Fork Union Military Academy, Fork Union

== Franklin City ==
- Franklin High School

== Franklin County ==
- Franklin County High School, Rocky Mount

== Frederick County ==
- Sherando High School, Stephens City
- Mountain Vista Governor's School, Middletown

=== Winchester ===
- James Wood High School
- Millbrook High School

== Fredericksburg City ==
- James Monroe High School

== Galax City ==
- Galax High School

== Giles County ==
- Giles High School, Pearisburg
- Jefferson Christian Academy, Ripplemead
- Narrows High School, Narrows

== Gloucester County ==
- Gloucester High School, Gloucester

== Goochland County ==
- Goochland High School, Goochland

=== Manakin ===
- Benedictine High School
- Saint Gertrude High School

== Grayson County ==
- Grayson County High School, Independence
- Oak Hill Academy, Mouth of Wilson

== Greene County ==
- Blue Ridge School, St. George
- William Monroe High School, Stanardsville

== Greensville County ==
- Greensville County High School, Emporia

== Halifax County ==
- Halifax County High School, South Boston

== Hampton City ==
- Bethel High School
- Bridgeport Academy
- Hampton Christian Schools
- Hampton High School
- Kecoughtan High School
- Phoebus High School

== Hanover County ==
- Patrick Henry High School, Ashland

=== Mechanicsville ===
- Atlee High School
- Christian School
- Hanover High School
- Mechanicsville High School

== Harrisonburg City ==
- Eastern Mennonite School
- Harrisonburg High School
- Rocktown High School

== Henrico County ==
- Highland Springs High School, Highland Springs
- The Steward School, Henrico

=== Glen Allen ===
- Deep Run High School
- Glen Allen High School

=== Richmond ===
- Douglas S. Freeman High School
- Henrico High School
- Hermitage High School
- J.R. Tucker High School
- Landmark Christian School
- Mills E. Godwin High School
- Varina High School

== Henry County ==
- Bassett High School, Bassett
- Magna Vista High School, Ridgeway
- Carlisle School, Private, Prep School, located in the Axton community.

== Highland County ==
- Highland High School, Monterey

== Hopewell City ==
- Hopewell High School
- West End Christian School

== Isle of Wight County ==
- Smithfield High School, Smithfield
- Windsor High School, Windsor
- Isle of Wight Academy, Isle of Wight

== James City County ==
NB: James City County and the City of Williamsburg operate a joint school system. All of the district's high schools have "Williamsburg" postal addresses, but are located in the County.

- Jamestown High School, Williamsburg
- Lafayette High School, Williamsburg
- Warhill High School, Williamsburg

== King and Queen County ==
- Central High School, King and Queen Court House

== King George County ==
- King George High School, King George

== King William County ==
- King William High School, King William
- West Point High School, West Point

== Lancaster County ==
- Lancaster High School, Lancaster

== Lee County ==
- Lee High School, Jonesville
- Thomas Walker High School, Ewing

== Loudoun County ==
- Foxcroft School, Middleburg
- Freedom High School, South Riding

=== Aldie ===
- John Champe High School
- Lightridge High School

=== Ashburn ===
- Briar Woods High School
- Broad Run High School
- Independence High School
- Ideal Schools High School
- Rock Ridge High School
- Stone Bridge High School

=== Leesburg ===
- Heritage High School
- Loudoun County High School
- Riverside High School
- Tuscarora High School

=== Purcellville ===
- Loudoun Valley High School
- Woodgrove High School

=== Sterling ===
- Dominion High School
- Park View High School
- Potomac Falls High School

== Louisa County ==
- Louisa County High School, Mineral

== Lunenburg County ==
- Central High School, Victoria

== Lynchburg City ==
- E. C. Glass High School
- Heritage High School
- Liberty Christian Academy
- Central Virginia Governor's School for Science and Technology
- Virginia Episcopal School

== Madison County ==
- Madison County High School, Madison
- Woodberry Forest School, Woodberry Forest

== Manassas City ==
- Osbourn High School
- Seton High School

== Manassas Park City ==
- Manassas Park High School

== Martinsville City ==
- Martinsville High School

== Mathews County ==
- Mathews High School, Mathews

== Mecklenburg County ==
- Mecklenburg County High School, Baskerville

== Middlesex County ==
- Christchurch School, Christchurch
- Middlesex High School, Saluda

== Montgomery County ==
- Auburn High School, Riner
- Blacksburg High School, Blacksburg
- Christiansburg High School, Christiansburg
- Eastern Montgomery High School, Elliston

== Nelson County ==
- Nelson County High School, Lovingston

== New Kent County ==
- New Kent High School, New Kent

== Newport News City ==
- Denbigh Baptist Christian School
- Denbigh High School
- Hampton Roads Academy
- Heritage High School
- Menchville High School
- Peninsula Catholic High School
- Warwick High School
- Woodside High School

== Norfolk City ==
- Granby High School
- The Hague School
- Lake Taylor High School
- Matthew Fontaine Maury High School
- Norfolk Academy
- Norfolk Christian High School
- Norfolk Collegiate School
- Norview High School
- Booker T. Washington High School

== Northampton County ==
- Broadwater Academy, Exmore
- Northampton High School, Eastville

== Northumberland County ==
- Northumberland High School], Heathsville

== Norton City ==
- John I. Burton High School

== Nottoway County ==
- Nottoway County High School, Nottoway
- Kenston Forest School, Blackstone

== Orange County ==
- Orange County High School, Orange

== Page County ==
- Page County High School, Shenandoah

=== Luray ===
- Luray High School
- Mt. Carmel Christian Academy

== Patrick County ==
- Patrick County High School, Stuart

== Petersburg City ==
- Petersburg High School
- Appomattox Regional Governor's School for the Arts And Technology

== Pittsylvania County ==
- Dan River High School, Ringgold
- Gretna High School, Gretna
- Tunstall High School, Dry Fork

=== Chatham ===
- Chatham Hall
- Chatham High School
- Hargrave Military Academy

== Poquoson City ==
- Poquoson High School

== Portsmouth City ==
- Churchland High School
- I.C. Norcom High School
- Manor High School
- Portsmouth Christian School

== Powhatan County ==
=== Powhatan ===
- Blessed Sacrament Huguenot
- Powhatan High School

== Prince Edward County ==
=== Farmville ===
- Fuqua School
- Prince Edward County High School

== Prince George County ==
- Prince George High School, Prince George

== Prince William County ==
- Battlefield High School, Haymarket
- Gainesville High School, Gainesville
- Gar-Field Senior High School, Dale City
- Quantico Middle/High School, Marine Corps Base Quantico

=== Dumfries ===
- Potomac High School
- Saint John Paul the Great Catholic High School

=== Manassas ===
- Charles J. Colgan Sr. High School
- Osbourn Park High School
- Unity Reed High School

=== Nokesville ===
- Brentsville District High School
- Patriot High School

=== Woodbridge ===
- Forest Park High School
- Freedom High School
- Hylton High School
- Richard Milburn High School
- Woodbridge High School

== Pulaski County ==
- Pulaski County High School, Dublin

== Radford City ==
- Radford High School

== Rappahannock County ==
- Rappahannock County High School, Washington
- Wakefield Country Day School, Huntly

== Richmond City ==
- Armstrong High School
- Collegiate School
- Franklin Military School
- George Wythe High School
- Huguenot High School
- John Marshall High School
- Maggie L. Walker Governor's School for Government and International Studies
- Northstar Academy
- Open High School
- Richmond Community High School
- St. Catherine's School
- St. Christopher's School
- Thomas Jefferson High School
- Trinity Episcopal High School

== Richmond County ==
- Rappahannock High School, Warsaw

== Roanoke City ==
- Blue Ridge Technical Academy
- Noel C. Taylor Learning Academy
- Patrick Henry High School
- Roanoke Catholic School
- Roanoke Valley Governor's School for Science and Technology
- William Fleming High School

== Roanoke County ==
- William Byrd High School, Vinton

=== Roanoke ===
- Cave Spring High School
- Hidden Valley High School
- North Cross School
- Northside High School
- Roanoke Valley Christian Schools

=== Salem ===
- Arnold R. Burton Technology Center
- Glenvar High School

== Rockbridge County ==
- Rockbridge County High School, Lexington

== Rockingham County ==
- Turner Ashby High School, Bridgewater
- Broadway High School, Broadway
- Spotswood High School, Penn Laird
- East Rockingham High School, Elkton

== Russell County ==
- Castlewood High School, Castlewood
- Honaker High School, Honaker
- Lebanon High School, Lebanon

== Salem City ==
- Salem High School

== Scott County ==
- Gate City High School, Gate City
- Rye Cove High School, Clinchport
- Twin Springs High School, Nickelsville

== Shenandoah County ==
- Mountain View High School, Quicksburg
- Shenandoah Valley Academy, New Market
- Strasburg High School, Strasburg

=== Woodstock ===
- Central High School
- Massanutten Military Academy

== Smyth County ==
- Chilhowie High School, Chilhowie
- Marion Senior High School, Marion
- Northwood High School, Saltville

== Southampton County ==
=== Courtland ===
- Southampton Academy
- Southampton High School

== Spotsylvania County ==
=== Fredericksburg ===
- Chancellor High School
- Faith Baptist School
- Fredericksburg Academy
- Fredericksburg Christian School
- Massaponax High School

=== Spotsylvania ===
- Courtland High School
- Riverbend High School
- Spotsylvania High School
- The Summit Academy

== Stafford County ==
=== Stafford ===
- Brooke Point High School
- Colonial Forge High School
- Grace Preparatory School
- Mountain View High School
- North Stafford High School
- Stafford Senior High School

== Staunton City ==
- Staunton High School

== Suffolk City ==
- King's Fork High School
- Lakeland High School
- Nansemond River High School
- Nansemond-Suffolk Academy

== Surry County ==
- Surry County High School, Dendron

== Sussex County ==
- Sussex Central High School, Sussex
- Tidewater Academy, Wakefield

== Tazewell County ==
- Graham High School, Bluefield
- Richlands High School, Richlands
- Tazewell High School, Tazewell

== Virginia Beach City ==
- Bayside High School
- Cape Henry Collegiate School
- Catholic High School
- Chesapeake Bay Academy
- First Colonial High School
- Frank W. Cox High School
- Floyd E. Kellam High School
- Green Run High School
- Kempsville High School
- Landstown High School
- Ocean Lakes High School
- Princess Anne High School
- Salem High School
- Tallwood High School

== Warren County ==
=== Front Royal ===
- Randolph-Macon Academy
- Skyline High School
- Warren County High School

== Washington County ==
- Abingdon High School, Abingdon
- John S. Battle High School, Bristol
- Patrick Henry High School, Glade Spring
- Holston High School, Damascus

== Waynesboro City ==
- Waynesboro High School

== Westmoreland County ==
- Armstead T. Johnson High School, Montross
- Colonial Beach High School, Colonial Beach
- Westmoreland High School, Montross

== Williamsburg City ==
NB: The City of Williamsburg and James City County operate a joint school system. None of the system's three public high schools are located in the City. See James City County for the public high schools.

- Walsingham Academy

== Winchester City ==
- John Handley High School

== Wise County ==
- Union High School, Big Stone Gap
- Eastside High School, Coeburn

=== Wise ===
- Central High School
- Wise County Christian School

== Wythe County ==
- Fort Chiswell High School, Max Meadows
- Rural Retreat High School, Rural Retreat
- George Wythe High School, Wytheville

== York County ==
- Bruton High School, Williamsburg

=== Yorktown ===
- Grafton High School
- Summit Christian Academy
- Tabb High School
- York High School

== See also ==
- List of school divisions in Virginia
