= STAR Transit (Virginia) =

Transit agency for the Eastern Shore of Virginia

Overview
- Owner: Accomack-Northampton Transportation District Commission
- Locale: Eastern Shore of Virginia (Accomack and Northampton counties)
- Transit type: Bus, On-Demand, Paratransit
- Number of lines: 7
- Annual ridership: 94,454 (2023)
- Headquarters: 21250 Cooperative Way; Tasley, Virginia, 23441
- Website: mystartransit.org

Operation
- Operator: Virginia Regional Transit

STAR Transit is a transit agency serving the two counties on the Eastern Shore of Virginia, Accomack and Northampton. STAR Transit provides local fixed route bus and paratransit services.

STAR Transit is operated by the Accomack-Northampton Transportation District Commission and overseen by a board of directors composed of appointees from each county's board of supervisors. STAR Transit's daily operations are managed by Virginia Regional Transit.

The fare for all fixed-route services is $0.50. Children under the age of 4 ride for free.

All STAR Transit buses carry bicycle racks, although cyclists are asked to seek permission from drivers before racking their bike.

STAR Transit does not operate on New Year's Day, Memorial Day, Independence Day, Labor Day, Thanksgiving Day, and Christmas.

== Routes ==
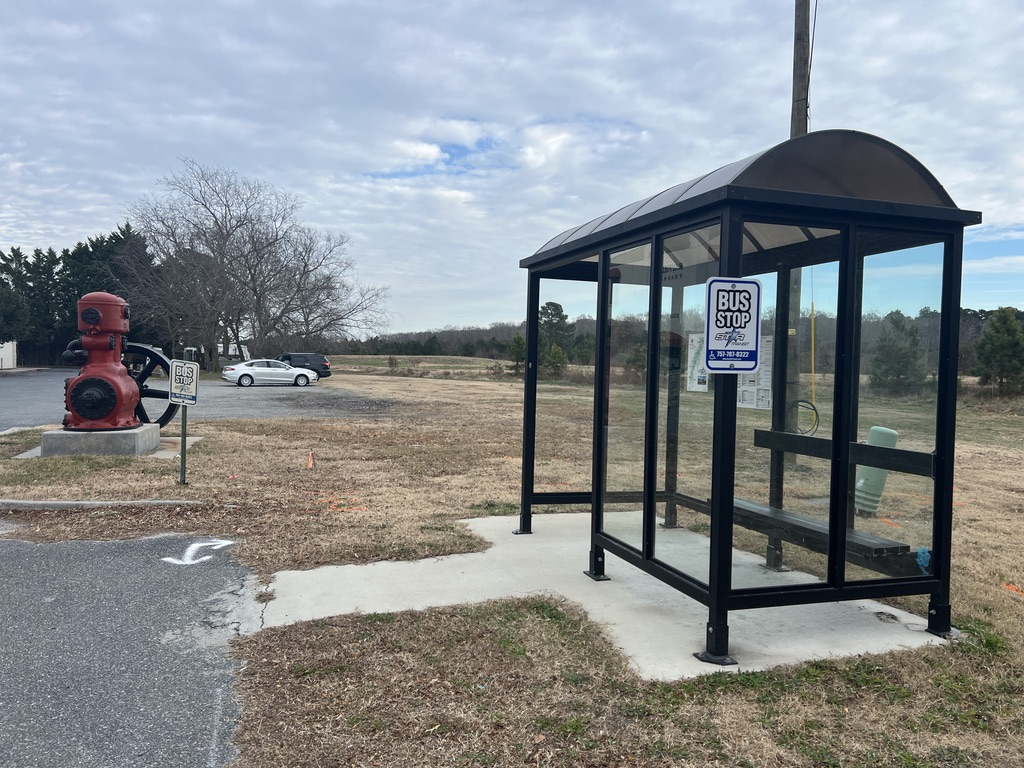
STAR Transit stop in Cape Charles, Virginia

=== Fixed route ===
- STAR Transit operates seven routes.

Route	Terminals	Major Stops
Red Line	Cape Charles → Onley	Cheriton; Eastville; Nassawaddox; Exmore; Belle Haven; Eastern Shore Community College (Melfa); Accomack County Airport (Melfa)
Purple Line	Onley → Cape Charles	Accomack County Airport (Melfa); Eastern Shore Community College (Melfa); Keller; Painter; Belle Haven; Exmore; Nassawaddox; Eastville; Cheriton
Blue Line	Onley → Oak Hall	Riverside Shore Memorial Hospital; Onancock; Accomac; Parksley; Bloxom; Nelsonia; Hallwood; Wattsville
Gold Line	Onley → Oak Hall	Wattsville; Hallwood; Nelsonia; Bloxom; Parksley; Accomac; Onancock; Riverside Shore Memorial Hospital
Yellow Line	Cape Charles (loop)	Cheriton; Cherrystone; Townsend; Kiptopeke State Park; Chesapeake Bay Bridge–Tunnel toll plaza
Silver Line	Oak Hall (loop)	New Church; Wattsville; Chincoteague; Wallops Flight Facility (main gate); Horntown
Route 13 Express	Cape Charles → Onley (north); Onley → Cape Charles (south)	Exmore

=== On-demand services ===
STAR Transit operates on-demand, paratransit services for Accomack County. The service, which costs $1.00, is available between 7:30am to 5:00pm from Monday to Friday. To schedule a pick-up, passengers must call the agency more than 24 hours in advance, during its weekday scheduling hours (10:00am to 3:00pm).

=== ADA services ===
STAR Transit will deviate from a fixed route as far as 0.75 miles to pick up ADA passengers, although they must call the day before to schedule a pick-up with the operator. All of STAR Transit vehicles are ADA accessible, with lifts for wheelchairs.

== See also ==
- Transportation in Hampton Roads
- Transportation in Virginia
- Shore Transit (transit provider for the Eastern Shore of Maryland)
