= Virginia State Route 187 =

State highway in Accomack County, Virginia, US

State Route 187

Route information
- Maintained by VDOT
- Length: 5.43 mi (8.74 km)
- Existed: 1933–present

Major junctions
- West end: SR 658 at Guilford
- SR 316 / SR 779 in Bloxom; US 13 in Nelsonia
- East end: SR 679 in Modest Town

Location
- Country: United States
- State: Virginia
- Counties: Accomack

Highway system
- Virginia Routes; Interstate; US; Primary; Secondary; Byways; History; HOT lanes
← SR 186	→ SR 188

State Route 187 (SR 187) is a primary state highway in the U.S. state of Virginia. The state highway runs 5.43 miles (8.74 km) from SR 658 at Guilford east to SR 679 in Modest Town. SR 187 connects U.S. Route 13 (US 13) with Bloxom in northern Accomack County.

== Route description ==
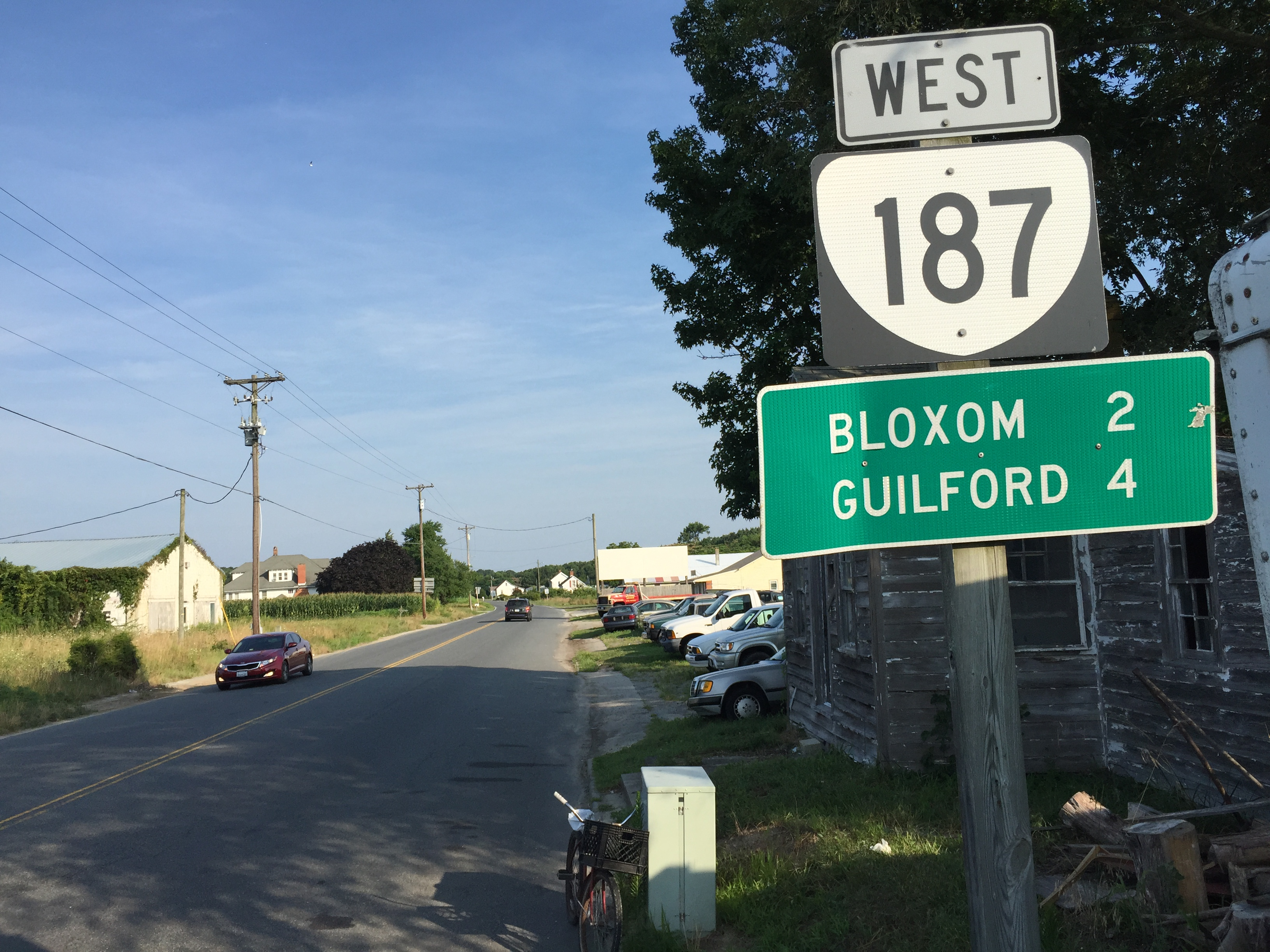
View west along SR 187 at US 13 in Nelsonia

SR 187 begins at an intersection with SR 658 (Winterville Road) in the village of Guilford. The state highway heads east as two-lane undivided Guilford Road to the town of Bloxom. SR 187 veers north along Shore Main Drive, then heads east again to intersect the northern end of SR 316 (Bayside Drive) and cross an inactive railroad line. The state highway curves north again, then veers east and follows Nelsonia Road through Macedonia to Nelsonia, where the highway meets US 13 (Lankford Highway). Before entering Modest Town, SR 187 reaches SR 679 (Metompkin Road) a short distance southwest of the community. SR 187 turns left onto Metompkin Road and passes through Modest Town before the designation ends just northeast of the community. SR 679 continues north as Metompkin Road.

== Major intersections ==
The entire route is in Accomack County.

Location	mi	km	Destinations	Notes
Guilford	0.00	0.00	SR 658 (Winterville Road)	Western terminus
Bloxom	1.51	2.43	SR 316 south (Bayside Drive) / SR 779 north (Bayside Drive) – Parksley	Northern terminus of SR 316
Nelsonia	3.70	5.95	US 13 (Lankford Highway) – Accomac, Pocomoke City	
Modest Town	5.43	8.74	SR 679 north (Metompkin Road)	Eastern terminus
1.000 mi = 1.609 km; 1.000 km = 0.621 mi

< SR 530	District 5 State Routes; 1928–1933	SR 532 >
