= Bloxom, Virginia =

- Town
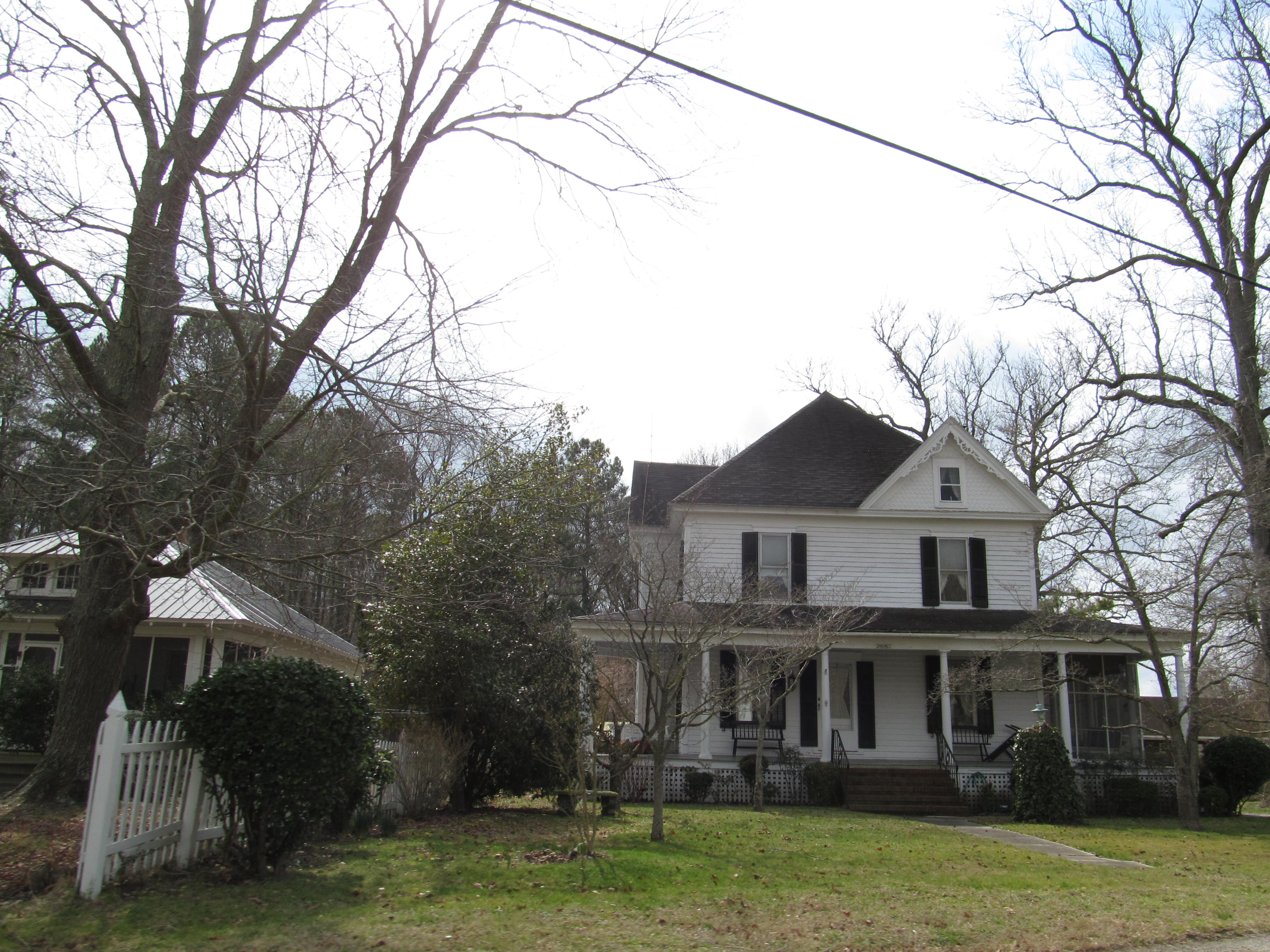
- Houses in Bloxom

- Location in Accomack County and the state of Virginia.
- Coordinates: 37°49′43″N 75°37′20″W
- Country: United States
- State: Virginia
- County: Accomack

Area
  - Total: 0.33 sq mi (0.86 km^{2})
  - Land: 0.33 sq mi (0.86 km^{2})
  - Water: 0 sq mi (0.00 km^{2})
- Elevation: 20 ft (6.1 m)

Population (2020)
  - Total: 387
  - Estimate (2019): 366
  - Density: 1,100.1/sq mi (424.77/km^{2})
- Time zone: UTC−5 (Eastern (EST))
  - Summer (DST): UTC−4 (EDT)
- ZIP code: 23308
- Area codes: 757, 948
- FIPS code: 51-08120
- GNIS feature ID: 1492593
- Website: www.bloxom.org

Bloxom is a town in Accomack County, Virginia, United States. As of the 2020 census, Bloxom had a population of 387.

== Geography ==
Bloxom is located at 37°49′43″N 75°37′20″W (37.828512, −75.622338).

According to the United States Census Bureau, the town has a total area of 0.3 square mile (0.8 km^{2}), all land.

== Demographics ==
Historical population
| Census | Pop. | Note | %± |
|---|---|---|---|
| 1960 | 349 | | — |
| 1970 | 391 | | 12.0% |
| 1980 | 407 | | 4.1% |
| 1990 | 357 | | −12.3% |
| 2000 | 395 | | 10.6% |
| 2010 | 387 | | −2.0% |
| 2020 | 387 | | 0.0% |
U.S. Decennial Census

As of the census of 2000, there were 395 people, 160 households, and 99 families living in the town. The population density was 1,253.7 people per square mile (476.6/km^{2}). There were 175 housing units at an average density of 555.4 per square mile (211.1/km^{2}). The racial makeup of the town was 81.27% White, 6.58% African American, 0.51% Native American, 10.13% from other races, and 1.52% from two or more races. Hispanic or Latino of any race were 14.18% of the population.

There were 160 households, out of which 23.1% had children under the age of 18 living with them, 43.8% were married couples living together, 13.1% had a female householder with no husband present, and 38.1% were non-families. 30.6% of all households were made up of individuals, and 9.4% had someone living alone who was 65 years of age or older. The average household size was 2.47 and the average family size was 2.94.

The age distribution was 21.8% under the age of 18, 12.2% from 18 to 24, 24.3% from 25 to 44, 27.1% from 45 to 64, and 14.7% who were 65 years of age or older. The median age was 38 years. For every 100 females, there were 98.5 males. For every 100 females age 18 and over, there were 99.4 males.

The median income for a household in the town was $25,000, and the median income for a family was $33,125. Males had a median income of $23,750 versus $15,625 for females. The per capita income for the town was $13,337. About 15.4% of families and 14.4% of the population were below the poverty line, including 21.3% of those under age 18 and 16.4% of those age 65 or over.

== Transportation ==
=== Major highway ===
- SR 187

=== Public transportation ===
STAR Transit provides public transit services, linking Bloxom with Onley, Oak Hall, and other communities in Accomack and Northampton counties.
