= Kenston Forest School =

School in Virginia, United States

Location
- 75 Ridge Road; Blackstone, VA 23824; United States; 37°3′53.8″N 77°59′46.5″W

Information
- Type: Private K–12, co-educational
- Motto: Every Child Known and Valued
- Established: 1966
- Oversight: Lunenburg – Nottoway Educational Foundation
- Headmaster: Lori Bacon
- Faculty: 60 (FTE)
- Grades: Pre-K–12th
- Enrollment: 411 (2021–2022)
- Student to teacher ratio: 12:1
- Language: American English
- Campus: 79 acres (0.31km^{2})
- Colors: Forest Green & Green Bay Gold (Green and Gold)
- Athletics: Football (independent), Basketball, Baseball, Volleyball, Golf, Soccer, Cross Country, & Softball
- Athletics conference: VISAA Division III; Virginia Colonial Conference Central Region
- Nickname: Kavaliers
- Rival: Brunswick Academy
- Accreditation: SACS
- Tuition: Kindergarten: $6500; Grades 1–7: $8,150; Grades 8–12: $8,550
- Website: Kenston Forest School

Kenston Forest School (KFS) is a college-preparatory school located in Blackstone, Virginia, United States.

Kenston Forest School serves students from ten surrounding counties, one independent city, and one county in North Carolina. In addition to educating grades pre-kindergarten through twelve, the school has an Early Learning Program that is licensed by the State of Virginia. The school is accredited through the Southern Association of Colleges and Schools and the Virginia Independent Schools Association.

== History ==
Kenston Forest School was founded in 1966 by the Lunenburg-Nottoway Educational Foundation. The school was built on 28.5 acres of land outside of Blackstone and enrolled 175 students by 1966. It was part of an effort, echoed in many southern communities, to establish private all-white schools (known as "segregation academies) to avoid the integration of the public school system. Over the intervening decades, ironically, many of those segregation academies have become racially integrated.

The development of an aggressive long range master plan and a successful capital campaign led to the construction of a new upper school building in 1999 as well as long overdue improvements to existing facilities including paint, tile, carpet, technology upgrades and air conditioning. The new upper school building included a well equipped computer lab, science lab and five additional classrooms. In 2004, the school received a new press box and acquired 53 acres. Phase II of the master plan included construction of a modern 10,000 square foot building in 2005 with nine classrooms to house the early learning program, after school program, summer program, kindergarten, and first grade. This facility also included a playground, office space, kitchen and cafeteria. The original gymnasium and mainstage underwent significant renovation in late 2007 and the basketball court was dedicated as “Alumni Court” on January 7, 2008. Enrollment had climbed significantly over the prior decade. Academic and other opportunities for students had increased, and the grounds and facilities had dramatically grown and improved.

The name "Kenston" originates from a merging of the town names "Kenbridge" and "Blackstone." Kenston Forest School originally enrolled students in grades eight through twelve, acting as a high school for students from both the Kenbridge Day School and the Blackstone Day School, two private lower schools in the area. In 1981, after declining numbers of enrollment in all of these schools, the three decided to merge to form Kenston Forest School as it is today, one non-discriminatory, nonprofit school for grades pre-k through twelve. The school is still overseen by The Lunenburg – Nottoway Educational Foundation, which is governed by an appointed Board of Directors.

== Athletics ==
The Kenston Forest Kavaliers and Lady Kavaliers compete as a member of the Virginia Colonial Conference in all sports except for football in the Virginia Independent Schools Athletic Association (VISAA) Division III. KFS fields fifteen sports teams, five junior varsity, and ten varsity sports teams. Kenston has four varsity boys teams, four varsity girls teams, and two mixed-gender varsity sports teams. Kenston's boys' sports include eight-man football, basketball, cross country, and baseball. Kenston's girls' sports include basketball, cross country, volleyball, and softball. Kenston's mixed-gender sports are golf and soccer. In 2018, the football team joined the VISFL, a league that sponsors 8 man football for Virginia schools unable to field 11 man teams.

=== Rivalries ===
==== Brunswick Academy ====
Kenston Forest has a long standing rivalry with conference member Brunswick Academy.

=== VCC Conference/Tournament Championships ===
KFS has won conference and tournament championships in the following sports.

- Soccer – 2007, 2008, 2009, 2010, 2011
- Volleyball – 2019
- Golf – 2012, 2013, 2014, 2015, 2016, 2017, 2018
- Football – 1989, 2021

=== VISAA State Championships ===
KFS has won state championships in the following sports.

- Football – 1991, 2019
- Softball – (2011, 2012, 2013, 2014, 2019) Division III.

Other VCC member schools include Banner Christian School, Blessed Sacrament Huguenot, Brunswick Academy, Richmond Christian School, Christchurch School, Fuqua School, Isle of Wight Academy (associate member), Southampton Academy, and Tidewater Academy.

KFS's hashtag is #GTDBAK (Great Day to be a Kavalier) which is primarily used for promotional events and social media.
