= Wattsville, Virginia =

- Census-designated place
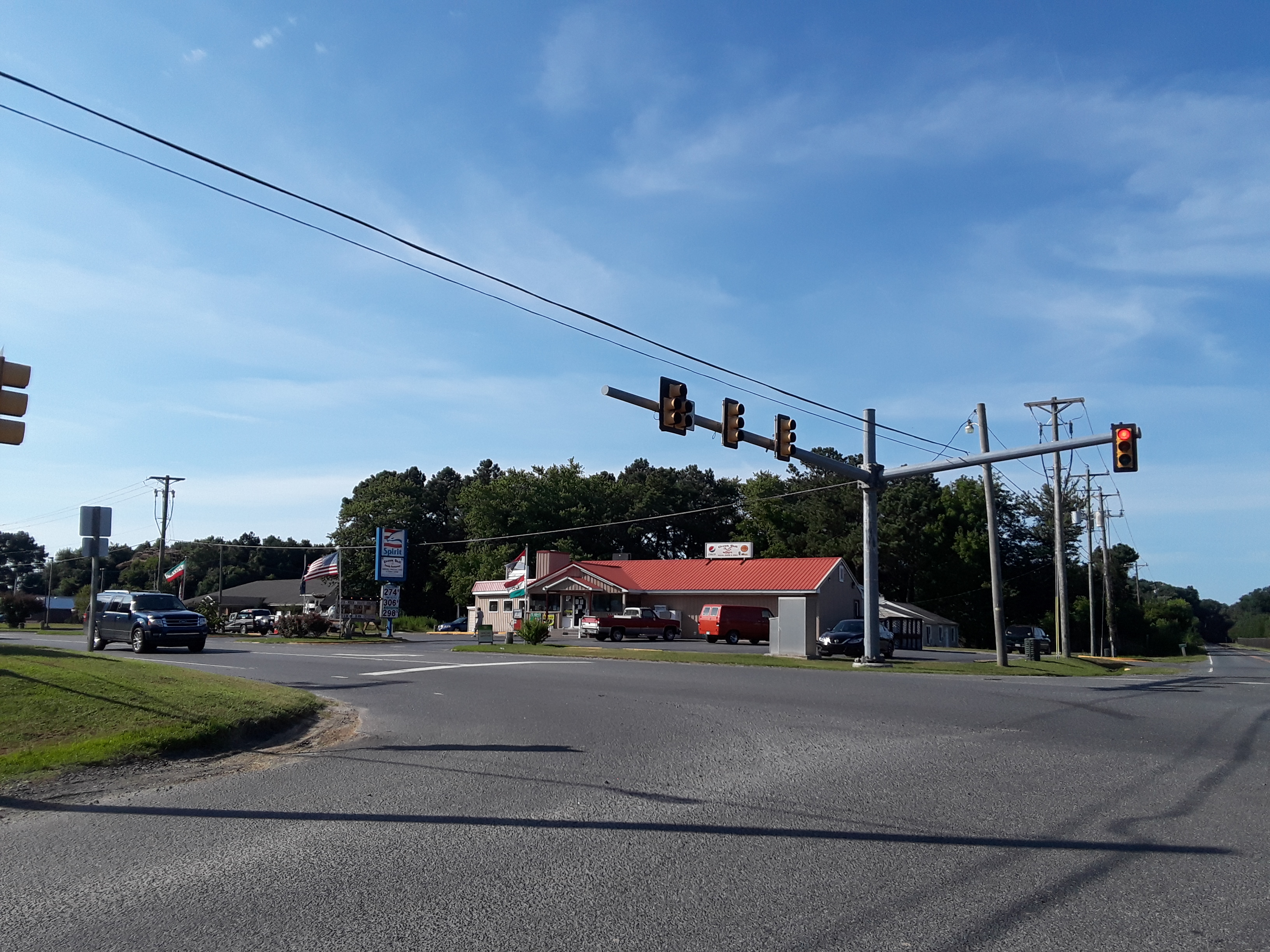
- Businesses in Wattsville, July 2018

- Location in Accomack County and the state of Virginia.
- Coordinates: 37°55′48″N 75°29′40″W
- Country: United States
- State: Virginia
- County: Accomack
- Elevation: 3 ft (0.91 m)

Population (2020)
  - Total: 1,341
- Time zone: UTC−5 (Eastern (EST))
  - Summer (DST): UTC−4 (EDT)
- FIPS code: 51-48776
- GNIS feature ID: 2584935

Wattsville is a census-designated place (CDP) in Accomack County, Virginia, United States. It was first listed as a CDP in 2010. As of the 2020 census, it had a population of 1,341.

== Geography ==
It lies at an elevation of 3 feet.

== Demographics ==
Historical population
| Census | Pop. | Note | %± |
|---|---|---|---|
| 2010 | 1,128 | | — |
| 2020 | 1,341 | | 18.9% |
U.S. Decennial Census; 2010 2020

Wattsville was first listed as a census designated place in the 2010 U.S. census.

=== 2020 census ===
Wattsville CDP, Virginia – Racial and ethnic composition Note: the US Census treats Hispanic/Latino as an ethnic category. This table excludes Latinos from the racial categories and assigns them to a separate category. Hispanics/Latinos may be of any race.
| Race / Ethnicity (NH = Non-Hispanic) | Pop 2010 | Pop 2020 | % 2010 | % 2020 |
|---|---|---|---|---|
| White alone (NH) | 723 | 832 | 64.10% | 62.04% |
| Black or African American alone (NH) | 313 | 356 | 27.75% | 26.55% |
| Native American or Alaska Native alone (NH) | 5 | 6 | 0.44% | 0.45% |
| Asian alone (NH) | 12 | 11 | 1.06% | 0.82% |
| Pacific Islander alone (NH) | 3 | 0 | 0.27% | 0.00% |
| Some Other Race alone (NH) | 2 | 7 | 0.18% | 0.52% |
| Mixed Race or Multi-Racial (NH) | 29 | 54 | 2.57% | 4.03% |
| Hispanic or Latino (any race) | 41 | 75 | 3.63% | 5.59% |
| Total | 1,128 | 1,341 | 100.00% | 100.00% |

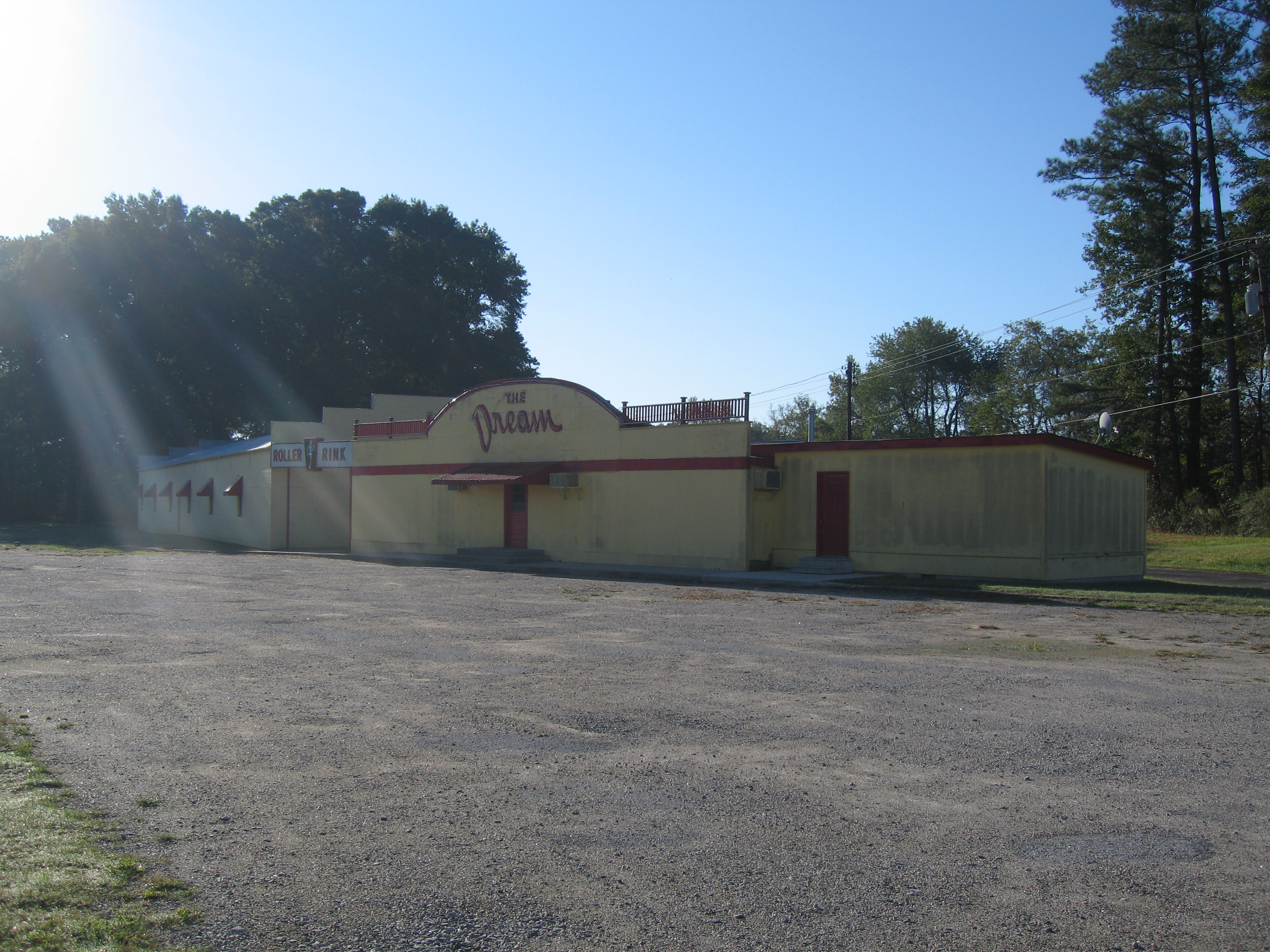
Dream Roller Rink, now abandoned, in Wattsville in 2008

== Transportation ==
=== Major highway ===
- SR 175

=== Public transportation ===
STAR Transit provides public transit services, linking Wattsville with Onley, Oak Hall, and other communities in Accomack and Northampton counties on the Eastern Shore.
