= Northern Neck District =

- Conference: Virginia High School League
- No. of teams: 6
- Headquarters: Northern Neck, Virginia
- Region: Class 1, Region A

The Northern Neck District is a high school athletic conference that competes in Class 1, Region A of the Virginia High School League (VHSL). It comprises high schools located in the historic Northern Neck region of Virginia, a peninsula bounded by the Potomac and Rappahannock Rivers and the Chesapeake Bay. The district's schools are primarily rural and small in enrollment.

== Geography and classification ==
The Northern Neck District belongs to Region A within VHSL’s current classification system, alongside:

- Eastern Shore District
- Tidewater District (VHSL)
- Tri-Rivers District

All schools in the district currently compete in VHSL Class 1, the smallest classification for Virginia public high schools based on enrollment.

== History ==
The Northern Neck District has long been a distinct athletic grouping within the VHSL, representing the small public schools of Virginia’s Northern Neck area. The schools in this district maintain competitive athletic programs despite smaller student populations. Football and basketball, in particular, enjoy strong local followings and historic rivalries.

== Member schools ==
As of 2026, the Northern Neck District includes the following six schools:

| School | Location | Mascot | Colors |
|---|---|---|---|
| Essex High School (Virginia) | Tappahannock, Essex County | Trojans | Maroon and Gold |
| Lancaster High School (Virginia) | Lancaster, Lancaster County | Red Devils | Red and White |
| Northumberland High School | Heathsville, Northumberland County | Indians | Green and Gold |
| Rappahannock High School | Warsaw, Richmond County | Raiders | Black and Red |
| Westmoreland High School (Virginia) | Montross, Westmoreland County | Eagles | Navy and Gold |
| Colonial Beach High School | Colonial Beach, Westmoreland County | Drifters | Maroon and White |

== Rivalries ==
Rivalries are a central part of athletics in the Northern Neck. Key matchups include:

- Essex vs. Westmoreland – A regional football rivalry with playoff implications.
- Northumberland vs. Lancaster – Known for intense basketball competition.
- Rappahannock vs. Colonial Beach – Local pride at stake across multiple sports.

== Academics and activities ==
In addition to athletic competition, schools in the Northern Neck District regularly compete in VHSL academic events such as forensics, debate, scholastic bowl, and one-act plays. Participation in band, 4-H, and agriculture clubs is also common due to the region’s rural character.

== Transportation and challenges ==
Schools in the district face relatively short travel times compared to districts like the Eastern Shore, but long distances are still required for postseason play and inter-region matchups. Funding and maintaining athletic facilities at small rural schools also remain challenges.

== See also ==
- Virginia High School League
- Eastern Shore District
- Tidewater District (VHSL)
- Tri-Rivers District
- List of high schools in Virginia
- Category:High school sports in Virginia
