= Eastern Shore District =

Virginia high school athletic conference

The Eastern Shore District is an American high school conference that competes in A Region A of the Virginia High School League. The district is located in the Eastern Shore of Virginia which is isolated in the Delmarva Peninsula from the rest of the Commonwealth which include all the public schools in Accomack County and Northampton County. Though all of the district's members are currently in Group A, it is not uncommon to see multiple members play in Group AA from time to time when the district offers a combination format.

The schools in the Eastern Shore District compete with the schools in the A Northern Neck District, A Tidewater District, and the A Tri-Rivers District in A Region A.

== Member schools ==
- Arcadia High School of Oak Hall, Virginia
- Chincoteague High School of Chincoteague, Virginia
- Nandua High School of Onley, Virginia
- Northampton High School of Eastville, Virginia
