= Tidewater Conference of Independent Schools =

The Tidewater Conference of Independent Schools (TCIS) is a 10-team athletic conference in the Tidewater region of Virginia. Prior to the 2004 school year, the TCIS had tournaments for JV and Middle School teams as well as Varsity. Now, the TCIS only holds tournaments for Varsity teams.

Schools in the conference advance to state championships governed by the Virginia Independent Schools Athletic Association (the Virginia High School League is open only to public schools).

== Sports ==
The TCIS hold tournaments for 18 different sports including:

- Boys Volleyball
- Girls Volleyball
- Boys Soccer
- Girls Soccer
- Cross Country
- Wrestling
- Boys Basketball
- Girls Basketball
- Swimming
- Girls Softball
- Boys Baseball
- Boys Lacrosse
- Girls Lacrosse
- Boys Tennis
- Girls Tennis
- Track
- Golf
- Girls Field Hockey
- Cheerleading
- Sailing

== Teams ==
- Cape Henry Collegiate School
- Catholic High School
- Greenbrier Christian Academy (former member, now member of Metropolitan Athletic Conference)
- Hampton Roads Academy
- Nansemond-Suffolk Academy
- Norfolk Academy
- Norfolk Christian Schools
- Norfolk Collegiate School
- Peninsula Catholic High School
- The Steward School
- Walsingham Academy

== 2020-2025 Winners ==
| Sport | Winner | Runner Up | Score/Points (If Applicable) |
|---|---|---|---|
| Boys Soccer | Norfolk Academy | Catholic high school | 4-1 |

== 2014-2015 Winners ==
| Sport | Winner | Runner Up | Score/Points (If Applicable) |
|---|---|---|---|
| Boys Cross Country | Peninsula Catholic | Norfolk Academy | |

== 2012-2013 Winners ==
| Sport | Winner | Runner Up | Score/Points (If Applicable) |
|---|---|---|---|
| Boys Soccer | Cape Henry Collegiate | Norfolk Academy | 2-1 |
| Girls Volleyball | Hampton Roads Academy | Norfolk Academy | 3-0 |
| Boys Basketball | Cape Henry Collegiate | Walsingham | 57-54 |
| Girls Basketball | Cape Henry Collegiate | Hampton Roads Academy | 63-47 |
| Girls Soccer | Norfolk Academy | Cape Henry | 2-0 |
| Boys Lacrosse | Cape Henry Collegiate | Norfolk Academy | 10-9 (OT) |
| Baseball | Cape Henry Collegiate | Greenbrier Christian | 1-0 |
| Girls Lacrosse | Norfolk Academy | Cape Henry Collegiate | 12-8 |
| Golf | Cape Henry Collegiate | | |

== 2010-2011 Winners ==
| Sport | Winner | Runner Up | Score/Points (If Applicable) |
|---|---|---|---|
| Boys Soccer | Cape Henry Collegiate | Norfolk Academy | 3-0 |
| Field Hockey | Hampton Roads Academy | Cape Henry Collegiate | 2-1 |
| Girls Tennis | Cape Henry Collegiate | Norfolk Academy | 61-58 |
| Boys Volleyball | Cape Henry Collegiate | Greenbrier Christian | 3-1 |
| Girls Volleyball | Cape Henry Collegiate | Nansemond-Suffolk | 3-0 |
| Boys Basketball | Norfolk Christian | Cape Henry Collegiate | 85-77(OT) |
| Girls Basketball | Cape Henry Collegiate | Norfolk Christian | 64-60 |
| Wrestling | Cape Henry Collegiate | Norfolk Collegiate | 290-245 |

*Cape Henry Collegiate went on to win the state VIS State Championship in Girls Volleyball, Boys Volleyball, Girls Basketball and Field Hockey

== 2009-2010 Winners ==
| Sport | Winner | Runner Up | Score/Points (If Applicable) |
|---|---|---|---|
| Boys Soccer | Norfolk Collegiate | Walsingham | 2-1 |
| Field Hockey | Norfolk Academy | Cape Henry | 3-2 (OT) |
| Girls Tennis | Hampton Roads Academy | Cape Henry/Norfolk Academy | 61-58 |
| Boys Cross Country | Peninsula Catholic | Norfolk Collegiate | 64-73 |
| Girls Cross Country | Norfolk Academy | Peninsula Catholic | 42-68 |
| Boys Volleyball | Cape Henry | Greenbrier Christian | 3-0 |
| Girls Volleyball | Cape Henry | Nansemond-Suffolk | 3-0 |
| Boys Swimming | Norfolk Academy | Cape Henry | 390-389 |
| Boys Basketball | Norfolk Christian | Cape Henry | 68-65 |
| Girls Swimming | Norfolk Academy | Cape Henry | 436-304 |
| Cheerleading | Norfolk Collegiate | Norfolk Christian | |
| Wrestling | Cape Henry | Norfolk Collegiate | 248-203.5 |

== 2008-2009 Winners ==
| Sport | Winner | Runner Up | Score/Points (If Applicable) |
|---|---|---|---|
| Boys Soccer | Norfolk Academy | Norfolk Collegiate | 2-0 |
| Girls Cross Country | Norfolk Academy | Peninsula Catholic | 34-50 |
| Boys Cross Country | Norfolk Collegiate | Peninsula Catholic | 36-51 |
| Field Hockey | Cape Henry | Walsingham | 3-1 |
| Girls Tennis | Cape Henry | Hampton Roads Academy | 61-57 |
| Girls Volleyball | Cape Henry | Norfolk Collegiate | 3-1 |
| Boys Volleyball | Cape Henry | Norfolk Collegiate | 3-0 |
| Wrestling | Cape Henry | Norfolk Academy | 287.5-201 |
| Girls Swimming | Norfolk Academy | Bishop Sullivan | 328-301 |
| Boys Swimming | Norfolk Academy | Cape Henry | 432-370.5 |
| Cheerleading | Norfolk Christian | Norfolk Collegiate | |
| Girls Basketball | Norfolk Collegiate | Hampton Roads Academy | 65-45 |
| Boys Basketball | Norfolk Christian | Norfolk Collegiate | 49-40 |
| Girls Track | Norfolk Academy | Norfolk Collegiate | 173-105 |
| Boys Track | Norfolk Academy | Bishop Sullivan | 139-117 |
| Boys Lacrosse | Norfolk Academy | Nansemond-Suffolk | 15-6 |
| Girls Lacrosse | Bishop Sullivan | Cape Henry | 16-9 |
| Girls Soccer | Norfolk Academy | Bishop Sullivan | 2-0 |
| Boys Tennis | Cape Henry | Norfolk Academy | 67-65 |
| Golf | Cape Henry | Greenbrier Christian | 621-633 |
| Baseball | Nansemond-Suffolk | Cape Henry | 5-4 |
| Softball | Greenbrier Christian | Nansemond-Suffolk | 4-3 |

== 2007-2008 Winners ==
| Sport | Winner | Runner Up | Score/Points (If Applicable) |
|---|---|---|---|
| Girls Tennis | Norfolk Collegiate* | Norfolk Academy | 62-60 |
| Boys Cross Country | Norfolk Collegiate | Bishop Sullivan | 40-86 |
| Girls Cross Country | Peninsula Catholic | Norfolk Academy | 35-54 |
| Field Hockey | Norfolk Academy | Cape Henry | |
| Boys Soccer | Norfolk Academy | Cape Henry | |
| Boys Volleyball | Peninsula Catholic | Norfolk Collegiate | |
| Girls Volleyball | Norfolk Academy | Walsingham | |
| Boys Swimming | Norfolk Academy | Hampton Roads Academy* | |
| Girls Swimming | Nansemond-Suffolk | Norfolk Academy | 386-324 |
| Wrestling | Cape Henry | Norfolk Collegiate | |
| Cheerleading | Norfolk Christian | Norfolk Collegiate | |
| Girls Basketball | Walsingham* | Norfolk Collegiate | 66-64 (OT) |
| Boys Basketball | Cape Henry | Hampton Roads Academy | |
| Boys Track | Norfolk Academy | Nansemond-Suffolk | |
| Girls Track | Norfolk Academy | Peninsula Catholic | |
| Girls Soccer | Norfolk Academy | Bishop Sullivan | |
| Boys Tennis | Cape Henry | Norfolk Academy | 65-61 |
| Baseball | Greenbrier Christian* | Norfolk Academy | |
| Softball | Greenbrier Christian | Nansemond-Suffolk | |
| Girls Lacrosse | Cape Henry | Bishop Sullivan | |
| Boys Lacrosse | Norfolk Academy | Bishop Sullivan | |
| Golf | Norfolk Academy | Hampton Roads Academy | |

- Norfolk Collegiate was also the VIS (Virginia Independent Schools) Division II champion in girls tennis.
- Hampton Roads Academy was also the VIS Division II champion in boys swimming.
- Walsingham was also the VIS Division II champion in girls basketball.
- Greenbrier Christian was also the VIS Division II champion in baseball.

== 2006-2007 Winners ==
| Sport | Winner | Runner Up | Score/Points (If Applicable) |
|---|---|---|---|
| Boys Cross Country | Norfolk Collegiate | Bishop Sullivan Catholic High | |
| Girls Volleyball | Nansemond-Suffolk Academy | Walsingham Academy | |
| Boys Volleyball | Greenbrier Christian Academy | Cape Henry Collegiate | |
| Girls Cross Country | Norfolk Academy | Peninsula Catholic | |
| Wrestling | Norfolk Collegiate | Cape Henry Collegiate School | |
| Boys Basketball | Walsingham Academy | Bishop Sullivan Catholic High | |
| Girls Basketball | Norfolk Collegiate | Walsingham Academy | |
| Boys Swimming | Hampton Roads Academy | Norfolk Academy | |
| Girls Swimming | Norfolk Academy | Hampton Roads Academy | |
| Girls Tennis | Hampton Roads Academy | Norfolk Collegiate | |
| Boys Lacrosse | Norfolk Academy | Cape Henry Collegiate School | |
| Girls Lacrosse | Cape Henry Collegiate School | Bishop Sullivan Catholic | |
