= Cecil Gray (American football) =

American football player (born 1968)

No. 71, 75, 66
- Position: Offensive tackle

Personal information
- Born: February 16, 1968 (age 58); New York, New York, U.S.
- Listed height: 6 ft 4 in (1.93 m)
- Listed weight: 305 lb (138 kg)

Career information
- High school: Archbishop Molloy (Queen, New York); Norfolk Catholic (Norfolk, Virginia)
- College: North Carolina
- NFL draft: 1990: 9th round, 244th overall pick

Career history
- Philadelphia Eagles (1990–1991); Green Bay Packers (1992); New Orleans Saints (1993); Indianapolis Colts (1993–1994); Oakland Raiders (1995)*; Arizona Cardinals (1995)
- * Offseason or practice squad member only

Awards and highlights
- First-team All-ACC (1989)

Career NFL statistics
- Games played: 45
- Games started: 14
- Stats at Pro Football Reference

Cecil Tarik Gray (born February 16, 1968) is an American former professional football player who was an offensive tackle and defensive end for six seasons in the National Football League (NFL). He played college football for the North Carolina Tar Heels and was selected by the Philadelphia Eagles in the ninth round of the 1990 NFL draft. He played in the NFL for the Eagles from 1990 to 1991, the Green Bay Packers in 1992, the New Orleans Saints in 1993, the Indianapolis Colts from 1993 to 1994, and the Arizona Cardinals in 1995.

Gray was placed on the injured reserve list by the Eagles on September 11, 1991.

He graduated from Norfolk Catholic High School in Norfolk, Virginia in 1986.
