= Walter Balderson =

American television editor (1926–2023)

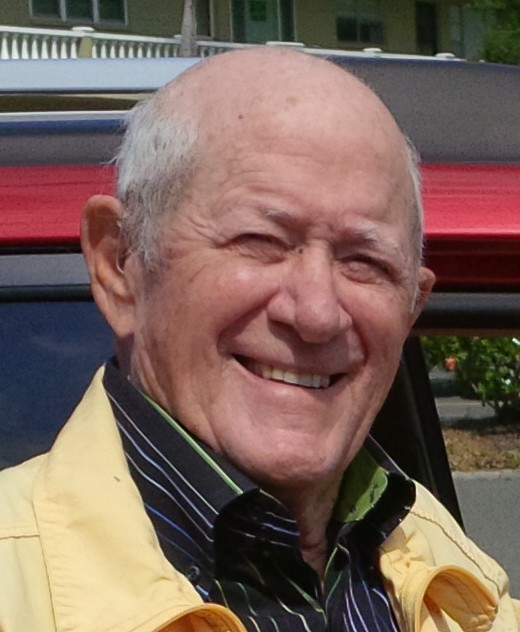
- Balderson in 2016
- Born: Walter Tyler Balderson; September 19, 1926; Farmers Fork, Virginia, U.S.
- Died: July 29, 2023 (aged 96)
- Education: Central Technical Institute
- Occupations: Video engineer and editor
- Years active: 1949–1984
- Employer: NBC
- Known for: Emmy Award
- Parent(s): Ella and Cleveland Balderson

Walter Tyler Balderson (September 19, 1926 – July 29, 2023) was an American television editor and video engineer, who participated in the advent of color television beginning in the early 1950s and later was one of the first editors to use videotape for instant replay on network television sports events. Nominated for three Emmys during his 35-year career with NBC (1949–1984), Balderson won an Emmy in 1977 for "Outstanding Individual Achievement", in recognition of his work on NBC's The First 50 Years special program.

== Early years ==
Walter Tyler Balderson was born in Farmers Fork, near Montross, Virginia, on September 19, 1926. The youngest of nine children, he attended Washington and Lee High School until 1944, when he joined the Navy during World War II. After serving aboard the destroyer USS George K. MacKenzie in 1945–1946, he studied radio and television engineering at Central Technical Institute in Kansas City, Missouri.

== Broadcasting career ==
Balderson began his broadcasting career in 1949, as an engineer with NBC owned-and-operated radio station WRC-AM in Washington, D. C. Desiring to be a part of the nascent television industry at the network level, he moved in 1950 to NBC's New York City headquarters studios at 30 Rockefeller Plaza to work as an engineer and cameraman, spanning news, entertainment, and sports programming.

In addition to such New York-originated live entertainment shows of the period as Milton Berle's Texaco Star Theater, Balderson covered news events such as the inauguration of Dwight D. Eisenhower as President of the U.S. in 1953, and was selected to be the sole pool cameraman inside the White House for Ike's meeting with outgoing President Harry S. Truman on Inauguration Day. Balderson later recalled the occasion in a newspaper interview: "I think this was probably my greatest thrill. I was feeding pictures to NBC, CBS, ABC. The only thing that concerned me was that something might happen to the camera. "

With the beginning of color television in the early 1950s, Balderson was cameraman for the Bob Hope Special, the first NBC color broadcast after the Federal Communications Commission (FCC) formally approved the compatible color system developed by NBC's then-owner, RCA. He later recalled that the gigantic RCA TK-40 and TK-41 color cameras required more than an hour to set up and were comparatively unstable, making frequent adjustment necessary to maintain correct registration of the red, green, and blue primary colors. These cameras also required complicated control consoles and rack-mounted power supplies for the camera's many vacuum tubes and ventilator fans cooling their large image orthicon tubes.

During his career with NBC, Balderson covered every Democratic and Republican convention between 1952–1984. In the mid-1960s, he flew with President Lyndon B. Johnson across the Pacific Ocean, covering LBJ's Vietnam War visit to that war-torn southeast Asian country.

Beginning in the 1960s, Balderson was chief videotape editor for the Huntley-Brinkley Report and later worked with NBC News Department's anchormen John Chancellor and Tom Brokaw as videotape editor of the Nightly News. He once described the two hours before the live network telecast as "very hectic, there's a lot of running around and hollering. Sometimes we go right up to 6:29 pm before the package is ready to televise at 6:30 pm."

Among his notable video engineering assignments for NBC were such New York-originated programs as the Perry Como Show, The Tonight Show starring Steve Allen and then Jack Paar followed by Johnny Carson, and the celebrated Bell Telephone Hour during network television's "Golden Age". Balderson engineered NBC's first electronically edited show, Kraft Music Hall. He also edited the popular quiz show Twenty One for its two-year run (1956–1958), which was later exposed as fixed during the quiz show scandals of the late 1950s. Balderson subsequently told a newspaper reporter that although he was video tape editor for the program's entire run, he "had no idea it was rigged". He described producer Dan Enright standing next to him in the control room once becoming enraged when contestant Charles Van Doren missed an answer (which Enright had supplied in advance to assure Van Doran's winning). Only after the scandal was later revealed did Balderson realize the true reason for Enright's anger.

Balderson was one of the first editors to use videotape for instant replay in sports events televised by NBC in the early 1960s. He was tapped as on-location videotape editor by NBC for many of the network's premier sports events during the 1960s–1980s, including baseball's World Series, NFL and college football, and the 1972 Winter Olympics from Sapporo, Japan.

== Later life and death ==
After retirement from NBC in 1984, Balderson moved from New York to Florida, where he lived in Clearwater. He died on July 29, 2023, at the age of 96.

== Awards ==
Balderson garnered three Emmy nominations during his 35-year career with NBC and in 1977 won the Emmy for "Outstanding Individual Achievement" for editing NBC's 50th anniversary special in 1976, "The First 50 Years". In 1973, he was nominated for an Emmy for outstanding achievement in videotape editing of NBC Nightly News. He was also Emmy-nominated for his work on The Eternal Light, an acclaimed NBC Sunday morning religious program.
