= Westmoreland High School (Virginia) =

Location
- 16380 Kings Highway; Montross, Virginia 22520; United States; 38°5′37.8″N 76°49′5″W

Information
- School type: Public high school
- Opened: 1932
- School district: Westmoreland County Public Schools
- Superintendent: Cathy Rice
- Principal: Michael Bathgate
- Grades: 9–12
- Enrollment: 488 (2025-26)
- Language: English
- Campus: Rural
- Colors: Carolina blue, Navy and Gold
- Athletics conference: Virginia High School League; Northern Neck District; Region A
- Mascot: Eagles
- Website: https://whs.wmlcps.org/

Westmoreland High School, a fully accredited high school in Montross, Virginia, in the United States, is a member school of the Northern Neck District in Region A of the single A division of the Virginia High School League. Fed by Washington District Elementary, Cople Elementary School, and Montross Middle School, Westmoreland is the larger of two high schools in Westmoreland County, with smaller Colonial Beach High School being the only other public high school in the county. Named Washington and Lee High School prior to 2022, as of 2025 enrollment was 488 students.

== Replacement with new school ==
In early 2016, public meetings were held to discuss a 103-acre (42 ha) site for a new high school. On July 11, 2017, Westmoreland County officials, School Board members and officials, and faculty gathered in a former cornfield to unveil a sign announcing the site of a new school building. Michael Perry, Westmoreland County Public Schools Superintendent, said that the new facility would offer "expanded opportunities in the fields of career and technical education, math, sciences, and the arts".

In early 2021, the Westmoreland County School Board unveiled the name of the replacement facilities for the former Washington and Lee High School. This new high school campus was unveiled as Westmoreland High School.

== Athletics ==
The school's athletes have won the following State Championships:

- 1980 Boys Track
- 1998 Boys Basketball (Group A)
- 2001 Football (Division 2)
- 2014 Boys Track High Jump (Milan Bullock)
- 2014 Girls Track 800m Race (Kathryn Beddoo)

== Notable alumni ==
- Walter Balderson, Emmy Award-winning television editor and video engineer
