= Bridgeport Academy =

Location
- 3217 Commander Shepard Blvd. Hampton, Virginia 23666; United States
- Coordinates: 37°5′26.5″N 76°23′11.9″W

Information
- Established: 2007
- School district: Hampton City Public Schools
- Principal: Kimberly Sharpe
- Staff: 17
- Teaching staff: 15
- Enrollment: 120
- Campus size: 4.6 acres (19,000 m^{2})
- Slogan: Building a bridge to a bright future
- Website: bridgeport.sbo.hampton.k12.va.us

Bridgeport Academy is an alternative school in Hampton, Virginia. Established in 2007, the school serves middle and high school students as an alternative education from regular Hampton City Public Schools.

== History ==
The school opened in August 2007 and was originally housed in a strip mall on North Armistead St. in downtown Hampton, using space that was under lease from Queen Street Baptist Church. In February 2008, Bridgeport moved to its current location at 3217 Commander Shepard Boulevard.
