= Nelsonia, Virginia =

- Census-designated place
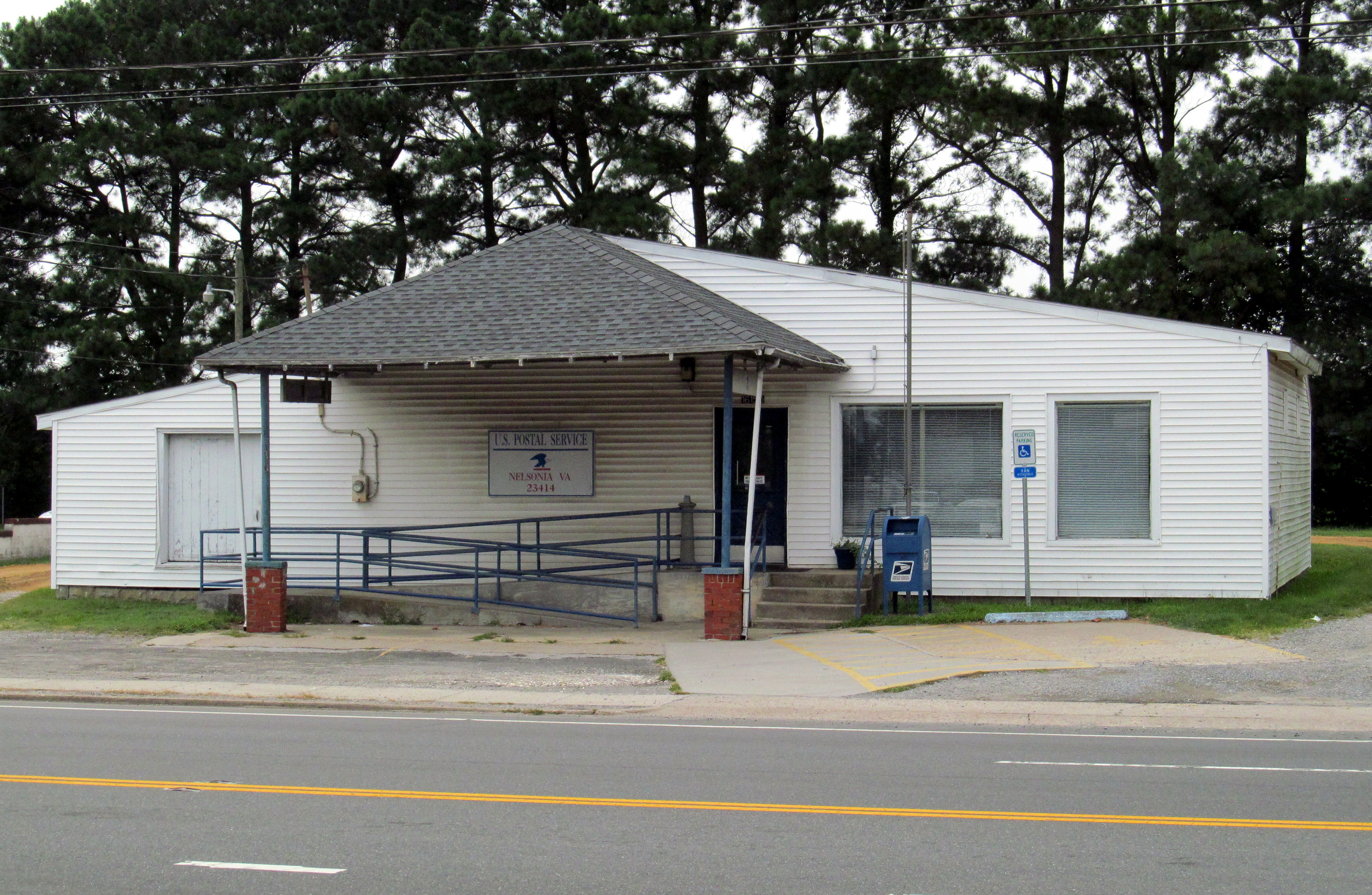
- United States Post Office in Nelsonia

- Location in Accomack County and the state of Virginia.
- Coordinates: 37°49′21″N 75°35′22″W
- Country: United States
- State: Virginia
- County: Accomack
- Elevation: 46 ft (14 m)

Population (2020)
  - Total: 451
- Time zone: UTC−5 (Eastern (EST))
  - Summer (DST): UTC−4 (EDT)
- FIPS code: 51-48776
- GNIS feature ID: 2584889

Nelsonia is a census-designated place (CDP) in Accomack County, Virginia, United States. Per the 2020 census, the population was 451.

== Geography ==
The CDP lies at an elevation of 46 feet.

== Demographics ==
Historical population
| Census | Pop. | Note | %± |
|---|---|---|---|
| 2010 | 523 | | — |
| 2020 | 451 | | −13.8% |
U.S. Decennial Census; 2010 2020

Nelsonia was first listed as a census designated place in the 2010 U.S. census.

=== 2020 census ===
Nelsonia CDP, Virginia – Racial and ethnic composition Note: the US Census treats Hispanic/Latino as an ethnic category. This table excludes Latinos from the racial categories and assigns them to a separate category. Hispanics/Latinos may be of any race.
| Race / Ethnicity (NH = Non-Hispanic) | Pop 2010 | Pop 2020 | % 2010 | % 2020 |
|---|---|---|---|---|
| White alone (NH) | 152 | 103 | 29.06% | 22.84% |
| Black or African American alone (NH) | 282 | 193 | 53.92% | 42.79% |
| Native American or Alaska Native alone (NH) | 0 | 0 | 0.00% | 0.00% |
| Asian alone (NH) | 3 | 0 | 0.57% | 0.00% |
| Pacific Islander alone (NH) | 0 | 0 | 0.00% | 0.00% |
| Some Other Race alone (NH) | 0 | 0 | 0.00% | 0.00% |
| Mixed Race or Multi-Racial (NH) | 9 | 9 | 1.72% | 2.00% |
| Hispanic or Latino (any race) | 77 | 146 | 14.72% | 32.37% |
| Total | 523 | 451 | 100.00% | 100.00% |

== Education ==
Nelsonia is part of Accomack County Public Schools.
