= Oak Hill Christian School =

Christian school in Herndon, Virginia, US

Coordinates: 38°57′10″N 77°20′30″W

- Herndon, Virginia, Virginia; USA

Information
- Type: Private, Classical Christian
- Established: 1997
- Headmaster: Robert Loren Thoburn II
- Grades: PreK-12
- Campus: suburban
- Website: oakhillk12.com

Oak Hill Christian School is a private, classical Christian school located in Herndon, Virginia. Oak Hill was established in 1997 and offers classes in every grade pre-K through 12.

Oak Hill is a member of the Association of Classical and Christian Schools and uses the classical teaching method.
