= Catholic High School (Virginia) =

Catholic high school in Virginia Beach, Virginia

Location
- 4552 Princess Anne Road; Virginia Beach, Virginia 23462; United States; 36°48′29″N 76°8′2″W

Information
- Former names: Norfolk Catholic High School, Bishop Sullivan Catholic High School
- School type: Private, High School
- Motto: Latin: Quis ut Deus (Who is like unto God.)
- Religious affiliation: Roman Catholic
- Established: 1949; 77 years ago
- Principal: Tal Covington
- Teaching staff: 32.6 (FTE) (2019–20)
- Grades: 9–12
- Gender: Co-educational
- Enrollment: 414 (2019–20)
- Student to teacher ratio: 12.7 (2019–20)
- Campus: Large city
- Campus size: 37 acres (15 ha)
- Colors: Green; Gold
- Mascot: Crusader
- Team name: Crusaders
- Accreditation: Southern Association of Colleges and Schools
- Publication: Paladin (literary magazine)
- Yearbook: The Crusader
- Feeder schools: Portsmouth Catholic Regional School, St. Patrick Catholic School, St. Pius X Catholic School, St. Gregory the Great
- Website: Official website

Catholic High School, formerly known as Norfolk Catholic High School (1949–1993), Bishop Sullivan Catholic High School (2004–2019), and commonly referred to as "Catholic" or "CHS", is a private Catholic high school in Virginia Beach, Virginia.

== History ==
The school was founded in 1949 as Norfolk Catholic High School in Norfolk and moved to Virginia Beach in 1993. In 2003, the school was renamed in honor of Walter Francis Sullivan, Bishop Emeritus of the Diocese of Richmond and a significant benefactor during the school's move to Virginia Beach. The Barry Robinson Theater and Fine Arts Center opened that same year.

In 2019, in response to revelations that Bishop Sullivan covered up clergy child sex abuse, the school was renamed Catholic High School amid direction that all diocesan institutions, schools and parish buildings must "no longer be named after an individual bishop, pastor, founder or individual".

== Academics ==
Catholic High School is a college preparatory school and fully accredited by the Southern Association of Colleges and Schools and the Virginia Catholic Education Association. Over 98% of CHS' senior classes enrolls in an institution of higher learning upon graduation.

Catholic High School offers a variety of AP courses for advanced preparatory education, including: English Literature, English Language, World History, U.S. History, U.S. Government and Politics, Calculus AB, Calculus BC, Biology, Chemistry, Physics, Environmental Science, German, Spanish, Latin, and Studio Art.

== Religious education ==
In keeping with its Catholic tradition, CHS also gives the students a chance to get in touch with their relationship to God. Students receive various aspects of religious education and are required to perform community service to better understand their place in the wider community, serve as Eucharistic Ministers & Lectors at religious celebrations, and help with the planning and preparation of services and community events.

CHS's Campus Ministry program is one of the strongest and most active on campus. Students, whether Catholic or not, participate in retreats, communal prayer services, and lead prayer each day.

Catholic High School is a Roman Catholic school in the Diocese of Richmond. The Mass is celebrated each week for the whole campus and confessions are available weekly and celebrated as a community twice yearly. CHS also marks several significant events (Rites of Passage, Baccalaureate) with Mass. In addition each student is required to take 4 years of theology.

== Athletics ==
Catholic High School offers 41 sports teams for students to be involved in high school athletics and is a founding member of the Tidewater Conference of Independent Schools as well as a member of the Virginia Independent Schools Athletic Association (VISAA). Catholic High School is a college preparatory school where students are asked to push themselves every day with a rigorous academic program. At the same time, athletics are very important to the students at CHS. Over 85% of the student body participates on at least one of various sports teams.

In 2013, the football team won its first state championship, defeating Potomac School (McLean, Virginia) 50–44 in the Virginia Independent Schools title game to cap off an undefeated season. However, the tenure of football coach Carl Turner ended after the season; the school released a statement saying that Turner had resigned for personal reasons, but Turner then said that he had been fired because he had "run the score up on opposing teams" after being told not to do so.

== Notable alumni ==
- Cecil Gray – former collegiate and professional football player
- Khalan Laborn – NFL running back for the San Francisco 49ers
- Larry Sabato – political science professor
- Ronnie Valentine – former collegiate and professional basketball player
- Humbert Roque Versace – Medal of Honor recipient
- Ashton Walker – collegiate basketball player
