= West End Christian School =

Private school in the United States

Location
- 1600 Atlantic Street; Hopewell, Virginia 23860; United States
- Coordinates: 37°17′45.6″N 77°17′57″W

Information
- School type: Private Christian
- Established: 1949
- Status: Full Accreditation through ACTS
- Dean: Brandon Butterworth
- Grades: K-12
- Enrollment: 200
- Colors: Royal Blue and White
- Website: http://www.wecs-hopewell.com/

West End Christian School (WECS) is a private Christian school in Hopewell, Virginia. The school mascot is a crusader and school colors are blue, white, and black.
