= GW Community School =

Private school in Virginia, United States

The GW Community School
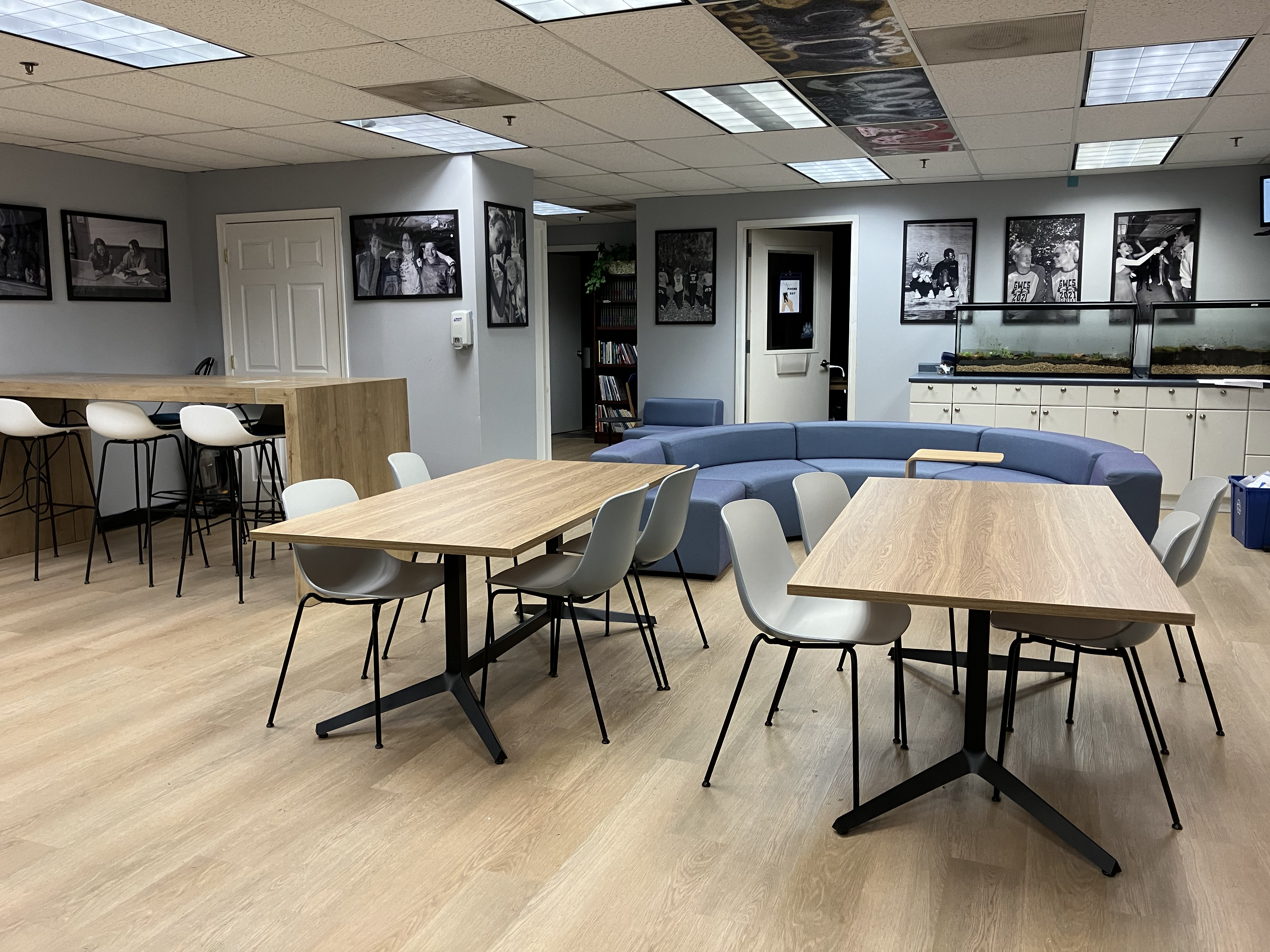
- The main area of the school where students eat lunch

Location
- Springfield, Virginia; United States; 38°48′36.5″N 77°15′16.6″W

Information
- Type: Private
- Established: 1999
- Director: Richard Goldie and Alexa Warden
- Faculty: 13
- Grades: 7-12
- Enrollment: 35-52
- Average class size: 7
- Student to teacher ratio: 5:1
- Campus: Suburban
- Colors: Blue & grey
- Athletics: Basketball
- Mascot: Loki the Coyote
- Tuition: $29,616 USD
- Website: www.gwcommunityschool.com

GW Community School (GWCS) is a teacher-owned and operated coeducational college preparatory school located in Springfield, Virginia, United States. It was founded in 1999 by teachers Richard Goldie and Alexa Warden to serve the needs of bright, non-traditional learners and their families. The founders had previously been active in the founding of Commonwealth Academy before GW Community School was founded. It is accredited by Cognia.

It has an enrollment of 35 to 52 students, grades 7-12. Despite being located just outside Washington, D.C., the "GW" does not stand for "George Washington", but for "Goldie" and "Warden", the names of the school's founders and current directors.

Unlike the majority of private schools, GW has no dress code, allowing students to come in casual wear.

== Offered courses ==
The GW Community School offers an array of courses, many of which are hands-on and student-centered. They change year-to-year, depending on the current staffing and the interest of the students. Courses categories are Math, Science, History, English, Foreign Languages, Personal Development, Economics & Personal Finance, Art/Tech/Career, and PE. There are also electives and after-school clubs for students.

Electives include theater and robotics. The GW theater group performs two plays per year: one in the week before winter break, and the other in the spring. Usually, the winter play is a collection of one-acts that are relatively easy, and the spring play is often a multi-act play that is more challenging to put on.

The two GW robotics teams participate in FIRST Tech Challenge. They have made it to the World Championships multiple times, and continually win various different awards. They are funded by donations.
