= Greenbrier Christian Academy =

Location
- 311 Kempsville Road; Chesapeake, Virginia; United States; 36.7382°N 76.2326°W

Information
- Type: Private Christian
- Established: 1983
- Founder: H. Ron White
- Grades: P3 - 12
- Colors: Blue and orange
- Mascot: Gators
- Rival: Atlantic Shores Christian
- Accreditation: Southern Association of Colleges and Schools
- Website: http://www.gcagators.org

Greenbrier Christian Academy (GCA) is a private Christian school located in the Greenbrier section of Chesapeake, Virginia. It was founded in 1983.

== History ==
H. Ron White created GCA after serving in many education positions. After an informal informational meeting about starting a new school drew 180 participants, White set forth in creating the Chesapeake area's only Christian school without official ties to a local church. The school started by sharing space with the Bible Broadcasting Network and soon moved into its own building. In 1994, the school, along with three other schools, decided to leave the Metro Conference for the Tidewater Conference of Independent Schools. Today, however, the school's teams play in the Metro Athletic Conference once again. In 1995, the school expanded again by opening a pre-Kindergarten through 7th grade lower school.

== 2019 lawsuit ==
In August 2019, a lawsuit was brought against the academy by the family of a 5-year-old girl enrolled in the academy's preschool. According to the complaint, three boys in the girl's kindergarten class repeatedly molested her during naptimes throughout late 2017 and early 2018 while the teacher played music at her desk. While the academy, according to its own statement, investigated one such incident, no one from the school reported it to law enforcement.

== Notable alumni ==
- Eddie Butler, professional baseball player
- Gary Lee, professional baseball player (Varsity Baseball Pitching Coach)
- Patrick Nichols, professional baseball player (Varsity Baseball Head Coach)
- Josh Rupe, professional baseball player
- B.J. Upton, professional baseball player
