= Modest Town, Virginia =

- Census-designated place
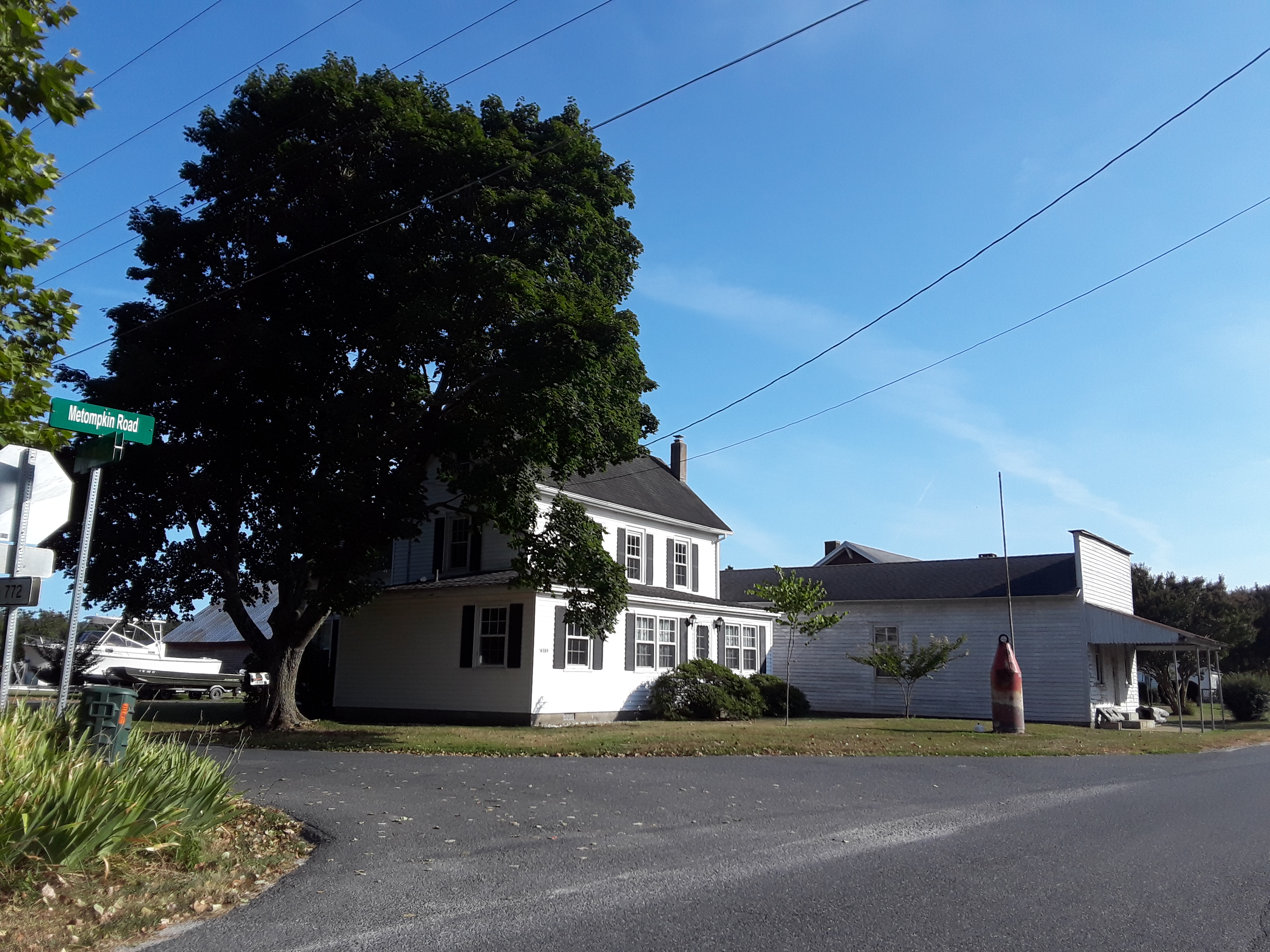
- House and commercial building in Modest Town, July 2018

- Location in Accomack County and the state of Virginia.
- Coordinates: 37°49′1″N 75°33′40″W
- Country: United States
- State: Virginia
- County: Accomack
- Elevation: 36 ft (11 m)

Population (2020)
  - Total: 120
- Time zone: UTC−5 (Eastern (EST))
  - Summer (DST): UTC−4 (EDT)
- FIPS code: 51-48776
- GNIS feature ID: 2584883

Modest Town (sometimes spelled Modestown) is a census-designated place (CDP) in Accomack County, Virginia, United States. Per the 2020 census, the population was 120.

== History ==
The origin of the name "Modest Town" is obscure. In the mid-19th century, it was a point along the stagecoach route between Wilmington, Delaware and Eastville, Virginia.

== Geography ==
The CDP lies at an elevation of 36 feet.

== Demographics ==
Historical population
Census	Pop.	Note	%±
2010	149		—
2020	120		−19.5%
U.S. Decennial Census; 2010 2020

Modest Town was first listed as a census designated place in the 2010 U.S. census.

=== 2020 census ===
Modest Town CDP, Virginia – Racial and ethnic composition Note: the US Census treats Hispanic/Latino as an ethnic category. This table excludes Latinos from the racial categories and assigns them to a separate category. Hispanics/Latinos may be of any race.
Race / Ethnicity (NH = Non-Hispanic)	Pop 2010	Pop 2020	% 2010	% 2020
White alone (NH)	95	86	63.76%	71.67%
Black or African American alone (NH)	33	23	22.15%	19.17%
Native American or Alaska Native alone (NH)	0	0	0.00%	0.00%
Asian alone (NH)	0	0	0.00%	0.00%
Pacific Islander alone (NH)	0	0	0.00%	0.00%
Some Other Race alone (NH)	0	0	0.00%	0.00%
Mixed Race or Multi-Racial (NH)	0	6	0.00%	5.00%
Hispanic or Latino (any race)	21	5	14.09%	4.17%
Total	149	120	100.00%	100.00%
