= Norfolk Academy =

Private school in Norfolk, Virginia, US

Location
- 1585 Wesleyan Drive; Norfolk, Virginia; United States

Information
- Type: Private, day, college-prep
- Motto: ου πολλα αλλα πολυ (Greek) (Not quantity, but quality)
- Religious affiliation: Nonsectarian
- Established: 1728; 298 years ago
- Headmaster: Travis Larrabee
- Grades: 1–12
- Gender: Co-educational
- Enrollment: 1200 students in 1–12
- Campus: 70 acres (28 ha)
- Colors: Orange & Blue
- Athletics conference: Tidewater Conference of Independent Schools (TCIS)
- Mascot: Bulldog
- Nickname: Bulldogs
- Rivals: St. Christopher's School, Cape Henry Collegiate School
- Accreditation: National Association of Independent Schools
- School fees: Transportation: $1,400–$1,800; Late activity bus: $475
- Tuition: $22,800–$28,200 (2024-25)
- Website: www.norfolkacademy.org

Norfolk Academy (NA) is an independent co-educational day school in Norfolk, Virginia. Chartered in 1728, it is the oldest private school in Virginia and the eighth oldest school in the United States. In 1966, Norfolk Academy merged with Country Day School for Girls in Virginia Beach, Virginia to create the current co-educational school. It serves students in Chesapeake, Norfolk, Portsmouth, Virginia Beach, and Suffolk.

In sports, NA competes in the Tidewater Conference of Independent Schools (TCIS) as well as in the Virginia Preparatory League (males) and the League of Independent Schools (females).

== History ==
- Norfolk Academy
- U.S. National Register of Historic Places
- Virginia Landmarks Register
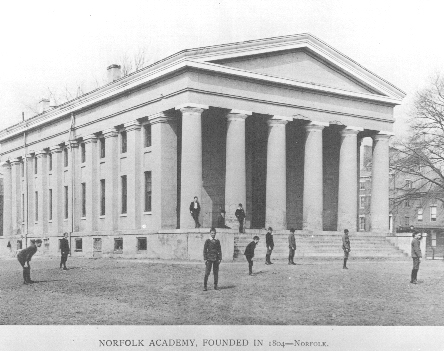
- Norfolk Academy, 420 Bank Street, ca. 1890

- Location within Virginia Location within the United States
- Location: 420 Bank St., Norfolk, Virginia
- Coordinates: 36°51′6″N 76°17′7″W
- Area: 0 acres (0 ha)
- Built: 1840
- Architect: Thomas U. Walter
- NRHP reference No.: 69000343
- VLR No.: 122-0018

Significant dates
- Added to NRHP: November 12, 1969
- Designated VLR: September 9, 1969

The original Norfolk Academy building was designed by architect Thomas Ustick Walter, who subsequently became the fourth Architect of the Capitol. The Greek-revival building, featured on the school's current seal (at right), was modeled after the Temple of Thesus in Athens. Subsequently, the building was a military hospital during the American Civil War and a Red Cross building during World War I. The building was used from 1920 to 1970 as the City of Norfolk's Juvenile and Domestic Relations Court and from 1973 as the headquarters of City of Norfolk's Chamber of Commerce.

Originally accessible via downtown Norfolk's Bank Street, the building now sits at the intersection of East Charlotte Street and St. Paul's Boulevard. The building was listed on the National Register of Historic Places in 1969.

== Academics and student life ==
Students are required to research, compose, and deliver to the student body and faculty an original persuasive speech as a graduation requirement. Public speaking skills are integrated into the curriculum starting in the first grade.

== Athletics ==
Norfolk Academy teams compete in the Tidewater Conference of Independent Schools, the League of Independent Schools, and the Virginia Prep League.

Athletic venues include multiple gymnasiums, an aquatic facility, tennis courts, baseball and lacrosse fields, and track-and-field facilities.

== Notable alumni ==
- Hardy Cross (1899), engineer
- Glenn Youngkin (1985), 74th Governor of Virginia (2022–2025)
- Angela Hucles (1996), sports executive and former professional soccer player
- David McCormack (2018 - transferred), basketball player who plays professionally in Germany
- Mark Williams (2020 - transferred), basketball player for Charlotte Hornets
