= Northampton County Public Schools =

School district in Virginia

Northampton County Public Schools is a school district headquartered in Machipongo, Virginia, serving Northampton County.

== Schools ==
The schools in this district are:

Elementary schools:

- Kiptopeke Elementary School
- Occohannock Elementary School

Middle schools:

- Northampton Middle School

High schools:

- Northampton High School
