= Nandua High School =

Public high school in Virginia, US

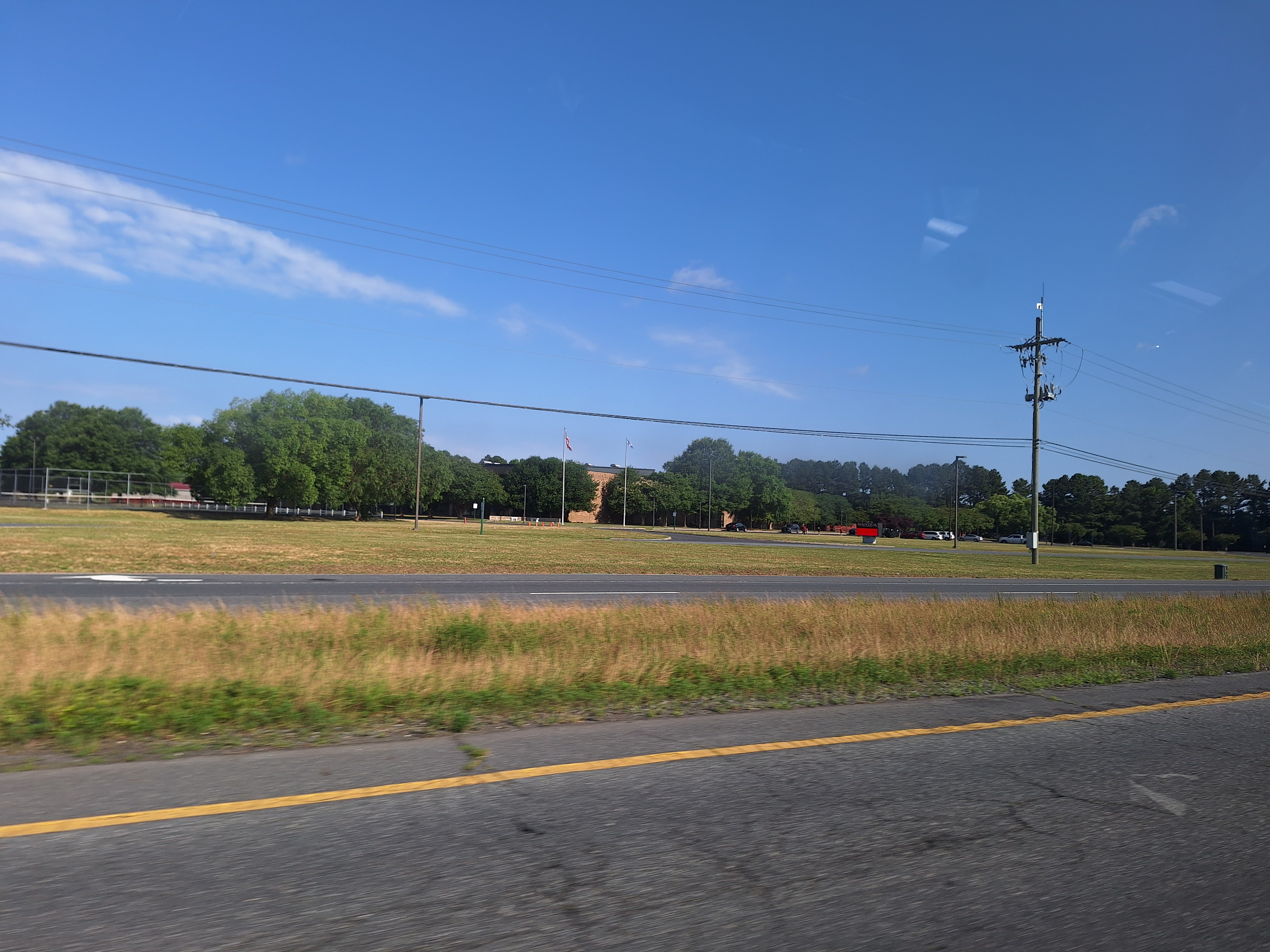

Location
- 26350 Lankford Highway; Onley, Virginia 23418; United States; 37°40′44″N 75°43′32.2″W

Information
- School type: Public, high school
- Established: 1984
- School district: Accomack County Public Schools
- Superintendent: Chris Holland
- Principal: Kimberly Giddens
- Staff: 41.18 (FTE)
- Grades: 9-12
- Enrollment: 676 (2020-21)
- Student to teacher ratio: 16.42
- Language: English
- Schedule type: Block, 4 periods
- Campus: Rural
- Colors: Maroon & Gray
- Athletics conference: Virginia High School League; Eastern Shore District; A Region A
- Mascot: Warrior
- Website: Official Site

Nandua High School is a public high school in Accomack County, Virginia. It is one of three high schools in Accomack County Public Schools. It was created in 1984, with the merger of Onancock and Central high schools. The school is named after a Native American princess of the Powhatan Tribe in the 17th century.

== Academics ==
NHS ranks among the top 8,200 public high schools in America, 181st in Virginia, and 2nd in ACPS. 21% of students participate in AP courses. The graduation rate is 92%.
