= Northstar Academy (Richmond, Virginia) =

School in Richmond, Virginia, United States

Coordinates: 37.68605°N 77.59239°W

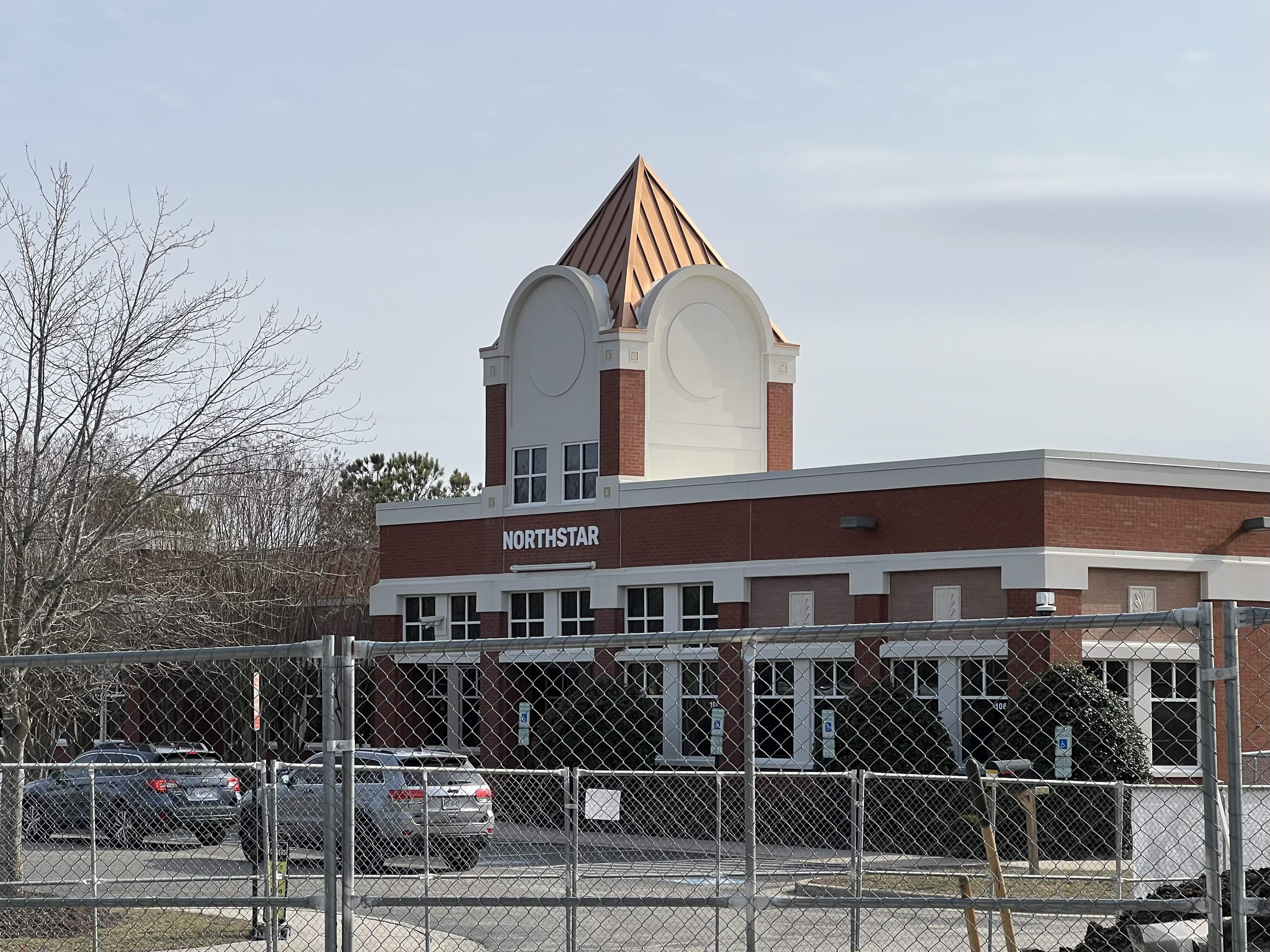
Northstar Academy in Henrico County, Virginia.

Northstar Academy is a private, non-profit, K-12 school located in Richmond, Virginia for students with learning challenges. The school serves students who experience a broad range of disabilities as identified under I.D.E.A. such as Specific Learning Disability, Autism Spectrum Disorders (Asperger's/High Functioning), and Other Health Impairment (ADHD). Northstar Academy is an inclusive school that provides both academic and social instruction.

The students, alumni, parents, and faculty afford students the opportunities to participate in "no-cut" sports (soccer, basketball, and cheerleading), performing arts (such as Talent Shows) and school dances.
