= Norfolk Christian Schools =

- Norfolk, Virginia

Information
- School type: Private, Christian
- Established: 1952
- Founder: Pastor John Dunlap
- Head of school: Mr. Alex Gispert
- Faculty: 88
- Enrollment: 805
- Campus: Upper School(6-12) located on Thole Street, Norfolk Lower School(PK3-5) located on Granby Street; Virginia Beach Lower School (PK3-5) located on Laskin Road
- Team name: Ambassadors
- Colors: Purple and Gold
- Athletic Conference: Tidewater Conference of Independent Schools
- Website: http://www.norfolkchristian.org

Founded in 1952, Norfolk Christian Schools (NCS) is a private, coeducational Christian day school serving Grades K3 through 12. The school is recognized by the Virginia State Board of Education as an accredited school and is accredited by the Virginia Association of Independent Schools, and Southern Association of Colleges and Schools. NCS has three campuses. The original high school, an elementary school in Norfolk, and an elementary school in Virginia Beach. Athletically, NCS is a member of the Tidewater Conference of Independent Schools and the Virginia Independent Schools Athletic Association.

== History ==
Norfolk Christian Schools was founded in 1952 as Norfolk Christian Grammar School by Pastor John Dunlap as a non-denominational Christian day school in Norfolk, Virginia. The school was established to provide a college-preparatory education within a Christian framework for families seeking seeking faith-based instruction, The team name, "Ambassadors," was inspired by 2 Corinthians 5:20, and the school's official colors—purple, gold, and white—were selected to reflect themes drawn from Christian symbolism.

The school's first headmaster, Gene Garrick, oversaw its early development and expansion. In 1959, Norfolk Christian added a high school program, and its first graduating class completed their studies in 1962. During its early decades, the school expanded its academic curriculum and extracurricular programs while emphasizing Christian education and missionary outreach.

Since its founding, Norfolk Christian Schools has grown from a grammar school into a Private K-12 institution, The school continues to operate as an independent, non-denominational Christian school, maintaining its focus on academic achievement and Christian faith while serving students from the Hampton Roads region.

== Notable alumni ==
- James Michael McAdoo (2011), professional basketball player
