= Chincoteague High School =

Public high school in Virginia, United States

Coordinates: 37°56′33.8″N 75°21′49.6″W

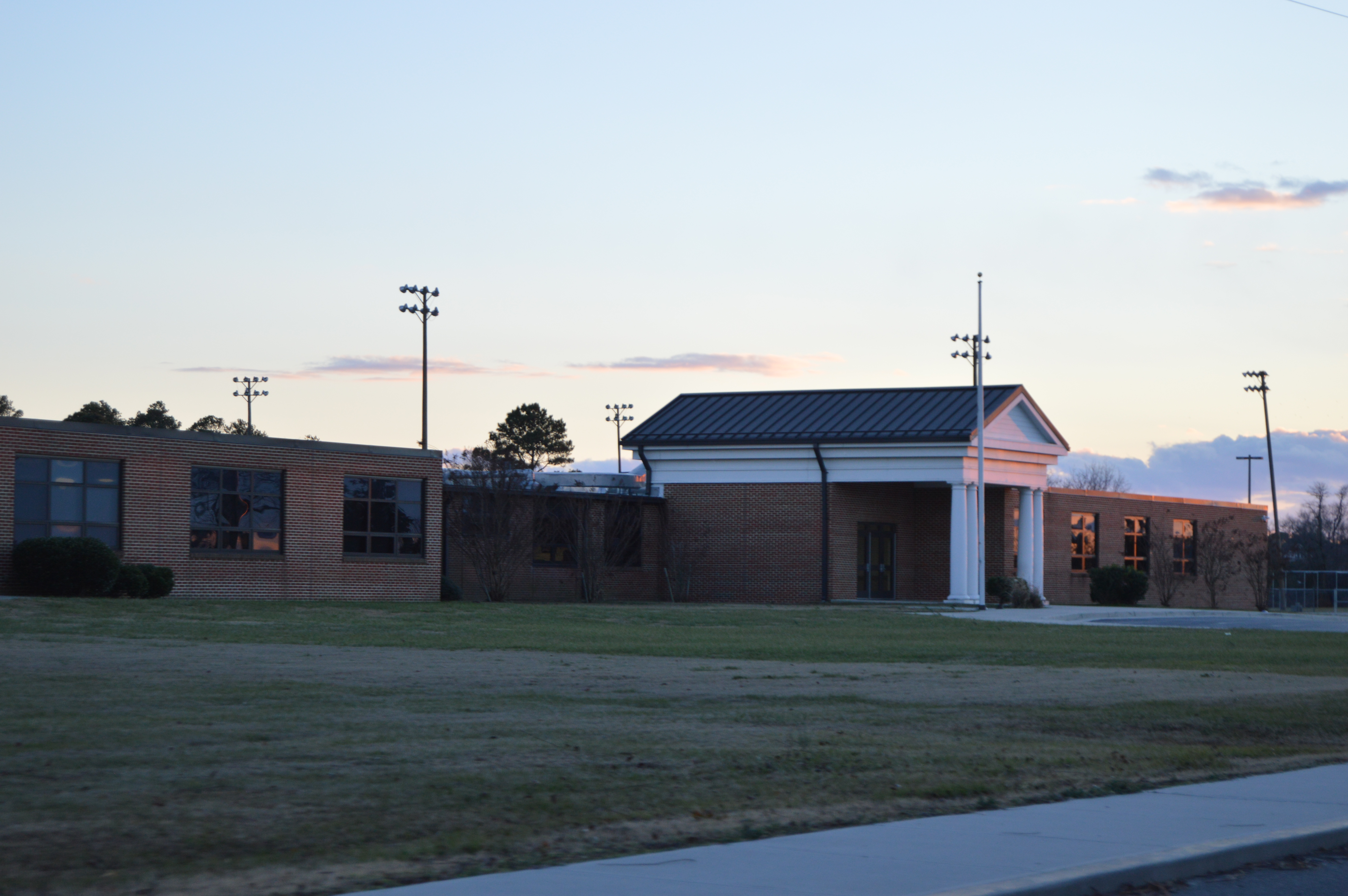

Location
- 4586 Main Street; Chincoteague, Virginia 23336; United States

Information
- School type: Public, secondary school
- Established: Unknown
- School district: Accomack County Public Schools
- NCES District ID: 5100060
- Superintendent: Warren C. Holland
- NCES School ID: 510006002003
- Principal: John Killmon
- Staff: 27.99 (FTE)
- Grades: 6-12
- Enrollment: 296 (2023-24)
- Student to teacher ratio: 10.58
- Language: English
- Campus: Suburban
- Colors: Blue & Gold
- Athletics conference: Virginia High School League; Eastern Shore District; A Region A
- Mascot: Fighting Pony
- Website: Official Site

Chincoteague High School is a public high school in Accomack County, Virginia. It is one of the four high schools in Accomack County Public Schools. It serves grades six through twelve and, due to its low number of students, has only approximately 40 students per grade. As of the 2023-2024 school year, 296 students attend the school. Its mascot, the pony, is named after the feral Chincoteague Ponies on the nearby Assateague Island.

== Academics ==
=== Curriculum ===
CHS is ranked among the top 3,900 public high schools in America, 83rd in Virginia, and 1st in ACPS. CHS offers Advanced Placement (AP) classes to its students, with AP participation being at 38%. The graduation rate is 96%.

=== Enrollment ===
As of the 2023-2024 school year, 256 students are enrolled at Chincoteague High School. Of the students enrolled, 79.39% of students are White, 12.48% are African American, 2.7% are Hispanic, 0.68% are American Indian/ Alaska Native, and 4.39% are Multiracial.
