= Hampton Roads Academy =

School in Newport News, Virginia, US

Location
- 739 Academy Lane; Newport News, Virginia 23602; United States
- 37°6′21.3″N 76°28′54.4″W

Information
- Type: Private, Coeducational
- Established: 1959
- Oversight: Board of Trustees
- Principal: (Upper) Benjamin Rous (Middle) Lisa Thatcher (Lower) Susanne Swain
- Head of school: Jay Lasley
- Grades: Pre K - 12
- Age range: 4-18
- Average class size: 16
- Colors: Blue, Gold
- Athletics conference: TCIS(or Peninsula Independent Athletic League (PIAL) for Middle School Sports)
- Mascot: Navigators
- Team name: Navigators
- Rival: Walsingham Academy
- School fees: Yearly Activity Fee (Pre-K-12) $350 Matriculation fee (one time for new students) $850
- Tuition: Pre-Kindergarten - Kindergarten $9,600, Lower School (1-4) $10,490, Middle School (5) $12,590, Middle School (6-8) $16,375, Upper School (9-12) $17,790
- Website: http://www.hra.org

Hampton Roads Academy is a private, independent, co-educational, day school in Newport News, Virginia serving 644 students in grades Pre-K through twelve, and part of the Tidewater Conference of Independent Schools. HRA is accredited through the Virginia Association of Independent Schools, and is a member of the National Association of Independent Schools. The average class size is 16, and there were 65 students in the Class of 2017. The school was founded in 1959, in the context of massive resistance, as a segregation academy.

== History ==
=== Mission and History ===
Hampton Roads Academy was founded in 1959 as a segregation academy with a student body of sixty all white students in grades seven through eleven. The school's founder, Hampton physician Russell von Lehn Buxton, who became the first chairman of the Board of Trustees, explained that the school was established to avoid the "limitations and constraints imposed on the public school system." Buxton, a graduate of Princeton and the University of Pennsylvania Medical School remained on the board until 1988.

=== Funding and Construction ===
In 1959, the State Corporation Commission granted Hampton Roads Academy a charter to begin construction. The school's board of trustees turned to the community and to the First National Bank to raise funding. In May 1959, Hampton Roads Academy secretary Pauline Trimpi signed a contract to begin construction of the $113,000 project on May 15.

=== History ===
Hampton Roads Academy awarded their first graduating class in 1961, just two years after the school's founding. Throughout the 1960s, the school continued to raise funds, increase student enrollment, build new facilities, and add student programs. Notable additions to the school during this time included an expanded library, faculty houses, a multipurpose room, a cafeteria, and the student newspaper. In 1961, the school earned accreditation from the Virginia Board of Education. The school admitted its first black student around 1970, the start of an intentional process to diversify and become inclusive. Hampton Roads Academy continued to expand its facilities, completing construction of the Joseph Carpenter Gym in 1973, building new athletic fields and tennis courts, and paving the parking lot. In 1976, the Hampton Roads Academy Advancement Office was established, and in 1979, the school's first Middle School was created with the addition of grade six. In 1980, Hampton Roads Academy hired fundraising consulting firm Marts & Lundy to assist in the Silver Anniversary Campaign. Three years later, the school reached its campaign goal of $750,000. Excess donations were used to purchase school computers. The 1980s also saw the creation of the school's parent volunteer program, international exchange student program, Grandparent's Day, and the construction of a new auditorium.

In the 1990s, Hampton Roads Academy continued to expand school facilities using gifts and donations. Notable developments include the expansion of Upper School, the addition of an arts & crafts wing, and the creation of a new library. The beginning of the 2000s saw vast improvements to Hampton Roads Academy's athletic facilities. These improvements included the construction of a new baseball field, football bleachers, a press box, and the resurfacing of the track. In 2005, the Hampton Roads Country Day School began renting out space at Hampton Roads Academy. Three years later, the Hampton Roads Country Day School merged with Hampton Roads Academy, becoming a Pre-K-12 institution. In 2009, Hampton Roads Academy celebrated its 50th anniversary. On February 11, 2019, HRA held a groundbreaking ceremony on construction for a 400-seat full-service dining hall, a new Lower School wing with 12 classrooms, an Innovation Lab/Makerspace, and a 1,000 square foot hydroponics lab. In January 2020 the school had 615 students, from pre-kindergarten to 12th grade.

== Demographics ==
During a recent academic year, the student body was 78.2% White, 9.6% African-American, 6.7% Asian, 5.1% Hispanic, and 0.3% Pacific Islander.
