= Colonial Beach High School =

Coordinates: 38.2575°N 76.969°W

- 100 1st St, Colonial Beach, VA 22443; Colonial Beach, Virginia, Virginia

Information
- School type: Public
- Established: 1907
- Enrollment: 620 (2020-2021)
- Colors: Black and gold
- Athletics conference: Northern Neck District
- Mascot: Pete the Pirate
- Nickname: Drifters
- Website: https://cbschoolshs.sharpschool.net/

Colonial Beach High School is a public high school located in Westmoreland County, Virginia, United States. The school has an enrollment of approximately 240 students. Colonial Beach High School became accredited by the Southern Association of colleges and the Virginia State Board of Education in 2005.

== Administration ==
Scott Lush is the principal of the high school.
