= Tidewater Academy =

Location
- 217 W. Church Street; Wakefield, Virginia 23888; United States; 36.971284°N 76.987478°W

Information
- Motto: Vincit veritas ('Truth conquers')
- Established: 1964
- CEEB code: 472297
- Head of school: Lisa Francis
- Grades: Preschool-12
- Colours: Columbia blue and White
- Mascot: Warrior
- Website: Tidewater Academy

Tidewater Academy is a private school in Wakefield, Virginia which was founded in 1964 as a segregation academy. It serves students in preschool through grade 12 and is accredited by the Virginia Association of Independent Schools.

== History ==
In the summer of 1964, ground work was laid to organize a segregation academy in Wakefield as part of Virginia's campaign of massive resistance against the integration of public schools required by the United States Supreme Court decision Brown v. Board of Education. Successful efforts and plans to keep a high school in town were realized when the first Board of Directors, and administration, faculty and staff for Tidewater Academy were chosen that year. On March 24, 1964, under the provisions of Chapter 2 of Title 13.1 of the Code of Virginia, 1950, Tidewater Academy became incorporated.

The school was one of a network of segregated private schools established by the Virginia Education Fund in response the racial integration of public schools.

As defined in 1964, the goals of Tidewater Academy were to "provide a thorough academic education with emphasis on preparation for college; to build an understanding of local cultural heritage and respect for learning; and to create in each student a sense of responsibility for effective leadership, good moral character, and an appreciation of spiritual values." In the second academic year, a lower school program was added to provide a system of twelve grades.

In the early years, classes were housed wherever space was available. Subsequently, buildings were completed by volunteers at what is now the Upper School Campus on Church Street in Wakefield. In 1977 facilities for students in kindergarten through grade six were provided. Since the completion of the new lower school building, all grades are now located at the Wakefield campus.

Tidewater Academy is a member school of the Virginia Association of Independent Schools. Tidewater Academy currently employs a total of 38 full and part-time faculty (14 alumni) and staff members.

Twenty one years after Tidewater Academy opened its doors, it admitted its first African-American student.
