= Accomack County Public Schools =

School district in Virginia

- 23296 Courthouse Ave Accomac, Virginia, 23301

District information
- Type: Public
- Grades: PreK–12
- Superintendent: Rhonda Hall
- NCES District ID: 5100060

Students and staff
- Students: 5,500
- Teachers: 303.98
- Staff: 420.5
- Student–teacher ratio: 16.00

Other information
- Website: www.accomack.k12.va.us

Accomack County Public Schools is a school district headquartered in Accomac, Virginia, serving Accomack County, Virginia.

Dr. Rhonda Hall serves as the district superintendent.

== Schools ==
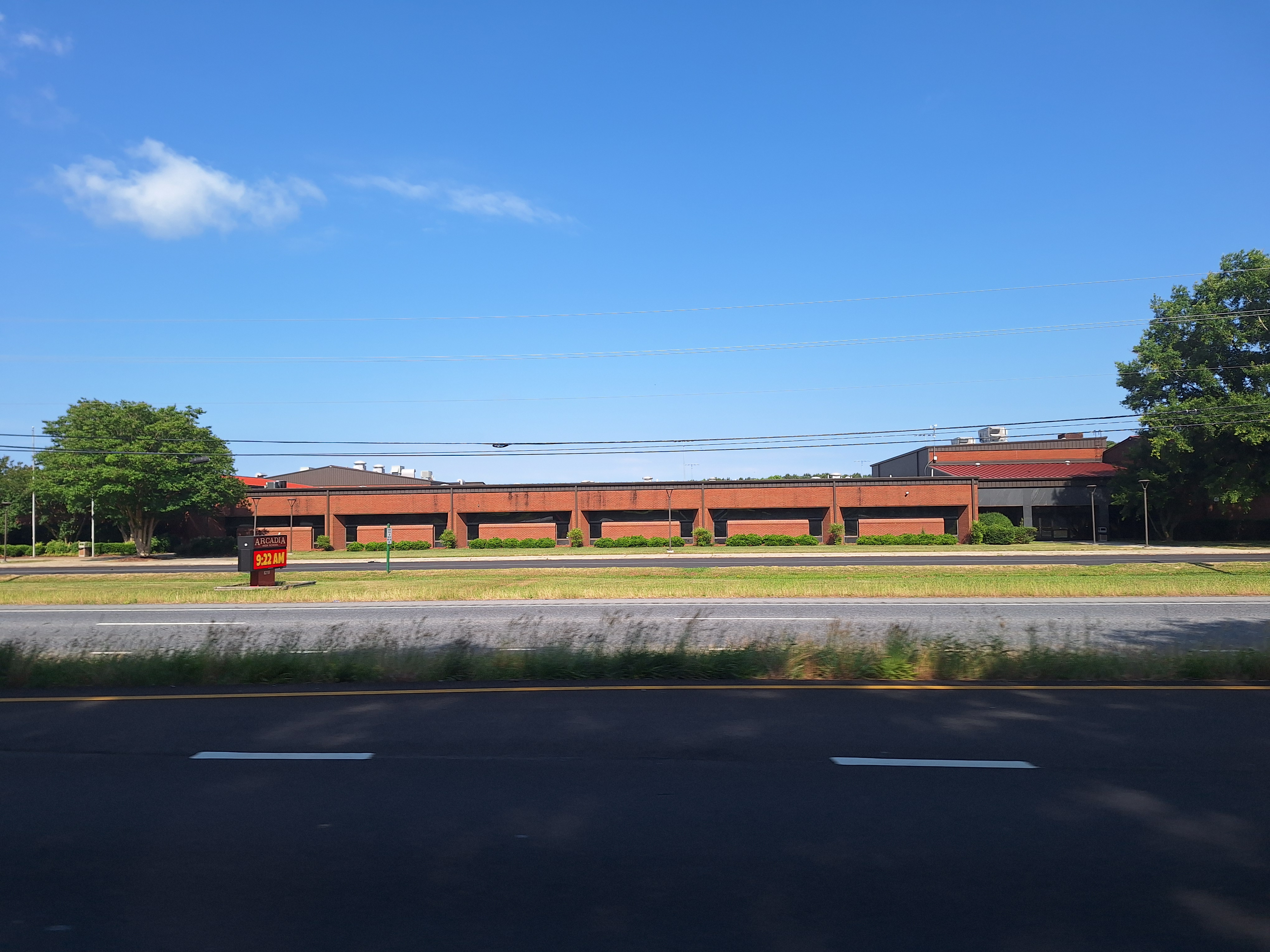
Arcadia High School

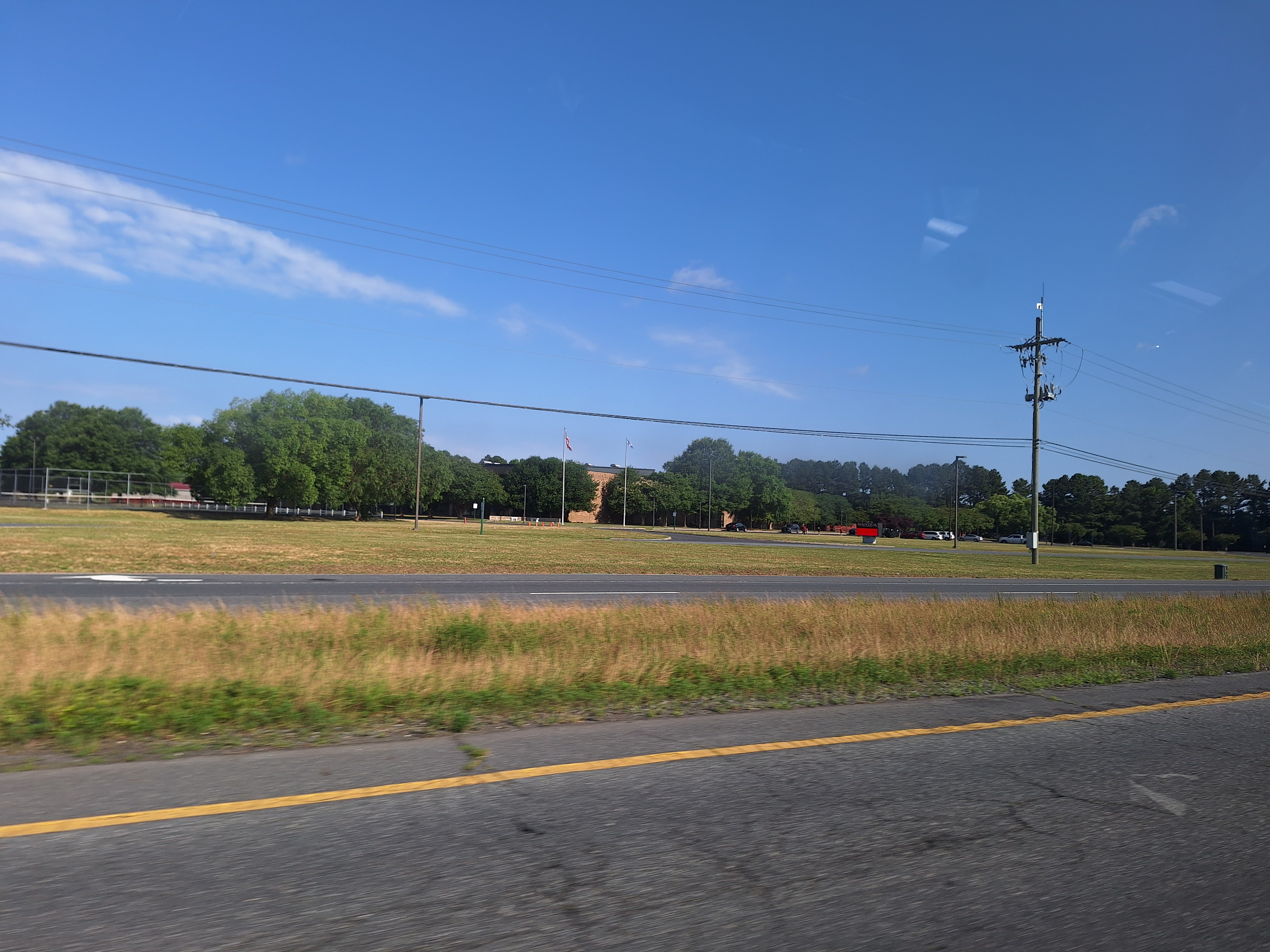
Nandua High School

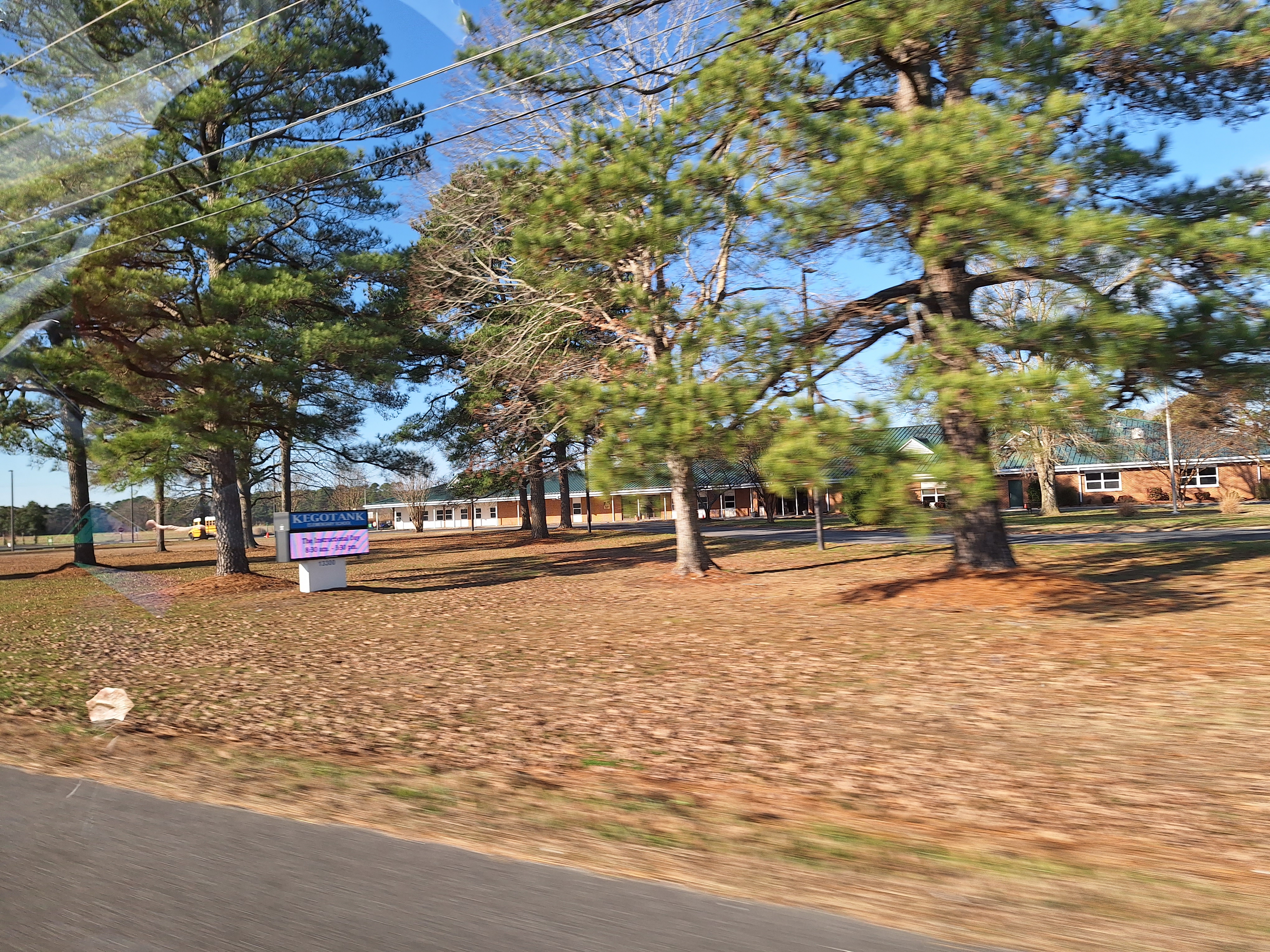
Kegotank Elementary School

The district operates 11 public schools, including Virginia's only K-12 combined school.

Elementary schools

- Accawmacke Elementary School
- Chincoteague Elementary School
- Kegotank Elementary School
- Metompkin Elementary School
- Pungoteague Elementary School

Middle schools

- Arcadia Middle School
- Nandua Middle School

High schools

- Arcadia High School
- Nandua High School

6-12 schools

- Chincoteague High School

K-12 schools

- Tangier Combined School

Other

- Badger Technical Center
