= Southampton Academy =

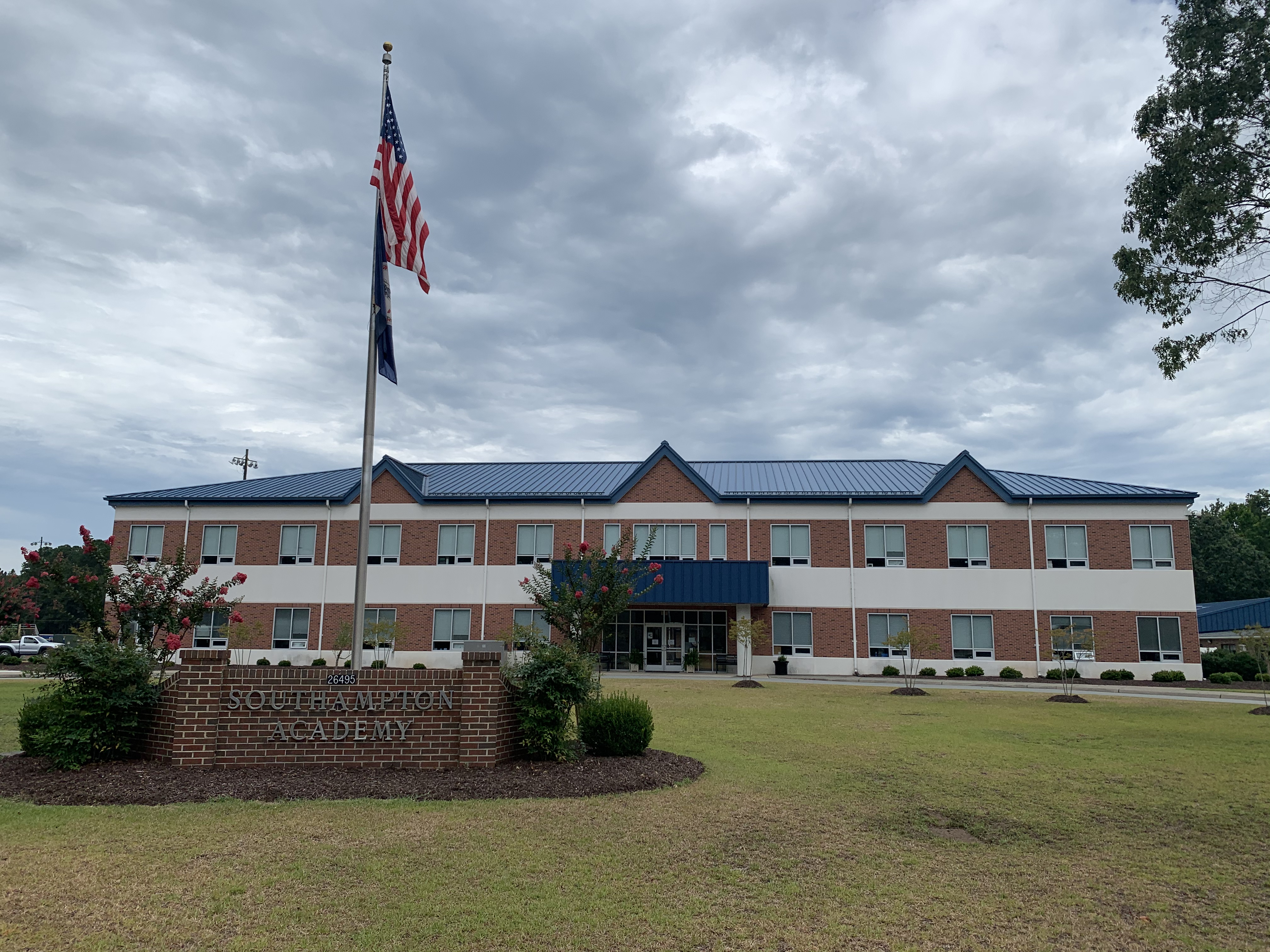
- Southampton Academy, view from street

Location
- 26495 Old Plank Rd. Courtland, Virginia 23837; United States; 36.702700°N 77.057709°W

Information
- Type: Private
- Established: 1969
- Headmaster: Tamee Carr Railey
- Staff: 16
- Faculty: 43
- Grades: Pre-K - 12th
- Colors: Blue and White
- Mascot: Raider
- Website: https://www.southamptonacademy.org/

Southampton Academy is a small, private school located in Courtland, Virginia. Southampton Academy, also known locally as "SA" provides education for students from pre-kindergarten through the 12th grade. Southampton Academy was founded in 1969, as a segregation academy.

== Athletics ==
The school contains students ranging from pre-kindergarten through twelfth grade, thus the team offers athletic teams from the middle school level (junior junior varsity) to the varsity level. Most of Southampton Academy's athletic teams participate in the Virginia Commonwealth Conference (VCC). At the state level, Southampton Academy participates in Virginia Independent Schools (VIS) in Division III (smallest schools classification).

From the schools founding in 1969 to 1991 the school played 11 man football in both the VAAC (precursor to the VCC) and the Virginia Commonwealth Conference.

From 1991 to 2004, the school fielded eight-man football teams that participated in the Colonial Carolina Conference, a conference that plays in the North Carolina Independent Schools Athletic Association (NCISAA). The school was forced to play in North Carolina because there were none or few schools in Virginia that participated in 8-man football during this time period. While participating in the Colonial Carolina Conference, the Raiders won conference championships in 1995, 1996, and 1999. In 1997 and 2004, the Raiders won the NCISAA state championship. Southampton Academy finished its time playing 8-man football with another NCISAA championship in 2004.

In 2005, the Raiders resumed playing 11-man football and reentered the Virginia Commonwealth Conference.

In 1995–1996, the girls teams at Southampton Academy finished a banner year in which they won VCC championships in girls basketball, volleyball, cheerleading, and softball.

In 2007, the Raiders won the VIS Division III state baseball championship.

In 2007, The Girls Varsity Basketball team won the VCC Conference and Tournament Championship.

From 2000 through 2009 the Girl's Varsity Volleyball team won 10 consecutive regular season VCC Conference Championships as well as 9 VCC Tournament Championships.
