= Oak Hall, Virginia =

- Census-designated place
- Location in Accomack County and the state of Virginia.
- Coordinates: 37°55′51″N 75°32′49″W
- Country: United States
- State: Virginia
- County: Accomack
- Elevation: 26 ft (7.9 m)

Population (2020)
  - Total: 226
- Time zone: UTC−5 (Eastern (EST))
  - Summer (DST): UTC−4 (EDT)
- ZIP codes: 23396, 23416
- FIPS code: 51-58184
- GNIS feature ID: 2584896

Oak Hall is a census-designated place in Accomack County, Virginia, United States. It was first listed as a CDP on March 31, 2010. Per the 2020 census, the population was 226.

== Geography ==
The CDP lies at an elevation of 26 feet.

== Demographics ==
Historical population
Census	Pop.	Note	%±
2010	255		—
2020	226		−11.4%
U.S. Decennial Census; 2010 2020

Oak Hall was first listed as a census designated place in the 2010 U.S. census.

=== 2020 census ===
Oak Hall CDP, Virginia – Racial and ethnic composition Note: the US Census treats Hispanic/Latino as an ethnic category. This table excludes Latinos from the racial categories and assigns them to a separate category. Hispanics/Latinos may be of any race.
Race / Ethnicity (NH = Non-Hispanic)	Pop 2010	Pop 2020	% 2010	% 2020
White alone (NH)	165	132	64.71%	58.41%
Black or African American alone (NH)	71	66	27.84%	29.20%
Native American or Alaska Native alone (NH)	2	2	0.78%	0.88%
Asian alone (NH)	0	6	0.00%	2.65%
Pacific Islander alone (NH)	5	0	1.96%	0.00%
Some Other Race alone (NH)	0	4	0.00%	1.77%
Mixed Race or Multi-Racial (NH)	5	10	1.96%	4.42%
Hispanic or Latino (any race)	7	6	2.75%	2.65%
Total	255	226	100.00%	100.00%

== Education ==
It is in Accomack County Public Schools. Arcadia High School is in the CDP.
