= Cavalier Athletic Conference =

High school sports group in Virginia, US

The Cavalier Athletic Conference is a high school athletic conference composed primarily of schools in Virginia.

== Members ==
- Blue Ridge School
- Fredericksburg Academy
- Highland School
- Massanutten Military Academy
- Quantico High School
- Randolph-Macon Academy
- Shenandoah Valley Academy
- Tandem Friends School
- Wakefield Country Day School
- Wakefield School
