= Delaney Athletic Conference =

The Delaney Athletic Conference consisted of 15 high schools from Northern and Central Virginia. The Delaney Athletic Conference (DAC) was named after Joe Delaney, an athlete from Northwestern State University. The conference disbanded following the 2020-2021 school year.

== Mission statement ==
"The Delaney Athletic Conference was created by its member schools in a spirit of trust and shared commitment to the highest ideal of sportsmanship, healthy competition, and mutual respect."

== Members at time of dissolution ==
- Chelsea Academy
- Foxcroft School
- Fredericksburg Academy
- Fredericksburg Christian School
- Highland School
- Quantico High School
- Randolph-Macon Academy
- Seton High School
- Tandem Friends School
- Trinity Christian School
- Wakefield Country Day School
- Wakefield School
- Saint Michael the Archangel High School
