= H. Clay Earles =

NASCAR team owner

Henry Clay Earles (August 11, 1913 – November 16, 1999) was the founder and chairman of the board of Martinsville Speedway, a NASCAR stock car racing track that Earles built in 1947 in Ridgeway, Virginia, that was one of the circuit's first paved oval tracks and stands as one of its shortest.

Born in Axton, Virginia, on August 11, 1913, Earles started making money as a five-year-old, selling unwanted leaves from his father's tobacco farm. Initially educated in a one-room schoolhouse, he dropped out of school so that he could help support his family with the 25 cents he earned each hour at a furniture factory.

His first business venture was a failed pool hall, but a gas station was successful and its profits helped pay for a drive-in restaurant in Martinsville, Virginia. The restaurant was sold to buy another gas station. Having seen the crowds attracted by car racing at temporary tracks at fairgrounds, he built a track on 30 acres (120,000 m^{2}) of land he had purchased in 1946. The first scheduled race, predating the establishment of NASCAR, took place on September 7, 1947, drawing more than 6,000 spectators at a facility that only had 750 seats; Seating capacity had grown to 86,000 by the time of Earles's death. In its inaugural year, Bill France Sr. provided the track with advertising and drivers in exchange for one-fourth of profits, and became the founding president of NASCAR when it was incorporated the next year. Martinsville Speedway is the only one of NASCAR's original tracks still in use.

Red Byron was awarded a $500 prize for winning the inaugural race at the track, which had grown to $170,000 by 1999. Earles began a tradition in 1964 of distributing grandfather clocks to race winners, with Richard Petty receiving a track-record of 12, and would have received three more for wins that predated the inception of the practice.

The track measures 0.526 miles (0.847 km) around, with a pair of 800-foot (240 m) straightaways and tight turns banked at 12 degrees, described as two dragstrips with tight turns. The track was first paved in 1955. Unlike the superspeedways, Martinsville became a track where the skill and strategy of each individual driver could overcome the big money and horsepower of the larger teams.

Earles died at age 86 on November 16, 1999, at his Martinsville home.
