= John Tyler Linton =

American landowner and philanthropist (1796–1821)

John Tyler Linton (1796–1821) was a Virginia landowner and philanthropist whose landholdings were donated by his daughter, Sarah Elliott Graham Linton (1822–1901), for the establishment of schools for poor boys and girls in Bristow, Virginia. It is on this land that Linton Hall School (formerly Linton Hall Military School) was established.

== Linton's Ford ==
Linton's Ford was part of the land owned by a family of English "Cavaliers" (followers of King Charles I of England) who came to Virginia from Scotland just after the English Civil War and settled in Prince William County, Virginia. The family had land holdings in Dumfries as well as Bristow.

The property was originally around 740 acres and was owned by Moses Linton, great-great-grandson of Sir Walter de Lynton, who never lived on the property, instead building his home on his property at Marumsco Creek. Upon his death, the land was transferred to his son, John Augustine Elliott Linton (1762–1822), who built the Linton mansion and purchased approximately one thousand additional acres. J.A.E. Linton was sheriff of Prince William County and Justice of the Peace. He married Sarah Tyler, with whom he had a son, John Tyler Linton (1796–1821). John Tyler Linton held a law degree from Dickinson College. John T. Linton married Cecilia Ann Graham, the daughter of a prominent family in Dumfries. The two took up residence at Linton's Ford, where John Tyler died of typhoid fever when he was 26 years old, just two months before the birth of his daughter, Sarah Elliott Graham Linton (1822–1901). Cecilia then married the overseer of her estate, R.H. Phillips, and the couple had a daughter, Anne Cecilia Phillips (1823–1917). Less than a year later, Cecilia was widowed again and Anne's uncle, Campbell Graham was appointed their guardian.

Sarah Linton was sent to the Georgetown Academy for Young Ladies in Washington D.C. (which has since been renamed Georgetown Visitation Preparatory School) to be given an education "befitting her rank." Sarah converted to Catholicism and later became a nun, taking the name Sister Baptista, Order of Visitation. As the last heir of Linton's Ford, Sister Baptista needed to find a way to dispose of her property while making provisions for her younger sister. Over the years, a portion of the land had been sold in order to support her sister, Anne, while another part of the plantation had been acquired by the Southern Railroad as a right of way. After reading "The Monks of the West" by Count de Montalembert, Sister Baptista decided to give the Benedictine Monks of Belmont Abbey in North Carolina the remaining land. Her sister's future was secured by a relative who promised her an annual annuity of $1,500.

The Benedictine Fathers established St. Maurus Boys’ School in the donated land in 1893; the Benedictine Sisters established St. Edith's Academy for girls in 1894. St. Edith's opened with sixteen boarders and several day students.

In the early 1920s, the enrollment of both schools began to decline. The Benedictine Fathers closed St. Maurus Boys' School and returned to their abbey in Belmont, North Carolina. In 1922, the Benedictine Sisters founded St. Gertrude High School for girls in Richmond, Virginia. The same year, St. Edith's, in Bristow, was converted to Linton Hall Military School, a military boarding school for boys ages 6–16. In 1946, the first floor of the main portion of the present building was completed. By 1951, the second and third floors and the classroom wing were completed, and the gymnasium was built in 1956. By 1978, the school had been renamed Linton Hall School but it was not until the late 1980s that the school dropped the military program and became coeducational.
