= Firebase Sarge =

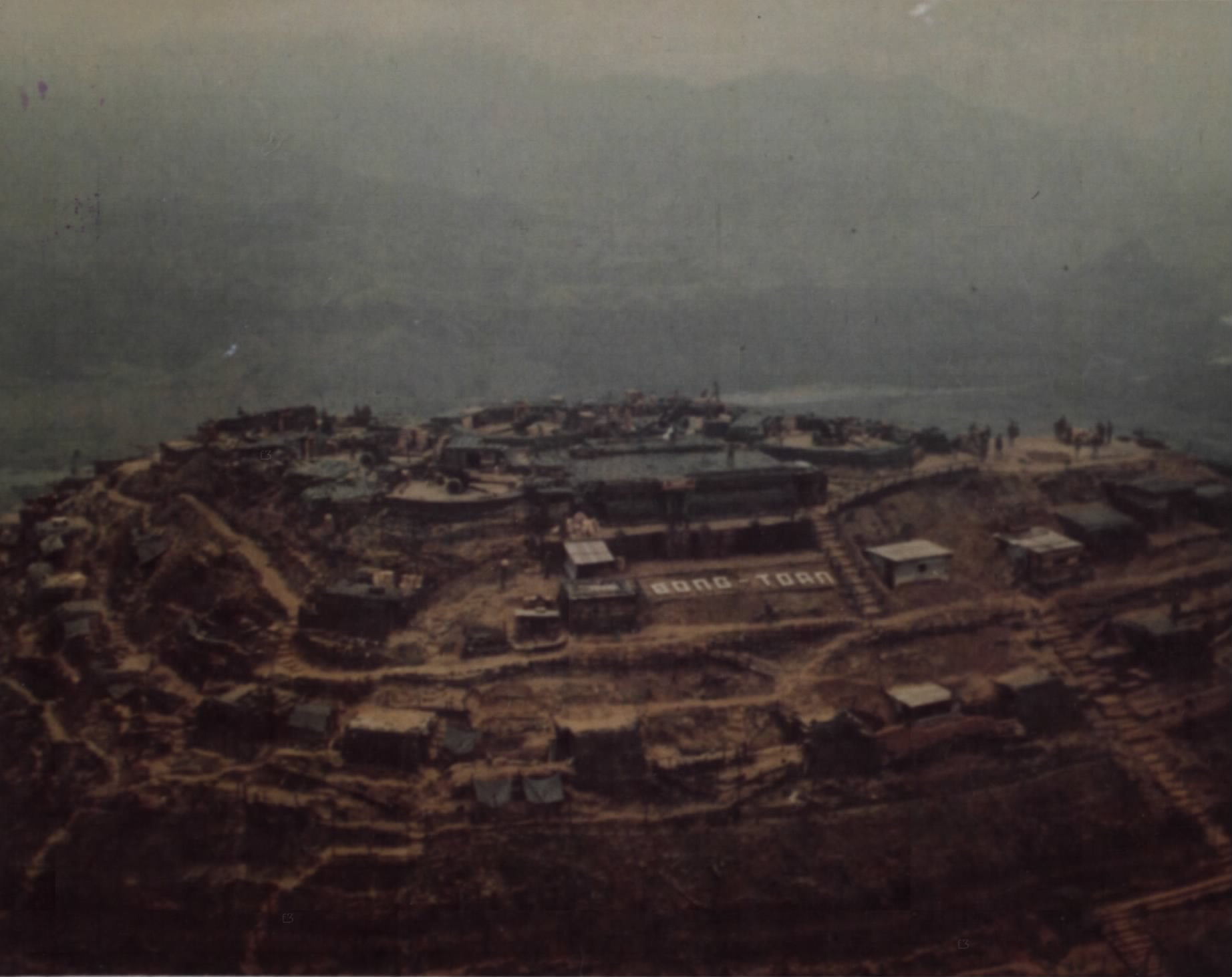
- Firebase Sarge, 6 March 1970

Site information
- Type: Army

Location
- Coordinates: 16.707°N 106.898°E

Site history
- Built: 1971
- In use: 1971–1972
- Battles/wars: Vietnam War; Easter Offensive

Garrison information
- Occupants: 2nd Battalion, 506th Infantry Regiment; 4th Vietnamese Marine Corps Battalion

Firebase Sarge (also known as Firebase Dong Toan or Hill 552) is a former U.S. Army and Army of the Republic of Vietnam (ARVN) firebase in Quang Tri Province, central Vietnam.

== History ==
The base was established on Dong Toan Mountain east of Highway 9 overlooking the site of the former Vandegrift Combat Base.

=== 1971 ===
The 2nd Battalion, 506th Infantry Regiment, part of the 101st Airborne Division, occupied Sarge during 1971.

On 30 March 1971 Hughes OH-6A Cayuse #67-16433 crashed near the landing pad at Sarge killing an artillery observer.

Following the loss of Hill 950 in June 1971, the Army Security Agency (ASA) searched for a replacement site for its Explorer III signals interception system and Sarge and Con Thien were selected, with the units installed by December 1971. The top-secret Explorer equipment was contained in purpose-built bunkers constructed by the 27th Combat Engineer Battalion and operated by U.S. Army technicians from the 407th Radio Research Detachment, Detachment A, 8th Radio Research Field Station (8th RRFS).

At 02:00 on 6 June People's Army of Vietnam (PAVN) forces attacked South Vietnamese Marines 1.5 miles (2.4 km) northwest of Sarge losing 83 killed for the loss of two Marines. On 18 June approximately 400 PAVN attacked Sarge, they were forced back by the 200 Marine defenders with U.S. air support with 95 PAVN and 13 Marines killed.

On 15 August the PAVN attacked Sarge again, losing 29 killed for the loss of four Marines. On 19 August Marines killed 11 PAVN in an ambush near Sarge. On 21 August the South Vietnamese withdrew all artillery and most of the Marines from Firebase Sarge, leaving only approximately 200 Marines at the base.

=== 1972 ===
By January 1972 the ARVN 3rd Division had assumed responsibility for the area north of Highway 9. Sarge was occupied by the 4th Vietnamese Marine Corps Battalion (4th VNMC).

During March 1972, then Major Walter E. Boomer, adviser to the 4th VNMC reported to the 3rd Division headquarters that the PAVN appeared to be building up their forces west of Sarge and the 8th RRFS reported that the PAVN had established an artillery headquarters 6 km southwest of Sarge.

The PAVN launched their Easter Offensive on 30 March 1972 and PAVN artillery fire killed 15 Marines at Sarge that day. A direct hit of the 8th RRFS bunker ignited Thermite demolition charges, incinerating the two U.S. Army operators inside. The artillery fire was followed by a ground attack by the PAVN 66th Regiment which by 02:00 on 1 April had succeeded in penetrating the base's defense perimeter. At 03:45 Major Boomer and the 4th VNMC command group abandoned the base and escaped through PAVN lines into the surrounding jungle. By 2 April Major Boomer and 8 Vietnamese Marines had made it to the relative safety of Mai Loc Camp. 4th VNMC losses were 347 out of an initial strength of 632 Marines.

== Current use ==
The base has reverted to jungle.
