= North Cross School =

Private school in Roanoke, Virginia, US

Coordinates: 37.225836°N 80.0004°W

- 4254 Colonial ave Roanoke, Virginia; USA

Information
- Type: Independent, boarding, day, college preparatory school
- Motto: Veritas Vincit
- Religious affiliation: Nonsectarian
- Established: 1944
- Head of school: Armistead Lemon
- Faculty: 69.6
- Grades: K–12
- Gender: coeducational
- Enrollment: 514 (2021–22)
- Student to teacher ratio: 7.4
- Campus: Suburban
- Colors: Red & White
- Athletics conference: Virginia Independent Conference (boys); Blue Ridge Conference (girls)
- Mascot: Raider
- Nickname: Raiders
- Rival: Roanoke Catholic School; Carlisle School
- Accreditation: Virginia Association of Independent Schools; National Association of Independent Schools
- Tuition: $15,300–$23,300
- Website: www.northcross.org

North Cross School is an independent, coeducational, college-preparatory day school in Roanoke, Virginia for children from age three to twelfth grade. The school was founded in 1944 in Salem, Virginia.

== Accreditation ==
North Cross is accredited by the Virginia Association of Independent Schools.

== Memberships ==
North Cross is a member of the National Association for College Admission Counseling, the Potomac and Chesapeake Association for College Admissions Counseling, the Cum Laude Society and the Council for Advancement and Support of Education.
