= Richard D. Hearney =

United States Marine Corps general

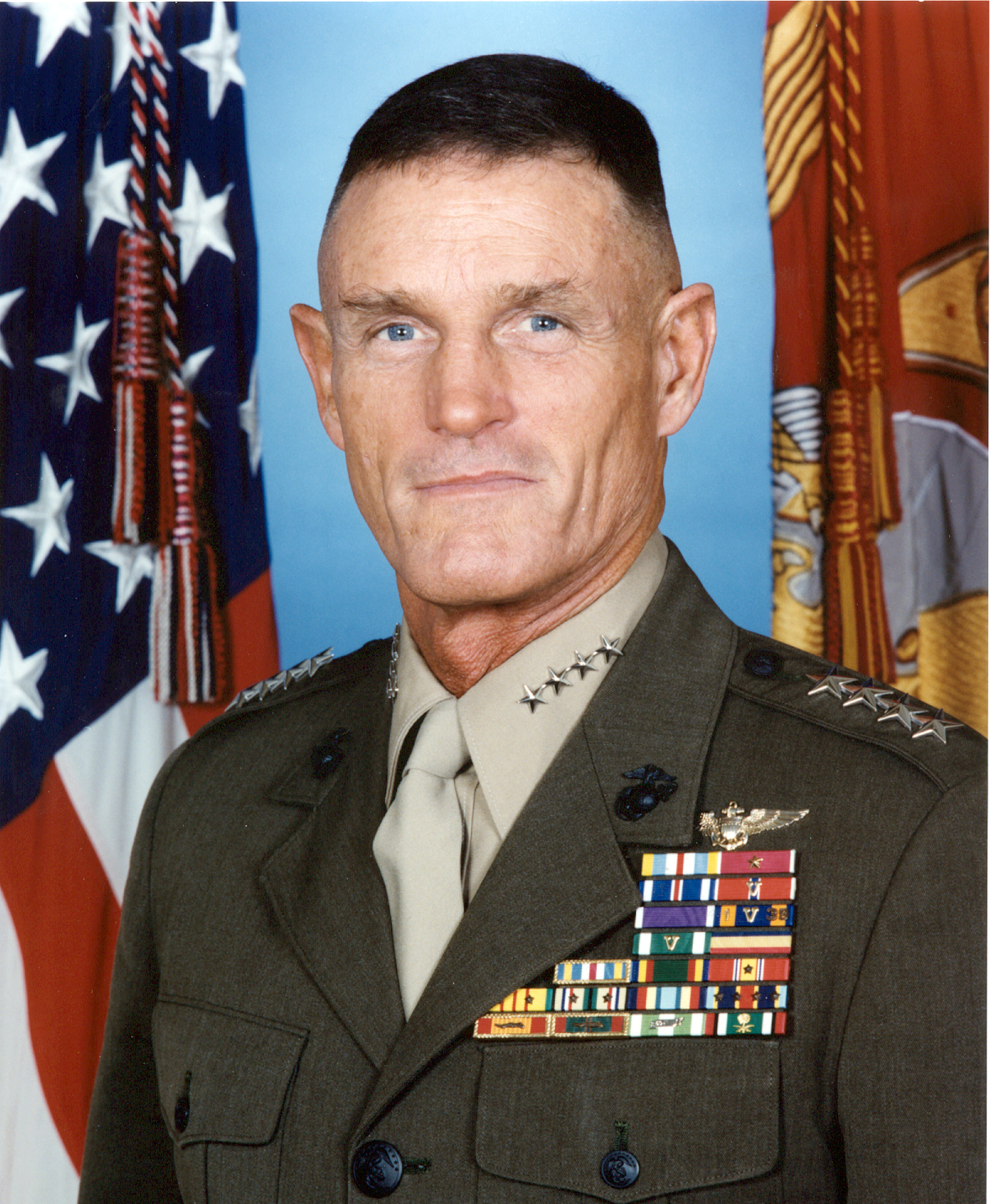
- Born: 1939; Petaluma, California, U.S.
- Military career
- Allegiance: United States of America
- Branch: United States Marine Corps
- Service years: 1962-1996
- Rank: General
- Conflicts: Vietnam War
- Awards: Navy Distinguished Service Medal; Defense Superior Service Medal; Legion of Merit (2); Distinguished Flying Cross; Bronze Star with "V"; Purple Heart

Richard Davis Hearney (born 1939) is a retired United States Marine Corps four-star general who served as the Assistant Commandant of the Marine Corps from 1994 to 1996.

== Early life ==
Hearney was born in 1939 in Petaluma, California. He graduated from Petaluma High School in 1957. On a scholarship to play football, he earned a bachelor's of science from Stanford University. Later, he would earn a master's of science from Pepperdine University. He graduated from the Naval War College in June 1980.

Hearney was commissioned a second lieutenant in 1962 following completion of the Platoon Leaders Class program. He holds a B.S. degree from Stanford University and an M.S. degree from Pepperdine University.

== Career ==
Hearney commanded at the squadron, air group, and air wing level. During Desert Shield and Desert Storm he served as Deputy Commander, I MEF. His staff tours included Deputy Director, J-3, U.S. European Command as well as Deputy Chiefs of Staff for Requirements and Programs, and Aviation at Headquarters Marine Corps, Washington, D.C. General Hearney was advanced to general and assumed the position of assistant commandant on July 15, 1994.

He graduated from the Naval War College in June 1980. General Hearney currently sits on the Honorary Board for the nonprofit Wine Country Marines. [1]

== Personal life ==
In the 2024 United States presidential election, Hearney endorsed Kamala Harris.

== Awards and decorations ==
His personal decorations and medals include:

Naval Aviator Badge
Navy Distinguished Service Medal
Defense Superior Service Medal	Legion of Merit w/ 1 award star	Distinguished Flying Cross	Bronze Star w/ valor device
Purple Heart	Air Medal w/ valor device, gold award numeral "1" and bronze Strike/Flight numeral "38"	Navy and Marine Corps Commendation Medal w/ valor device	Navy Presidential Unit Citation
Joint Meritorious Unit Award	Navy Unit Commendation	National Defense Service Medal w/ 1 service star	Vietnam Service Medal w/ 2 service stars
Southwest Asia Service Medal w/ 2 service stars	Navy Sea Service Deployment Ribbon	Navy & Marine Corps Overseas Service Ribbon w/ 4 service stars	Vietnam Gallantry Cross unit citation
Vietnam Civil Actions unit citation	Vietnam Campaign Medal	Kuwait Liberation Medal (Saudi Arabia)	Kuwait Liberation Medal (Kuwait)

Military offices
Preceded by Walter E. Boomer	Assistant Commandant of the Marine Corps; 1994-1996	Succeeded by Richard I. Neal
