= Terrence R. Dake =

United States Marine Corps general

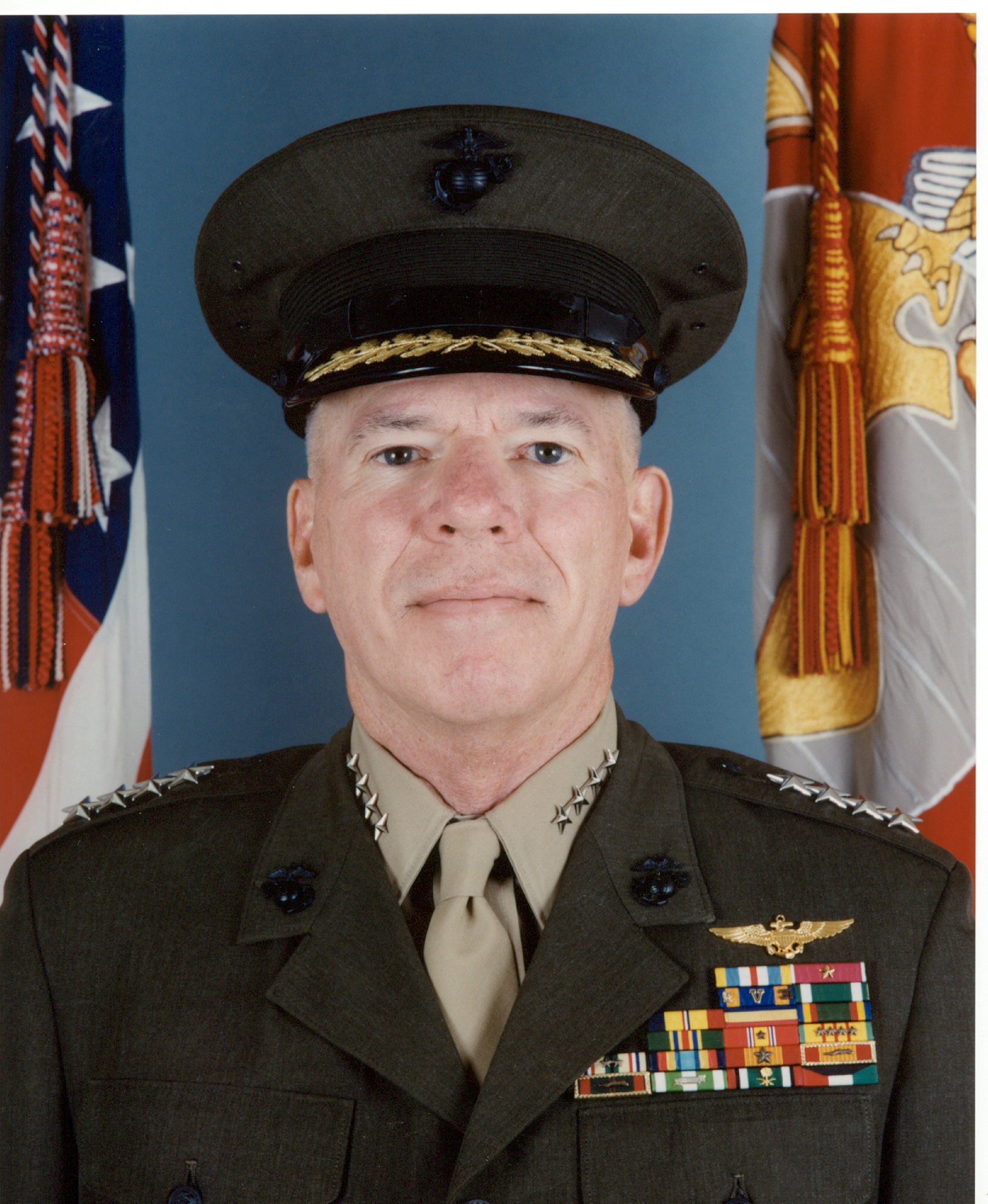
- General Terrence R. Dake
- Born: July 22, 1944 (age 82); Omaha, Nebraska, United States
- Military career
- Allegiance: United States of America
- Branch: United States Marine Corps
- Service years: 1966–2000
- Rank: General
- Commands: Marine Helicopter Squadron One; Inspector General of the Marine Corps; 3rd Marine Aircraft Wing; Asst. Commandant of the Marine Corps
- Conflicts: Vietnam War; Desert Storm/Desert Shield
- Awards: Defense Superior Service Medal; Legion of Merit
- Other work: Bell Helicopter Textron, Sr VP

Terrence Rex Dake (born July 22, 1944) is a retired United States Marine Corps four-star general who served as Assistant Commandant of the Marine Corps (ACMC) from 1998 to 2000.

== Biography ==
Terrence Dake was born on July 22, 1944, in Omaha, Nebraska. He was raised in the Missouri Ozarks in Rocky Comfort, Missouri. He earned undergraduate degrees from the College of the Ozarks and the University of Arkansas, where he studied history and served as president of the Tau Kappa Epsilon fraternity chapter during the fall semester of his senior year. He holds a Master of Arts degree from Pepperdine University. He was commissioned a second lieutenant upon graduation from Officer Candidate School in October 1966. Dake was designated a Naval Aviator at Pensacola, Florida, on the January 25, 1968.

Dake logged more than 6,000 flight hours in military aircraft. Significant flying tours include a combat tour in Vietnam in 1968-69 flying CH-53A helicopters; Commanding Officer of Marine Helicopter Squadron One, designated as the President's helicopter pilot, 1983–1985; Commanding General of the 3rd Marine Aircraft Wing, July 1995 - July 1996. General Dake has flown helicopters in every aircraft wing in the Marine Corps. Additionally, he served as the Assistant Chief of Staff of Operations, G-3 for the 3rd Marine Aircraft Wing in Desert Shield and Desert Storm, the largest aircraft wing ever fielded in combat by the Marine Corps.

Dake served as the Director of Joint Training and Doctrine with the Commander-in-Chief of the United States Atlantic Command from July 1987 - July 1990.

Promoted to brigadier general in March 1992, Dake's assignments as a general officer were: Assistant Deputy Chief of Staff of Aviation; Inspector General of the Marine Corps; Deputy Commanding General, Marine Corps Combat Development Command; Commanding General, 3rd Marine Aircraft Wing and Deputy Chief of Staff for Aviation.

Dake was advanced to the rank of general and assumed his position as the Assistant Commandant of the Marine Corps on September 5, 1998. He retired on September 7, 2000.

== Awards ==
Dake's personal decorations include:

Naval Aviator Badge					Presidential Service Badge
1st Row		Defense Superior Service Medal	Legion of Merit w/ 1 award star		Presidential Service Badge
2nd Row	Air Medal w/ valor device, gold award numeral "2" and bronze Strike/Flight numeral "31"	Navy and Marine Corps Commendation Medal	Combat Action Ribbon	Navy Presidential Unit Citation	Presidential Service Badge
3rd Row	Navy Unit Commendation	Navy Meritorious Unit Commendation	National Defense Service Medal w/ 1 service star	Vietnam Service Medal w/ 4 service stars	Presidential Service Badge
4th Row	Southwest Asia Service Medal w/ 2 service stars	Navy Sea Service Deployment Ribbon	Vietnam Gallantry Cross w/ bronze star	Vietnam Gallantry Cross unit citation	Presidential Service Badge
5th Row	Vietnam Civil Actions unit citation	Vietnam Campaign Medal	Kuwait Liberation Medal (Saudi Arabia)	Kuwait Liberation Medal (Kuwait)	Presidential Service Badge

== See also ==
- Commandant of the Marine Corps

Military offices
Preceded by Richard I. Neal	Assistant Commandant of the Marine Corps; 1998-2000	Succeeded by Michael J. Williams
