= Walter E. Boomer =

United States Marine Corps general

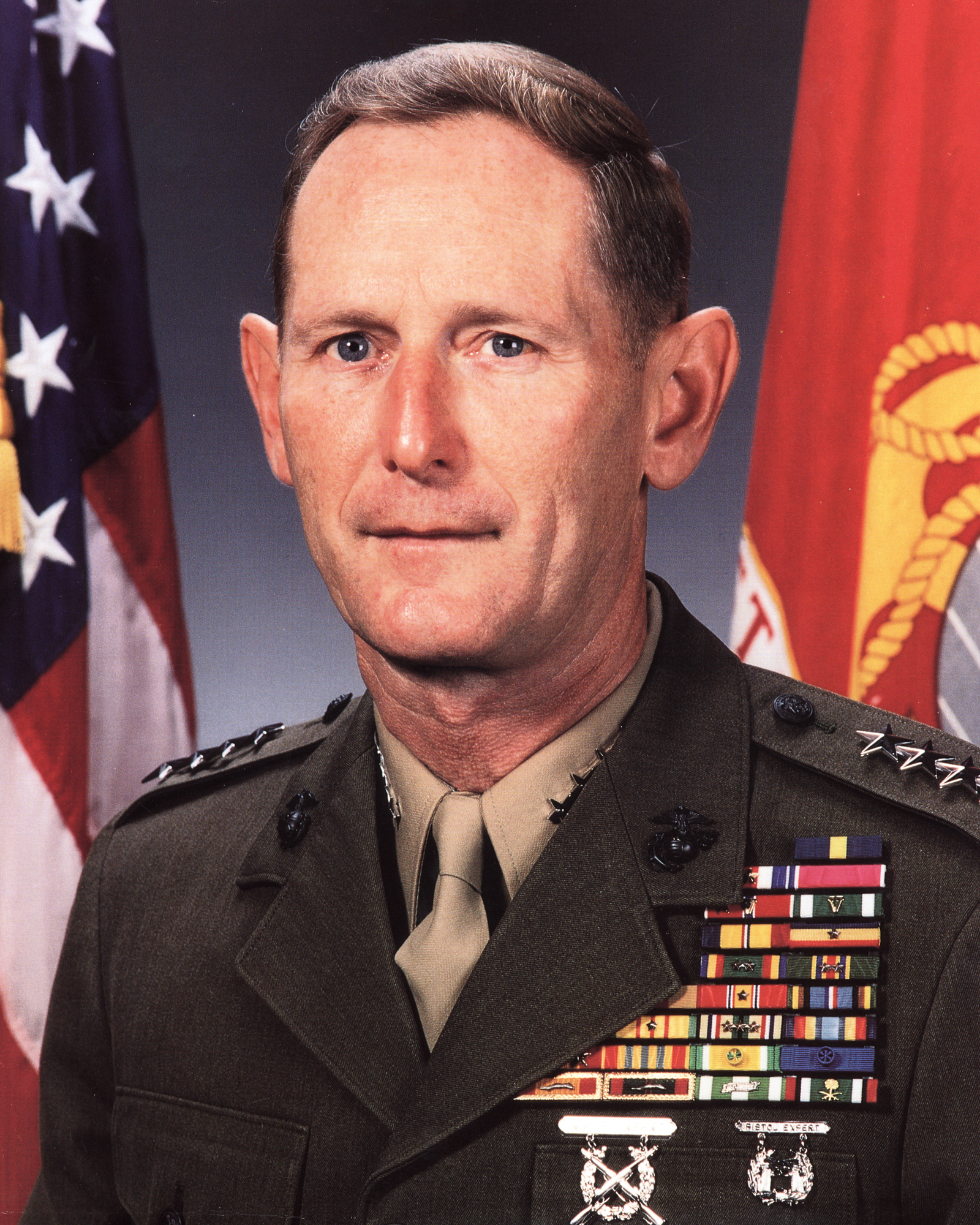
- General Walter E. Boomer, USMC
- Born: September 22, 1938 (age 88); Rich Square, North Carolina, U.S.
- Military career
- Allegiance: United States
- Branch: United States Marine Corps
- Service years: 1960–1994
- Rank: General
- Commands: Assistant Commandant of the Marine Corps; Marine Corps Combat Development Command; Marine Forces Central Command; Camp Pendleton; I Marine Expeditionary Force; 4th Marine Division; 4th Marine Corps Recruiting District; Marine Security Guard Battalion; 2nd Battalion, 3rd Marines
- Conflicts: Vietnam War; Gulf War; Operation Desert Storm; Operation Desert Shield
- Awards: Distinguished Service Medal; Silver Star (2); Legion of Merit; Bronze Star (2)
- Other work: Rogers Corporation, CEO McDermott International Inc, Exec. VP Babcock & Wilcox Power Generation Group, President

General Walter Eugene Boomer (born September 22, 1938) is a retired four-star general and assistant commandant of the United States Marine Corps and business executive. Boomer led all Marines in Operations Desert Shield and Desert Storm during the Gulf War. He was later the chairman and CEO of Rogers Corporation and retired in 2004. He is the current lead director of Baxter International. Boomer is a 1960 graduate of Duke University and later earned a master's degree from American University.

== Biography ==
Boomer was born on 22 September 1938 in Rich Square, North Carolina. In 1956, he graduated from Randolph-Macon Academy in Front Royal, Virginia. He earned a B.A. degree from Duke University in 1960, and was commissioned a second lieutenant in the U.S. Marine Corps. He earned a Master of Science degree in technology of management from American University, Washington, D.C. in 1973.

=== Marine Corps service ===
After completing The Basic School, Quantico, Virginia, in January 1961, his first assignments were with the 1st Battalion, 8th Marines and the 2nd Battalion, 2nd Marines, 2nd Marine Division, Camp Lejeune, where he was platoon commander, weapons platoon commander and battalion training officer, respectively, from 1961 to 1964. He was promoted to first lieutenant in December 1961 and to captain in April 1965.

Boomer saw combat action from 1966 to 1967 in the Republic of Vietnam as the commanding officer, Company H, 2nd Battalion, 4th Marines. During this combat tour, he was awarded the Silver Star Medal for valor. Returning to the US, he attended the Amphibious Warfare School at Quantico. On completion, he was promoted to major in May 1968, and was transferred to Headquarters Marine Corps, Washington, D.C., for duty as the administrative assistant and aide-de-camp to the Deputy Chief of Staff for Plans and Programs. Following this assignment, he attended the Armed Forces Staff College in Norfolk, Virginia.

In 1971, Boomer attended the Short Advisors Course at Fort Bragg, North Carolina, in preparation for advisor duty with the South Vietnamese Marines. In August that year, he returned to Vietnam as an advisor to the 4th Vietnamese Marine Corps Battalion. While serving this tour of duty, he was involved in the defense of Firebase Sarge during the Easter Offensive, North Vietnam's largest assault on the South.

Transferred back to the US in September 1972, he attended American University, receiving his M.S. degree in December 1973. The following month, he began a three-year tour as a management instructor at the U.S. Naval Academy, Annapolis, Maryland. During the last year of his tour, he was the chairman of the Department of Management. He was promoted to lieutenant colonel in September 1976.

From July 1977 to June 1980, Boomer was stationed in Hawaii, where he was executive officer, 3rd Marines, 1st Marine Brigade, and then commanding officer, 2nd Battalion, 3rd Marines. Returning to the mainland US in July 1980, he attended the Naval War College, Newport, Rhode Island, graduating with distinction in June 1981.

He then assumed the duties as the deputy director of the Fourth Marine Corps District, Philadelphia. He was promoted to colonel on 1 November 1981 and became the director of the Fourth Marine Corps District on 17 June 1983.

During February 1985, Boomer returned to Quantico to assume command of the Marine Security Guard Battalion. While serving in this capacity, he was selected in April 1986 for promotion to brigadier general. He was advanced to that grade on 2 June 1986 and assigned duty as the director of public affairs, Headquarters Marine Corps, on 7 June 1986. He held this post until 27 May 1988, when he was assigned duty as the commanding general, 4th Marine Division (Reinforced), FMF, New Orleans. On 14 March 1989, he was advanced to major general and promoted to lieutenant general on 8 August 1990.

On 15 August 1990, Boomer was deployed to Saudi Arabia, where he was the commanding general, U.S. Marine Forces Central Command (MARCENT) and I Marine Expeditionary Force during Operations Desert Shield and Desert Storm.

On 22 April 1991, he returned to Camp Pendleton and assumed the duties of commanding general, I Marine Expeditionary Force/commanding general, Marine Corps Base. He served in this capacity until 6 September 1991. Boomer reported to Quantico, Virginia, on 27 September 1991, where he assumed duty as the commanding general, Marine Corps Combat Development Command. He was promoted to general on 1 September 1992 and assumed his last duty assignment as assistant commandant of the Marine Corps.

Boomer retired from the Marine Corps 1 September 1994.

== Awards and honors ==
Boomer's medals and decorations include:

1st Row	Navy Distinguished Service Medal	Silver Star w/ 1 award star	Legion of Merit	
2nd Row	Bronze Star w/ 1 award star & V device	Navy and Marine Corps Commendation Medal w/ V device	Combat Action Ribbon	Navy Presidential Unit Citation w/ 1 service star
3rd Row	Navy Unit Commendation w/ 2 service stars	Navy Meritorious Unit Commendation w/ 2 service stars	Marine Corps Expeditionary Medal	National Defense Service Medal w/ 1 service star
4th Row	Armed Forces Expeditionary Medal	Vietnam Service Medal w/ 1 service star	Southwest Asia Service Medal w/ 3 service stars	Navy Sea Service Deployment Ribbon
5th Row	Vietnam Gallantry Cross w/ palm and silver star	Vietnam Armed Forces Honor Medal, 1st class	King Faisal Award, 2d Class	Ordre national du Mérite, Officer class
6th Row	Vietnam Gallantry Cross unit citation	Vietnam Civil Actions unit citation	Vietnam Campaign Medal	Kuwait Liberation Medal (Saudi Arabia)
Badges	EXPERT RIFLE badge		EXPERT PISTOL badge	

== Post-Marine Corps career ==
After retiring from the Marine Corps, General Boomer was executive vice president of McDermott International (1994–1996). He joined Rogers Corporation – an international specialty materials manufacturing company — in 1997 as president and CEO. From 2002 to 2004, he was chairman of the board of Rogers Corporation. Boomer is currently on the board of directors of Rogers Corporation, Cytyc Corporation and Baxter International.

== See also ==
- List of United States Marine Corps four-star generals
- Commandant of the Marine Corps

Military offices
Preceded by John R. Dailey	Assistant Commandant of the Marine Corps; 1992-1994	Succeeded by Richard D. Hearney
