= Dale E. Twomley =

Dale E. Twomley is an American businessman, educator and author. He was the CEO of Worthington Foods, Inc. and was heavily involved in its sale to Kellogg.

== Education ==
Twomley was born to a Seventh-day Adventist family in Michigan. He attended an Adventist elementary school and then an Adventist high school — Adelphian Academy in Holly, Michigan.. He received his bachelor's degree in business administration from Andrews University in Michigan, his MBA from the University of Tennessee and his Ph.D. in Administration from the University of Maryland.

== Worthington Foods ==
Dale Twomley was President and CEO of Worthington Foods, from 1986 to 1999, when the company was acquired by Kellogg's. During his time in leadership, he oversaw negotiations to acquire Loma Linda Foods and the acquisition of property in Zanesville, Ohio and the construction of a plant on the property.

== Other activities ==
As of January 2015, Dale Twomley was the principal of Shenandoah Valley Academy. Previously, he was a co-chair of the President's Council of Andrews University in Michigan. He had previously served as principal of a number of Seventh-day Adventist secondary institutions, including Shenandoah Valley Academy and Mount Vernon Academy, as well as advisor to Takoma Academy. He is currently the CEO of Fletcher Academy, Inc. In 1994, Twomley was considered for the Presidency of Andrews University and was one of six finalists for the position.

== See also ==
- Shenandoah Valley Academy
- Andrews University
