= Rudlin Torah Academy =

Jewish private school in Richmond, Virginia

Coordinates: 37.564389°N 77.486885°W

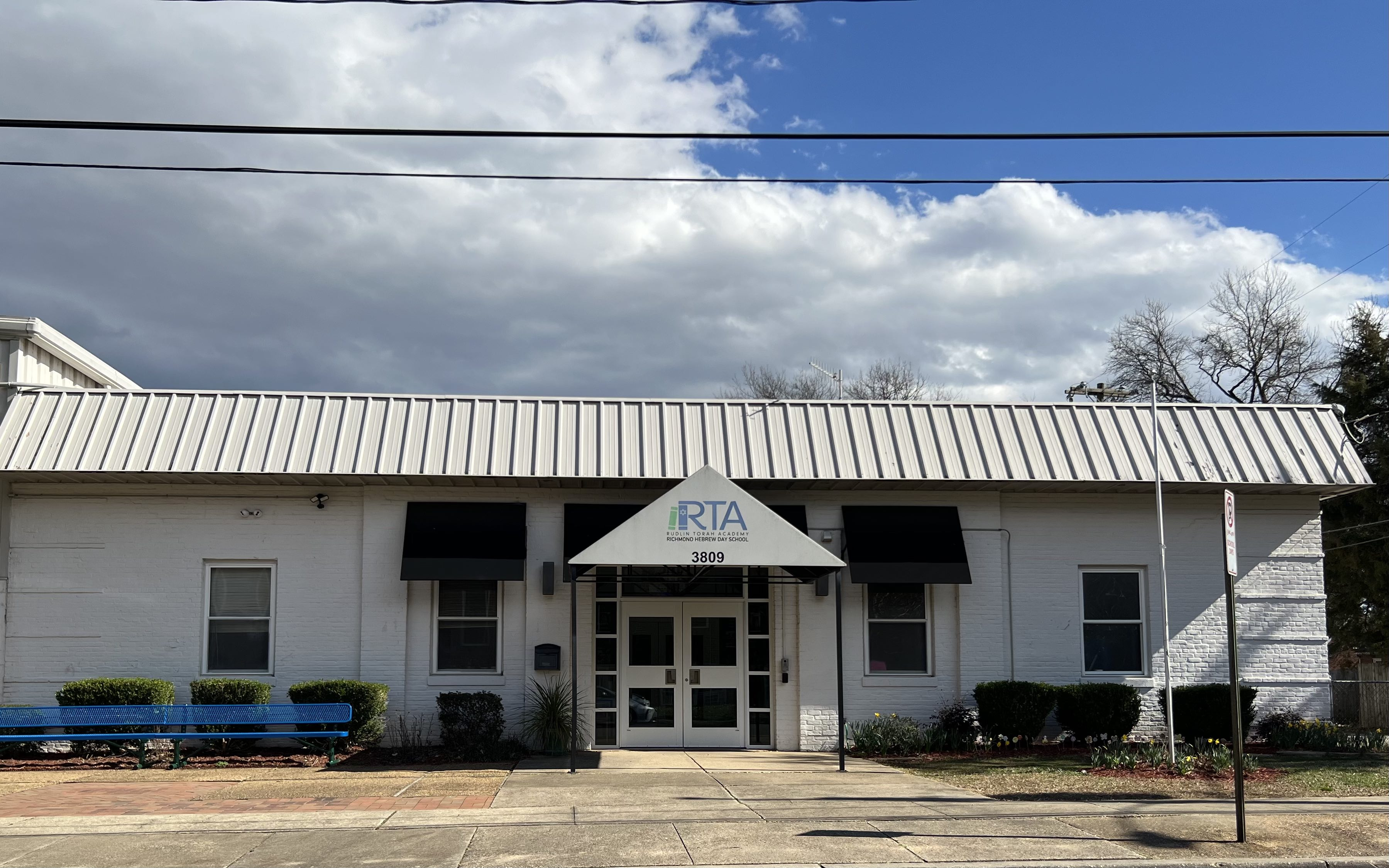
Rudlin Torah Academy in Richmond, Virginia.

Rudlin Torah Academy, founded as the Richmond Hebrew Day School, is a coeducational Jewish private day school located in Richmond, Virginia, serving students from kindergarten to eighth grade. The school is a member of the Virginia Association of Independent Schools.

It has round about 100 students studying there each year.

== History ==
In September 1966, the Richmond Hebrew Day School was opened at the Jewish Academy of Richmond, making it the first Jewish school in the area. The school was independent of the academy and had its own board of directors. The first intake of students saw seven first graders and three kindergarten students attend.

In September 1969, the school moved from the Jewish Academy and began teaching classes at a local Jewish community center. In January 1974, the school moved into a new $275,000 building.

In 1979, the school was renamed the Joseph and Fannie Rudlin Torah Academy following a financial endowment from the couple.
