= Carlisle School =

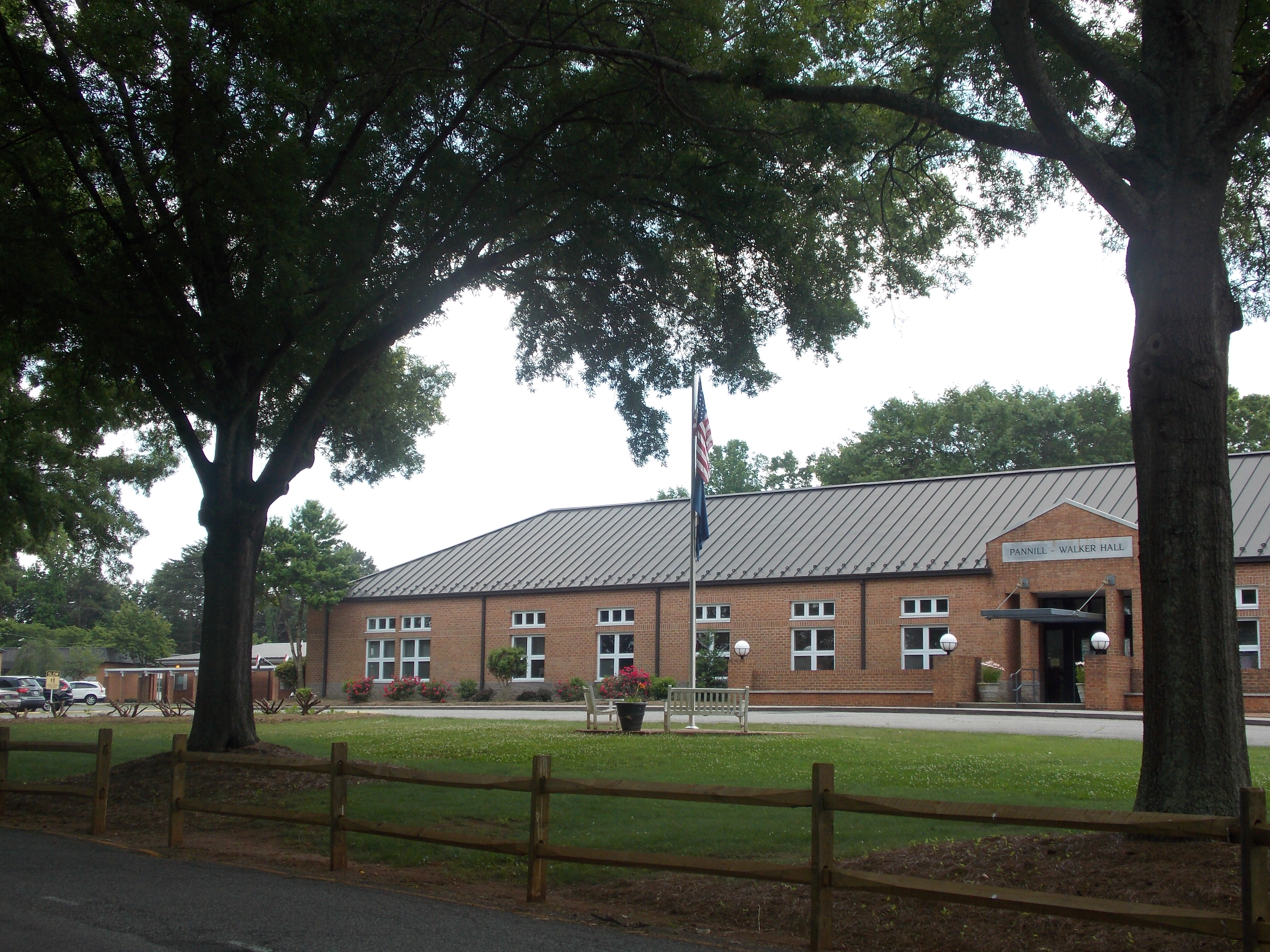
- 300 Carlisle Road (Axton), Martinsville, Virginia 24115; United States

Information
- Type: Private; Independent; day; college-preparatory school
- Motto: Lead, Excel, Succeed
- Religious affiliation: Nonsectarian
- Established: 1968; 58 years ago
- NCES School ID: 01433703
- President: Jennifer Thomas
- Head of school: Neal Meyer
- Grades: Pre-Kindergarten–12
- Gender: co-education
- Enrollment: 340 (2022-23)
- Average class size: 13
- Student to teacher ratio: 12:1
- Hours in school day: 7:45AM-5:15PM
- Campus type: Rural
- Colors: Navy, Gold, and White
- Slogan: Character, Intellect, Leadership
- Athletics: basketball, baseball, cross country, bass fishing, golf, soccer, tennis, volleyball
- Athletics conference: Virginia Independent Schools Athletic Association (VISAA); Virginia Independent Conference (Boys); Blue Ridge Conference (Girls)
- Nickname: Chiefs
- Team name: Carlisle Chiefs
- Rivals: North Cross School
- Accreditation: VAIS; SACS; SAIS
- Publication: Blue & Gold
- School fees: Application: $85; Enrollment: $200; Technology: $175; Athletic: $100
- Tuition: International students (6–12): $15,000–$18,000; Lower school: $9,870–$11,490; Middle school: $11,490–$12,530; Upper school: $12,530–$13,780 (2025-26)
- Revenue: $4.29 million
- Admissions Officer: Sandy Bailey
- Website: www.carlisleschool.org

Carlisle School is a private, co-educational, college preparatory school located in the Axton community of Martinsville, Virginia, United States. Established in 1968, Carlisle serves day school students in grades Pre-kindergarten through twelfth grade. The school is non-profit and has a board of directors that oversees it.

== History ==
Carlisle School began in 1968 and was founded by local educators and business leaders in the Martinsville area. The school was accredited in 1974. The school operated satellite campuses in both Chatham and Danville, Virginia until their closures in 2013 and 2018.

== Admissions ==
All students applying to Carlisle must schedule a tour of the school by attending open houses, a scheduled appointment or virtual visit. Next, students must complete an application form and submit it along with an $75 application fee. The next steps will require a in-person student visit and assessment, completing student evaluations particularly submitting the two required general evaluations (Math and English), submit school records including standardized test results. After a student submits their application, the admissions committee will review and make a decision on the applicant. If the applicant is accepted, families can apply for financial assistance if needed.

== Academics ==
Carlisle School offers a college-preparatory curriculum including Honors, Advanced Placement and Dual Enrollment Courses. Upper School students (Grades 9-12), in addition to their core curriculum, can choose to take various electives, such as Choir, Drama, Journalism, Engineering, Finance, and Business. They are also required to participate in one special-interest club.

Middle School (Grades 6-8) offers a curriculum in the areas of science, mathematics, languages and the humanities, and routinely requires students to complete interdisciplinary assignments that involve research, technological components, and writing. Students in the Middle School are also offered various electives.

The Lower School (Preschool 3 - Grade 5) curriculum is supplemented with instruction in the foreign language, technology, art, drama, creative movement, music, library, research, guidance, and physical education. A science laboratory and computer laboratory are available to students in Kindergarten through fifth grade.

== Athletics ==
Athletic options are open to all Middle and Upper School students. Athletic teams include baseball, boys and girls basketball, cross country, field hockey, golf, boys and girls soccer, swimming, boys and girls tennis, and volleyball. Boys teams compete in the Virginia Independent Conference and girls teams in the Blue Ridge Conference. The boys' basketball team received national attention with the acquisition of former five-star recruit and future NBA player Thon Maker. In the summer of 2022 Carlisle made a renovation to their gym floor. The boys' basketball team has won an overall 12 championships with 7 VISAA state championships and 5 Virginia Independent Conference championships, while the girls team has won 9 VISAA state championships including back to back titles from (2015–2018). On March 4, 2023, the girls basketball team won the VISAA division IV state championship.

The Carlisle golf team has won 14 Virginia Independent Conference championships and 1 VISAA state championship. In soccer, the boys team has won 5 VIC championships and 1 VISAA state championship, while the girls have won two Blue Ridge Conference championships.

== Arts ==
Choir, Dance, and Drama are made available to all students, and they routinely take part in on-stage musical and theatrical performances.

== International Program ==
Carlisle's Upper School (grades 9-12) students are approximately 80% local and 20% international from across the globe. In recent years, students have enrolled from Australia, India, Nigeria, China, Japan, Colombia, South Korea, Libya, Sudan, Finland, Mexico, Germany, Italy and Sweden. International students can choose a homestay option where they are hosted by a family in the community, or they can choose to live in the single-gender student houses located next to campus. Student houses hold 8 students apiece along with the dorm parents who offer guidance and create a sense of family. Other international students participate in a homestay program and live with Carlisle families. International students are supported by the Director of Residential Life, the International Program Coordinator and faculty mentors.

== Recognition ==
Carlisle School has been named the "Best Private School" in Southwest Virginia in 2012, 2013, 2014, 2015 and 2016 by the readers of "Virginia Living" magazine. According to Niche's 2025 Best Virginia Private School Rankings, Carlisle is ranked as the 27th best private K–12 school in Virginia.

== Accreditation ==
Carlisle School is accredited by the Southern Association of Independent Schools, the Virginia Association of Independent Schools, the Southern Association of Colleges and Schools, and is recognized by the Virginia Board of Education as an accredited school through the Virginia Council for Private Education.

== Notable alumni ==
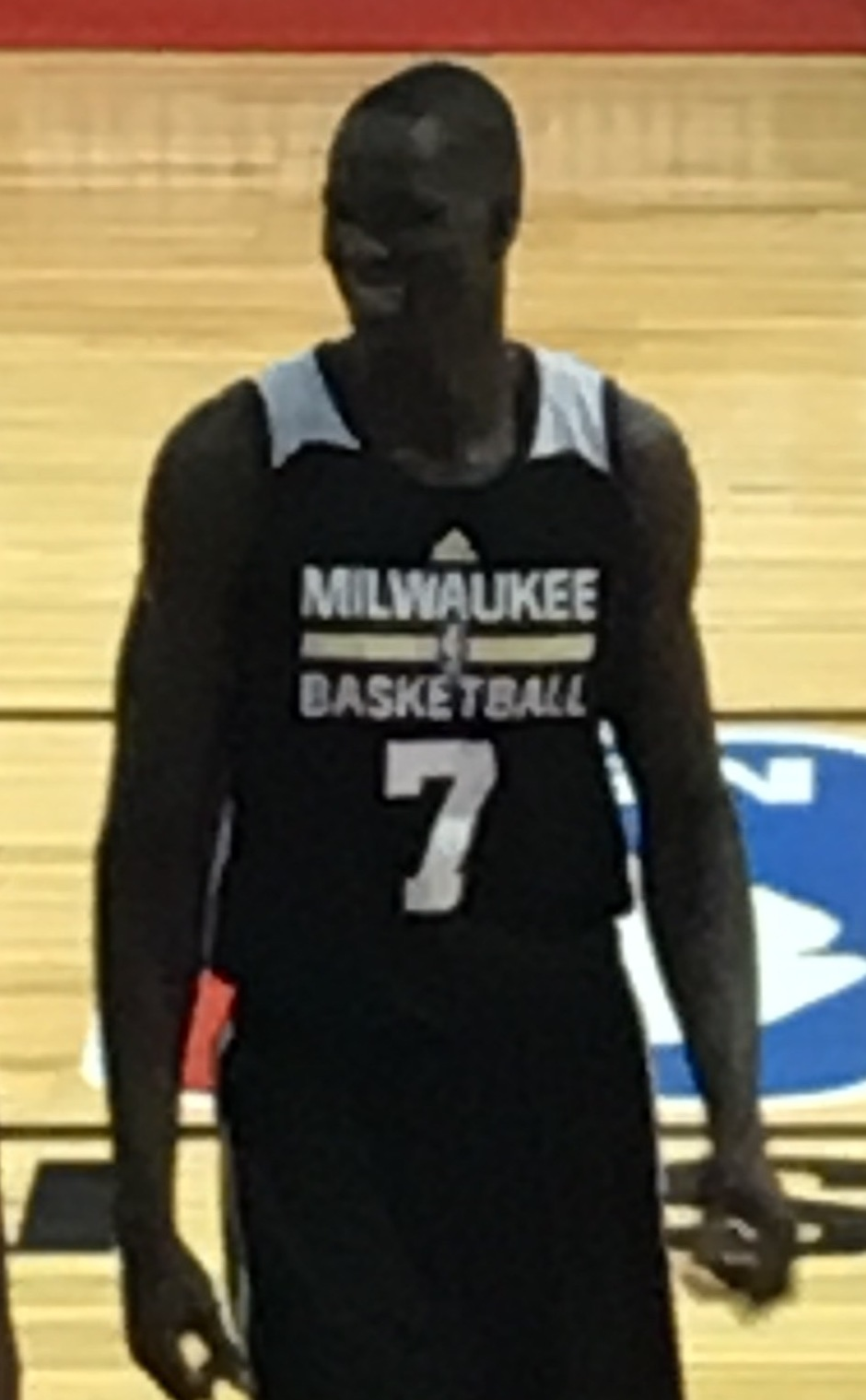
Thon Maker

- Rasir Bolton (transferred after sophomore year), professional basketball player
- Jeremy O. Harris, playwright, best known for Daddy and Slave Play
- Edward Kizza, professional soccer player for the New England Revolution
- Matur Maker (transferred after freshman year), professional basketball player
- Thon Maker (transferred after sophomore year), professional basketball player for the Detroit Pistons
