= Virginia Association of Independent Schools =

Non-profit, voluntary membership association of schools within Virginia

Virginia Association of Independent Schools (VAIS) is a non-profit, voluntary membership association of schools within the state of Virginia. The VAIS is a member of the National Association of Independent Schools. Prior to its establishment in Charlottesville, Virginia on April 30, 1973, a small number of independent schools’ headmasters known as “The Baker’s Dozen” met informally, teachers at their independent schools held conferences, and development coordinators hosted their own meetings to discuss commonly held educational issues. While the Virginia State Department of Education accredits independent and other nonpublic pre-school, elementary and secondary schools via the Virginia Council for Private Education (VCPE), the VAIS is a service organization that promotes educational, ethical and professional excellence.

According to their website, "the stated purposes of the Association have been to promote the well-being of and public regard for independent schools in the Commonwealth of Virginia; to safeguard the interests of these schools in matters of legislation and regulation; to act as an evaluating and accrediting organization for independent schools in Virginia; to foster mutually beneficial relations with the Virginia State Department of Education and other educational agencies; to assist member schools in maintaining standards of excellence; to encourage activities and to exchange information about new methodologies and practices; and to provide community service and leadership."

== Members of VAIS ==
VAIS members are not only located all across the state, but also the list comprises all grade levels, and both secular and religious schools.

=== Hampton Roads ===
- Broadwater Academy, Exmore
- Cape Charles Christian School, Cape Charles
- Chesapeake Bay Academy, Virginia Beach
- Christopher Academy, Portsmouth
- Hampton Roads Academy, Newport News
- Nansemond-Suffolk Academy, Suffolk
- Norfolk Academy, Norfolk
- Norfolk Christian Schools, Norfolk
- Norfolk Collegiate School, Norfolk
- Southampton Academy, Courtland
- Strelitz International Academy, Virginia Beach
- Tidewater Academy, Wakefield
- Virginia Beach Friends School, Virginia Beach
- The Williams School, Norfolk

=== Northern Virginia ===
- Alexandria Country Day School, Alexandria
- Browne Academy, Alexandria
- Burgundy Farm Country Day School, Rose Hill
- Commonwealth Academy, Alexandria
- Congressional School, Falls Church
- Episcopal High School, Alexandria
- Flint Hill School, Oakton
- Gesher Jewish Day School, Fairfax
- Grace Episcopal School, Alexandria
- Green Hedges School, Vienna
- The Langley School, McLean
- Linton Hall School, Bristow
- The Madeira School, McLean
- Montessori School of Northern Virginia, Falls Church
- The Potomac School, McLean
- St. Stephen's & St. Agnes School, Alexandria
- Trinity School at Meadow View, Falls Church
- Westminster School, Annandale

=== Northwest Virginia ===
- Foxcroft School, Middleburg
- Fredericksburg Academy, Fredericksburg
- Highland School, Warrenton
- The Hill School, Middleburg
- Loudoun Country Day School, Leesburg
- Middleburg Montessori School, Middleburg
- Powhatan School, Boyce
- Randolph-Macon Academy, Front Royal
- Saint James' Episcopal School, Warrenton
- Wakefield School, The Plains

=== Richmond ===
- Anna Julia Cooper School
- Benedictine College Preparatory
- Church Hill Academy
- Collegiate School
- Good Shepherd Episcopal School
- Millwood School
- The New Community School
- Northstar Academy
- Orchard House School
- Richmond Montessori School
- Riverside School
- Rudlin Torah Academy
- Sabot at Stony Point
- Seven Hills School
- St. Andrew's School
- St. Catherine's School
- St. Christopher's School
- St. Michael's Episcopal School
- The Steward School
- Trinity Episcopal High School

=== The River ===
- Aylett Country Day School, Bruington
- Chesapeake Academy, Irvington
- Christchurch School, Christchurch
- St. Margaret's School, Tappahannock
- Ware Academy, Gloucester

=== Southwest Virginia ===
- Boys Home of Virginia, Covington
- Chatham Hall, Chatham
- Community High School, Roanoke
- Hargrave Military Academy, Chatham
- James River Day School, Lynchburg
- New Covenant Schools, Lynchburg
- New Vistas School, Lynchburg
- North Cross School, Roanoke
- Carlisle School, Martinsville
- Oak Hill Academy, Mouth of Wilson
- Sullins Academy, Bristol
- Virginia Episcopal School, Lynchburg

=== Valley ===
- Blue Ridge School, St. George
- The Covenant School, Charlottesville
- Eastern Mennonite School, Harrisonburg
- Field School of Charlottesville, Crozet
- Fishburne Military School, Waynesboro
- Fork Union Military Academy, Fork Union
- Fuqua School, Farmville
- Grymes Memorial School, Orange
- The Miller School of Albemarle, Charlottesville
- Mountaintop Montessori School, Charlottesville
- St. Anne's-Belfield School, Charlottesville
- Stuart Hall School, Staunton
- Tandem Friends School, Charlottesville
- Woodberry Forest School, Woodberry Forest

== See also ==
- Independent school
- Education in Virginia
- National Association of Independent Schools
