= Linton Hall School =

Location
- 9535 Linton Hall Road; Bristow, Virginia 20136; United States; 38°45′4.1″N 77°34′7.4″W

Information
- Type: Private, Day
- Motto: Pax (Peace)
- Religious affiliation: Roman Catholic
- Established: 1922
- Head of school: Adrienne Jewett
- Grades: Preschool–8
- Gender: Coeducational
- Campus type: Rural
- Colors: Blue and yellow
- Slogan: Benedictine tradition, Community, Achievement
- Website: www.lintonhall.edu

Linton Hall School (formerly Linton Hall Military School) is a Catholic coeducational day-school occupying a 120-acre (49 ha) campus in Bristow, Virginia, in Prince William County about 36 mi (58 km) west of Washington, D.C. It is located within the Roman Catholic Diocese of Arlington.

== History ==
=== Early history ===
Linton Hall Military School in Bristow, Virginia (Prince William County, Virginia,) was founded on 1,700 acres of land originally donated for the education of poor boys and girls by Sarah Elliot Linton (born 1822, died 1891,) who took the name of Sister Baptista upon becoming a Visitandine nun at age 22. Sarah Linton had previously inherited the land from her father, John Tyler Linton, who had died just two months before Sarah's birth. The Benedictine Fathers established St. Maurus Boys' School in 1893; the Benedictine Sisters established St. Edith's Academy for girls in 1894. St. Edith's opened with sixteen boarders and several day students.[1] After World War I, the enrollment of both schools began to decline. The Benedictine Fathers returned to their abbey in Belmont, North Carolina. In 1922, the Benedictine Sisters founded St. Gertrude High School for girls in Richmond, Virginia. The same year, St. Edith's, in Bristow, was converted to Linton Hall Military School, a military boarding school for boys ages 6–16.

=== Linton Hall Military School ===
Linton Hall began as a military school; however, the military program was discontinued for a few years. In 1932, the military program was re-established. In 1940, two floors of St. Ann's Guest House were converted into dormitories. In 1946, the first floor of the main portion of the present building was completed and served as a residence hall for all the students. By 1951, the second and third floors and the classroom wing were completed. Physical education facilities included a gymnasium built in 1956, an outdoor swimming pool constructed in 1968, tennis courts, various playing fields, and a playground for younger children.

==== Daily life ====
During the 1940s, students were permitted one designated weekend per month "provided scholastic standing and conduct warrant it."

John Phillips (musician), who attended Linton Hall Military School from 1942 to 1946, and later gained fame as singer, songwriter and guitarist for The Mamas & the Papas, recalls in his autobiography that he "hated the place," even though he earned good grades, made many friends, and played sports. He writes of "the inspections and the beatings" and recalls that "nuns used to watch us take showers."

Students followed a strict schedule, particularly on weekdays, from rising at 6:45 a.m. to their 9:00 p.m. bedtime, with only 45 minutes of free play allocated on Mondays and Wednesdays, and two hours on Tuesdays, Thursdays, and Fridays, plus some time in the evening during 'rest' period in the dormitories. Cadets were not permitted to keep items such as food, money, or comic books, nor make or receive telephone calls, except in case of emergency.

After the new building was completed in the late 1940s, cadets were housed in dormitories, each of which contained approximately fifty beds, set in three rows, each bed separated from the next by a folding metal chair approximately 18 inches wide. There were no curtains on the windows and walls were bereft of any decoration, such as pictures or posters.

During the late 1950s, “Rules abounded for every single activity. How to brush our teeth, how to go to the bathroom, how to wear our clothes (uniforms), what shoes to wear, how long our hair could be etc. … Routinely we would get up at dawn, brush our teeth, and wash our faces. Get dressed, make our bed, organize our clothes for inspection, and have breakfast. We all wore the same uniform; khaki pants and shirt, black shoes and …. world war one olive green leggings! During cold weather, we wore a fatigue jacket that had a removable liner," according to Mario Salazar, in “Why would a parent do this, again.” He further states that “We were always hungry … Lunch was usually a cold bologna or cheese sandwich and milk …

After a day of classes and an insufficient snack, we would be formed in companies and drilled around the paved surface for approximately ninety minutes. We had to carry very heavy replica rifles. Some new kids would just give up and fall to the ground crying. The wrong move! They would be grabbed by the hair and made to hold the rifle above their heads. Both the nuns and the drill instructor would routinely grab a student by the hair and would walk around with him in tow for a while.”

When boys took a shower, “The dorm nun would stand at the door of the communal shower to make sure we washed properly … In my dorm, we ranged in ages from about twelve to sixteen, and most of us were sexually developed.” Conditions were quite similar a decade later.

As some of the boys were as young as seven, some of them would occasionally wet their bed, i.e., urinate while asleep. Rather than show empathy and understanding, the nuns would embarrass and humiliate them and subject them to bullying and ridicule for something over which they had no control. During the mid 1950s, bedwetters were forced to wear a girl’s party dress. During the 1960s, bedwetters were instead forced to wear the urine-soaked pajamas around their neck all day.

=== Foreign students ===
In 1951, students from Latin America, predominantly Mexico, began to enroll at Linton Hall. Over the years, the number of foreign students increased, until foreign students constituted a sizeable portion of the student body.

== Summer camp ==
For thirty-nine years Linton Hall operated a boarding summer camp program. In 1990 it was converted to a day program. In 1996 the day program was discontinued, and the grounds rented to various organizations during the summer.

== End of military program ==
By the 1978–1979 academic year, the school had dropped the word 'military' from its name, even though the military program still existed. During the early 1980s, as enrollment continued to decline, the Benedictine Sisters decided to discontinue the military program.

== Current ==
In 1988, Linton Hall School became a coeducational day school for students from kindergarten through eighth grade, and maintained its Catholic identity. Most of the land was sold to developers, with the school retaining approximately 120 acres. Enrollment during the 1988–1989 school year was 33 students.

== Boards ==
The Linton Hall Board of Visitors was founded in 1974 in order to assist the administration in forming policies concerning future growth, development, finances, public relations, and other areas of concern. The Board of Visitors was dissolved in 1991, giving way to the advisory board. In the 1975–1976 school year, a five-day resident program was offered to make the boarding facility available to more students. In addition to maintaining accreditation by the Virginia State Board of Education and membership in the National Catholic Education Association (NCEA), Linton Hall became a member of the Virginia Association of Independent Schools (VAIS) in 1977.
