= Shenandoah Valley Academy =

Location
- 234 West Lee Highway; New Market, Virginia 22844; United States; 38.650480°N 78.688945°W

Information
- School type: Parochial Private, Day & Boarding
- Religious affiliation: Seventh-day Adventist
- Established: 1908
- Authority: Potomac Conference of Seventh-day Adventists
- Principal: Becky Patrick
- Teaching staff: 13
- Grades: 9-12
- Gender: Co-educational
- Enrollment: 244 (2010)
- International students: 15%
- Average class size: 30
- Student to teacher ratio: 11:1
- Campus size: 450 acres (1.8 km^{2})
- Campus type: Rural
- Colors: Navy and White
- Slogan: Serve God, Value Knowledge, Accept a Life of Service
- Athletics conference: Cavalier Athletic Conference
- Sports: 7 Varsity Teams, 1 Junior Varsity Team
- Mascot: Stars
- Accreditation: Southern Association of Colleges and Schools, Virginia Council for Private Education, Accrediting Association of Seventh-day Adventist Schools
- ITED Composite average: 70th%
- Newspaper: Shen-Val-Lore
- Yearbook: Shenandoan
- Tuition: ≤$21,200
- Alumni: <6,000

Shenandoah Valley Academy (SVA) is a private, co-educational, boarding, high school in New Market, Virginia, United States. It has both boarding and day school programs serving approximately 250 students in grades 9 through 12. The campus is located in Virginia's Shenandoah Valley, approximately 90 minutes west of Washington, DC. It is accredited by the Southern Association of Colleges and Schools (SACS) and the Accrediting Association of Seventh-day Adventist Schools. It is a member of the Virginia Council for Private Education. The school was founded in 1908, with its first students enrolling that fall and graduated its first senior class in the spring of 1911.

== History ==
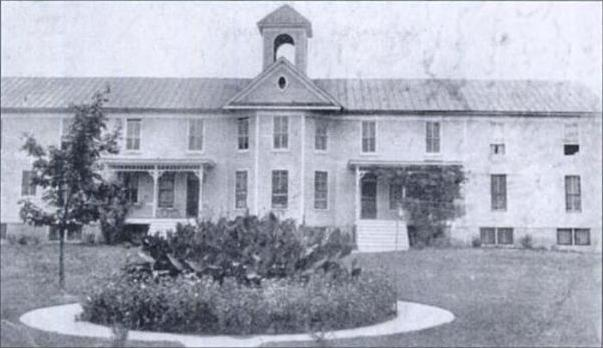
The original building at Shenandoah Valley Academy pictured in 1924. The building had numerous additions since the school was founded in 1908. It has long since been replaced by the modern Administrative Building.

In 1905 the dying Charles D. Zirkle of New Market bequeathed his share of his father’s property, a 42-acre piece of land on the outskirts of town, to the Virginia Conference of Seventh day Adventists. He wanted to have a school built for Adventist youth education. Two years later, construction began on what was originally known as New Market Academy. Since the name duplicated that of a former private school, it was changed to Shenandoah Valley Academy, still in use.

When the private school opened in September 1908, it had ten grades. That first year enrollment was 15 students, the first four of whom graduated in 1911. When founded, Shenandoah Valley Academy was the seventh Seventh-day Adventist academy in the United States to offer high-school level classes.

SVA did not operate in 1913-1914 because of extreme financial difficulties. From 1916 to 1921 the school was struggling to survive, but continued under the leadership of H. M. Forshee, Principal, and the help of Elder R. D. Hottel, pastor of the New Market Seventh-day Adventist Church. Hottel collected funds and foodstuffs for the needy school. In addition to losing students because of the Great War, in 1918 the school suffered from the Spanish flu epidemic; one person died and the school temporarily closed.

In the fall of 1927, W. C. Hannah became principal. He served for 26 years, the longest serving principal in SVA's history. He brought much advancement to the school and the campus.

Today most SVA students come from the states of Virginia and Maryland, but many come from other areas, namely from the Midwestern Region and the Mid-Atlantic states, and a few from the far South and West. There are also international students, from South Korea, Angola, Argentina and others nations of Latin America. As of 2019, SVA has graduated over 5,300 students.

== Campus ==
The school is located on a 450 acres (1.8 km^{2}) campus in Virginia's Shenandoah Valley, and is bordered on one side by the Shenandoah River. It has vistas of Massanutten Mountain. Most classes are held in Twomley Hall, which is also the home of the school administration, library, and auditorium. Hewitt Hall contains the student center and applied arts classrooms. The boys' dorm, Phanstiel Hall, and the girls' dorm, Hadley Hall, were fully renovated in the first decade of the 21st century.

== Academics ==
SVA's required curriculum includes classes in English, Science, Mathematics, and Social Studies, yearly religion courses, applied or fine arts, personal finance, and physical education. Foreign language as well as additional science and mathematics courses are required for the College Preparatory and Advanced Studies Diplomas. In addition to its core curriculum, SVA offers Advanced Placement (AP) classes and Dual Credit classes including English, Anatomy & Physiology, Physics, Precalculus, Calculus, Personal Finance, and 2 religion courses.

=== Diploma options ===
SVA offers three diploma tracks: an Advanced Studies Diploma, a College Preparatory Diploma, and a Standard Diploma. The Advanced Studies Diploma is designed for students expecting to apply to more selective schools.

== Student life ==
=== Performing arts ===
SVA has an active, award-winning, performing arts program. The department consists of two full-time faculty and several graduate students from James Madison University; they teach a full range of instrumental lessons to students at SVA. It is one of only 12 high schools in Virginia with a full orchestra. Music groups at SVA include the Shenandoans, an elite touring choir; the Valley Ringers, a handbell ensemble; and the Chorale, a large choir. In addition to these, there is a Concert Band and a String Ensemble. The Shenandoans, Valley Ringers, Concert Band and the Symphony Orchestra tour frequently. All of these groups make annual music tours to out-of-state or out-of- country location. Recent tour destinations have included Germany, Austria, Florida, and Costa Rica.

Praise Teams, which lead the school population in singing at its weekly chapel events, operate independently of the Music Department.

A drama club on campus has members who write and perform small plays for various elementary schools and to be performed at some school events.

=== Athletics ===
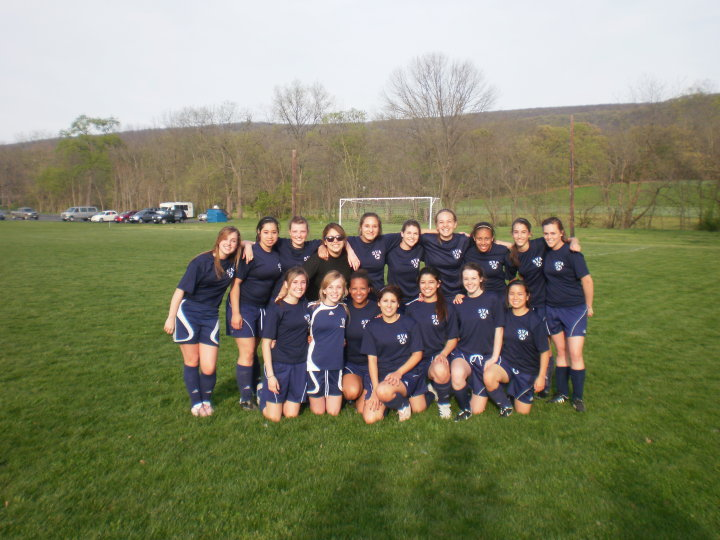
Shenandoah Valley Academy Stars girls' soccer team (April 2010)

The athletic department plays a large part in campus life at SVA. A large percentage of the student body participates in the eight interscholastic teams, and many more participate in its intramural sports.

==== Facilities ====
- The Charles Zirkle Gymnasium – Used as Basketball and Volleyball facility
- Full size professional soccer field (redone in Summer of 2009)
- Baseball field (redone in Summer of 2009)
- Heated Indoor Olympic Pool (Now decommissioned)
- Outdoor Track

Other sports meet on off campus locations such as the tennis courts in New Market, Virginia.

==== List of Interscholastic Teams ====
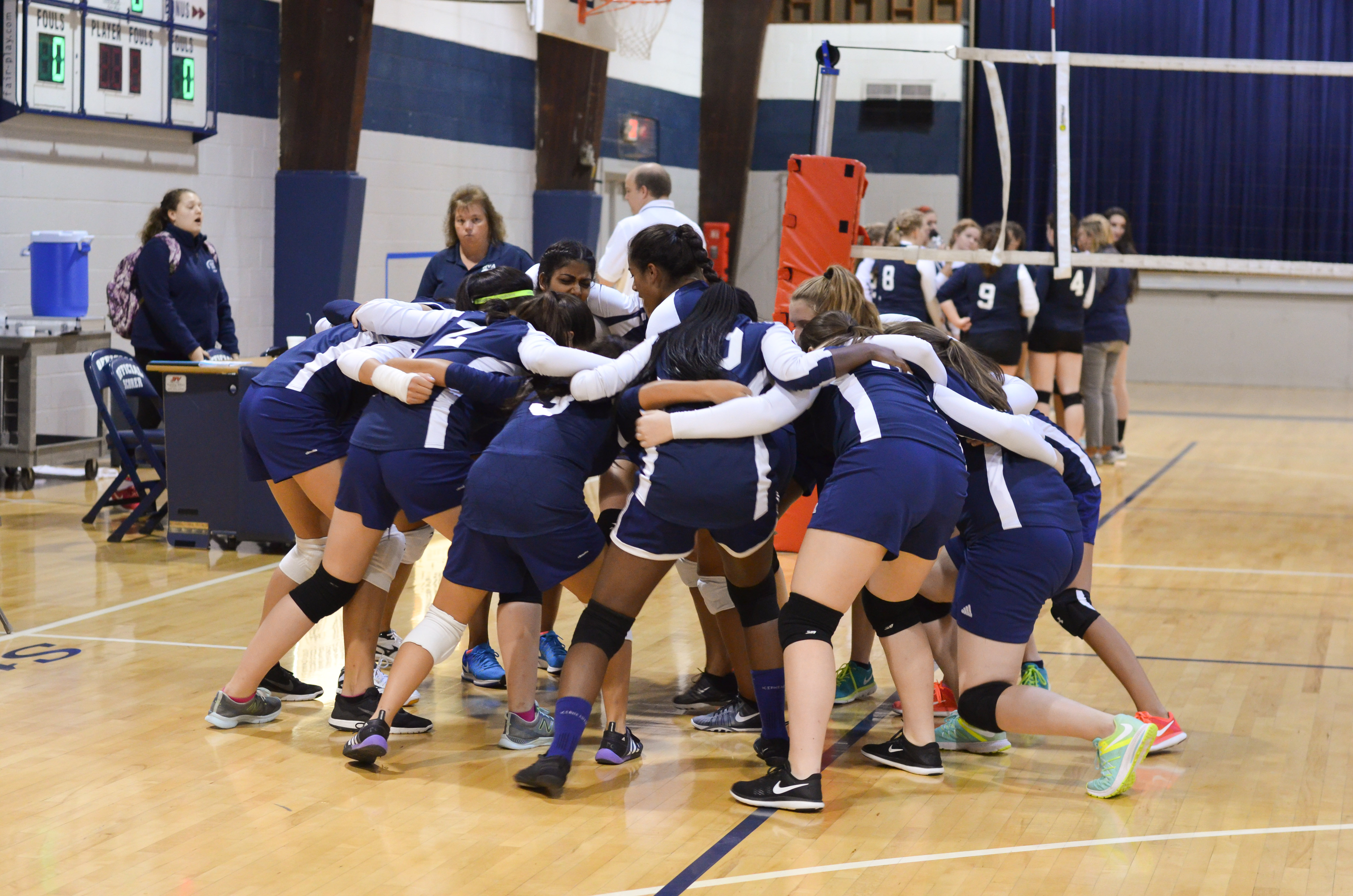
SVA Girls Volleyball (Late 2016)

Includes:

- Boys' Varsity Soccer (Fall)
- Girls' Varsity Volleyball (Fall)
- Boys' Varsity Basketball (Winter)
- Girls' Varsity Basketball (Winter)
- Boys' Varsity Baseball (Spring)
- Girls' Varsity Soccer (Spring)
- Boys' Junior Varsity Basketball (Winter)

== Notable alumni ==
- Astrid Heppenstall Heger, MD, Class of 1960, Professor of Clinical Pediatrics at the USC Keck School of Medicine and founder and Executive Director of the Violence Intervention Program (VIP) at Los Angeles County-USC Medical Center in East Los Angeles.
- Samuel H. Wood MD, Class of 1975, Scientist and fertility specialist. In 2008, he became the first man to clone himself
- James (Jim) Davis, DDS, Class of 1965, Member North Carolina General Assembly, Senate, 2011–2021.
- Dale E. Twomley, PhD, MBA, Class of 2009 honorary - Businessman, Educator, Administrator, former president and CEO of Worthington Foods, founding Dean of Andrews University School of Business, former three-time principal of Shenandoah Valley Academy.

== See also ==
- List of Seventh-day Adventist secondary schools
- Seventh-day Adventist education
