= Richard I. Neal =

US Marine Corps general (1942–2022)

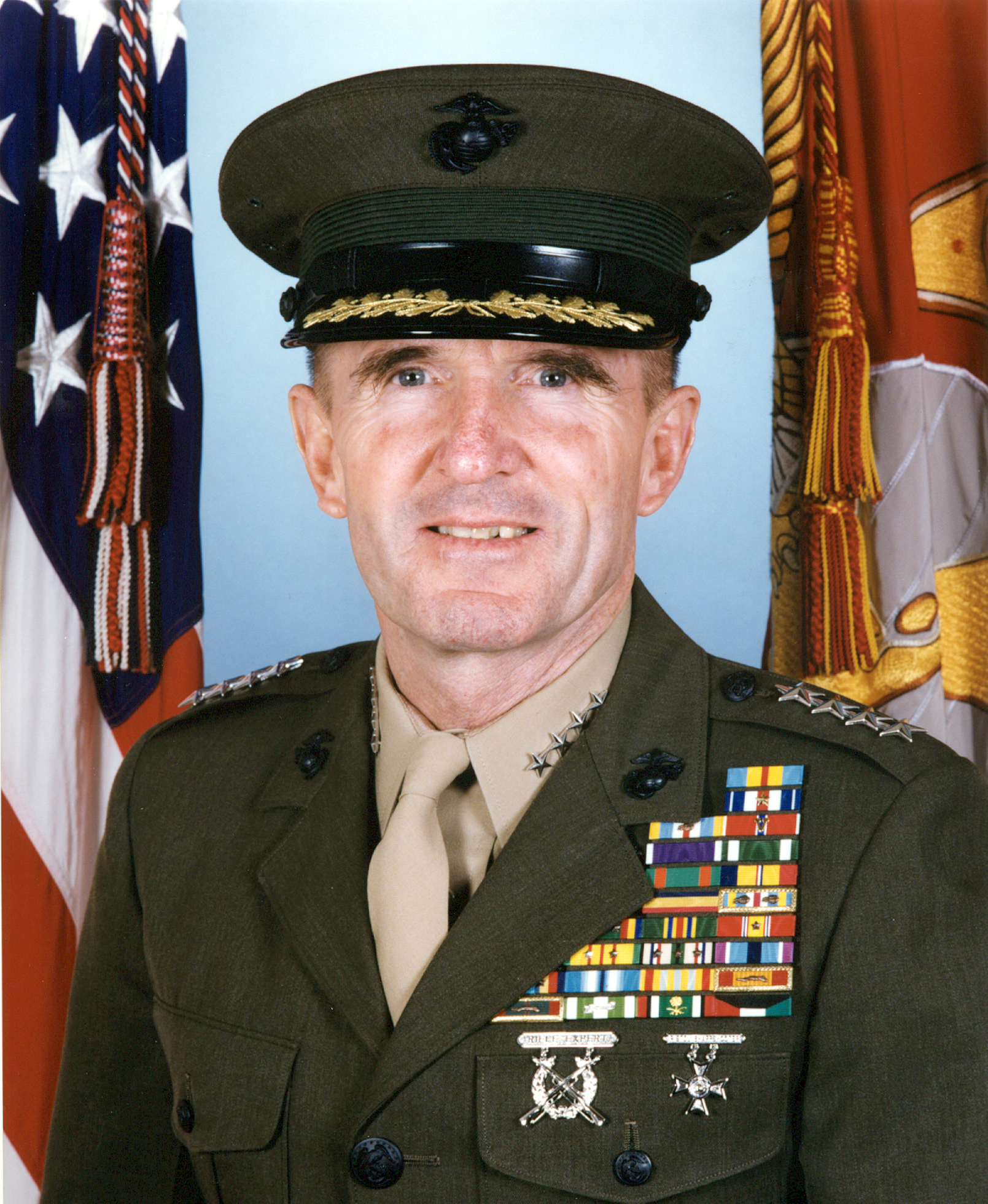
- General Richard Irving Neal
- Born: June 20, 1942; Hull, Massachusetts, U.S.
- Died: June 17, 2022 (aged 79)
- Military career
- Allegiance: United States of America
- Branch: United States Marine Corps
- Service years: 1965–1998
- Rank: General
- Commands: 2nd Marine Division
- Conflicts: Vietnam War
- Awards: Defense Distinguished Service Medal; Silver Star (2); Bronze Star with Combat "V"; Purple Heart
- Other work: Military Officers Association of America, Chairman

Richard Irving "Butch" Neal (June 20, 1942 – June 17, 2022) was a United States Marine Corps four-star general who served as Assistant Commandant of the Marine Corps (ACMC) from 1996 to 1998.

== Biography ==
Richard I. Neal born on June 20, 1942, in Hull, Massachusetts. He was commissioned as a second lieutenant in the U.S. Marine Corps upon graduation in 1965 from Northeastern University, where he received a B.S. degree in History and Education. He later earned a Master of Arts degree in Education from Tulane University (1973).

Following completion of The Basic School and subsequently the Field Artillery Officer Basic Course at Fort Sill, Oklahoma, Neal was assigned to the 3rd Marine Division in Republic of Vietnam, where he served as a Forward Observer with the 3rd Battalion 9th Marines. He returned to Vietnam in January 1970, where he was assigned as an Infantry Battalion Advisor to the Vietnamese Marine Corps. Upon his return he attended Amphibious Warfare School.

In 1973, he served as the Commanding Officer of the 2d 155 Howitzer Battery, 2d Field Artillery Group at Camp Lejeune, North Carolina. Following a tour as head of the Company Grade Assignment Section at Headquarters Marine Corps, he attended the Marine Corps Command and Staff College. He served on the Air-Ground Exchange Program as S-3, Marine Aircraft Group 36, on Okinawa. Upon return from overseas, General Neal was assigned as the Head, Operations Division, Amphibious Warfare School, Quantico. He was promoted to lieutenant colonel in 1981.

In 1982, he was selected to attend the National War College in Washington, D.C. Upon completion of school, he returned to Camp Lejeune to command the 5th Battalion, 10th Marines. Neal was promoted to colonel in 1985 and was assigned to the United States Central Command, MacDill Air Force Base, Florida, as the Chief of Policy/Strategy Division and later as the Chief of the Special Projects Division in the J-5 Directorate.

Neal was assigned duty as Director, Amphibious Warfare School, Quantico in August 1988. While serving in this capacity he was selected for promotion to brigadier general in December 1989.

In July 1990, Neal was advanced to brigadier general and assigned duty as the Director, Manpower Plans and Policy Division, Manpower and Reserve Affairs Department. He served in this capacity until May 1992. From September 1990 to April 1991, he was assigned temporary duty as the Deputy for Operations at U.S. Central Command for Operations Desert Shield/Desert Storm.

Neal was assigned as the Deputy Commanding General, II MEF in June 1992. From June 1992 - August 1992, he served as Commanding General, Joint Task Force for Operations GITMO, a humanitarian relief effort for Haitian migrants at Guantanamo Naval Base, Cuba.

Neal was advanced to major general in April 1993, and assigned as the Commanding General of the 2nd Marine Division. In August 1994, he was assigned as the Deputy Commander in Chief/Chief of Staff, U.S. Central Command, MacDill Air Force Base, and advanced to lieutenant general in October 1994.

Neal was promoted to four-star rank on September 19, 1996 and assumed duties as the Assistant Commandant of the Marine Corps on September 27, 1996. He retired on November 1, 1998.

After retiring from the Marine Corps, Neal served on various corporate boards and was associated with intellectual property rights in the private sector and defense-related companies.

== Awards ==
His personal decorations include:

1st Row	Defense Distinguished Service Medal	Silver Star w/ 1 award star	Defense Superior Service Medal w/ 1 oak leaf cluster	Bronze Star w/ valor device
2nd Row	Purple Heart	Navy and Marine Corps Commendation Medal	Navy and Marine Corps Achievement Medal	Combat Action Ribbon
3rd Row	Navy Presidential Unit Citation	Joint Meritorious Unit Award w/ 2 oak leaf clusters	Navy Unit Commendation w/ 2 service stars	Navy Meritorious Unit Commendation
4th Row	National Defense Service Medal w/ 1 service star	Vietnam Service Medal w/ 6 service stars	Southwest Asia Service Medal w/ 3 service stars	Humanitarian Service Medal
5th Row	Navy Sea Service Deployment Ribbon w/ 3 service stars	Arctic Service Ribbon	Vietnam Armed Forces Honor Medal	Vietnam Gallantry Cross unit citation
6th Row	Vietnam Civil Actions unit citation	Vietnam Campaign Medal	Kuwait Liberation Medal (Saudi Arabia)	Kuwait Liberation Medal (Kuwait)

Neal holds the Expert Rifle badge and the Pistol Sharpshooter badge.

== Personal life and death ==
In 1967, he married Kathy McCann; they would later have three children.

Neal died of complications from multiple strokes on June 17, 2022, three days before his 80th birthday.

Military offices
Preceded by Richard D. Hearney	Assistant Commandant of the Marine Corps; 1996-1998	Succeeded by Terrence R. Dake
