= Fredericksburg Academy =

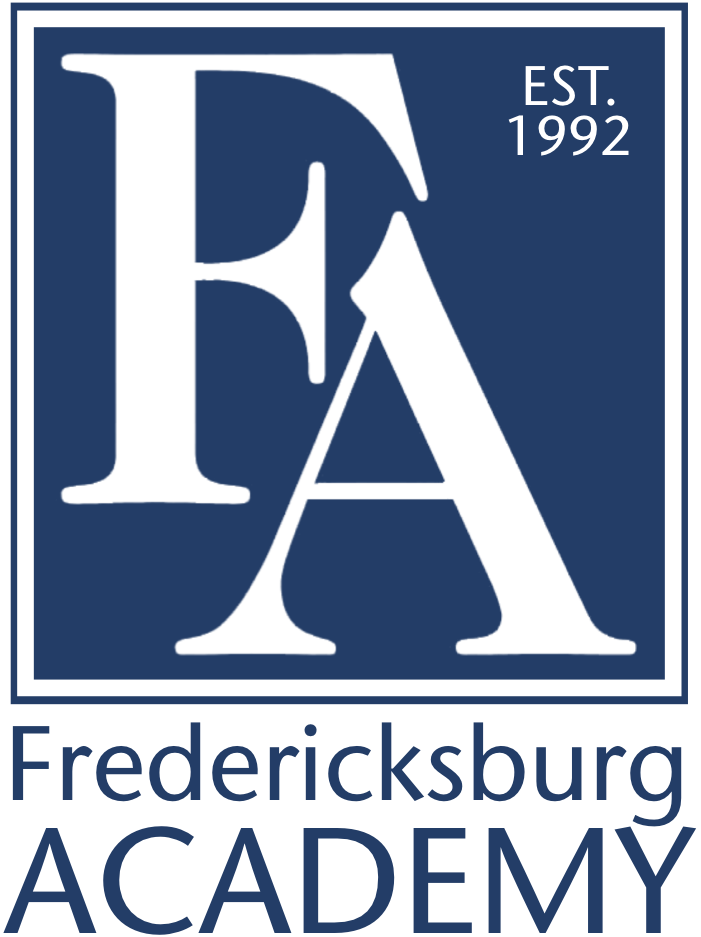

Location
- 10800 Academy Drive; Fredericksburg, Virginia; United States; 38°15′14.8″N 77°29′37.1″W

Information
- Type: Private, College-prep, Day
- Motto: Discover. Engage. Imagine.
- Established: 1992
- CEEB code: 470882
- Headmaster: Ms. Karen Moschetto
- Faculty: 93
- Grades: PK–12
- Gender: Co-Educational
- Enrollment: 370
- Average class size: 8
- Student to teacher ratio: 7:1 11
- Hours in school day: 8:30am - 3:20pm
- Campus size: 44 acres (18 ha)
- Campus type: Suburban
- Colors: Blue and Green
- Athletics conference: DAC
- Mascot: Freddy the Falcon
- Nickname: FA
- Accreditations: NAIS VAIS
- Newspaper: The Falcon Flyer
- Yearbook: The Talon
- Website: fredericksburgacademy.org

Fredericksburg Academy, or FA, is a co-educational independent school in Fredericksburg, Virginia. Created in 1992, FA enrolls 550 students in grades pre-kindergarten through 12th grade.

== Academics ==
Fredericksburg Academy is divided into three divisions:

- Upper School (9-12)
- Middle School (6-8)
- Lower School (PK-5)

The curriculum for each division: Lower School: Leisure, unscheduled classes [teacher classrooms for each grade] Middle/ Upper School: Goes to each period by A-G days with only 6 periods a day.

=== AP at FA ===
Advanced Placement courses are offered to Upper School students, beginning in their sophomore year. The AP classes offered include AP World History, AP Chemistry, AP Physics, AP Biology, AP English Literature and Composition, AP Calculus AB, AP Calculus BC, AP Statistics, AP European History, AP United States History, AP United States Government, AP US Government and Economics, AP Latin, AP Studio Art, AP Psychology, and AP Computer Science.

=== Exhibit ===
Fredericksburg Academy is the only school in the Fredericksburg area that requires students to complete a senior project as a requirement for graduation. Starting their Freshman year, each student selects a topic of interest which must be approved by their Exhibit mentor. After their topic is approved, students then move on to their learning activity. The Exhibit learning activity is entirely made up by the student, but for a student to earn credit, they must shadow/learn from a master of their chosen topic for at least 30 hours. After their learning activity is completed, each student then applies what they learned in the form of their application project. Once students complete all parts of the exhibit process, they present their project to their peers, teachers, and mentors in the Donald and Susan Reed Theater. If a topic does not allow for a final application (ex: Medical) students can substitute their final application for a second learning activity.

== Athletics ==
FA offers Athletics in three different levels:

- Varsity (8th grade-Upper School)
- Junior Varsity (Middle and Upper School)
- Middle School (Middle School)

Exceptions: Some Varsity sports allow 6th-12th Grade.

=== Sports offered ===
The following sports are offered to boys at Fredericksburg Academy:

Fall	Winter	Spring
Cross Country (V)	Basketball (MS, JV, V)	Lacrosse (MS, JV, V)
Soccer (MS, JV, V)	Swimming (V)	Tennis (MS, JV, V)

The following sports are offered to girls at Fredericksburg Academy:

Fall	Winter	Spring
Cross Country (V)	Basketball (MS, JV, V)	Lacrosse (MS, JV, V)
Field Hockey (MS, JV, V)	Swimming (V)	Soccer (MS, JV, V)
Tennis (MS, JV, V)		

=== State championships ===
- Field Hockey VISAA II (2002, 2008, 2012, 2013, 2014, 2015, 2021)
- Cross Country VISAA II individual, Raleigh Hazel (2008)

== Campus ==
Fredericksburg Academy is housed in three buildings consisting of approximately 175,000 sq ft of educational facilities. The campus has two education buildings and one athletics center.

=== The Hazel Family Arts and Sciences Building ===
The Hazel Family Arts and Sciences Building was designed in 2002 by design firm, Cooper Carry. Construction began in the early months of 2003 and was completed in April 2004. The building provides the campus with 4 Upper School Science Labs, 2 General Classrooms, 3 Art Studio Classrooms, a kiln room, The 413 Seat Donald and Susan Reed Theater, a theater control room, a black box theater, a band room, a chorus room, 2 instrument practice rooms, a 750 sqft fitness facility, the Upper School Commons, a lobby, Upper School administrative offices, and the Fredworks/FA Makerspace.

- Houses the majority of Upper School classes
- Houses the School's Upper School Maker Space which is sponsored by local engineering group, FredWorks

==== The Donald and Susan Reed Theater ====
- Located in The Hazel Family Arts and Sciences Building
- 413 Seat Theater
- Houses the School's 3 yearly musicals/plays, as well as Lower School Performances

=== The John and Virginia Hazel Sports Center ===
The John and Virginia Hazel Sports Center was built in 1998 and includes a gymnasium, aquatics center, training office, as well as locker rooms for the FA's and the surrounding communities athletics programs.

==== Gymnasium ====
- NCAA Regulation Sized
- Houses the 3 pep rallies held every year
- Home to the boys and girls basketball teams

==== Aquatics Center ====
- NCAA Regulation Sized
- 25 meters
- 8 Lanes
- Home to the Co-ed Varsity Swim Team, FAST (The Fredericksburg Academy Swim Team)
- Home to local club swim team, Tsunami Swimming

=== The Gladys T. Quarles Academy Building ===
In recognition of the significant role of the Quarles family and The Gladys T. Quarles Charitable Trust in the founding of Fredericksburg Academy, the Board of Trustees dedicated the Lower and Middle School facility as the Gladys T. Quarles Academy Building on December 19, 2007. The Gladys T. Quarels Lower and Middle School was acquired by the school in 1994, the building houses the Lower and Middle Schools. The facility supplies the Lower School with the lower school commons, a music room, a lower school STEM lab, The Constance Suzanne O'Connell Memorial Library and Computer Lab, the Lower School art room, classrooms for grades PK-5. The Building also provides the school with other facilities such as the Middle School Commons, The Middle School Multi-Purpose Room and lunch service facility, the Falcon's Nest (school store), 2 middle school science labs, the Middle School art room, the Middle School Library and Media Center, FA's IT Office, FA's Administrative Offices, a garden, as well as classrooms for grades 6-8 (as well as some Upper School Classes).

==== Lower School Natural Playscape ====
- Built in 2017
- Allows Lower School Science classes to be held outdoors
- The newest of FA's 3 Lower School playgrounds

==== Constance Suzanne O'Connell Memorial Library and Computer Lab ====
On November 3, 2000, the Constance Suzanne O'Connell Memorial Library and Computer Center was dedicated in memory of Fredericksburg Academy student Connie O'Connell. The Library and Computer Lab allows Lower School students the ability to learn from state-of-the-art All-in-one Computers and build on literary skills through the Lower School Library Program. FA maintains and is constantly growing a collection of books and literary materials. In addition to these resources, FA also subscribes to a number of online databases and e-libraries.

=== Athletic Complex ===
- FA's Athletic Complex is home to 3 Athletic Fields, 4 Tennis Courts, as well as the Campus's Cross Country Paths
- A pedestrian tunnel under Falcon Drive allows for members of the FA community to safely walk from the academic to the athletic divisions of the campus

=== Activities Field ===
- Directly across Academy Drive from The Hazel Family Arts and Sciences Building and The John and Virginia Hazel Sports center, lies the Activities field
- Serves as an overflow practice field for FA's athletic program
- (Weather Permitting) Allows for outdoor Physical Education classes
