= Axton, Virginia =

Unincorporated community in Virginia, United States

- Unincorporated community
- Location within Virginia Location within the United States
- Coordinates: 36°39′34″N 79°42′43″W
- Country: United States
- State: Virginia
- County: Henry
- Elevation: 1,007 ft (307 m)
- Time zone: UTC-5 (Eastern (EST))
  - Summer (DST): UTC-4 (EDT)
- ZIP code: 24054
- Area code: 276
- GNIS feature ID: 1498400

Axton is an unincorporated community in Henry County, Virginia, United States. Axton is located on U.S. Route 58, 9.2 miles (14.8 km) east-southeast of Martinsville. Axton has a post office with ZIP code 24054, which opened on July 17, 1882. Axton Elementary School and Carlisle School are located in Axton.

== Notable person ==
- J. C. Martin, baseball player who was a major league catcher for fourteen seasons
