= Wakefield Country Day School =

Wakefield Country Day School (WCDS)
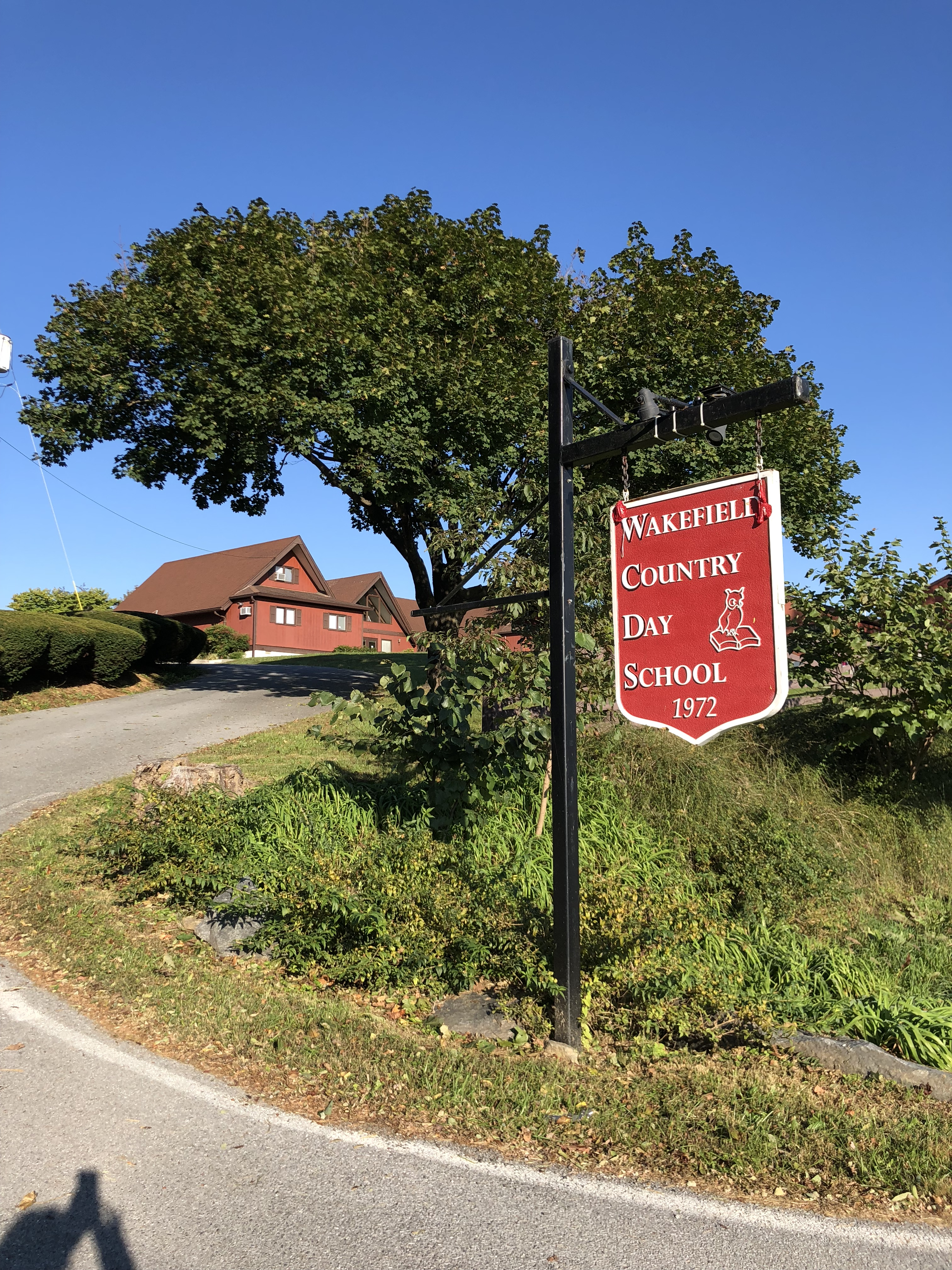
- Main Building from Entrance

Location
- 1059 Zachary Taylor Highway; Flint Hill, Virginia; United States; 38°47′34″N 78°6′18.7″W

Information
- Type: Independent, Private
- Motto: Virtus et Sapientia (Virtue and Wisdom)
- Established: 1972
- Founder: William & Pamela Lynn
- Status: Current, Operational
- Category: Independent School
- Chairman: Tom Griffin
- Principal: John Elmore
- Faculty: 33
- Teaching staff: 25
- Grades: Pre-school(age 3) to grade 12
- Gender: Co-educational
- Enrollment: 160
- Houses: Trinity Manor
- Colors: White and Red
- Athletics: Soccer, Volleyball, Cross Country, Basketball, Equestrian, Lacrosse
- Mascot: Owl
- Nickname: WCDS
- Accreditation: VISA
- Newspaper: The Huntly Herald
- Affiliation: VISA Virginia Independent School Association
- Website: www.wcdsva.org

Wakefield Country Day School is a co-educational, independent, non-sectarian elementary, middle, and high school situated in Rappahannock County, United States and serving grades preschool (age 3) through grade 12. The school's 12-acre (49,000 m^{2}) campus is located near the town of Flint Hill, about 90 minutes from Washington, DC. Founded and in continuous operation since 1972, the school is accredited with the Virginia Independent School Association and is part of the Virginia Independent Schools Athletic Association. The second largest private employer in Rappahannock, the school as of September 2023 had an enrollment of just under 200 students from Rappahannock county and nearby counties — Culpeper, Fauquier, Frederick, Madison, Page, Prince William, Shenandoah and Warren.

The school's educational philosophy places a focus on the study of humanities, especially English language and composition, History, Foreign Languages, and Classical Languages. The average class size is fewer than 15 students.

== History ==
In the early 1970s, newlywed teachers William and Pamela Lynn decided to established a school—the school that would become Wakefield Country Day School— because they wished to create a British-style private school that was affordable for the middle class. Using land owned by William Lynn's mother, they constructed a school building and opened enrollment for students in 1972. Philippe Cugnon, a Frenchman and college professor, was brought on to serve as the first headmaster. After a year, William took over. Both founders taught full-time at the school from its founding. William Lynn also wrote the first Word of the Day and Great 100 books and established traditions such as the annual competition between "Spartan" and "Athenian" athletic teams. William Lynn served as headmaster until his sudden death in 1988.

In 1991, while the school was under Allen Sounders's leadership, a significant portion of the school's administration, faculty, and students split away to reestablish the school as Wakefield School in Marshall, Virginia. Throughout this process, Wakefield Country Day School, at its original campus and under the leadership of founder Pamela Lynn, continued to operate. In the immediate aftermath of the split, WCDS saw a steep enrollment drop but the numbers grew substantially thereafter. In the decades since, both schools have continued to operate as separate entities. Wakefield School has tended to have more students, while the enrollment of WCDS has been lower, hovering around or below 200 students.

Serving a sparsely populated rural area, Wakefield Country Day School has prided itself on its small class sizes and indivdualized teaching approach, with average class sizes ranging between 10 and 16 students per grade.

The school received significant coverage in local news media in May 2019 in the announcement of a potential closure, especially the Rappahannock News. The school's entire board of directors resigned during the crisis, and a new board, with chairman Paul F. Larner, was installed. In 2020 Paul F. Larner became Head of School and has been instrumental in returning the school to a state of financial viability and sustainability.

Beginning in the 2024-25 school year, John Elmore assumed role of Head of School. As of 2026, Wakefield Country Day School currently maintains an enrollment of approximately 150 boarding and day students.

== School governance ==
The school is organized as a nonprofit corporation, with an elected board of directors.

== Academics ==
=== Core prep school curriculum ===
The Upper School, or core prep school, is a program of 28 credits molded in the classical tradition. The curriculum includes an emphasis on English, mathematics, history, and classical and modern foreign languages. An advanced classical diploma is available with 32 credits, including four additional credits in mathematics, science, and foreign languages. Some of the school's special graduation requirements include a senior course on finance, two years' study in both ancient and modern languages, and the research, writing, presentation and defense of a senior thesis. Students also have completed internships with local professionals as part of their graduation requirements.

Through the 10th grade students spend two class periods per day studying English literature, composition, vocabulary, and grammar.

=== College counseling ===
Students begin their college counseling process in their freshman year. Over the next four years, they meet with their advisor to discuss college choices, take the PSAT and ACT Aspire and any advanced placement tests that are appropriate, complete questionnaires, resumes, and self-assessments, write mock college essays, participate in mock interviews, and meet with college admission representatives who visit the campus. They are also encouraged to take part in extracurricular activities.

All students apply to at least two colleges or universities. 90 percent of them are accepted into the colleges and universities of their first choice. WCDS graduates as a group receive between one and two million dollars annually in merit scholarships.

=== International trips ===
International travel has been a longstanding component of Wakefield Country Day School's educational philosophy, with organized overseas trips dating back to the 1970s. The school has maintained a tradition of incorporating international travel into its curriculum, particularly in history, classical studies, and foreign-language education.

WCDS operates a series of faculty-led excursions for middle and upper school students. 7th and 8th students participate in a ten-day tour of England, complementing their study of British history through visits to historical landmarks and cultural sites. Upper school students undertake excursions focused on European history, classical antiquity, and the Renaissance, primarily visiting Italy, France, and Switzerland. In recent years, additional trips to Spain, Argentina, the Netherlands, and Hungary have taken place.

The upper school program has included a series of trips following the historical routes of ancient Rome, often described as Walking in the Footsteps of Caesar. In February 2020, a group of 24 students, teachers, and other participants traveled through northern Italy, southern France, and Switzerland, including a visit to CERN in Geneva.

The international travel program is supported by student fundraising activities intended to offset participation costs. The school strives to provide every student with an opportunity to travel abroad at least once before graduation, integrating these experiences with classroom instruction and its broader emphasis on foreign languages and international education.

== Funding and tuition ==
From May to November 2019, benefactors donated more than $2 million to the school for tuition assistance and to support ongoing operations. This included $1.2 million in scholarships to fund 25 students for three years.

From 2020 to 2024 the school received major gifts from two anonymous donors, and one from Tobias Dengel, WCDS 1989, President of WillowTree, and his wife, Lynn. These gits were given to support scholarships and teacher development.

According to the school, every family with demonstrated financial need is offered assistance via scholarships or financial aid, with most of them ultimately accepting it and enrolling their children, deeming the help sufficient to meet their needs. As of September 2022, 70 percent of WCDS students were receiving some form of financial assistance. However, the school notes, "no family at WCDS receives full tuition assistance. All families are expected to pay something toward their children's education".

== Traditions ==
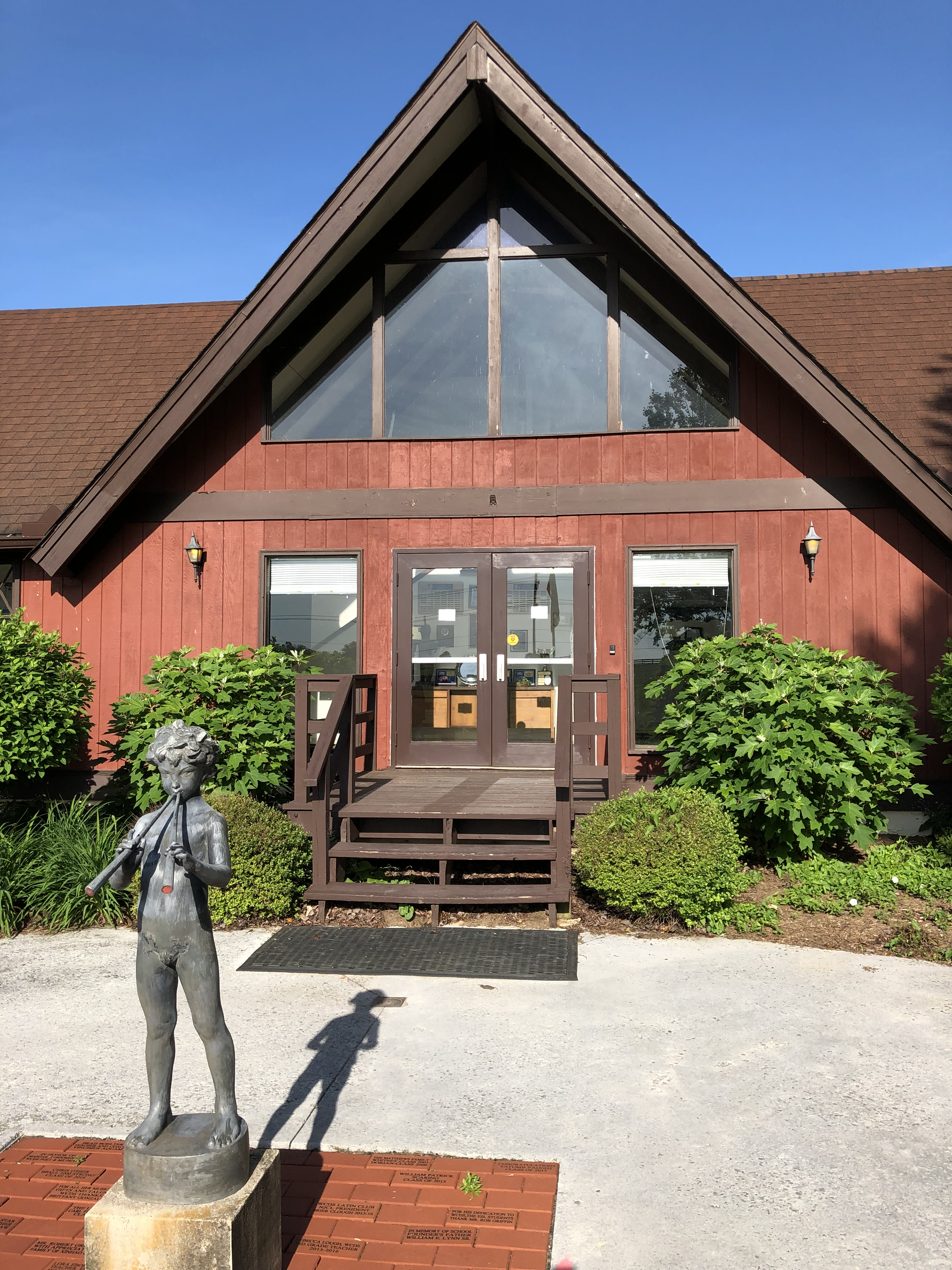
Facing the highway, this is the central facade of the historic building. It was constructed in 1972 from prefabricated A-Frames, chosen by the founders to give the school an architecture distinctly different from the public schools of the time.

WCDS traditions include the weekly assembly in which the Head of School makes announcements to the school body, the annual Spartans vs. Athenians competition, Certamen, the Latin convention, the Medieval Banquet, and National Parks Day. All 7th and 8th graders travel to England as an extension of their study of British history. High schoolers take a trip to Italy (for upper school classics) and sometimes Spain (for upper school language immersion).

Academic traditions include the Word of the Day in which students memorize vocabulary, and the Great 100, in which students memorize the biographies of 100 important historical figures. The school's colors are red and white; in the Spartans vs. Athenians competition, which is inspired by the Ancient Olympic Games and serves essentially as a field day, the students are divided into two teams, with the Spartans wearing red and the Athenians wearing white. First, each team assembles into a formation of parallel rows for inspection by the faculty for proper discipline and deportment. Then they participate in a series of competitions, such as Capture the Flag.

British traditions such as the use of elected prefects to enforce discipline are practiced, though only rarely. Prefects may be put in charge of overseeing their classes in the absence of the teacher, and together the prefects very rarely form a court to question students suspected of violating the academic honor code. Older students also mentor younger students through the Language Ambassador, Reading Buddy and Bus Buddy programs.

Students wear uniforms, including a dress uniform on Wednesdays, the day of the weekly assembly.

== Notable students ==
Notable students have included, for example, Leonard M. Cowherd III, who graduated from West Point, graduated third in his United States Army Armor School class at Fort Knox, and was commissioned as a U.S. Army second lieutenant. While stationed overseas in the Iraq War, he wrote a series of guest columns to the Culpeper Star-Exponent about his experiences and observations as a tank platoon leader. After exiting his tank to secure a building near Karbala's Mukhayam mosque, which had been the scene of intense fighting during a recent raid to oust the Mehdi Army insurgents who had been using the mosque as a base of operations, he received enemy sniper and rocket-propelled grenade fire and was killed. Subsequently, his story and correspondence were featured in the Bill Couturié documentary Last Letters Home. A scholarship was established in Cowherd's memory.

Another notable student was Jacob G. Foster, who placed number one in the world on advanced placement tests in French literature, calculus, modern European history, biology, Latin, physics, and other subjects; scored a perfect 1600 on the Scholastic Aptitude Test; and became a Rhodes scholar and later a mathematical physicist and sociologist.

Tobias Dengel, WCDS 1989, holds a BSE in Finance (Wharton) and a BSE in Systems Engineering, both from the University of Pennsylvania. He and his wife Lynn are major benefactors of the school. He founded WillowTree, Inc., which merged with a Canadian public company named TELUS International in 2023. He also serves as the Chair of the Thomas Jefferson Foundation Board, which manages Monticello in Charlottesville, as well as on the Board of WillowTree.
