= Wakefield School =

Location
- 4439 Old Tavern Road; The Plains, Virginia 20198; 38.8556575°N 77.7777311°W

Information
- Funding type: Private
- Founded: 1972
- Head of school: Ashley Harper
- Grades: JK–12
- Enrollment: 332
- Colors: Red and White
- Mascot: The Fighting Owls
- Rivals: Highland School, Wakefield Country Day School
- Website: www.wakefieldschool.org

Wakefield School is an independent day school located in The Plains, Virginia, with classes ranging from junior kindergarten to 12th grade. It was founded in Huntly, Virginia in 1972 as Wakefield Country Day School, and changed its name to Wakefield School in the early 1980s when it established a small boarding department (boarding was discontinued after a few years).

After a disagreement with the founders of the school, half of the board of trustees moved the school from the Huntly location and re-founded the school at Marshall, Virginia in 1991, and moved later to Archwood Farm in The Plains (the first campus owned by the board of trustees) in 1996. However, the original campus, headed by the original founders, continues to operate as a separate school, Wakefield Country Day School. Between 1996 and today, Wakefield grew from a school of 240 students to the current enrollment of about 332 as the campus was developed.

Wakefield School was first accredited by the Virginia Association of Independent Schools in 2001. It counts among its graduates more than 800 alumni: 1980-1991 from the Huntly campus, 1992-1996 from the Marshall campus, and 1997-the present from The Plains campus. Significant alums include reddit and Hipmunk cofounder Steven Huffman and David Metcalf, the United States Attorney for the Eastern District of Pennsylvania.

Wakefield is a member of the Greater Piedmont Athletic Conference (GPAC).
