= Randolph-Macon Academy =

Boarding school in Virginia, U.S.

Coordinates: 38°55′23″N 78°11′54″W

Randolph Macon Academy
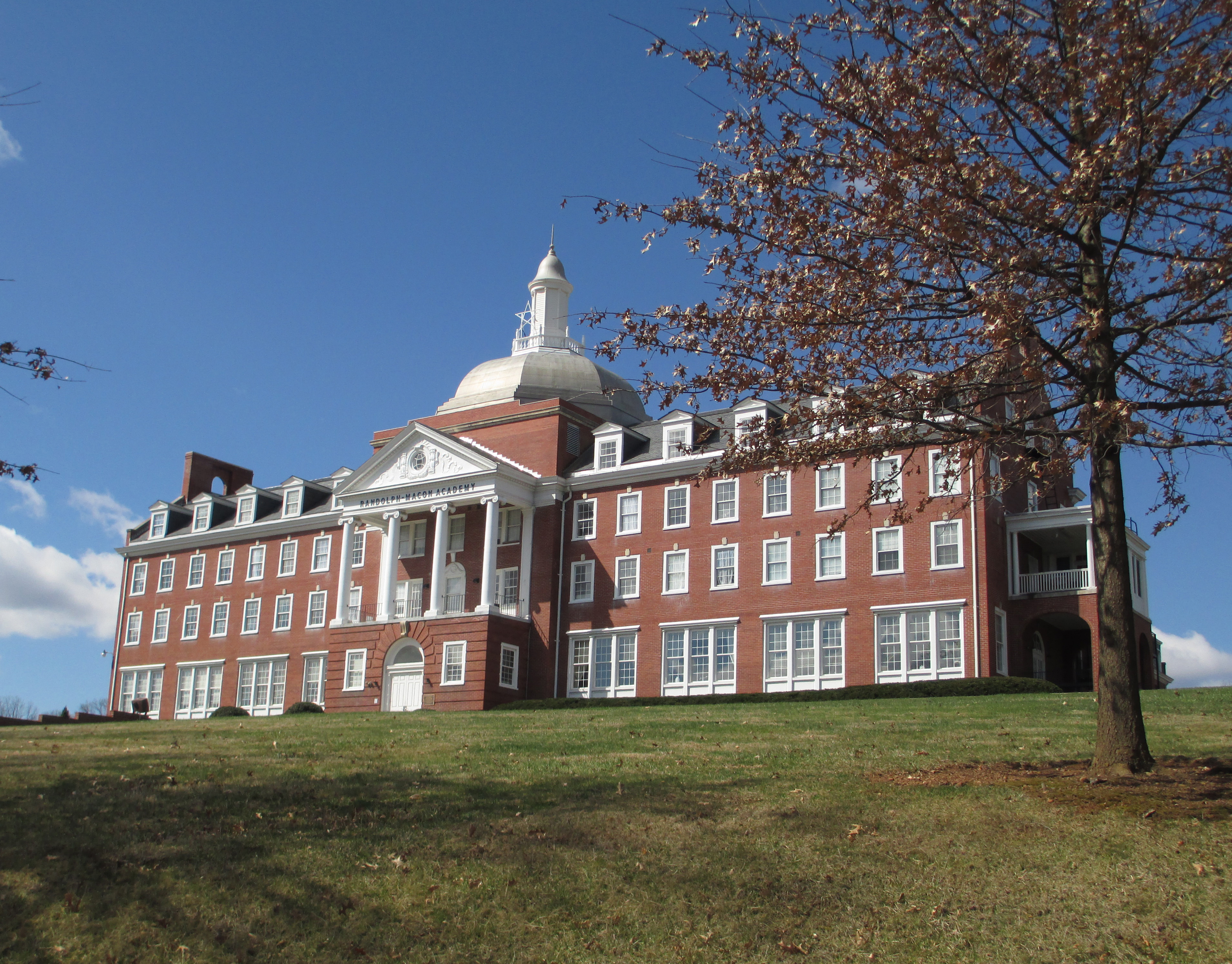
- Sonner-Payne Hall at Randolph-Macon Academy in March of 2015.

Location
- 200 Academy Drive; Front Royal, Virginia 22630; United States

Information
- Type: Private (Boarding)
- Founded: 1892
- President: Brig. Gen. David C. Wesley, USAF Ret.
- Grades: 8 - 12
- Mascot: Yellow Jacket
- Programs: College-Prep and Advanced Placement; Flight; Drama; Art; Band; Chorus; CyberPatriot; Middle School, JV, & Varsity Sports; Art Club; Model UN; Interact Clubs at Middle School and Upper School
- Website: rma.edu

Randolph-Macon Academy (R-MA) is a coeducational private boarding school in the U.S. state of Virginia with a military leadership component. R-MA serves students in grades 8-12.

The 135-acre (0.55 km2) campus overlooks Front Royal, and is 70 miles (110 km) west of Washington, D.C. It is one of six private military schools in Virginia.

== Accreditation and Programs ==
Randolph-Macon Academy is accredited by the Virginia Association of Independent Schools. As of 2023, they no longer offer any AFJROTC program at the Academy.

=== Academic programs ===
Randolph-Macon Academy offers the following programs:

==== Advanced Placement (AP) ====
R-MA offers Advanced Placement programs in the following subject areas:

English	Visual Arts	Math	Science	Social Studies
AP English Language and Composition	AP Drawing	AP Statistics	AP Biology	AP US History
AP English Literature and Composition	AP 2-D Art and Design	AP Calculus AB	AP Chemistry	AP Psychology
	AP 3-D Art and Design	AP Calculus BC	AP Environmental Science	
			AP Physics C: Mechanics	

==== Dual Enrollment Courses (D.E.) ====
R-MA offers Dual Enrollment Courses with Laurel Ridge Community College and Shenandoah University.

==== Career and Transition Services ====
English for Speakers of Other Languages (ESOL)

== History ==
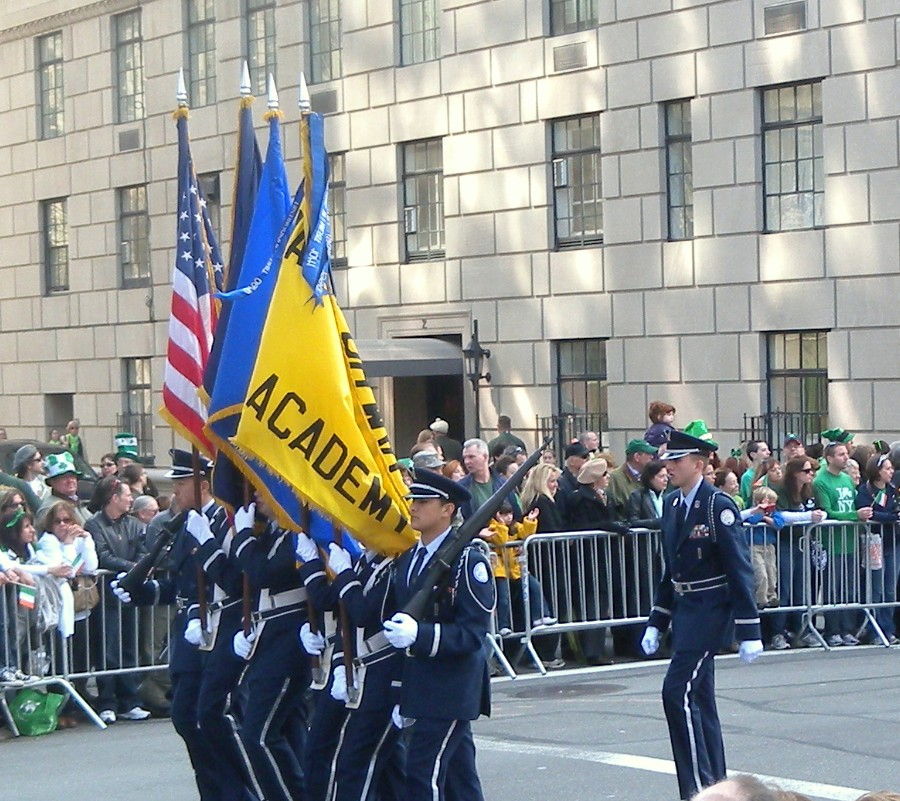
Randolph-Macon Academy Color Guard in New York.

Randolph-Macon Academy was founded in 1892 by Dr. William W. Smith as part of the Randolph-Macon College preparatory school program. The original 15-acre (0.061 km^{2}) campus had one main building which housed classrooms as well as dormitories. The original building resembled a castle in its design and architecture.

In 1917 it transformed into a military school. The program later undertook the title of the "National Defense Cadet Corps."

After a fire, the new "Main Building" was built in 1927; it was listed on the National Register of Historic Places in 1987 as Sonner Hall.

Randolph-Macon Academy admitted its first African American applicant in 1971. In 1974 it became coeducational and in 1975 adopted the United States Air Force Junior ROTC program. In 1980, it adopted its first flight program.

In 1981, Col. Trevor D. Turner (USA, Ret.) was hired as President (1981-1997). During his 16-year term, he renewed the 118-year-old Academy's stature from being on the brink of closure to one of the country's prominent college preparatory schools. This included expanding the Academy's campus, founding and building an adjacent middle school, modernizing and renovating the existing facilities, including the historic Sonner Hall, and constructing several new buildings: Crow Hall, a math and science building; Fulton Fine Arts and Maintenance Complex; and a girl's dormitory and dining hall now known as Turner Hall in his honor. Col. Turner's period in charge also coincided with a financial crisis due to a fire, which was successfully overcome by the time he left in 1997.

In June 2023, Brigadier General David Wesley announced that Randolph-Macon Academy would no longer have an AFJROTC program, and would instead be developing its own military leadership program. The replacement, the Cadet Leadership Development Program, focuses on positive character development with military undertones.

In February 2025, Brigadier General David Wesley announced that the Randolph-Macon Academy middle school campus would be shut down during the 2025-2026 year, moving the 8th grade onto the High School campus during the transition.

== Notable alumni ==
- General Walter E. Boomer, USMC, Retired
- Major General William H. Gill, USA, Retired
- Harlan Crow, real estate developer
- Joel Shankle, 1956 Summer Olympics Bronze Medalist in the 110 Hurdles
- VADM John Stufflebeem, USN, Retired
