= VHSL Group 5A North Region =

The Group 5A North Region is a division of the Virginia High School League. The region was formed in 2013 when the VHSL adopted a six classification format and eliminated the previous three classification system. For the purpose of regular season competition, schools compete within districts that existed prior to 2013, while post-season competition will be organized within four conferences that make up each region. It is a successor to the AAA Northern Region.

== Conferences for 2013–14 and 2014–15 ==
=== Capitol Conference 13 ===
- Thomas Jefferson High School
- George C. Marshall High School
- Thomas A. Edison High School
- Falls Church High School
- Mount Vernon High School (Will move to 6A, Conference 7 in 2015–2016)
- J.E.B. Stuart High School
- Wakefield High School
- Lee High School

=== Conference 14 ===
- Freedom-South Riding High School (Will move to 4A, Conference 22 in 2015–2016)
- Stone Bridge High School
- Briar Woods High School
- Broad Run High School
- Potomac Falls High School
- Tuscarora High School

=== Conference 15 ===
- Freedom-Woodbridge High School (Will move to 6A, Conference 4 in 2015–2016)
- Potomac High School
- North Stafford High School
- Brooke Point High School
- Massaponax High School
- Mountain View High School

=== Conference 16 ===
- Albemarle High School
- Patrick Henry-Ashland High School
- Orange County High School
- Halifax High School
