= Massaponax, Virginia =

- Unincorporated area
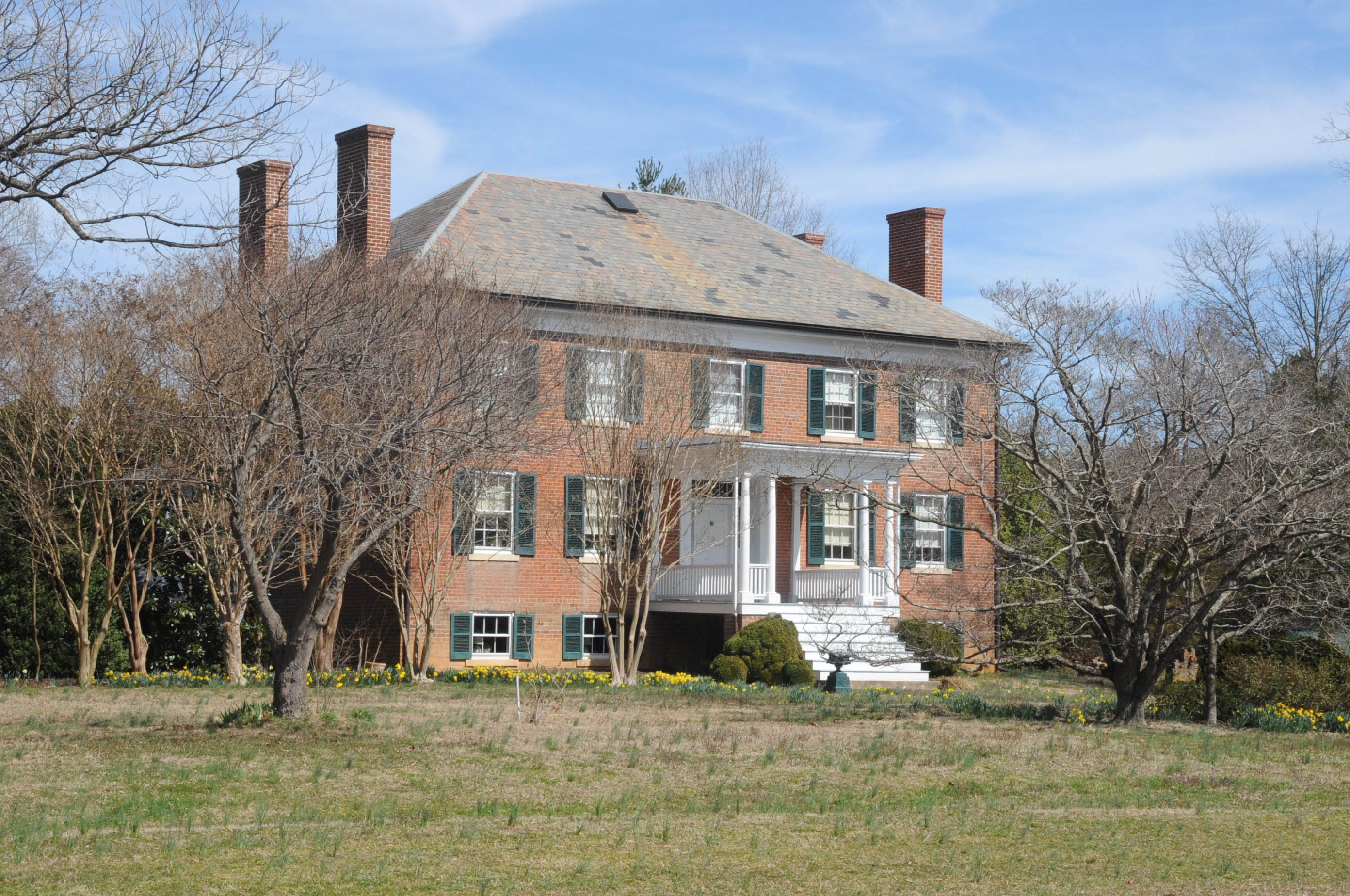
- Stirling plantation in Massaponax

- Location within Northern Virginia Location within Virginia Location within the United States
- Coordinates: 38°11′35.9″N 77°30′33.2″W
- Country: United States
- State: Virginia
- County: Spotsylvania
- Time zone: UTC−5 (Eastern (EST))
  - Summer (DST): UTC−4 (EDT)

Massaponax is an unincorporated community of Spotsylvania County, Virginia, United States. The name Massaponax comes from a native American village that existed before and during the early colonization of Virginia. It means "corn as tall as man".

== Geography ==
Massaponax is located just east of Spotsylvania Courthouse and approximately 4.5 miles south of the Four Mile Fork area.

Massaponax Creek is a stream located 4.8 miles from Fredericksburg Virginia. It is located near Ruffins Pond and runs almost parallel west to east below Fredericksburg.

Massaponax Creek is a popular local spot for fishing. The most popular species caught here are Largemouth bass, Blue catfish, and Snakehead.

Massaponax Creek Trail is a 1.6 mile trail located in Loriella Park.

Ni River Trail is located across the street from Massaponax High School. It features a pond and nature walking trails and is a great location to view wildlife.

== Demographics ==
Massaponax is a suburban community (based on population density) located in Fredericksburg, Virginia. Neighborhoods in Massaponax include Lee's Park, South Oaks, Lancaster Gate, Fox Point, Timberlake, and others.

Massaponax is considered to be a very diverse community. 56% of students at Massaponax High School are Black, Latino, Native American, or Asian.

It is the site of historic Massaponax Baptist Church.

== Education ==
Riverview Elementary School

Parkside Elementary School

Massaponax High School is a public school. It is part of Spotsylvania County Public Schools and is located on 8201 Jefferson Davis Highway.

Massaponax High School opened in the fall of 1998 becoming the fourth high school in Spotsylvania County.

Massaponax is one of the county's largest high schools and carries a current enrollment of 1,960 students in grades 9 through 12. The school complex consists of 106 acres (0.43 km^{2}).

Massaponax High School is part of the AAA Commonwealth District and AAA Northwest Region, and offers soccer, tennis, cheerleading, cross country, lacrosse, football, golf, volleyball, basketball, field hockey, swimming, wrestling, baseball, softball, track and field, and gymnastics .

Massaponax's football team reached the State Finals in 2003 following an undefeated season, but lost.[1]

Nearby Massaponax is Germanna Community College which is one of the twenty-three community colleges in Virginia that comprise the Virginia Community College System. The college serves the residents of Caroline, Culpeper, King George, Madison, Orange, Spotsylvania, and Stafford counties and the City of Fredericksburg. The Fredericksburg Area Campus is located near Cosner's Corner Shopping Center which is in Massaponax.
