= Colonial Forge High School =

Colonial Forge Middle School

Location
- 550 Courthouse Road; Stafford, Virginia 22554; United States; 38°26′6″N 77°27′5″W

Information
- Type: Public High School
- Established: 1999
- School district: Stafford County Public Schools
- Superintendent: Dr. Daniel W. Smith
- Principal: Teri Hampton
- Staff: 123.75 (FTE)
- Grades: 9-12
- Enrollment: 1,996 (2021-22)
- Student to teacher ratio: 16.99
- Colors: Navy Blue; Forest Green; White
- Fight song: Colonial Forge Fight Song, based on "The Harmonious Blacksmith"
- Athletics conference: Virginia High School League; AAA Northwest Region; AAA Commonwealth District
- Nickname: Eagles
- Rival: Stafford Senior High School; North Stafford High School Mountain View High School; Brooke Point High School Hartwood High School
- Publication: Molten Art
- Newspaper: Talon
- Yearbook: Apollo
- Feeder schools: Rodney E. Thompson Middle School (Majority); H.H. Poole Middle School (Minority); T. Benton Gayle Middle School (Majority); A.G. Wright Middle School (Minority); Stafford Middle School (Minority); Edward E. Drew Jr., Middle School (Minority)
- Website: cfhs.org

Colonial Forge High School is a public high school in Stafford, Virginia serving students in grades nine through twelve in the central portion of Stafford County, Virginia.

== Location and demographics ==
Colonial Forge is located on Courthouse Road, State Route 630, slightly over two miles from Interstate 95 and U.S. Route 1. Colonial Forge's student enrollment is now 38.3% White, 27.1% Black, 17.9% Hispanic, 9.4% Two or More Races, 6.7% Asian, 0.4% American Indian/Alaskan Native, and 0.3% Native Hawaiian/Pacific Islander.

== History ==
Colonial Forge was completed in 1999 as the fourth high school to open in Stafford County. The school's colors are navy blue, forest green, and silver and the mascot is the Bald Eagle.

A historical marker denoting the Accokeek Furnace Archeological Site is located on the school grounds.

In 2011, a 14-year old student of the school dressed up in a banana costume and ran across the football field in a banana costume. He was suspended for two weeks, sparking outcry, a viral video, and an interview from NBC4 reporter Pat Collins. The boy's suspension was lifted after five days and the principal of the high school resigned a week later.

== Academics and extracurricular activities ==
Molten Art, Colonial Forge's literary magazine, has won several Crown Awards in Columbia University's CSPA Crown competition, including a Silver Crown in 2004, and Gold Crowns in 2006 and 2008. Molten Art consistently earns high national praise, often competing against private schools that specialize in the arts.

== Athletics ==
Colonial Forge's athletic teams compete in the AAA Northwest Region.

The Colonial Forge wrestling team has claimed four AAA VA State Championships in wrestling back-to-back-to-back in 2007-08-09, and again in 2012. They also won a 6A State Title in 2015, 2016, and 2017.

In 2014, the Colonial Forge boys' basketball team became the first high school basketball team from Stafford County to win the State Championship. They repeated as state champions in 2015.

In 2017, the Colonial Forge girls' basketball team became the first high school basketball team from Stafford County to win the VHSL 6A Women's Tournament. They beat the Oakton Cougars by a score of 52-38 in the title game held on March, 11.

== Notable alumni ==
- Gary Jennings Jr., NFL player
- Tim Scott, former NFL player
- Aleyse Shannon, actress
- Clara Schilke, former NCAA soccer player
- Randy Hippeard, NAL player
- Elijah Sarratt, NFL player
