= Commonwealth Governor's School =

Coordinates: 38.2951°N 77.5755°W

- United States

Information
- Type: Magnet high school
- Established: 1998
- Director: Tracie Omohundro
- Grades: 9 to 12
- Enrollment: 597 (as of 2022-2023)
- Website: cgsva.org

The Commonwealth Governor's School (CGS) is one of 18 magnet Governor's Schools in Virginia. The Commonwealth Governor's School is a half-day program for gifted and highly motivated students based on a school-within-a-school model. Unlike many school programs, CGS is merit based (getting in to the program is based on a list of things, each with a certain number of points assigned) . Students are selected from Stafford, Spotsylvania, Caroline, and King George counties. Students may attend CGS in grades 9 through 12.

== Program structure ==
Enrolled students take all of their classes at one of the six Governor's School sites, Spotsylvania High School, Riverbend High School, Colonial Forge High School, Stafford Senior High School, King George High School, or North Stafford High School. CGS assigns students to the nearest site distance wise, unlike the traditional zoning system. It no longer matters if a student is zoned for a different high school, they go to the one CGS decides full-time.

Unlike the traditional high school experience, CGS's classes are linked together for a stronger curriculum. For example, if class A assigns a time-consuming project as homework, class B, C, and D will lower the homework load for the time the project takes.

== Curriculum ==
The table listed below lists all CGS classes, note that while math option 2 is called option 2, it becomes a student decision only in 12th grade.

Class structure
	History	Math	Math (option 2)	English	Science
9th	AP European History	Honors Algebra II	N/A	Honors English 9	AP Environmental Science
10th	AP US Government	AP Precalculus	Honors Geometry with Trigonometry	Honors English 10	AP Biology
11th	AP US History	AP Calculus AB	AP Precalculus	AP English Language and Composition	Dual Enrollment Chemistry
12th	AP Human Geography	AP Calculus BC	AP Statistics	AP English Literature and Composition	AP Physics

=== The Culminating Project ===
"Culminating" is a two phase, two year long research project, repeated twice over a students CGS career. The first phase, or the research phase, occurs in 9th and 11th grade (freshman and junior years). This phase requires the student to find sources, evaluate them, and arrange them in a final literature review (typically a 20+ page report summarizing all sources found during the research process). The second phase is the product phase (sophomore and senior years), where the researcher/student integrates the knowledge they learned from their research the previous year to create a project that solves a current problem or displays the depth of their research in full. Students are aided by assigned "advisors", consisting of CGS site faculty, each year.

== History ==
Sylvia Wadsworth was the first director of the Commonwealth Governor's School, retiring in 2005. Dr. David Baker took over the post after her departure. On May 19, 2010, Merri Kae VanderPloeg was named the new director until the 2018–2019 school year, where Jennifer Grigsby became the new director. In 2024 Tracie Omohundro was appointed director, beginning July 1, 2024.
