= Commonwealth District (VHSL) =

The AAA Commonwealth District is a high school conference in the state of Virginia that includes schools from Stafford and Spotsylvania counties. AAA is the largest enrollment class of the Virginia High School League and also typically the most competitive level in Virginia high school sports.

The Commonwealth District schools competed in the AAA Northwest Region with the schools from the AAA Cardinal District, the AAA Cedar Run District, and the AAA Western Valley District until the 2013 VHSL District Reclassification.

== Facts about the district ==
The Commonwealth District has consistently had the base of its schools from Stafford County, as well as the larger schools in Spotsylvania County. In past years, the geographic area of the district was based primarily in Prince William County until the creation of the Cardinal District. It also at times included schools as far north and west as Winchester and Warrenton, and as south and west to include Albemarle High School of Charlottesville who had been a member since 2001.

The Commonwealth District has been a consistent force in AAA Division 5 Football, sending four different teams to the state championship from 1999 to 2004 (Culpeper, Stafford, Massaponax and North Stafford). As a member of the Commonwealth District in 1987, Courtland won a state championship in AAA Division 5 Football. The district has also won two state championships in Field Hockey (Stafford, 2005; North Stafford 1988), three in Cross Country (Stafford, 1996, 2011; Mountain View 2009), four in Girls Gymnastics (North Stafford, 1988–1991), one in Softball (Stafford, 1982), three in Wrestling (Colonial Forge, 2007–2009), one in volleyball (Albemarle, 2008) one in boys indoor track (Albemarle, 2009), one in Outdoor Track and Field (Stafford, 1968), two in boys soccer (North Stafford, 2011; Albemarle, 2012) and three in cheerleading (North Stafford, 1999, 2001, 2004)

== Member schools ==
As of 2026, the seven schools in the district are:

- Brooke Point High School of Stafford, Virginia
- Colonial Forge High School of Stafford, Virginia
- Massaponax High School of Spotsylvania, Virginia
- Mountain View High School of Stafford, Virginia
- North Stafford High School of Stafford, Virginia
- Riverbend High School of Spotsylvania, Virginia
- Stafford Senior High School of Falmouth, Virginia

== Former members ==
- Albemarle High School of Charlottesville, Virginia (2001–2013)
- Chancellor High School of Spotsylvania, Virginia (1996–1999)
- Courtland High School of Spotsylvania, Virginia (1986-1988, 1996–1999)
- Culpeper County High School of Culpeper, Virginia (1999-2001)
- Fauquier of Fauquier, Virginia (1998-2001)
- Freedom of Woodbridge, Virginia (2013-2016)
- Liberty of Bealeton, Virginia (1999-2001)
- Orange County High School of Orange, Virginia (2010–2013)
- Potomac of Dumfries, Virginia (1980-1999, 2013-2019)
