= McDougle =

McDougle is a surname. Notable people with the surname include:

- Dexter McDougle (born 1991), American football player
- Jerome McDougle (born 1978), American football defensive end
- Ryan McDougle (born 1971), American politician
- Stockar McDougle (born 1977), American football offensive lineman
