= Bryan Hudson =

Bryan Hudson may refer to:

- Bryan Hudson (baseball) (born 1997), American baseball pitcher
- Bryan Hudson (American football) (born 2001), American football center
- Brian Hudson (born 1991), American football quarterback
