= Wayne Elsey =

American entrepreneur, philanthropist, social activist

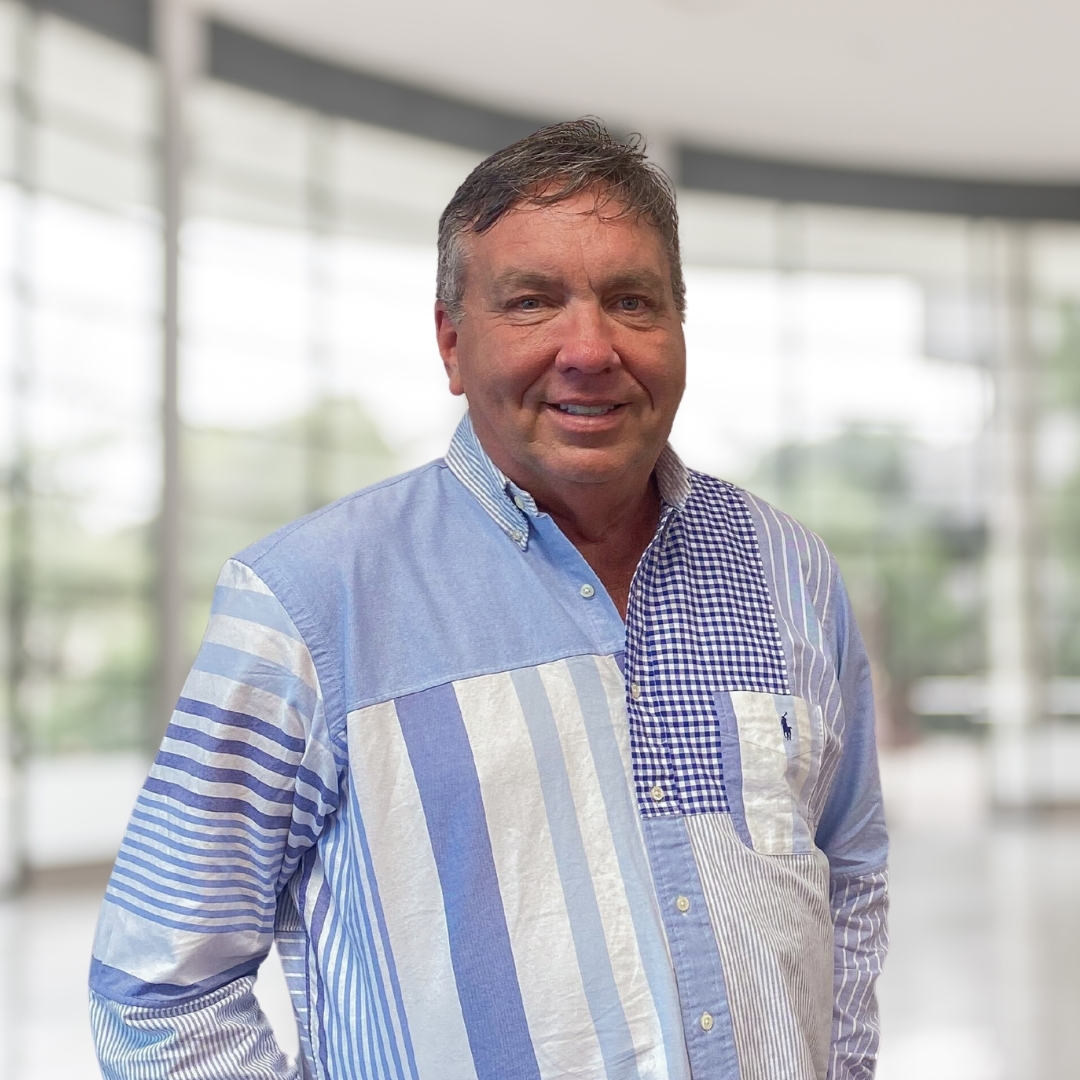
- Born: Arlington, Virginia
- Occupation: CEO of Elsey Enterprises
- Known for: Soles4Souls
- Website: wayneelsey.com

Wayne Elsey is an American entrepreneur, philanthropist, social activist and author. He is the founder and former CEO of Soles4Souls, a Nashville-based nonprofit organization that collects shoes from footwear companies and shoe drives.

== Career ==
Elsey began working in the shoe industry as a teenager, initially at a local branch of GallenKamp Shoes in Fredericksburg, Virginia. Not long after graduating from Stafford Senior High School in 1983, he started working for Stride Rite, and where he became a regional vice president at the age of 25.

From 1999 to 2004, Elsey was the president and CEO of Footwear Specialties International. Later, he managed growth and development in the occupational footwear market with Nautilus, Skidbuster, Third Watch, and Avenger. He also worked at EJ Footwear LLC (formerly known as the Endicott Johnson Corporation), Iron Age and Lake of the Woods. In 2000, Elsey was promoted to CEO/president of Nautilus Footwear. In March 2005, Elsey was named President of Kodiak-Terra USA Inc. He left Kodiak-Terra in April 2007 to work full time on Soles4Souls. As of 2007, Soles4Souls gave away around 2.5 million pairs of shoes distributed through 35 countries.

In March 2012, Elsey stepped down from his position at Soles4Souls and established Elsey Enterprises, a branding and marketing firm based in Orlando, Florida. In 2013, he founded Funds2Orgs, a social enterprise for helping nonprofit organizations raise funds.

Elsey is a regular contributor to Forbes Magazine, where his articles cover topics relevant to business.

== Business career ==
=== Soles4Souls ===
In 2004, Elsey founded Soles4Souls, a nonprofit organization that sends shoes to recovering communities struck by natural disasters. Soles4Souls became one of the USA's fastest growing charities, but faced criticism over claims that a $1 donation would provide a pair of shoes to someone in need, since the used shoes they received were resold to wholesalers that then sold them to small businesses in developing countries instead of directly shipping them abroad. One shoe company donated new shoes but the charity resold them and they ended up sold in discount stores in the USA. In 2010, Elsey expanded Soles4Souls to Clothes4Souls and in 2011, he added Hope4Souls.

In 2009, the Soles4Souls' board allowed Elsey to take a series of $900,000 loans from the Changing the World Foundation, a sister charity to Soles4Souls, and refinance his Florida condos, which was ruled illegal under Tennessee law. Elsey later repaid the money in full and refuted that he had mismanaged the funds, saying that he was safeguarding the funds during the economic downturn. After leaving Soles4Souls, he started Elsey Enterprises, a branding and marketing company. In 2010, Elsey published his book Almost Isn’t Good Enough about his experience with nonprofit organizations.

=== Funds2Orgs ===
Funds2Orgs collaborates with partner organizations to collect gently worn, used, and new shoes, which are then shipped to micro-entrepreneurs in countries such as Haiti, Guatemala, and Cambodia. These individuals sell the shoes at affordable prices as a means of establishing and sustaining microbusinesses. Partner organizations are compensated by Funds2Orgs based on the weight of the shoes collected, typically receiving between $0.40 - $0.50 per lb.

Elsey founded Funds2Orgs in 2013. In December 2015, Elsey Enterprises acquired Shoes With Heart, a shoe drive fundraising business based in Southern California, In 2016, Funds2Orgs launched Sneakers4Funds, a subsidiary that targets schools, parent-teacher associations, and sports teams to collect gently worn and new athletic shoes for fundraising campaigns.

In March 2018, Funds2Orgs acquired the Cash4Shooz shoe drive fundraiser for an undisclosed amount. Following the acquisition, all donated shoes associated with Cash4Shooz were redistributed through the Funds2Orgs network. Funds2Orgs later rebranded its subsidiary, Sneakers4Funds, as Sneakers4Good, an initiative focused on collecting shoes and distributing them to individuals in developing countries to support local economies through the reuse economy and the development of microenterprises.

Funds2Orgs collaborated with several nonprofits, schools, and businesses to organize shoe-drive fundraisers, including Green Bay Press-Gazette, Oconomowoc High School, Lakewood High School, League Education and Treatment Center, the East Clinton Band Boosters, Pennsylvania's Beth El Congregation, Boston Marathon, Congregation Shir Tikvah, Great River Rescue, Monastery of Christ the King and West Rowan Elementary.

== Publications ==
- Elsey, Wayne (2023). The Reuse Economy: How to Break Free from Our Throwaway Culture. ISBN 978-1642257403.
- Osbon, Shell (2022-06-17). It's Not Good for Leaders to Lead Alone!. Righteous Pen Publications. ISBN 978-1-940197-69-2.
- Donnellan, Marilyn L.; Condon, David; Elsey, Wayne; Gilliam, Andy (2019). Ten Keys to Effective Leadership: A Guidebook for Women of Faith. ISBN 978-1072069768.
- Elsey, Wayne (2019-12-30). The Traveling Shoes. WEE. ISBN 978-0-578-61659-9.
- Pitts, Melissa Elsey; Elsey, Wayne (2019-06-27). Tied Together. Amazon Digital Services LLC - KDP Print US. ISBN 978-0-578-48629-1.
- Elsey, Wayne (2016). Almost isn't good enough : the human connection changes everything.
- Elsey, Wayne; Spence, Linda N.; Reichartz, Carrie (2016-02-02). How to Dominate Your Fundraising to Create Your Success (Not Your Father's Charity Book Series). ISBN 978-0692628683.
- Elsey, Wayne (2016-04-28). Dominate in Your School Fundraising For Success, As Easy As ABC (Not Your Father's Charity Book Series). ISBN 978-0692699355.
- Elsey, Wayne (2015-08-06). Be Bold, Dominate and Succeed in Marketing For Today's Digital World On A Limited Budget (Not Your Father's Charity Book Series). ISBN 978-0578167824.
- Elsey, Wayne (2015-11-24). Grip & Rip Leadership for Social Impact (Not Your Father's Charity Book Series). ISBN 978-0578173474.
- Elsey, Wayne (2015). The Rise and Fail of Charities in the 21st Century: How the Nonprofit World is Changing and What You Can Do To Be Ready. ISBN 978-0578159218.
- Elsey, Wayne; Newton, Todd (2015). Get Off the Couch: Grip & Rip and Break the Barriers Holding You Back in Life. ISBN 978-0578169101.
- Elsey, Wayne (2015). The Rise and Fail of Charities and what You Can Do to be Ready. ISBN 978-0-578-16754-1.
- Elsey, Wayne (2006). "Puncture-resistant footwear: arch nemesis of the rusty nail". Occupational Health & Safety (Waco, Tex.). 75 (7): 58, 60, 62. ISSN 0362-4064. PMID 16903175.
- Elsey, Wayne (2003). "Good foot protection revolves around common sense". Occupational Health & Safety (Waco, Tex.). 72 (9): 68–70, 72, 74, 76. ISSN 0362-4064. PMID 14528821.
- Elsey, Wayne (2002). "Using your brain to become ergonomic-minded". Occupational Health & Safety (Waco, Tex.). 71 (4): 92. ISSN 0362-4064. PMID 11977570.
