= Stafford County Public Schools =

School district in Virginia, United States

Address
- 31 Stafford Ave Stafford County, Virginia, 22554; United States

District information
- Type: Public
- Grades: Pre-K–12
- Superintendent: Daniel W. Smith, Ed.D.
- NCES District ID: 5103660
- Enrollment: 31,812 (2024-2025)

Other information
- Website: www.staffordschools.net

Stafford County Public Schools is a Virginia school division that serves the Stafford County Area. Its current superintendent is Daniel W. Smith, Ed.D., and has 32,185 students currently enrolled in its 19 elementary schools, 8 middle schools and 6 high schools. Falls Run Elementary School, Crow's Nest Elementary School, and Hartwood High School will open in August 2026.

The district serves most of the county. However places on Marine Corps Base Quantico are zoned to Department of Defense Education Activity (DoDEA) schools,

== Schools ==
=== Elementary schools ===
Kate Waller Barrett Elementary School

Margaret Brent Elementary School

Anthony Burns Elementary School

Conway Elementary School

Crow’s Nest Elementary School

Falls Run Elementary School

Falmouth Elementary School

Ferry Farm Elementary School

Garrisonville Elementary School

Grafton Village Elementary School

Hampton Oaks Elementary School

Hartwood Elementary School

Anne E. Moncure Elementary School

Park Ridge Elementary School

Rockhill Elementary School

Rocky Run Elementary School

Stafford Elementary School

Widewater Elementary School

Winding Creek Elementary School

=== Middle schools ===
Dixon-Smith Middle School

- Fredericksburg, Virginia
- Principal: Andrew Bathke
- Mascot: Bulldogs
- Named after Donald B. Dixon and Lyle R. Smith

Edward E. Drew Middle School

- Falmouth, Virginia
- Principal: Amy Ivory
- Mascot: Rams
- Named after Assistant Principal Edward E. Drew Jr.

T. Benton Gayle Middle School

- Fredericksburg, Virginia
- Principal: Deanna Fierro-Kin
- Mascot: Panthers
- Named after Superintendent T. Benton Gayle

Shirley C. Heim Middle School

- Stafford, Virginia
- Principal: Matthew Hills
- Mascot: Timberwolves
- Named after Assistant Superintendent for Finance and Technology for Stafford County Public Schools Shirley C. Heim

H. H. Poole Middle School

- Stafford, Virginia
- Principal: Moneka Coats
- Mascot: Mustangs
- Named after educator Henry Harrison Poole

Stafford Middle School

- Stafford, Virginia
- Principal: Andrew Grider
- Mascot: Spartans

Rodney E. Thompson Middle School

- Stafford, Virginia
- Principal: Mike Archambault
- Mascot: Jaguars
- Named after educator Rodney E. Thompson

Andrew G. Wright Middle School

- Stafford, Virginia
- Principal: Carly Hegna
- Mascot: Tigers
- Named after Stafford County Public School Superintendent Andrew Graham Wright

=== High schools ===
Brooke Point High School

- Stafford, Virginia
- Principal: Joe Murgo
- Mascot: Blackhawks

Colonial Forge High School

- Stafford, Virginia
- Principal: Teri Hampton
- Mascot: Eagles

Hartwood High School

- Fredericksburg, Virginia
- Principal: Michael Kelly
- Mascot: Stallions

Mountain View High School

- Stafford, Virginia
- Principal: Stefanie Sullivan
- Mascot: Wildcats

North Stafford High School

- Stafford, Virginia
- Principal: Dashan Turner
- Mascot: Wolverines

Stafford High School

- Fredericksburg, Virginia
- Principal: Chelsea Tryon
- Mascot: Indians
