= Adam Kennedy (American football) =

American football player (born 1991)

No. 12, 5, 8
- Position: Quarterback

Personal information
- Born: May 11, 1991 (age 35); Elk Grove, California, U.S.
- Listed height: 6 ft 4 in (1.93 m)
- Listed weight: 230 lb (104 kg)

Career information
- High school: Franklin (Elk Grove)
- College: Arkansas State
- NFL draft: 2014: undrafted

Career history
- New Orleans VooDoo (2014–2015); Tampa Bay Storm (2016)

Career AFL statistics
- Comp. / Att.: 405 / 668
- Passing yards: 4,398
- TD–INT: 69–21
- Passer rating: 92.76
- Rushing TD: 21
- Stats at ArenaFan.com

Adam Kennedy (born May 11, 1991) is an American former professional football quarterback who played in the Arena Football League (AFL). He played college football at Arkansas State University after transferring out of Utah State University and San Joaquin Delta College.

== Professional career ==
Kennedy was rated as the 32nd best quarterback in the 2014 NFL draft by NFLDraftScout.com. After going undrafted, he was invited to mini-camp with the Chicago Bears on a tryout basis.

Pre-draft measurables
Height	Weight	40-yard dash	10-yard split	20-yard split	20-yard shuttle	Three-cone drill	Vertical jump	Broad jump
6 ft 4 in (1.93 m)	223 lb (101 kg)	5.10 s	1.68 s	2.93 s	4.69 s	7.48 s	26 1/2 in (0.67 m)	9 ft 7 in (2.92 m)
All values from Arkansas State Pro Day

On June 10, 2014, Kennedy was assigned to the New Orleans VooDoo of the Arena Football League (AFL). In his first week with the team, he beat out fellow rookie, Brian Hudson, to become the VooDoo starting quarterback. Kennedy started the final seven games for the VooDoo, leading them to a 1–6 recording during that time. In September 2014, the VooDoo picked up Kennedy's rookie option to retain him for the 2015 season.

On December 7, 2015, Kennedy was assigned to the AFL's Tampa Bay Storm.

== Career statistics ==
=== AFL ===
Year	Team	Passing							Rushing		
Year	Team	Cmp	Att	Pct	Yds	TD	Int	Rtg	Att	Yds	TD
2014	New Orleans	145	246	58.9	1,535	26	7	91.77	37	75	10
2015	New Orleans	260	422	61.6	2,863	43	14	93.35	36	114	11
2016	Tampa Bay	62	108	57.4	707	14	6	86.46	14	73	3
Career		467	776	60.2	5,105	83	27	91.89	87	262	24

=== College ===
Year	Team	Passing							Rushing			
Year	Team	Comp	Att	Yards	Pct.	TD	Int	QB rating	Att	Yards	Avg	TD
2011	Utah State	76	110	972	69.1	11	4	169.0	55	239	4.3	0
2012	Utah State	1	1	0	100.0	0	0	100.0	1	5	5.0	0
2013	Arkansas State	217	314	2,341	69.1	11	6	139.5	153	524	3.4	4
Career		294	425	3,313	69.2	22	10	136.2	209	768	3.7	4
