= Spotsylvania County Public Schools =

School district in Virginia, United States

Location
- 8020 River Stone Drive Spotsylvania Fredericksburg, Virginia, 22407; United States

District information
- Type: Public, school division
- Motto: Together, we prepare our students for their future.
- Grades: K–12
- Superintendent: Dr. Clint Mitchell
- Schools: 31

Students and staff
- Students: 24,064 (2023-24)
- Teachers: 1,846

Other information
- Website: www.spotsylvania.k12.va.us

Spotsylvania County Public Schools is a public school district serving Spotsylvania County, Virginia. It consists of 17 Elementary, 7 Middle, and 5 High Schools and has a total enrollment of nearly 24,000 students. The Spotsylvania County School division also has a Career and Technical Center and participates with other local school systems to offer the Commonwealth Governor's School. The district partners with area businesses to develop learning opportunities for the students.

== History ==
In 1870 the public education system in Spotsylvania County was established with segregated one-room schools. These schools were gradually abandoned for larger buildings combining both elementary and high schools. The former Spotsylvania High School was a state-of-the-art building when constructed in 1939 for $158,000. During the twentieth century, the school system moved from scattered one-room schools for elementary education to consolidated schools for grades 1–12, to an integrated system in 1968. Until that time, most African American children attended one-room schools until the John J. Wright Consolidated School opened in 1952. Since 1968, the school system has evolved to the present system of separate elementary, middle, and high schools.

Robert E. Lee High School became the first accredited high school in the County in 1920. It was built in 1914 at Spotsylvania Courthouse. The building was destroyed by fire in 1941.

More recently, the district pushed their start dates to before Labor Day (2005), switched from 7 period day (50-minute class) schedule to an A Day/B Day block schedule with 90-minute class periods at the secondary level (2006), implemented the Parents Access for Students' Success (PASS) program (2008), and switched to a 10-point grading system.

In early 2021, Robert E. Lee Elementary had its name changed to Spotsylvania Elementary.

In November 2021, the school board decided that any book it deemed to have explicit sexuality be taken out of circulation from school libraries. However, a lawyer for the board decided that this would be against the United States Constitution, and the board rescinded the plan.

Scott Baker, the superintendent, announced his resignation in 2021 and planned to leave his post at the termination of his existing contract. In January 2022, the composition of the school board changed due to an election, and the largest faction in members had conservative beliefs. The new board immediately fired Baker despite the fact he had already resigned. In September 2022 the board selected Mark Taylor as the new superintendent; Taylor had no prior experience in the educational sector. A group of parents, criticized the move.

On January 23, 2024, superintendent Mark Taylor was placed on administrative leave for unknown reasons.

== Governance ==
=== Superintendent ===
The superintendent of Spotsylvania County Public Schools is Dr. Clint Mitchell. Prior to his appointment in 2024, he served as superintendent of Colonial Beach Public Schools. He was also the 2024 Virginia Region III Superintendent of the Year and the 2021 Virginia Principal of the Year.

=== School Board ===
The school board has seven members elected to oversee the school administration. School board members are elected every four years. One school board member is elected from each magisterial district in the county. The elections are staggered and non-partisan.

The following are the current school board members.

Position	Name	District	Year Elected
Chair	Megan Jackson	Livingston	2023
Vice-Chair	Belen Rodas	Chancellor	2023
Member	Jennifer Craig-Ford	Battlefield	2025
Member	Lawrence DiBella III	Berkeley	2025
Member	Carol Medawar	Courtland	2023
Member	Rich Lieberman	Lee Hill	2025
Member	Lorita C. Daniels	Salem	2019

==== School board member arrested for forgery ====
On February 23, 2023, school board member (and former chairman) Kirk Twigg was arrested on two charges: forging a public record, a felony, and tampering with a county record, a misdemeanor. Twigg was indicted by a Spotsylvania grand jury before turning himself in at a magistrate's office. He was released on a personal recognizance bond. Though court records do not state specifically what Twigg is suspected of doing, both alleged offenses took place on or about June 21 and involve a county contract. Twigg was the chairman of the school board at that time. Twigg had also received national attention when, during a school board meeting in 2021, he publicly called for burning books stating that he wanted to "see the books before we burn them so we can identify within our community that we are eradicating this bad stuff."

In December of 2023, a deal was worked out by special prosecutor Jim Hingeley, the commonwealth’s attorney in Albemarle County, and defense attorney Jeffrey Mangeno, whereby the felony charge against Twigg was dismissed. Twigg did not enter a plea to the misdemeanor charge, but that charge will also be dismissed in a year as long as Twigg complies with certain conditions and pays restitution totaling $10,164 by Dec. 20 of 2024.

== Schools ==
=== High Schools ===
- Chancellor High School
- Courtland High School
- Massaponax High School
- Riverbend High School
- Spotsylvania High School

=== Middle School ===
- Battlefield Middle School
- Chancellor Middle School
- Freedom Middle School
- Ni River Middle School
- Post Oak Middle School
- Spotsylvania Middle School
- Thornburg Middle School

=== Elementary Schools ===
- Battlefield Elementary School
- Berkeley Elementary School
- Brock Road Elementary School
- Cedar Forest Elementary School
- Chancellor Elementary School
- Courthouse Road Elementary School
- Courtland Elementary School
- Harrison Road Elementary School
- Spotsylvania Elementary School
- Lee Hill Elementary School
- Livingston Elementary School
- Parkside Elementary School
- Riverview Elementary School
- Salem Elementary School
- Smith Station Elementary School
- Spotswood Elementary School
- Wilderness Elementary School

=== Commonwealth Governor's School ===
The Commonwealth Governor's School (CGS) is one of 18 magnet Governor's Schools in Virginia. The Commonwealth Governor's School is a half-day program for gifted and highly motivated students based on a school-within-a-school model. Unlike many school programs, CGS is merit based (getting in to the program is based on a list of things, each with a certain number of points assigned) . Students are selected from Stafford, Spotsylvania, Caroline, and King George counties. Students may attend CGS in grades 9 through 12.

=== John J. Wright Educational & Cultural Center ===
John J. Wright Educational & Cultural Center is built on the site of the first high school for black students in Spotsylvania County. The original building, known as the Snell Training School, was built in 1913 by the Spotsylvania Sunday School Union under the leadership of John J. Wright, a prominent county educator.

The original building was destroyed by fire in 1941. The Spotsylvania County School Board agreed to erect a new school on 20 acres (81,000 m^{2}) of land donated by the Sunday School Union and to pay the teachers' salaries. Completed in 1952, the John J. Wright Consolidated School was opened to all county black youth in grades 1–12. When the school system integrated in 1968, the school became John J. Wright School, housing the county's entire sixth and seventh grade enrollment.

In 1978, with the closing of Spotsylvania Junior High School and the opening of Battlefield Intermediate School, the eighth grade was moved to the intermediate level.

During 1981–82, while the John J. Wright building underwent extensive renovation, the school occupied the current Marshall Building across from the present day Spotsylvania Middle School. In the fall of 1982, John J. Wright School reopened with many added improvements, including central air conditioning, wall-to-wall carpet and a new kitchen and cafeteria.

With the opening of Spotsylvania Intermediate School in the fall of 1982, John J. Wright Intermediate School began serving the predominantly southern portion of Spotsylvania County, with an approximate enrollment of 700 students in grades six, seven, and eight.

On July 1, 1990, the name John J. Wright Intermediate School was officially changed to John J. Wright Middle School in keeping with the Commonwealth's restructuring plan for middle school education.

In 1991–92, John J. Wright Middle School was recognized by the Virginia Department of Education for its outstanding middle school practices, including reading and public speaking, community involvement, rewards and recognition, and technology education.

During the summer of 1997, two areas of John J. Wright Middle School were dedicated to two long-term employees. The library was dedicated in honor of Dr. Sadie Coates Combs Johnson, a former teacher and librarian for thirty-one years. The athletic fields were dedicated in honor of William H. Poindexter, custodian of John J. Wright Middle School. In April of the following spring, a ceremony was held to dedicate a sign, commissioned and funded by a joint Parent Teacher Organization and community endeavor, identifying the fields behind the school as the William H. Poindexter Athletic Fields.

In 2001, the school board commissioned an architectural firm to propose a plan to renovate and expand JJW's facilities. Due to the cost of the needed improvements and the inability to purchase additional land to expand the athletic fields, the school board decided to build a replacement building for JJW to open in 2006, adjacent to Spotsylvania High School.

In 2008, after extensive renovations and modernization the doors reopened as the John J. Wright Educational and Cultural Center. Today, John J. Wright offers educational services to Spotsylvania County students from Pre-K through 12th Grade.

=== Spotsylvania Career and Technical Center ===
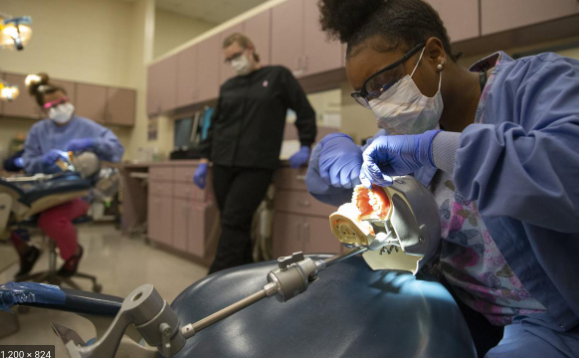
A Spotsylvania Career and Tech Dentistry student practices what they have learned hands on.

The Spotsylvania Career and Technical Center, commonly referred to as SCTC, serves all the High Schools in the Spotsylvania school district. Most students who apply to one of the nineteen programs at the center often commit to a two-year program of study. The SCTC mission statement is "The mission of the Center is to prepare students with the knowledge and skills necessary to enter the workforce directly out of high school or to enter a post-secondary educational or training program that compliments their program of study at the SCTC." Some of the pathway programs students are able to enroll in include Metal Trades, Health and Medical Pathways, Construction Pathways, Video/Media Pathways, Dental Assisting, Medical Assisting, and Veterinary Science.
