= E. J. Jenkins =

American football player (born 1998)

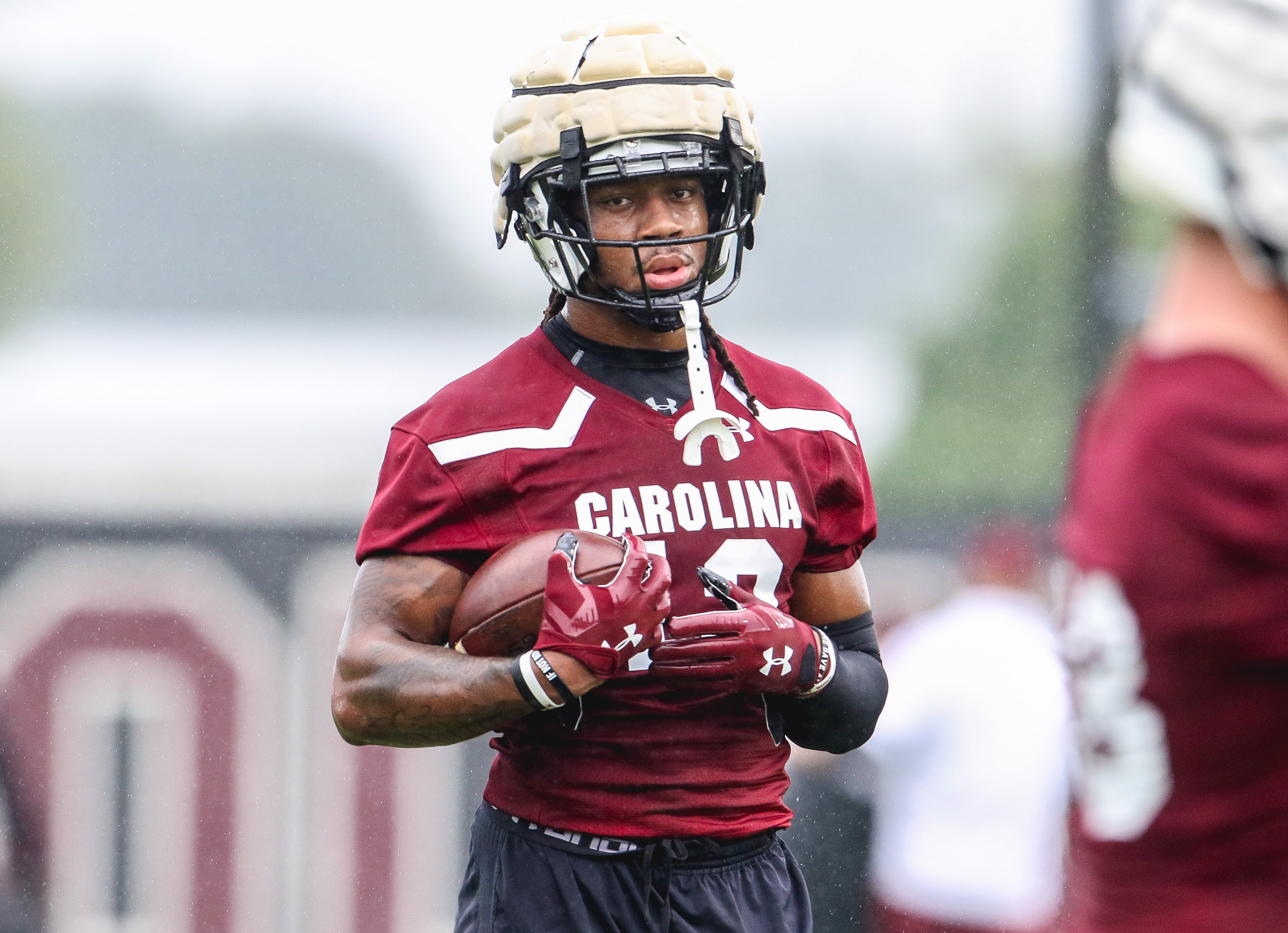

No. 84 – Atlanta Falcons
- Position: Tight end
- Roster status: Practice squad

Personal information
- Born: November 3, 1998 (age 28); Fredericksburg, Virginia, U.S.
- Listed height: 6 ft 6 in (1.98 m)
- Listed weight: 245 lb (111 kg)

Career information
- High school: Chancellor (Fredericksburg, Virginia)
- College: Saint Francis (2017–2020); South Carolina (2021); Georgia Tech (2022)
- NFL draft: 2023: undrafted

Career history
- New York Jets (2023)*; Philadelphia Eagles (2023)*; Las Vegas Raiders (2023)*; Philadelphia Eagles (2024–2026); Atlanta Falcons (2026–present)*
- * Offseason or practice squad member only

Awards and highlights
- Super Bowl champion (LIX)

Career NFL statistics as of 2026
- Receptions: 1
- Receiving yards: 7
- Receiving touchdowns: 1
- Stats at Pro Football Reference

Emanuel E. "E. J." Jenkins (born November 3, 1998) is an American professional football tight end for the Atlanta Falcons of the National Football League (NFL). He played college football for the Saint Francis Red Flash, South Carolina Gamecocks and Georgia Tech Yellow Jackets. He was signed by the New York Jets as an undrafted free agent in 2023 and has also been a member of the Las Vegas Raiders.

== Early life ==
Jenkins was born on November 3, 1998, in Fredericksburg, Virginia. He attended Chancellor High School where he played football and basketball, recording 44 receptions for 1,002 yards and 16 touchdown as a senior. He was named first-team all-conference and the Free Lance-Star Male Athlete of the Year. He set five school receiving records, including for career receiving yards and receiving touchdowns. He was a three-star recruit and initially committed to play college football for the Old Dominion Monarchs, but later opted to play for the Saint Francis Red Flash, joining his friend and high school quarterback Jason Brown.

== College career ==
Jenkins redshirted as a freshman at Saint Francis in 2017. The following year, he caught five passes for 52 yards. He had a breakout season in 2019, finishing with 39 catches for 779 yards while breaking the school record with 13 receiving touchdowns. He was named second-team All-Northeast Conference (NEC) for his performance. Saint Francis canceled their 2020 season due to the COVID-19 pandemic.

Jenkins transferred to the South Carolina Gamecocks in 2021. He appeared in 12 games for the Gamecocks, totaling eight receptions for 117 yards. He entered the NCAA transfer portal for a second time in 2022, ultimately transferring to the Georgia Tech Yellow Jackets. In his only season there, he appeared in all 12 games, starting 11, and recorded 17 catches for 316 yards along with three touchdowns. He was invited to the Hula Bowl at the conclusion of his collegiate career.

== Professional career ==
Pre-draft measurables
Height	Weight	Arm length	Hand span	Wingspan	40-yard dash	10-yard split	20-yard split	20-yard shuttle	Three-cone drill	Vertical jump	Broad jump	Bench press
6 ft 6 in (1.98 m)	245 lb (111 kg)	34 1/8 in (0.87 m)	9 5/8 in (0.24 m)	6 ft 9 7/8 in (2.08 m)	4.62 s	1.62 s	2.66 s	4.38 s	7.52 s	32 in (0.81 m)	10 ft 2 in (3.10 m)	14 reps
All values from Pro Day

=== New York Jets ===
Jenkins impressed at his pro day, but ultimately was not selected in the 2023 NFL draft. He signed with the New York Jets as an undrafted free agent. He caught three passes for 23 yards during preseason, but was ultimately waived by the Jets at the final roster cuts, on August 29, 2023.

=== Philadelphia Eagles (first stint) ===
On November 1, 2023, Jenkins was signed by the Philadelphia Eagles to the practice squad. He was released from the practice squad on November 14.

=== Las Vegas Raiders ===
Jenkins signed with the Las Vegas Raiders to the practice squad on January 2, 2024, prior to the team's season finale. He was released on January 15.

=== Philadelphia Eagles (second stint) ===
Jenkins returned to the Eagles by signing a reserve/future contract with the team on January 18, 2024. He was waived on August 27, and re-signed to the practice squad. On December 7, Jenkins was promoted to the active roster. In Week 18 against the New York Giants Jenkins made his first career catch and touchdown on a 7 yard pass from Tanner McKee. He won a Super Bowl championship when the Eagles defeated the Kansas City Chiefs 40–22 in Super Bowl LIX.

On August 26, 2025, Jenkins was waived by the Eagles as part of final roster cuts and re-signed to the practice squad the next day. He signed a reserve/future contract on January 13, 2026. On October 22, 2026, Jenkins was waived.

=== Atlanta Falcons ===
On October 26, 2026, Jenkins was signed to the Atlanta Falcons practice squad.
