= Courtland High School =

Public high school in Virginia, US

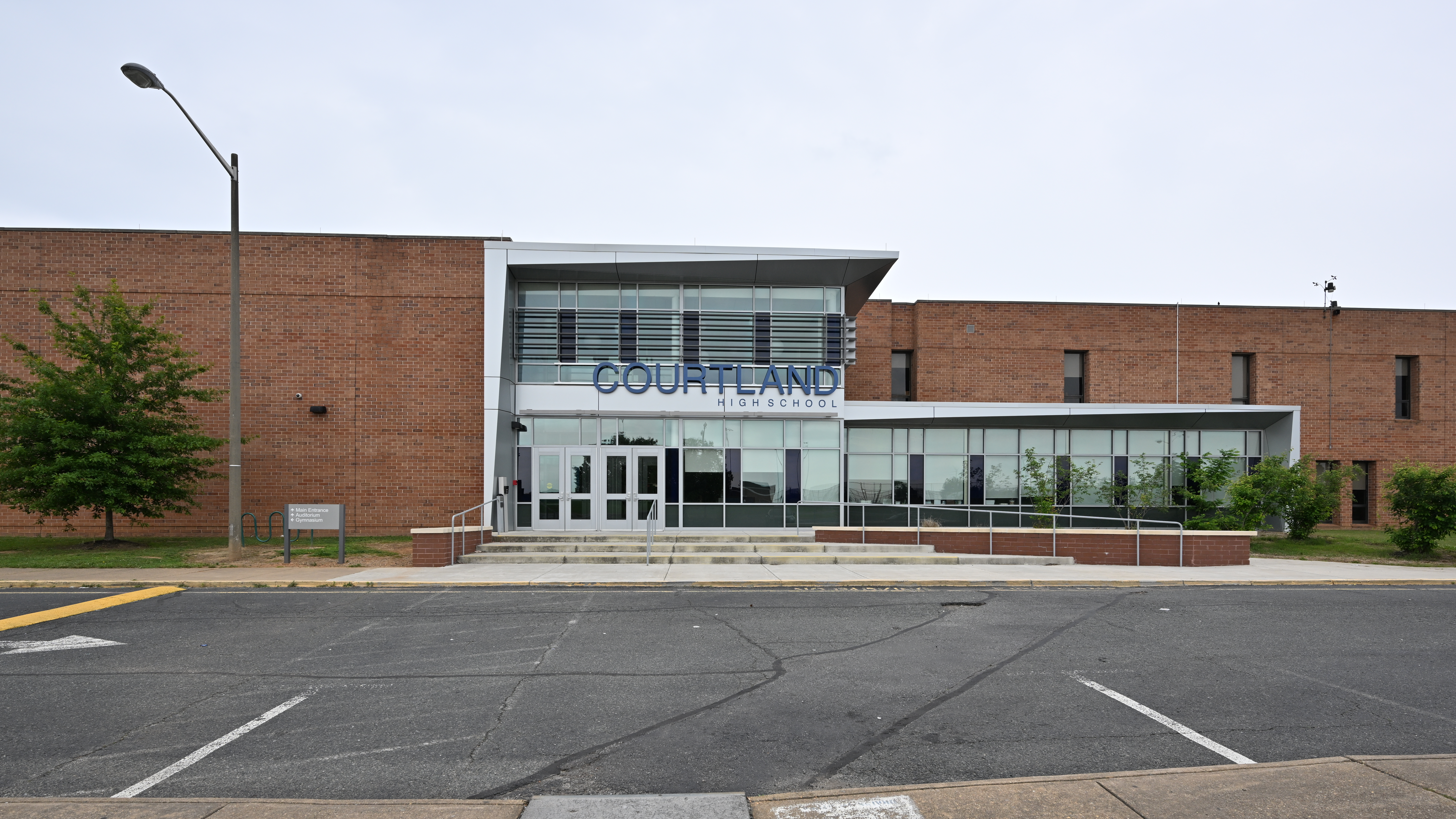

Location
- 6701 Smith Station Road; Spotsylvania, Virginia 22553; United States; 38°13′54″N 77°33′07″W

Information
- School type: Public high school
- Founded: 1980
- School district: Spotsylvania County Public Schools
- Superintendent: Scott Baker
- Principal: Cliff Conway
- Staff: 70.52 (FTE)
- Grades: 9–12
- Enrollment: 1,555 (2019-2020)
- Student to teacher ratio: 19.19
- Colors: Royal Blue and Silver
- Team name: Cougars
- Newspaper: The Courtland Chronicle
- Communities served: Fredericksburg
- Feeder schools: Spotsylvania Middle School; Battlefield Middle School; Freedom Middle School
- Website: Official Site

Courtland High School is a public high school located in Spotsylvania County, Virginia. Founded in 1980, Courtland currently has 1,174 students (2021–2022 school year).

== History ==
Courtland High School was founded in 1980 as Spotsylvania County's second public high school, after Spotsylvania High School. Courtland High school got a new renovation in 2019, this renovation included renewing the office to look more modern and replacing the football field to a new blue field. The renovation also updated the stairwells to improve the look.

== Academics ==
The school has good academics in terms of preparing students for advanced education. They have a 96% graduation rate and 39% of students participate in AP courses. As for students who go onto have higher education 63% of graduates pursue college or a technical degree.

== Students by ethnicity ==
The diversity of the student population is 18% White, 59% Black, 15% Hispanic, 2% Asian.

== Athletics ==
Courtland has won the following state championships:

- AA Football in 1982, 1983, and 1985.
- AAA Football in 1987.

- AA field hockey in 2004 and 2005.
- AA Div 4 Men's Basketball in 2009.
- AA Men's Baseball 1995 and 2000.
- Girls' Gymnastics in 1986.
- Girls' Track AA State Champions in 2004 and 2006
- 4A Boys' Track & Field Individual State Champions

== Notable alumni ==
- Danny McBride
- Adam Gentry Survivor season 13
- Ryan McBroom - MLB player
- Derrick M. Anderson - Assistant Secretary of Defense for Special Operations and Low-Intensity Conflict
