= Adin Huntington =

American gridiron football player (born 2002)

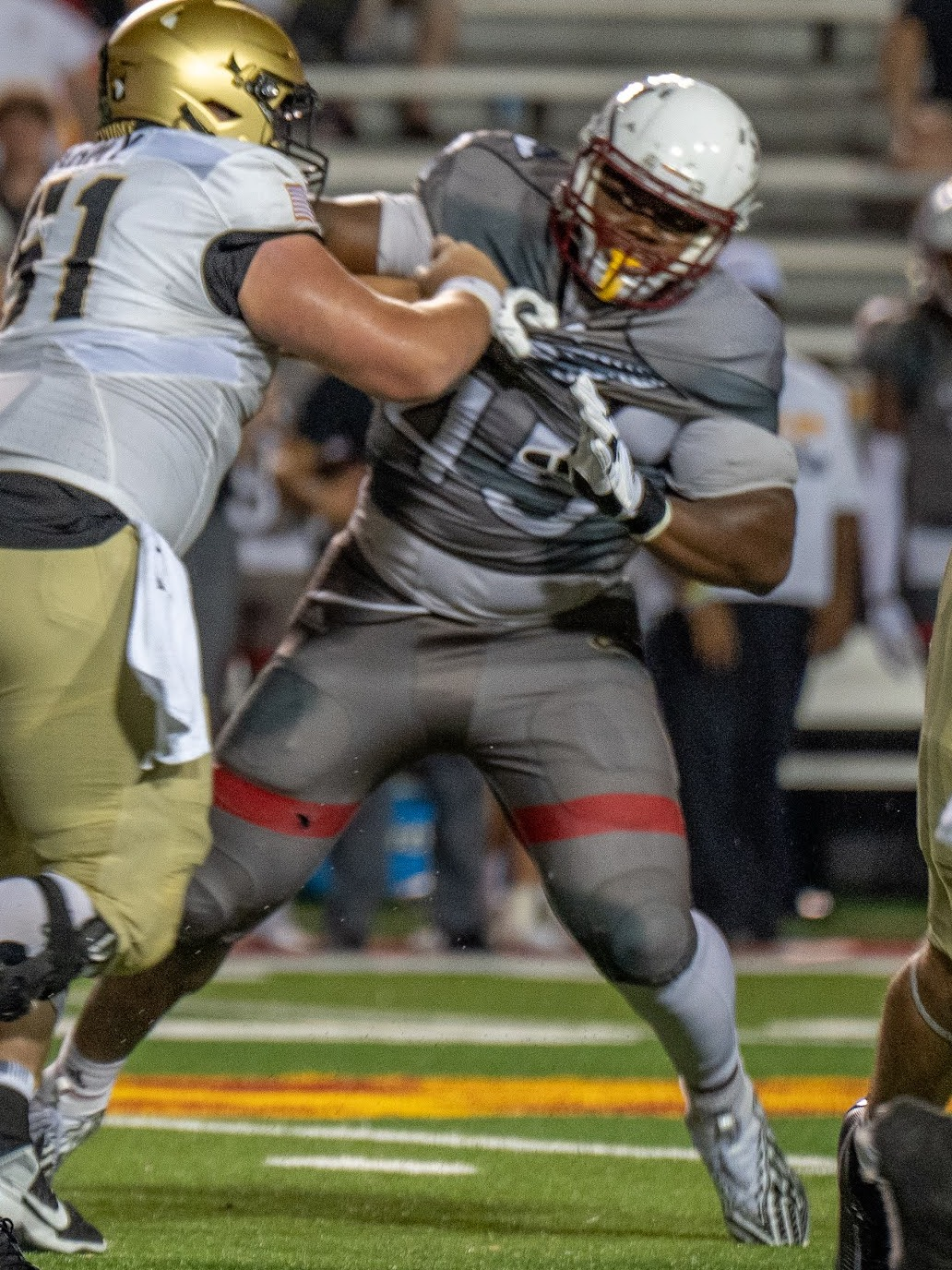
- Huntington with Louisiana–Monroe in 2023

No. 98 – Cleveland Browns
- Position: Defensive tackle
- Roster status: Active

Personal information
- Born: March 18, 2002 (age 24); Stafford, Virginia, U.S.
- Listed height: 6 ft 1 in (1.85 m)
- Listed weight: 281 lb (127 kg)

Career information
- High school: Mountain View (Stafford)
- College: Kent State (2020–2022); Louisiana–Monroe (2023); Tulane (2024)
- NFL draft: 2025: undrafted

Career history
- Cleveland Browns (2025–present)

Awards and highlights
- Second-team All-Sun Belt (2023); Third-team All-AAC (2024)

Career NFL statistics
- Total tackles: 35
- Sacks: 4
- Forced fumbles: 1
- Fumble recoveries: 1
- Stats at Pro Football Reference

Adin Huntington (born March 18, 2002) is an American professional football defensive tackle for the Cleveland Browns of the National Football League (NFL). He previously played college football for the Kent State Golden Flashes, Louisiana–Monroe Warhawks, and Tulane Green Wave.

== Early life ==
Huntington attended high school at Mountain View located in Stafford, Virginia. Coming out of high school, he committed to play college football for the Kent State Golden Flashes.

== College career ==
=== Kent State ===
During his three-year career at Kent State from 2020 through 2022, he tallied 45 tackles with eight going for a loss and three sacks, where after the conclusion of the 2022 season, Huntington decided to enter his name into the NCAA transfer portal.

=== Louisiana–Monroe ===
Huntington transferred to play for the Louisiana–Monroe Warhawks. In week two of the 2023 season, he recorded 14 tackles and a half a sack in a win over Lamar. During the 2023 season, he totaled 63 tackles with 16 going for a loss, eight and a half sacks, and three forced fumbles. He earned 2nd-team all conference honors in the Sun Belt. After the conclusion of the 2023 season, Huntington once again decided to enter his name into the NCAA transfer portal.

=== Tulane ===
Huntington transferred to play for the Tulane Green Wave. He finished the 2024 season, recording 30 tackles, four sacks, and two forced fumbles, where for his performance he was named to the AAC all-conference third team.

== Professional career ==
Pre-draft measurables
Height	Weight	Arm length	Hand span	Wingspan	40-yard dash	10-yard split	20-yard split	20-yard shuttle	Three-cone drill	Vertical jump	Broad jump	Bench press
6 ft 0 7/8 in (1.85 m)	281 lb (127 kg)	32 in (0.81 m)	9 3/4 in (0.25 m)	6 ft 5 7/8 in (1.98 m)	4.64 s	1.61 s	2.65 s	4.41 s	7.52 s	38.0 in (0.97 m)	10 ft 6 in (3.20 m)	30 reps
All values from Pro Day

After not being selected in the 2025 NFL draft, Huntington signed with the Cleveland Browns as an undrafted free agent. On August 23, head coach Kevin Stefanski announced that Huntington had made the team.
