= Colonial Beach Public Schools =

School district in Virginia, United States

Colonial Beach Town Public Schools

Address
- 400 Lincoln Ave Colonial Beach, Virginia, 22443-2324; United States

District information
- Type: Public
- Grades: Pre-K through 12
- Established: 1907
- Superintendent: Felix Addo
- School board: 5 members
- Chair of the board: Michelle Payne
- Governing agency: Virginia Department of Education
- Schools: 2

Other information
- Website: www.cbschools.net

Colonial Beach Town Public Schools is a school division in Virginia that serves the students of Colonial Beach, a town in Westmoreland County. It includes residential areas of the town. The district administers two schools: one elementary school and one high school. It was established in 1907.

== Administration ==
The superintendent of Colonial Beach Public Schools Felix Addo. The previous superintendent, Dr. Clint Mitchell, was appointed the Superintendent of Spotsylvania County Public Schools.

=== School Board ===
There are five members of the Colonial Beach Public School Board:

- Michelle Payne, Chairman
- Patrice Lyburn, Vice Chairman
- Laura Allison
- Audra Lucas-Peyton
- Terri McClure

== Schools ==
There are two schools in Colonial Beach. Both schools in the district are accredited (Colonial Beach High School is accredited with conditions).

- Colonial Beach High School (grades 8-12)
- Colonial Beach Elementary School (grades PreK-7)
