= Robert Soderholm =

American football player (born 2000)

Profile
- Position: Long snapper

Personal information
- Born: September 15, 2000 (age 26); Stafford, Virginia
- Listed height: 6 ft 0 in (1.83 m)
- Listed weight: 242 lb (110 kg)

Career information
- High school: Mountain View (Stafford, Virginia)
- College: VMI (2018–2022)
- NFL draft: 2023: undrafted

Awards and highlights
- 2× First-team All-SoCon (2021, 2022)

Robert William Soderholm III (born September 15, 2000) is an American football long snapper. He played college football for the VMI Keydets.

== Early life ==
Soderholm grew up in Stafford, Virginia and attended Mountain View High School. He played linebacker and long snapper on the football team after having played center in middle school. Soderholm decided to attend the Virginia Military Institute (VMI) on an Army ROTC scholarship and walk-on to the football team.

== College career ==
Soderholm became the VMI Keydets' long snapper during his freshman season. He was named first team All-Southern Conference (SoCon) as a senior. Soderholm used the extra year of eligibility granted to college athletes due to the COVID-19 pandemic and returned to VMI for a fifth season. He repeated as a first team All-SoCon selection during his senior season. After the conclusion of his college career Soderholm played in the 2023 Senior Bowl.

== Professional career ==
Pre-draft measurables
Height	Weight	Arm length	Hand span	40-yard dash	10-yard split	20-yard split	20-yard shuttle	Three-cone drill	Vertical jump	Broad jump	Bench press
5 ft 11 1/2 in (1.82 m)	240 lb (109 kg)	30 1/2 in (0.77 m)	9 in (0.23 m)	5.10 s	1.78 s	2.90 s	4.59 s	7.71 s	29.0 in (0.74 m)	9 ft 4 in (2.84 m)	27 reps
All values from Pro Day

Soderholm went unselected in the 2023 NFL draft. He took part in a rookie minicamp with the Seattle Seahawks on a tryout basis, but he was not offered a contract.

== Personal life ==
Soderholm was commissioned as a second lieutenant in the United States Army Reserve shortly after his final football season.
