= TyJuan Garbutt =

American gridiron football player (born 1999)

Profile
- Position: Defensive end

Personal information
- Born: July 14, 1999 (age 27); Fredericksburg, Virginia, U.S.
- Listed height: 6 ft 2 in (1.88 m)
- Listed weight: 255 lb (116 kg)

Career information
- High school: Riverbend (Fredericksburg)
- College: Virginia Tech (2017–2022)
- NFL draft: 2023: undrafted

Career history
- 2023–2024: Winnipeg Blue Bombers
- 2025–2026: Hamilton Tiger-Cats
- Stats at CFL.ca

TyJuan Garbutt (born July 14, 1999) is an American professional football defensive end. He most recently played for the Hamilton Tiger-Cats of the Canadian Football League (CFL). He played college football at Virginia Tech.

== Early life ==
Garbutt attended Riverbend High School in Fredericksburg, Virginia. He recorded 68 tackles (33 of which were solo), seven sacks, seven forced fumbles and two fumble recoveries his senior year. He also totaled 211 rushing yards and 554 receiving yards with nine touchdowns as a senior. Garbutt earned USA Today second-team all-state honors as a defensive lineman in 2016. He was rated the No. 2 defensive end in the state of Virginia by Scout.com.

== College career ==
Garbutt played college football for the Virginia Tech Hokies. He was redshirted in 2017.

He played in 13 games, starting five, in 2018, recording 31 tackles and one sack. Garbutt appeared in 11 games, all starts, in 2019, accumulating 31 tackles and one sack for the second consecutive year. He played in four games during the 2020 after missing part of the year to take care of this sick father. He appeared in 13 games, starting 11, during the 2021 season, recording 30 tackles, 3.5 sacks, and two forced fumbles. Garbutt played in nine games, all starts, in 2022, totaling 29 tackles, 6.5 sacks, and two forced fumbles. He was named the ACC Defensive Lineman of the Week on September 12, 2022 after accumulating 3.0 tackles-for-loss, one sack, one force fumble, one pass breakup and four quarterback hurries against the Boston College Eagles.

Overall, he made 121 tackles and 12 sacks during his college career.

== Professional career ==
Pre-draft measurables
Height	Weight	Arm length	Hand span	Wingspan	40-yard dash	10-yard split	20-yard split	20-yard shuttle	Three-cone drill	Vertical jump	Broad jump	Bench press
6 ft 1 5/8 in (1.87 m)	268 lb (122 kg)	33 1/4 in (0.84 m)	10 1/8 in (0.26 m)	6 ft 7 5/8 in (2.02 m)	4.85 s	1.64 s	2.79 s	4.58 s	7.30 s	32.0 in (0.81 m)	9 ft 7 in (2.92 m)	23 reps
All values from Pro Day

=== Winnipeg Blue Bombers ===
Garbutt was signed to the practice roster of the Winnipeg Blue Bombers of the Canadian Football League on July 29, 2023. He was promoted to the active roster on October 26 and dressed in one game for the Blue Bombers, recording one defensive tackle, before being placed on injured reserve on November 10, 2023.

He was placed on the 6-game injured list on June 5, 2024 after suffering a fractured ankle. He was activated from injured reserve on July 18. He became a free agent upon the expiry of his contract on February 11, 2025.

=== Hamilton Tiger-Cats ===
On February 12, 2025, it was announced that Garbutt had signed with the Hamilton Tiger-Cats to a two-year contract. He played in six games in 2025 where he had nine defensive tackles and one sack. He began the 2026 season on the six-game injured list and was eventually released on August 19, 2026.
