= Aiden Fisher =

American football player (born 2003)

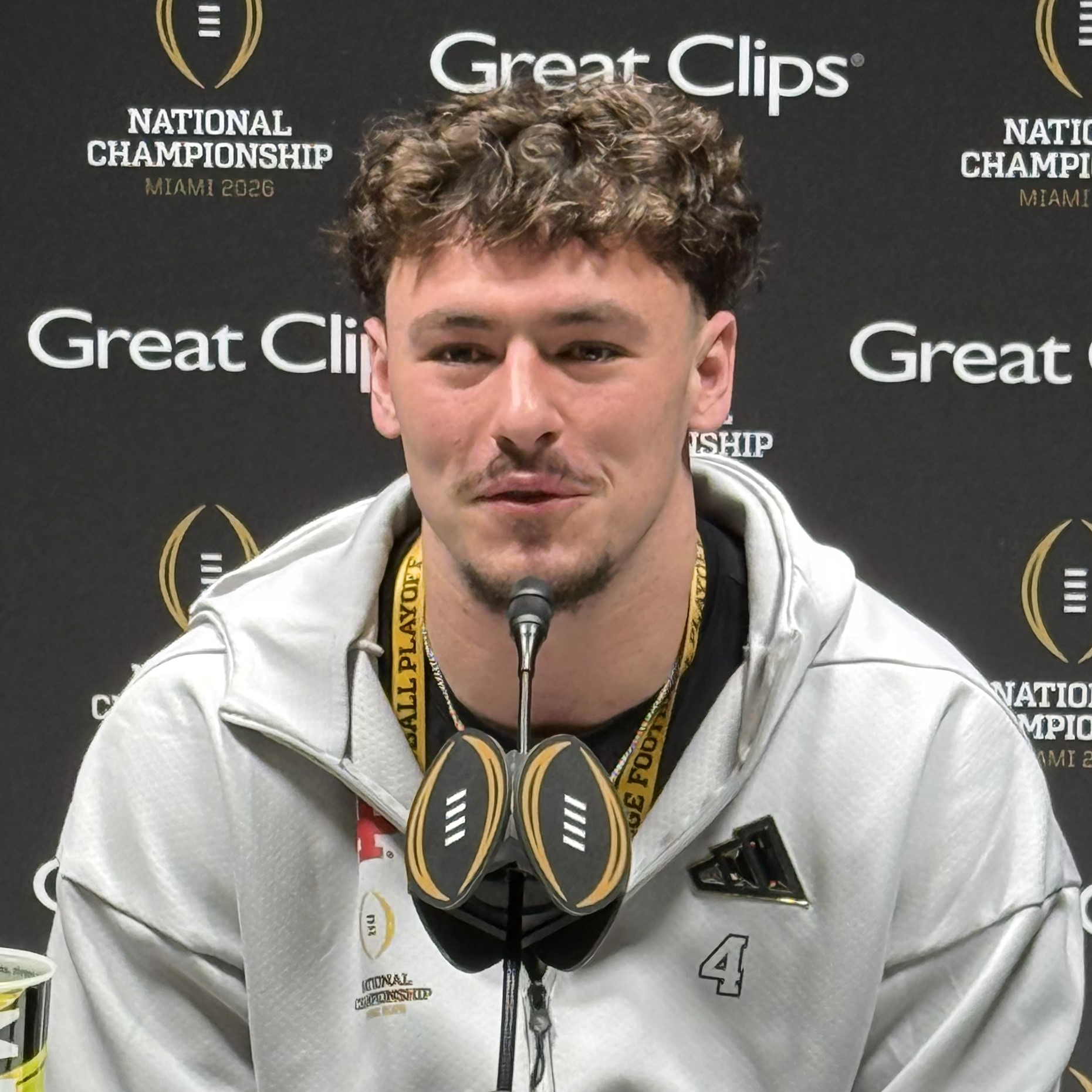
- Fisher in 2026

No. 59 – Kansas City Chiefs
- Position: Linebacker
- Roster status: Practice squad

Personal information
- Born: December 23, 2003 (age 22)
- Listed height: 6 ft 1 in (1.85 m)
- Listed weight: 231 lb (105 kg)

Career information
- High school: Riverbend (Spotsylvania County, Virginia)
- College: James Madison (2022–2023); Indiana (2024–2025)
- NFL draft: 2026: 7th round, 243rd overall pick

Career history
- Houston Texans (2026); Kansas City Chiefs (2026–present)*
- * Offseason or practice squad member only

Awards and highlights
- CFP national champion (2025); 2× First-team All-American (2024, 2025); 2× First-team All-Big Ten (2024, 2025); Third-team All-Sun Belt (2023)

Career NFL statistics as of Week 4, 2026
- Tackles: 1
- Stats at Pro Football Reference

Aiden Fisher (born December 23, 2003) is an American professional football linebacker for the Kansas City Chiefs of the National Football League (NFL). He played college football for the James Madison Dukes and Indiana Hoosiers and was selected by the Texans in the seventh round of the 2026 NFL draft.

== Early life ==
Fisher attended Riverbend High School in Spotsylvania County, Virginia. He was rated as a three-star recruit and committed to play college football for the James Madison Dukes, over the Old Dominion Monarchs.

== College career ==
=== James Madison ===
During his first two seasons in 2022 and 2023, Fisher appeared in 23 games where he notched 113 tackles with six being for a loss, a sack and a half, seven pass deflections, and an interception. After the 2023 season, Fisher entered his name into the NCAA transfer portal.

=== Indiana ===
Fisher transferred to play for the Indiana Hoosiers. Heading into the 2024 season with the Hoosiers, Fisher was named to the Butkus Award watch list. He was named a first-team All-American in 2024 and 2025. He recorded four tackles and a sack in Indiana's win against the Miami Hurricanes in the 2026 College Football Playoff National Championship.

== Professional career ==
Pre-draft measurables
Height	Weight	Arm length	Hand span	Wingspan	40-yard dash	10-yard split	20-yard split	20-yard shuttle	Vertical jump	Broad jump	Bench press
6 ft 0 7/8 in (1.85 m)	232 lb (105 kg)	31 1/8 in (0.79 m)	9 1/2 in (0.24 m)	6 ft 5 3/8 in (1.97 m)	4.76 s	1.63 s	2.73 s	4.51 s	37.5 in (0.95 m)	10 ft 3 in (3.12 m)	18 reps
All values from NFL Combine/Pro Day

=== Houston Texans ===
Fisher was selected by the Houston Texans in the seventh round with the 243rd overall pick of the 2026 NFL draft. He was waived from the Texans on October 17.

=== Kansas City Chiefs ===
On October 21, 2026, Fisher signed with the Kansas City Chiefs practice squad.
