= Rashard Kelly =

American basketball player (born 1995)

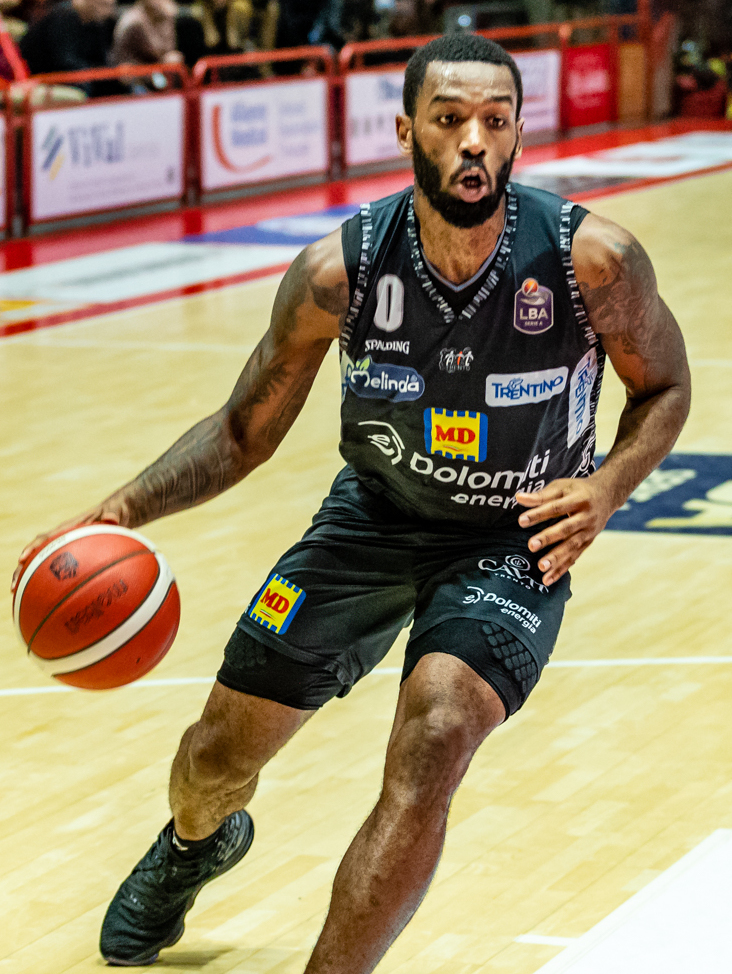
- Kelly in 2020

No. 7 – Karşıyaka Basket
- Position: Small forward / power forward
- League: Basketbol Süper Ligi

Personal information
- Born: August 22, 1995 (age 31) Fredericksburg, Virginia, U.S.
- Listed height: 6 ft 7 in (2.01 m)
- Listed weight: 227 lb (103 kg)

Career information
- High school: Chancellor (Fredericksburg, Virginia); Bishop O'Connell (Arlington, Virginia); Massanutten Military Academy (Woodstock, Virginia); Hargrave Military Academy (Chatham, Virginia)
- College: Wichita State (2014–2018)
- NBA draft: 2018: undrafted
- Playing career: 2018–present

Career history
- 2018–2019: Parma
- 2019–2020: Aquila Basket Trento
- 2020–2021: Gaziantep
- 2021–2022: JDA Dijon
- 2022–2023: Tasmania JackJumpers
- 2023: BC Wolves
- 2023: Prometey
- 2023–2024: ADA Blois
- 2024–2026: Aomori Wat's
- 2026: Capitanes de Arecibo
- 2026–present: Karşıyaka Basket

Career highlights
- VTB United League All-Star (2019)

Rashard DaeQuan Kelly (born August 22, 1995) is an American professional basketball player for Karşıyaka Basket of the Turkish Basketbol Süper Ligi (BSL). He played college basketball for the Wichita State Shockers.

== High school career ==
Kelly began playing basketball at age four and grew up playing against older competition. Following his freshman season at Chancellor High School in Fredericksburg, Virginia, he transferred upon his mother's advice to Bishop O'Connell High School in Arlington, Virginia, due to its superior basketball program and academics. As a senior, Kelly played for Massanutten Military Academy in Woodstock, Virginia, before completing a postgraduate year at Hargrave Military Academy in Chatham, Virginia to gain more recruiting attention. He played for D.C. Assault on the Amateur Athletic Union circuit.

== College career ==
Kelly played college basketball for Wichita State for four years. As a junior, he was named to the Missouri Valley Conference All-Bench Team. Kelly averaged 5.5 points and 4.8 rebounds per game. As a senior, Kelly averaged 5.6 points and 7.6 rebounds per game, grabbing a school-record 104 offensive rebounds. He became the sixth player in program history to win at least 100 career games.

== Professional career ==
After going undrafted in the 2018 NBA draft, Kelly signed with Russian club Parma of the VTB United League. He played in the 2019 VTB United League All-Star Game. In 26 appearances, Kelly averaged 11 points, 7.7 rebounds and 1.9 assists per game.

On July 11, 2019, Kelly signed a one-year deal with Aquila Basket Trento of the Italian Lega Basket Serie A (LBA) and the EuroCup. Kelly averaged 10.6 points, 6.1 rebounds, 2.4 assists, 1.3 steals and 1 block per game in LBA play. In March 2020, he returned to the United States amidst the COVID-19 pandemic.

On July 22, 2020, Kelly signed with Gaziantep Basketbol of the Turkish Basketball Super League. Kelly averaged 11.9 points, 8.0 rebounds, 2.0 assists and 1.4 steals per game.

On July 16, 2021, Kelly signed with JDA Dijon Basket of the LNB Pro A.

On June 21, 2022, Kelly signed with the Tasmania JackJumpers in Australia for the 2022–23 NBL season.

On March 1, 2023, Kelly signed with BC Wolves of the Lithuanian Basketball League (LKL). He parted ways with the club on July 30, 2023.

On December 16, 2023, he signed with ADA Blois of the Betclic Élite.

On July 31, 2024, Kelly signed with Aomori Wat's of the B.League.

On August 11, 2026, he signed with Karşıyaka Basket of the Turkish Basketbol Süper Ligi (BSL).
