= Thomas A. Edison High School (Fairfax County, Virginia) =

High school in Fairfax County, Virginia, United States

Coordinates: 38°46′56″N 77°08′01″W

Thomas Alva Edison High School

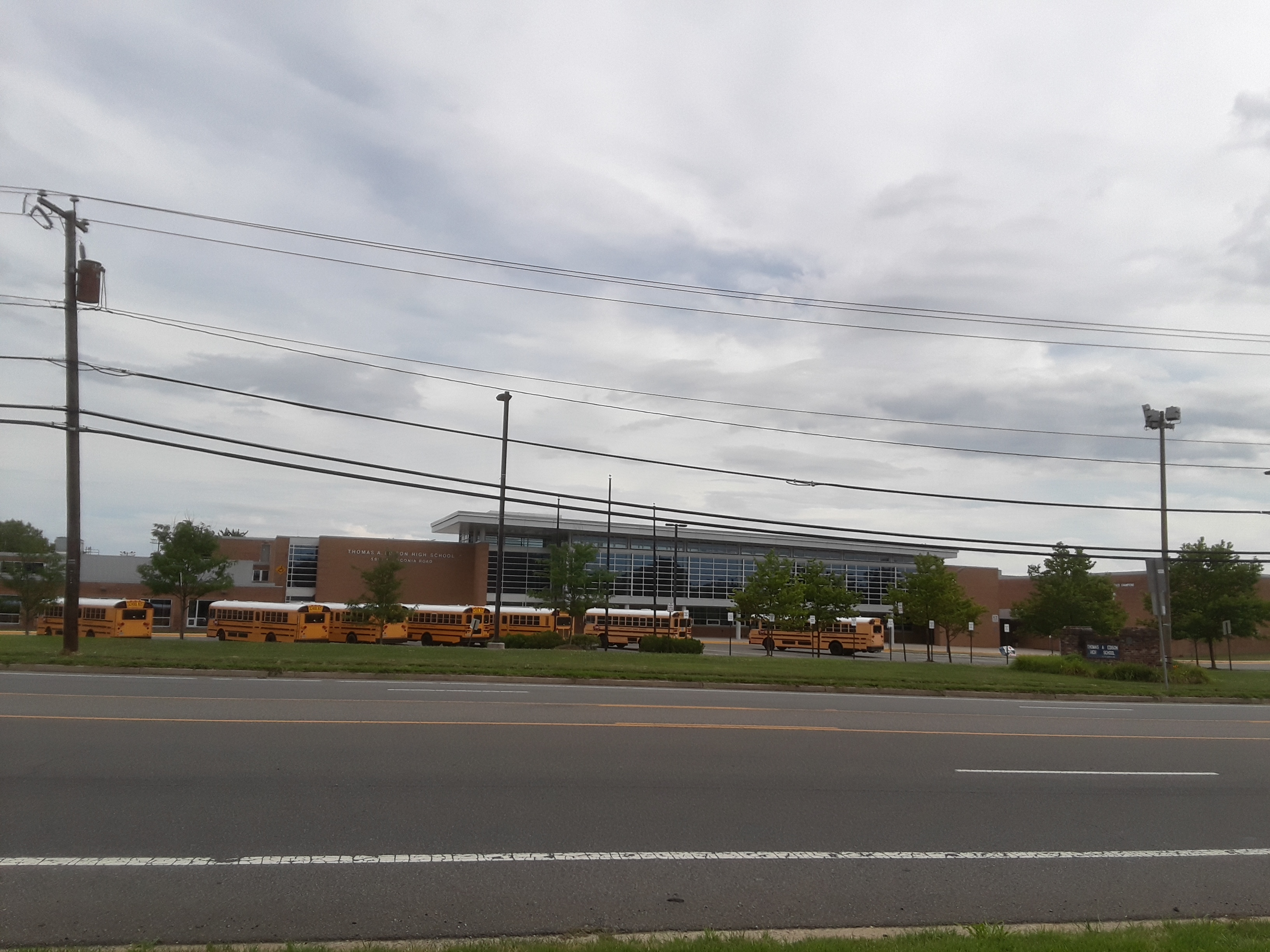

Location
- 5801 Franconia Road; Alexandria, Virginia 22310; United States

Information
- School type: Public, high school
- Motto: "As eagles we soar"
- Established: 1962
- School district: Fairfax County Public Schools
- Principal: Amanda Burke
- Staff: Approximately 230
- Grades: 9–12
- Enrollment: 2,294 (2025-2026)
- Campus: Suburban
- Colors: Red, white, and navy blue
- Athletics conference: National District; Northern Region
- Mascot: Eagles
- Rivals: Hayfield Secondary School, Mount Vernon High School
- Feeder schools: Mark Twain Middle School, Wendell Holmes Middle School
- Website: edisonhs.fcps.edu

Thomas Alva Edison High School is one of 25 high schools in Fairfax County, Virginia, United States. Thomas Edison is an International Baccalaureate school.

Edison High School has traditionally been a relatively small public high school in terms of the size of its student population. It has a culturally and ethnically diverse student body. Since the mid 1990s it enrolled students of Australian, Korean, Eritrean, Vietnamese, Chinese, Thai, Cambodian, Polish, Italian, Mexican, Colombian, Ghanaian, Cameroonian, and Pakistani ancestries or nationalities. The diverse religious backgrounds of the students that have included students that identify as Buddhists, Christians, Jews, Muslim, and others. The school's diversity reflected the massive influx of immigrants to the Northern Virginia region.

In the 1990s, the school's debate and forensics teams gained widespread and even national recognition for their achievements in those fields. Its academic team has appeared on the local television quiz bowl game show It's Academic, which is broadcast by the local Washington, DC PBS affiliate station and substation, WETA PBS (main) and WETA METRO (substation).

Edison's graduates have typically moved on to attend local and state colleges and universities such as Virginia Tech, the University of Virginia, George Mason University, Virginia Commonwealth University, and Northern Virginia Community College. Prominent graduates of the school include Eric Barton, a professional football player with the National Football League.

In both 1996 and 1997 Edison's theater club won second place and then first place and the regional level of the VHSL one-act play festival.

== Demographics ==
Presented below are some demographics for Thomas Edison during the 2021–22 school year:

Gender	Edison percentage	FCPS high school average
Male	50.4%	52.0%
Female	49.6%	48.0%

Ethnicity	Edison percentage	FCPS high school average
American Indian / Alaska Native	0.5%	0.3%
Asian	13.2%	19.3%
Black/ African American	18.0%	9.8%
Hispanic/ Latino	36.3%	27.7%
Native Hawaiian/ Pacific Islander	0.1%	0.1%
Two or more races	5.4%	6.1%
White	26.5%	36.7%

== Test scores ==
Edison High School is a fully accredited high school based on the Standards of Learning tests in Virginia. The average SAT score in 2006 for Edison was 1494 (502 in Critical Reading, 505 in Math, and 487 in Writing).

== Edison Academy ==
The Edison Academy is a career center where 10th-12th graders can take courses based on a career they want to pursue when they finish school. It helps them build the skills they need for a successful career. Edison High School is one of the selected schools in Fairfax County to have an academy center.

One of the school-specific programs offered through the Edison Academy to eligible students is the Global STEM Challenges Program: The program at Edison includes the Global STEM Challenges Program. It is a three-year program for 9th grade to 11th graders that aims to provide hands-on science, math, and engineering experience in order to provide experience and knowledge on real-world problems and their possible solutions.

== International Baccalaureate program ==
Edison High School is one of 90 schools in the state of Virginia to have an International Baccalaureate program.

== Athletics ==
Edison participates in the AAA National District of the 6A North Region. Sports offered to students include:

- Cheerleading
- Cross country (coed)
- Field hockey
- Football
- Golf (coed)
- Volleyball (boys' and girls')
- Basketball (boys' and girls')
- Gymnastics
- Swim & dive (coed)
- Indoor track & field (coed)
- Baseball
- Lacrosse (boys' and girls')
- Soccer (boys' and girls')
- Softball
- Outdoor track & field (coed)
- Wrestling (boys' and girls')
- Girls flag football

== Notable alumni ==
- Eric Barton, former NFL linebacker
- Charlie Hales, former mayor of Portland, Oregon
- Christopher Lowman, Assistant Secretary of Defense for Sustainment, former Under Secretary of the Army
- Andy Najar, soccer player for D.C. United and the Honduras national team
- Pat Toomay, 1966, former NFL defensive end, Super Bowl champion (VI), author
