= Riverbend High School =

Location
- 12301 Spotswood Furnace Road; Fredericksburg, Virginia 22407; United States; 38°17′42.5″N 77°34′31.7″W

Information
- Type: Public High School
- Established: 2004
- School district: Spotsylvania County Public Schools
- Superintendent: N/A
- CEEB code: 470 887
- Principal: Chawrdi Elliott
- Grades: 9–12
- Enrollment: 1926 (2017-18)
- Language: English
- Colors: Royal Blue and Emerald Green
- Athletics conference: Virginia High School League; AAA Northwest Region; AAA Commonwealth District; Conference 4
- Mascot: Bear
- Feeder schools: Chancellor Middle School, Freedom Middle School, and Ni River Middle School
- Website: https://www.spotsylvania.k12.va.us/o/riverbend

Riverbend High School is a public secondary school located in Spotsylvania, Virginia, and is part of Spotsylvania County Public Schools. Opened in 2004, Riverbend is Spotsylvania County's newest high school. The school mascot is a bear and the school colors are royal blue and emerald green. The high school has an enrollment of around 2,000 students in grades 9–12.

== Athletics ==
Riverbend High School is part of the AAA Commonwealth District and offers volleyball, boys' and girls' tennis, lacrosse, cross country, boys' and girls' soccer, field hockey, cheerleading, football, golf, boys' and girls' basketball, wrestling, swimming, baseball, softball, and spring track and field.

Fall	Winter	Spring
Cheer	Basketball - Boys	Baseball
Cross Country	Basketball - Girls	Lacrosse - Boys
Field Hockey	Cheer	Lacrosse - Girls
Football	Indoor Track	Soccer - Boys
Golf	Swimming	Soccer - Girls
Volleyball	Wrestling	Softball
		Tennis - Boys
		Tennis - Girls
		Track

== Performing arts ==
=== Band ===
The Riverbend Bands have been performing since the school's opening in 2004. An advanced honors band for those interested in other music is the Left Bank Jazz Ensemble, which performs at concerts and go on a field trip in December to Wilderness ES and Brock Road ES for a Christmas Tour.

== Notable alumni ==
- Aiden Fisher, NFL linebacker for the Houston Texans
- TyJuan Garbutt, professional football player

== See also ==
- List of high schools in Virginia
- AAA Commonwealth District
