= North Stafford High School =

American public high school

Location
- 839 Garrisonville Rd; Stafford, Virginia 22554; United States; 38°28′1″N 77°27′20″W

Information
- Type: Public High School
- Established: 1981
- School district: Stafford County Public Schools
- Superintendent: Daniel W. Smith
- Principal: Dashan Turner
- Teaching staff: 122.47 (on an FTE basis)
- Grades: 9-12
- Enrollment: 1,863 (2021–22)
- Student to teacher ratio: 15.21
- Color
- Athletics conference: Virginia High School League; AAA Northwest Region; AAA Commonwealth District; 6A North Region; Conference 15 6A
- Mascot: Wolverines
- Nickname: North Nation
- Rival: Stafford Senior High School, Brooke Point High School
- Newspaper: The North Star
- Feeder schools: H.H. Poole Middle School (Majority); A.G. Wright Middle School (Minority); Rodney E. Thompson Middle School (Minority); Shirley C. Heim Middle School (Minority); Stafford Middle School (Minority)
- Website: nshs.staffordschools.net

North Stafford High School is one of the five high schools in the Stafford County, Virginia public school system. It instructs students in grades 9 through 12.

== History ==
Completed in 1981, North Stafford High School was the second high school to be built in Stafford County. Robert White served as the school's principal from 1981 until 1997. Numerous changes occurred in the school during the next five years under the guidance of principals Henry Johnson and James Stemple including changing the school's colors to the current colors of Navy blue, Columbia blue, and Orange.

The school underwent major renovations in 2003 including the construction of an additional wing on the school for foreign language and to account for overcrowding. The renovation also included adding a new art studio and weight room.

In the summer of 2014, North Stafford High School underwent roof replacement. The project was approximately valued at $2,979,000, and covered 7 acres of roofing. All Stafford County schools are enhancing their security systems outside, installing an Aiphone near the front entrance of the buildings to keep the entire building secure during the school day. Visitors will be required to show form of I.D. and explain the reason of visit to be let into the building. Over the summer of 2017, the school's gymnasium and library went under construction. The gymnasium was completed in September 2017, while the library was completed in November 2017.

From the fall of 2023 to 2024, renovations took place on the auditorium, including installing a new lighting system.

In 2024, Stafford County Public Schools, in collaboration with Madison Energy Infrastructure, finished a large solar array on the school's roof, the largest school rooftop solar array in Virginia. The project is expected to save approximately $2.8 million in electric bills over the next quarter-century.

== Location and demographics ==
North Stafford High School campus

North Stafford is located on State Route 610, or Garrisonville Road, approximately 3 miles from I-95 and U.S. Route 1. The school's attendance zone covers mostly the housing developments along Route 610 between Shelton Shop Road and I-95. Due to the influx of population in Stafford County in recent years, the school's attendance zones and enrollment have fluctuated greatly. In 2021–2022 North Stafford's student population was 30% White, 25% Black, 34% Hispanic, and 4% Asian/Pacific Islander.

== Academics and extracurricular activities ==
The school has received Full Accreditation since 2002 and has met AYP in all but one of those years. Students at North Stafford are offered a variety of choices of study, including the option of Advanced Placement (AP) or Dual Enrollment (DE) courses. Classes not offered at North Stafford but in another Stafford County Public School can be traveled to, allowing students to explore various interests. The Commonwealth Governor's School has one of its 5 locations at North Stafford High School. This magnet school program features a unified curriculum of advanced core classes and cooperative teaching. This program is available grades 9-12. Enrolled students take all of their core classes at the North Stafford Site. Students who are not based at a school with a CGS site are bused to a different site for these four courses. Mountain View students travel to participate in this program.

== Athletics ==
North Stafford currently competes varsity teams in 16 different sports as a member of 6A Conference 15 and 6A North Region of the Virginia High School League. The school also fields an Ice Hockey team as a club sport, and the Wolverine Thunder Step Team.

The Wolverine Thunder Step Team was selected as one of the four finalists in the "National Step Battle" sponsored by Sony Pictures and Stomp the Yard. Receiving over 50% of the vote, North Stafford's Wolverine Thunder won the competition, along with a trip for the team to New York City.

North Stafford has achieved 9 VHSL state championships. The girls' gymnastics team won four straight state titles from 1987–1991 and the field hockey team won a state title in 1988. Since the VHSL state cheerleading competition began in 1997, North Stafford has won 3 state titles (1999, 2001, 2004). The school's hockey team, which plays in the NVSHL, has also won 2 state championships in its 4 years of existence. The North Stafford Boys' Soccer team won the Virginia 1 AAA State Championship in June 2011. North Stafford Varsity Volleyball team won the district and regional championships in 2011. In 2011, the North Stafford boys' soccer team became the first high school soccer team from Stafford County to win the State Championship. During their championship run, they defeated national powerhouses; Deep Run and Frank Cox. North Stafford peaked at number 1 on ESPN's top 50 boys' soccer teams in the country.

District and Regional Championships

== Notable alumni ==
- American Soccer player Chris Carrieri, Class of 1998
- American Baseball player John Maine, Class of 1999
- American Football player Nate Ilaoa, Class of 2001
- American Soccer player Sheldon Sullivan, Class of 2013
- American Football player Joey Slye, Class of 2014
- American Football player Shawn Asbury II, Class of 2021
