= Dexter McDougle =

American football player (born 1991)

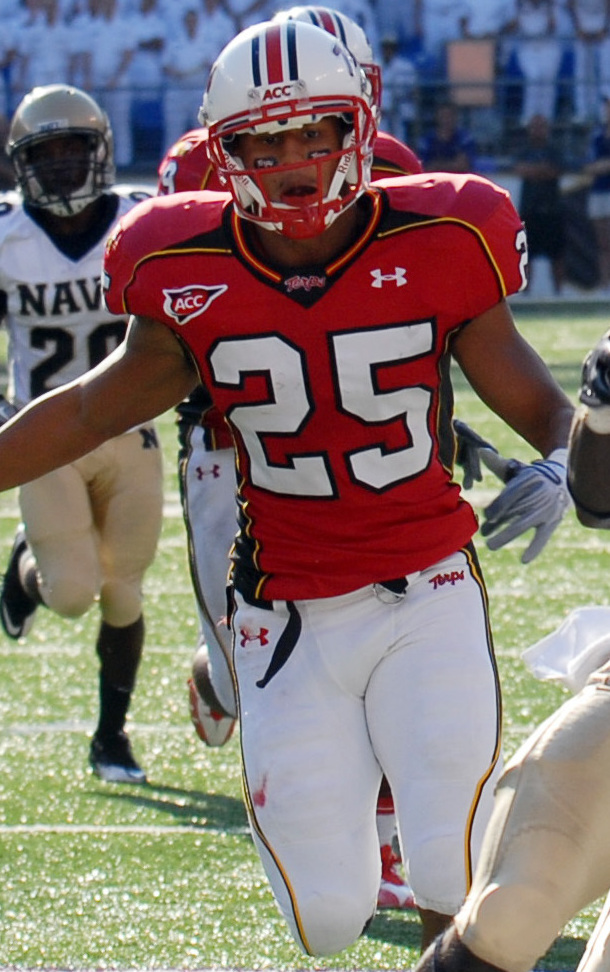
- McDougle with the Maryland Terrapins in 2010

No. 23, 30, 33, 34
- Position: Cornerback

Personal information
- Born: April 8, 1991 (age 35); Woodbridge, Virginia, U.S.
- Listed height: 5 ft 10 in (1.78 m)
- Listed weight: 190 lb (86 kg)

Career information
- High school: Stafford (Falmouth, Virginia)
- College: Maryland
- NFL draft: 2014: 3rd round, 80th overall pick

Career history
- New York Jets (2014–2016); Philadelphia Eagles (2017); New Orleans Saints (2017); Jacksonville Jaguars (2018)*; Detroit Lions (2018)*; Philadelphia Eagles (2018); Arizona Hotshots (2019); Winnipeg Blue Bombers (2020)
- * Offseason or practice squad member only

Career NFL statistics
- Total tackles: 18
- Pass deflections: 2
- Stats at Pro Football Reference

Dexter McDougle (born April 8, 1991) is an American former professional football player who was a cornerback in the National Football League (NFL). He was selected by the New York Jets in the third round of the 2014 NFL draft. He played college football for the Maryland Terrapins.

== Early life ==
McDougle played for Stafford Senior High School, where he was a teammate of wide receiver Torrey Smith, as well as at the University of Maryland. He played safety, cornerback, wide receiver and running back. He recorded 97 tackles and six interceptions as a senior in 2008 after missing most of his junior year with an injury. He also caught 48 passes for 885 yards and 11 touchdowns and rushed for 457 yards and nine scores on 76 carries.

Considered a three-star recruit by Rivals.com, he was rated the 76th best "athlete" prospect of his class.

== College career ==
At Maryland, McDougle was named an Academic All-Atlantic Coast Conference (ACC) in his sophomore and senior seasons. He missed the most of his senior year at Maryland due to a fractured shoulder.

== Professional career ==
Pre-draft measurables
Height	Weight	40-yard dash	10-yard split	20-yard split	20-yard shuttle	Three-cone drill	Vertical jump	Broad jump
5 ft 10 in (1.78 m)	195 lb (88 kg)	4.47 s	2.63 s	1.58 s	4.18 s	6.84 s	37 in (0.94 m)	10 ft 2 in (3.10 m)
All values from Pro Day

=== New York Jets ===
On May 10, 2014, McDougle was selected by the New York Jets in the third round (80th overall) of the 2014 NFL draft. On August 10, 2014, McDougle tore his ACL at Jets practice and was subsequently placed on the injured reserve.

McDougle was waived on September 4, 2016. After clearing waivers, he was signed to the team's practice squad. He was promoted to the active roster on November 12, 2016.

=== Philadelphia Eagles (first stint) ===
On August 27, 2017, McDougle was traded to the Philadelphia Eagles in exchange for Terrence Brooks. On September 2, 2017, he signed a one-year contract extension with the Eagles. During the 2017 season McDougle played 54 defensive snaps (9.3%) and 135 special teams snaps (49.8%) in eight games. Along with special teams, he served as the main backup to slot corner Patrick Robinson but was released on November 13, 2017 to make room for additional depth at linebacker.

=== New Orleans Saints ===
On November 21, 2017, McDougle signed with the New Orleans Saints, but was released one week later.

=== Jacksonville Jaguars ===
On January 23, 2018, McDougle signed a reserve/future contract with the Jacksonville Jaguars. He was released on August 11, 2018.

=== Detroit Lions ===
On August 20, 2018, McDougle was signed by the Detroit Lions. He was released on August 31, 2018.

=== Philadelphia Eagles (second stint) ===
On October 16, 2018, McDougle was signed by the Eagles. He was released on November 5, 2018.

=== Arizona Hotshots ===
On January 9, 2019, McDougle joined the Arizona Hotshots of the Alliance of American Football. The league ceased operations in April 2019.

=== Winnipeg Blue Bombers ===
McDougle signed with the Winnipeg Blue Bombers of the Canadian Football League on February 11, 2020. He was placed on the suspended list on July 9, 2021.
