= Brian Hudson =

American football player (born 1991)

No. 12, 15
- Position: Quarterback

Personal information
- Born: March 1, 1991 (age 35); Philadelphia, Pennsylvania, U.S.
- Listed height: 6 ft 3 in (1.91 m)
- Listed weight: 220 lb (100 kg)

Career information
- High school: Stafford (VA) Brooke Point
- College: Liberty (2009–2012); Campbell (2013)
- NFL draft: 2014: undrafted

Career history
- Calgary Stampeders (2014)*; New Orleans VooDoo (2014); Colorado Ice (2015)
- * Offseason or practice squad member only

Career AFL statistics
- Comp. / Att.: 0 / 3
- Passing yards: 0
- TD–INT: 0–0
- Passer rating: 39.58
- Rushing TD: 0
- Stats at ArenaFan.com

Brian Hudson (born March 1, 1991) is an American former professional football quarterback. He was signed by the Calgary Stampeders as an undrafted free agent in 2014. He played college football at Campbell University after transferring out of Liberty University.

== College career ==
Hudson committed to Liberty University on December 29, 2008. Hudson redshirted during his true freshman season, and did not see any playing time during his redshirt freshman season. Hudson saw limited action during his sophomore season, appearing in 3 games as a backup. With Mike Brown graduating in 2012, Hudson won the starting quarterback position for the Flames for the 2012 season. After falling out of the starting quarterback position at Liberty, Hudson transferred to Campbell University for his last season of eligibility. Hudson started all 12 games for the Fighting Camels, leading the team in passing and rushing.

=== College career statistics ===
Season	Passing							Rushing			
Season	Comp	Att	Yards	Pct.	TD	Int	QB rating	Att	Yards	Avg	TD
Liberty Flames
2009	Redshirt										
2010	0	0	0	–	0	0	–	0	0	–	0
2011	14	21	145	66.7	2	0	156.1	6	20	3.3	0
2012	39	67	498	58.2	4	1	137.4	28	70	2.5	1
Campbell Fighting Camels
2013	183	303	2,184	60.4	15	11	130.0	183	884	4.8	8
Career	236	391	2,827	60.4	21	12	132.7	217	974	4.5	9

== Professional career ==
=== Calgary Stampeders ===
On May 23, 2014, Hudson signed with the Calgary Stampeders of the Canadian Football League (CFL). Following their mini-camp, Hudson was released in June 2014.

=== New Orleans VooDoo ===
Hudson was assigned to the New Orleans VooDoo of the Arena Football League, along with Adam Kennedy, following a rash of injuries for the VooDoo. With just a week of practice, Kennedy beat out Hudson as the VooDoo's starting quarterback. The following week, Kennedy left the game with bruised ribs, and Hudson entered the game. Hudson finished the game 0-for-3 passing. Hudson remained with the VooDoo the rest of the season, appearing in more one game. During the offseason, the VooDoo picked up Hudson's rookie option to retain him for the 2015 season.

=== Colorado Ice ===
On May 5, 2015, Hudson was assigned to the Colorado Ice of the Indoor Football League. Hudson started his first game with the Ice against the Bemidji Axemen. Hudson struggled in what would turn out to be his lone start for the Ice, completing 1-of-9 passes for 13 yards and an interception. He was released on May 11, 2015.
