= Spotsylvania High School =

Location
- 6975 Courthouse Road; Spotsylvania, VA 22551; United States
- 38°09′36.2″N 77°39′11.2″W

Information
- Type: Public high school
- Established: 1940
- School district: Spotsylvania County Public Schools
- NCES District ID: 5103640
- NCES School ID: 510364001593
- Principal: Robert Marchetti
- Teaching staff: 106.57 (on an FTE basis)
- Grades: 9–12
- Enrollment: 1,394 (2024–25)
- Student to teacher ratio: 13.08
- Colors: Red and Navy Blue
- Athletics: Football, Track, Basketball, Soccer, Field Hockey, Wrestling, Girl's Soft Ball, Volleyball, Baseball, Golf, Swim
- Mascot: Knights
- Feeder schools: Spotsylvania Middle School; Post Oak Middle School
- Theme: Building relationships to promote a positive climate and culture
- Website: Official website
- All information is subject to change as the years go by

Spotsylvania High School is a public high school in Spotsylvania County, Virginia. It currently serves the southern half of the county. (Prior to 1981, the school served the entire county). The Knights are the least densely populated of the schools in the division. SHS houses the only International Baccalaureate programme in the division, as well as being one of two sites for the Commonwealth Governor's School. Both of these centers are made up of students accepted into the program who come from SHS, as well as other high schools in Spotsylvania County. SHS also works in partnership with Germanna Community College to offer the Gladys P. Todd academy, where students attend GCC during the day for their junior and senior years - achieving an associate degree along with their high school diploma upon graduation. The Original Spotsylvania High School opened in 1940 and three schools hosted the name of Spotsylvania High School.

As of the 2024–2025 school year, the school had an enrollment of 1,394 students and 106.57 classroom teachers (on an FTE basis), for a student–teacher ratio of 13.08.

== About the building ==
Spotsylvania High was the county's first consolidated high school for students who had previously attended much smaller schools in tiny rural communities including Marye and Margo. Spotsylvania High, on Courthouse Road, was considered state of the art when it opened; when numbers of students grew, the next Spotsylvania High School was built across the street in 1967. Black students from segregated John J. Wright High School began attending Spotsylvania High in 1964 and the school became fully integrated in 1968. The third Spotsylvania High opened in 1994.

Construction started on the school in May, 1992 and occupied in January, 1994. The cost of the project was reported to be $23.7 million. A total of 75.5 acres (306,000 m^{2}) were developed for the school. Within the building there is 257,066 square feet (23,882.2 m^{2}) of space. Total capacity is 1583 students in 79 classrooms. The auditorium can seat 1300, the gymnasium seats 2000, and the stadium seats 4000 people. Massaponax High School, built in 1998, was constructed from the same blueprint as Spotsylvania High School.

== Administration ==
As of 2023, Mr. Robert Marchetti is the principal of Spotsylvania High School. Assistant principals include Ms. Lisa Andruss, Mr. Brett Gibbons. Other administration staff include Ms. Michelle Hart as the Instructional Coordinator, Mr. Timothy Acors as the Activities Director, and Mr. Richard Munsell as the Administrative Intern .

Following the 2015–2016 school year, Principal Rusty Davis and Athletic Director Buddy Herndon were reassigned to different positions in the school system for unknown reasons.

== Advanced Placement Program and International Baccalaureate Programme ==
The Advanced Placement (AP) Program gives students the opportunity to pursue college-level studies while still at Spotsylvania County. Upon completion of the courses, students may receive advanced placement and/or credit when entering college. Academically oriented students are strongly encouraged to participate in the Advanced Placement Program. Students take these courses at high school. Advanced Placement (AP) courses follow the suggested College Board course curriculum and serve to prepare students for the AP examinations in May. AP Courses listed below are offered based on enrollment. However, depending on how many students sign up for an AP class, depends on which course is offered. So some of the courses may not be offered because there are not enough students that sign up for it. Grades earned carry weighted credit in the GPA calculation. The International Baccalaureate (IB) Programme's Diploma Program was recently added to SHS in 2016, with the Class of 2018 seeing its first graduates. As of 2021, the coordinator for the program is Ms. Catherine LaRocco.

== Athletics ==
In 2021, Moses Wilson secured his 100th victory on the last individual state finals match for the 126 lbs Virginia State championship match. Where he secured a major decision against his opponent. This made Moses the 1st individual wrestling state championship in Spotsylvania history in 30 years.

Spotsylvania High school has won 4 State championships since their existence. The first baseball State Championship is the 13–8 win in extra innings against Abingdon High School on June 9, 2018.

Football: 1991, 1994, 1997

Baseball: 2018

Track and Field: -Indoor High Jump State Champion 2018- Limiah Coleman -Indoor High Jump State Champion 2019- Limiah Coleman

== Junior Reserve Officers' Training Corps ==
Spotsylvania High School is home to the US Army JROTC "Knight Battalion." The battalion is composed of about 100 cadets from both Massaponax and Spotsylvania High School. The Knight Battalion often partakes in local events including the Spotsylvania County Christmas Parade and other community events. The Battalion has many different teams to offer, including the Raider Team, Drill Team, and Color Guard.

== Band, choir, and orchestra ==
Spotsylvania High School is known for its strong fine arts department. In 2018, the school re-established itself as a Blue Ribbon School of Music.

== Notable alumni ==
Huntley (born 1990), Musician and the winner of the 24th season of The Voice

== Notable faculty ==
- Bobby Orrock (born 1955), agriculture instructor who has been a member of the Virginia House of Delegates

== Sexual harassment ==
On October 23, 2015, two Spotsylvania High School students were sexually assaulted in the locker room by other members of the football team prior to a football game.
