= Massaponax High School =

School in Fredericksburg, Virginia, United States

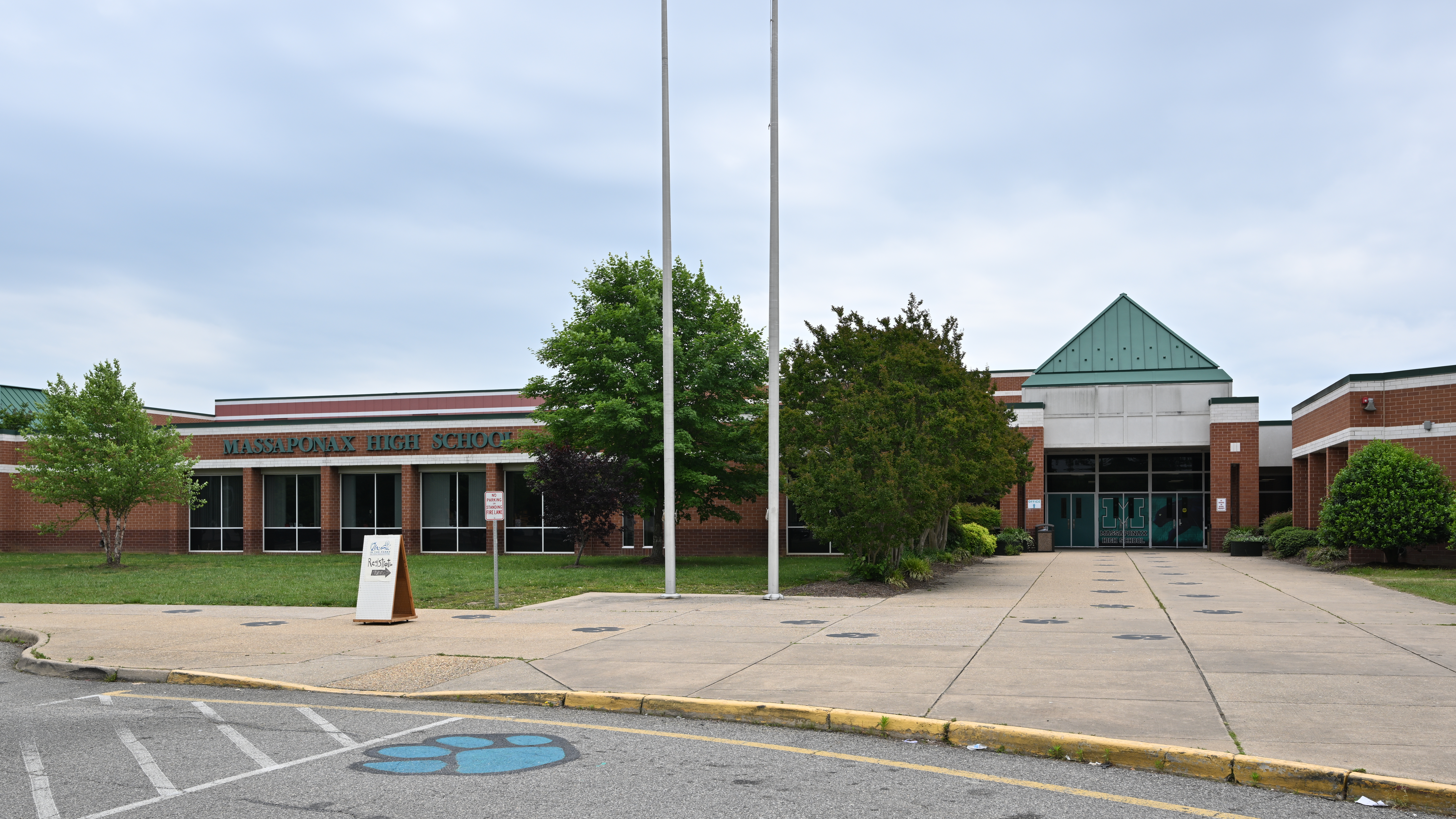

Location
- 8211 Jefferson Davis Highway; Fredericksburg, Virginia 22408; United States; 38°10′57.8″N 77°30′40.9″W

Information
- Opened: 1998; 28 years ago
- School district: Spotsylvania County Public Schools
- Principal: William Lancaster
- Teaching staff: 101.47 (on an FTE basis)
- Grades: 9–12
- Enrollment: 1703 (2021–22)
- Student to teacher ratio: 16.78
- Colors: Black, teal, silver
- Mascot: Panthers
- Feeder schools: Spotsylvania Middle School; Battlefield Middle School; Thornburg Middle School
- Website: Massaponax High School

Massaponax High School is a public school in Spotsylvania County, Virginia, United States. It is part of Spotsylvania County Public Schools.

== Athletics ==
Massaponax High School is part of the AAA Commonwealth District and AAA Northwest Region, and offers soccer, tennis, cheerleading, cross-country running, lacrosse, football, golf, volleyball, basketball, field hockey, ice hockey, swimming, wrestling, baseball, softball, track and field, and gymnastics.

Massaponax's football team reached the State Finals in 2003 following an undefeated regular season, but lost.

The Massaponax Maniacs is a student organization dedicated to cheering on school teams.

== Marching band ==
The marching band is known as the Massaponax Marching Panther Pride (MP²).

== Notable alumni ==
- Caressa Cameron, beauty pageant titleholder, winner of Miss Virginia 2009 and Miss America 2010
- DeAndre Houston-Carson, NFL player for Houston Texans
- Kelvin Jones, professional soccer player
- Jonathan Kim, professional football kicker
- The Head and the Heart bandmates Jonathan Russell and Tyler Williams attended MHS
- Greg Slaughter, Filipino-American professional basketball player

== See also ==
- List of high schools in Virginia
- AAA Commonwealth District
