= Stafford Senior High School =

Public school in Virginia, United States

Location
- 63 Stafford Indian Lane; Fredericksburg, Virginia 22405; United States
- 38°21′37″N 77°27′49″W

Information
- Other name: Stafford High School
- Type: Public high school
- Motto: TRIBE: Trust, Respect, Integrity, Betterment, Effort
- Established: 1926
- School district: Stafford County Public Schools
- Superintendent: Daniel W. Smith
- NCES School ID: 510366001602
- Principal: Chelsea Tryon
- Teaching staff: 191.02 (on an FTE basis)
- Grades: 9–12
- Enrollment: 2,198 (2024-2025)
- Student to teacher ratio: 11.51
- Campus type: Rural, Fringe suburban
- Colors: Royal Blue and Gold
- Fight song: Across the Field
- Athletics conference: Virginia High School League
- Mascot: Indian
- Nickname: Indians
- Newspaper: Smoke Signal
- Yearbook: Indian Legend
- Feeder schools: Dixon Smith Middle School (Majority); Edward E. Drew Jr. Middle School (Majority); T. Benton Gayle Middle School (Minority)
- Website: shs.staffordschools.net

Stafford Senior High School (colloquially known as Stafford High School and often called South Stafford High School) is a public high school in Stafford, Virginia, United States. It was established in 1926 and is part of the Stafford County Public Schools district.

== History ==
The former Stafford High School building from across the pond.

The first Stafford High School opened in 1926. The school was located near the Stafford County Courthouse in what is now part of the Alvin York Bandy Administrative Complex. In 1952 Stafford High School and Falmouth High School merged into one school. Prior to the merge, the mascots for the respective schools were the "Pioneers" and the "Indians." While Stafford High School was retained as the official name for the school, the mascot chosen was the "Indians." The combined school was located in what is now Edward E. Drew, Jr. Middle School. It was the only Stafford County high school from 1952 until 1981, when North Stafford High School was opened.

In 1975, Stafford High School moved to 33 Stafford Indian Lane. This building was built with an experimental open concept design and thus had no windows and open classrooms that later had to be divided up with thin walls to make individual classrooms. A new building began construction in June 2013 just behind the existing school. The new Stafford High School opened to students on September 14, 2015, a week later than the rest of the county schools. This delayed start was due to the failure of the construction company to substantially complete the school on time. With the move to the new school, the address changed to 63 Stafford Indian Lane.

In 2005, the Native American mascot controversy prompted the National Education Association to recommend schools with Native American-based mascots change their team names. Stafford High School's administration considered a name change until meeting with the local Patawomeck tribe, for whom the mascot was named. Tribal leaders overwhelmingly supported keeping the team name “Indians,” but were unhappy with the mascot's historical inaccuracy. The original mascot featured a full-feathered headdress more common to the Plains Indians than to the ancestral Patawomeck tribes native to the Stafford area. Stafford High School art teacher Nick Candela drafted the artwork for the new mascot and obtained support and approval from Tribal leaders and various school organizations. The new mascot was unveiled in late 2014.

In October 2022 almost one half of the population of the school and some teachers were absent with flu-like or gastrointestinal tract symptoms, prompting a health investigation.

== Athletics ==
Stafford High fields varsity teams in 14 different sports as a member of the Commonwealth District and Class 6 Region B of the Virginia High School League.

=== State Champions ===
- Baseball 2019
- Boys Cross Country 1996, 2011
- Boys Outdoor Track and Field 1968
- Cheerleading 2022, 2023
- Field Hockey 2005
- Girls Gymnastics 2017
- Softball 1982
- Theatre 1993–94, 2015–16, 2018–19, 2019–2020, 2020–2021, 2021-2022

== Governor's STEM Academy ==
Stafford High also serves as one of three locations (with Brooke Point High School and North Stafford High School) supporting the Stafford Academy for Technology (STAT), a program which focuses on information technology, mathematics, and engineering.

Goals of the STAT program include incorporating workplace experiences, implementing industry assessments, providing hands-on learning experiences, aligning curriculum to emerging job opportunities, and maintaining a strong partnership network, such as the Dual Enrollment agreement the program maintains with Rochester Institute of Technology (RIT).

== Notable alumni ==
- Oliver Ackermann, class of 1995, American rock musician
- Josh Ball, class of 2016, NFL player
- Wayne Elsey, class of 1983, businessman and philanthropist
- Mark Lenzi, class of 1986, Olympic diver and diving coach
- Dexter McDougle, class of 2009, NFL player
- Caelynn Miller-Keyes, class of 2013, television personality, model, and beauty pageant titleholder
- Jessica Player, class of 2000, child actress
- Jeff Rouse, class of 1988, Olympic swimmer
- Torrey Smith, class of 2007, NFL player
- Ginnie Sebastian Storage, class of 1982, 47th DAR President General
