= Brooke Point High School =

Location
- 1700 Courthouse Road; Stafford, VA 22554; United States; 38°24′24″N 77°23′45″W

Information
- School type: Public, high school
- Motto: "As One"
- Opened: 1993
- School district: Stafford County Public Schools
- Superintendent: Daniel W. Smith
- Principal: Joe Murgo
- Faculty: 188.00 (FTE)
- Grades: 9-12
- Enrollment: 2,150 (2022-23)
- Student to teacher ratio: 11.44
- Language: English
- Colors: Red, black and white
- Slogan: Soaring to new heights as one.
- Song: Where the Black Hawk Soars
- Athletics conference: Virginia High School League; Commonwealth District; Northwest Region
- Nickname: Blackhawks
- Rival: North Stafford High School
- Newspaper: The Hawkeye
- Yearbook: The Spectator
- Feeder schools: Shirley C. Heim Middle School (Majority); Stafford Middle School (Majority); Rodney E. Thompson Middle School (Minority); Edward E. Drew Jr., Middle School (Minority)
- Website: bphs.staffordschools.net

Brooke Point High School is a public high school located about 40 miles (64 km) south of Washington D.C. in Stafford, Virginia, United States. It is one of six high schools serving Stafford County Public Schools, and enrolls students in grades nine through twelve in the eastern portion of Stafford County. The school was opened in 1993.

== Academics ==
Brooke Point High School is accredited by the Virginia State Board of Education and Southern Association of Colleges and Schools, and has earned accreditation as an IB World School as of 2010. Brooke Point students are offered three options for their diploma: traditional, advanced, or IB diploma. They also offer a wide range of Advanced Placement courses.

== Athletics ==
Brooke Point High School competes in the AAA Commonwealth District of the Virginia High School League (VHSL).

The school takes part in the following sports:

- American football
- Baseball
- Basketball
- Cheerleading
- Cross country
- Field hockey
- Football
- Golf
- Gymnastics
- Lacrosse
- Soccer
- Softball
- Swimming
- Tennis
- Track
- Volleyball
- Wrestling

== Notable alumni ==
- Erin Cahill - actress
- Brian Hudson - former professional football player
- Chay Shegog - former professional basketball player
