= Mountain View High School (Stafford, Virginia) =

Location
- 2135 Mountain View Road; Stafford, Virginia 22556; United States
- 38°27′32″N 77°29′52″W

Information
- Type: Public High School
- Established: 2005
- School district: Stafford County Public Schools
- Superintendent: Dr. Daniel W. Smith
- Principal: Stefanie Sullivan
- Teaching staff: 126.59 (on an FTE basis)
- Grades: 9-12
- Enrollment: 2,047 (2020–21)
- Student to teacher ratio: 16.17
- Colors: Maroon, orange, and white
- Athletics conference: Virginia High School League; AAA Northwest Region; AAA Commonwealth District Conference 15 6A North Region
- Nickname: Wildcats
- Newspaper: The Viewpoint
- Yearbook: The Cat's Eye
- Communities served: Hartwood; Stafford
- Feeder schools: T. Benton Gayle Middle School (Minority); A.G. Wright Middle School (Majority); Rodney E. Thompson Middle School (Minority); H.H. Poole Middle School (Minority)
- Website: mvhs.staffordschools.net

Mountain View High School is a public high school in Stafford, Virginia, United States, for students in grades nine through twelve. It is part of Stafford County Public Schools.

== Demographics ==
The demographic breakdown of the 2,047 students enrolled in the 2020–21 school year was:

- Male - 50.46%
- Female - 49.54%
- Native American/Alaskan - 0.24%
- Asian - 2.93%
- Black - 11.48%
- Hispanic - 18.22%
- Native Hawaiian/Pacific Islander - 0.34%
- White - 59.41%
- Multiracial - 7.38%

18.1% of the students were eligible for free or reduced-price lunches.

== Athletics ==
- Cheerleading
- Cross Country
- Track and Field
- Field Hockey
- Football
- Golf
- Volleyball
- Gymnastics
- Swimming
- Wrestling
- Baseball
- Basketball
- Lacrosse
- Soccer
- Softball
- Indoor Track
- Marching Band
- MCJROTC

== Notable alumni ==
- DaeSean Hamilton - Denver Broncos wide receiver
- Adin Huntington - Cleveland Browns defensive tackle
- Olumide Olamigoke - Olympian
- Robert Soderholm - American football long snapper
- Megan Baltzell, former collegiate All-American softball catcher
