= U.S. Route 13 in Virginia =

Segment of American highway

U.S. Route 13
- US 13 highlighted in red

Route information
- Maintained by VDOT and Chesapeake Bay Bridge and Tunnel Commission
- Length: 129.06 mi (207.70 km)
- Existed: 1926–present
- History: Established as SR 4 in 1918; Established as SR 34 in 1918
- Tourist routes: Virginia Byway
- Restrictions: No hazardous goods allowed on the Chesapeake Bay Bridge–Tunnel

Major junctions
- South end: US 13 at the North Carolina state line near Somerton
- US 58 in Suffolk; US 460 in Suffolk; I-64 / I-264 / I-664 in Chesapeake; US 17 in Chesapeake; I-464 in Chesapeake; I-264 in Norfolk; US 58 in Norfolk; I-64 in Norfolk; US 60 in Virginia Beach; SR 175 near Chincoteague
- North end: US 13 at the Maryland state line in New Church

Location
- Country: United States
- State: Virginia
- Counties: City of Suffolk, City of Chesapeake, City of Norfolk, City of Virginia Beach, Northampton, Accomack

Highway system
- United States Numbered Highway System; List; Special; Divided; Virginia Routes; Interstate; US; Primary; Secondary; Byways; History; HOT lanes
| ← US 11W | → SR 13 |

U.S. Route 13 (US 13) is a north–south United States Numbered Highway established in 1926 that runs for 518 miles (834 km) from Interstate 95 (I-95) just north of Fayetteville, North Carolina, north to US 1 in Morrisville, Pennsylvania, a northeastern suburb of Philadelphia. In the U.S. state of Virginia, US 13 runs north–south through the Hampton Roads and Eastern Shore regions of the state, using the Chesapeake Bay Bridge–Tunnel to get between the two. In the Hampton Roads area, it uses Military Highway to bypass the city centers. It is most usually a four-lane highway, sometimes up to freeway or expressway standards with controlled access.

== Route description ==
=== City of Suffolk ===
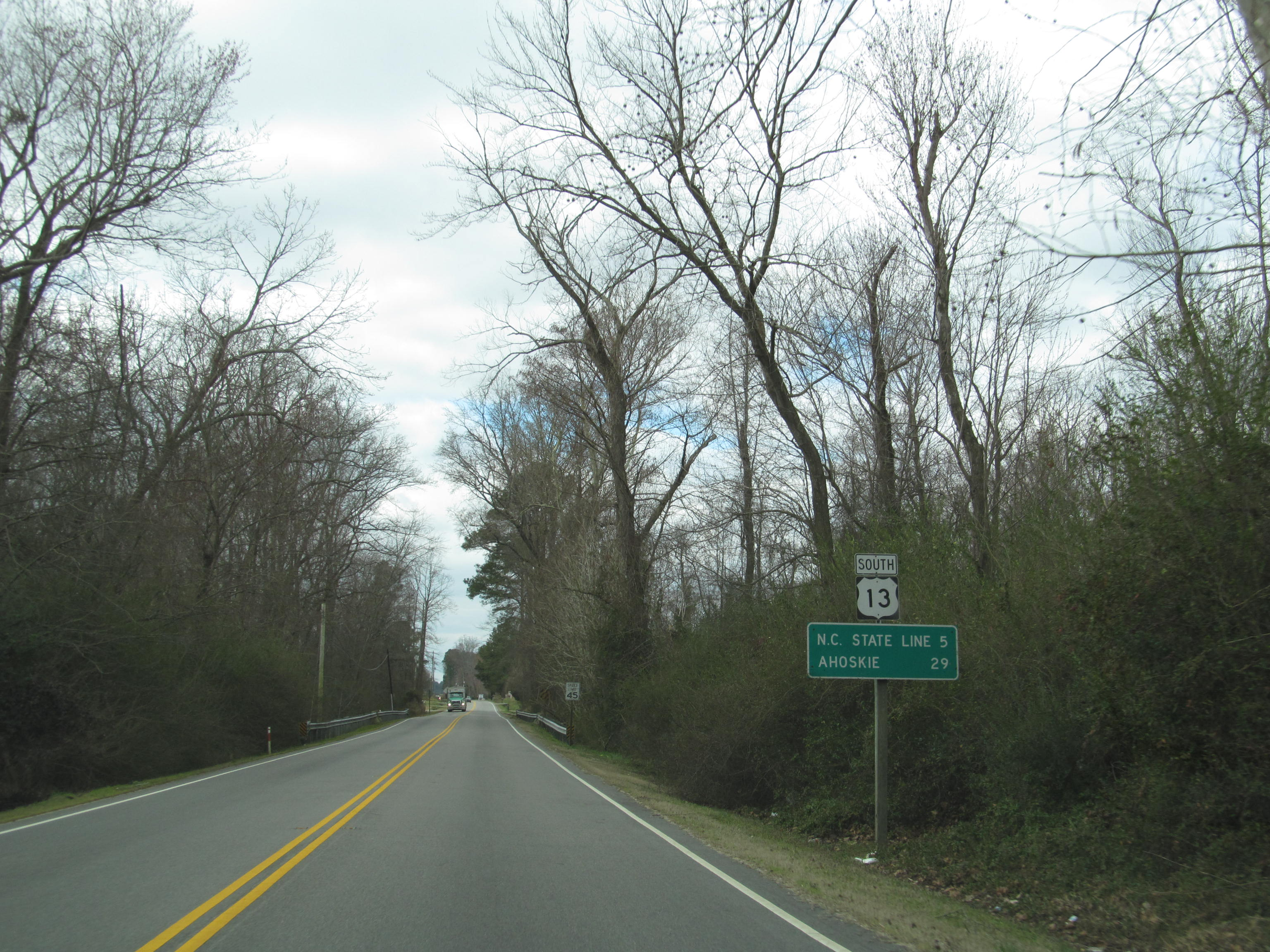
US 13 southbound along Whaleyville Boulevard in Suffolk

US 13 enters Virginia from North Carolina in the city of Suffolk in the Hampton Roads region, heading north on two-lane undivided Whaleyville Boulevard. The road passes through a mix of farmland and woodland with some residential and commercial development in the southern part of Suffolk, making a turn to the east in Somerton Historic District. The route curves northeast and reaches the community of Whaleyville, where it passes a mix of homes and businesses and crosses Mineral Spring Road. US 13 continues through wooded areas with some farm fields and residences, heading north before curving back to the northeast. Farther northeast, the road widens to a divided highway before it comes to an intersection with State Route 32 (SR 32). At this point, SR 32 joins US 13 for a concurrency on Carolina Road, a four-lane divided highway. The road runs through residential and commercial areas as it passes to the west of Suffolk Executive Airport. US 13/SR 32 head past more development and become a five-lane road with a center left-turn lane before turning back into a four-lane divided highway. US 13 splits from SR 32 at a modified trumpet interchange to head northwest on a four-lane freeway called the Suffolk Bypass while SR 32 continues north along with US 13 Business (US 13 Bus.) into the central part of Suffolk.

US 13 heads northwest on the freeway to bypass central Suffolk to the west, passing through wooded areas with nearby development and coming to a bridge over Norfolk Southern Railway's Franklin District railroad line. The route heads near residential development before it comes to a northbound exit and southbound entrance with SR 688. Immediately after this interchange, the freeway comes to an interchange with US 58 and the western terminus of US 58 Bus., at which point US 58 becomes concurrent with US 13 on the bypass of Suffolk. US 13/US 58 head northeast and come to a bridge over CSX Transportation's Portsmouth Subdivision railroad line and Norfolk Southern Railway's Norfolk District railroad line, passing through woodland. The freeway heads through a mix of fields and woods as it comes to a diamond interchange with SR 604. The roadway heads north and crosses Lake Meade before it curves northeast and comes to an interchange with US 460 and the western terminus of US 460 Bus. At this point, US 460 joins US 13 and US 58 on the bypass of Suffolk, which turns east and heads north of the central part of the city. The freeway reaches an interchange with SR 10/SR 32 and heads between residential neighborhoods to the north and woods to the south, coming to a bridge over the Nansemond River. After passing over the river, US 13/US 58/US 460 come to an interchange with SR 642 and pass over the Commonwealth Railway before running near more development and curving southeast. The freeway passes over SR 337 without an interchange before heading through woods and coming to a southbound exit and northbound entrance with US 13 Bus./US 58 Bus./US 460 Bus. that also features a U-turn ramp from the southbound lanes to the northbound lanes by way of the southbound exit. This interchange features several unfinished ghost ramps which aim toward US 13 Bus./US 58 Bus./US 460 Bus. At this point, the freeway ends and US 13/US 58/US 460 head east-northeast on Portsmouth Boulevard, a six-lane expressway-style divided highway that passes through dense forests at the northern edge of the Great Dismal Swamp, with CSX Transportation's Portsmouth Subdivision parallel a short distance to the south. In this area, the roadway passes a pair of weigh stations serving both sides of the road.

=== City of Chesapeake ===
Along this stretch, US 13/US 58/US 460 cross into the city of Chesapeake and continue through wooded areas with some commercial development, passing to the south of Hampton Roads Executive Airport. The road comes to the Bowers Hill Interchange, an interchange complex serving the three routes along with I-64, I-264, and I-664. At this interchange, the road meets I-664, which is part of the Hampton Roads Beltway. Here, northbound US 13 and eastbound US 460 split from US 58 and follow I-664 south to the next exit, where the two routes split from I-664 and follow South Military Highway. Southbound US 13 and westbound US 460 remain along US 58 before splitting south toward South Military Highway at an intersection with the southern terminus of SR 191, at which point US 58 continues northeast along with US 460 Alternate. From here, US 13/US 460 cross the CSX Transportation line and continue east along South Military Highway, which is a four-lane divided highway. The road passes homes and businesses in the community of Bower's Hill, curving southeast into wooded areas and coming to a bridge over an abandoned railroad grade. The two routes continue past commercial development with some homes and woodland, turning to the east and coming to an interchange with I-64 (Hampton Roads Beltway). Past this interchange, US 13/US 460 pass through forests with some commercial development before reaching a junction with US 17 with long right-turn ramps. The road heads east through business areas with nearby residential development, intersecting the eastern terminus of SR 196. The two routes head into industrial areas with some trees and become closely parallel with Norfolk Southern Railway's Norfolk District to the south.

US 13/US 460 cross over the Southern Branch Elizabeth River on the Gilmerton Bridge, a vertical-lift bridge, with the railroad tracks crossing the river on a parallel drawbridge. Past the bridge, the road passes more industrial development and crosses a Norfolk and Portsmouth Belt Line Railroad line before coming to an interchange with SR 166, where US 460 splits from US 13 by heading north along SR 166. Within this interchange, the road passes over the Norfolk Southern line. Following this interchange, US 13 continues east-southeast along four-lane divided South Military Highway, passing through industrial areas and meeting I-464 at a diamond interchange. After I-464, the road curves northeast and passes commercial development before coming to a cloverleaf interchange with SR 168. Past this interchange, the route comes to a bridge over the Chesapeake and Albemarle Railroad and is lined with businesses as it continues northeast.

=== Cities of Norfolk and Virginia Beach ===
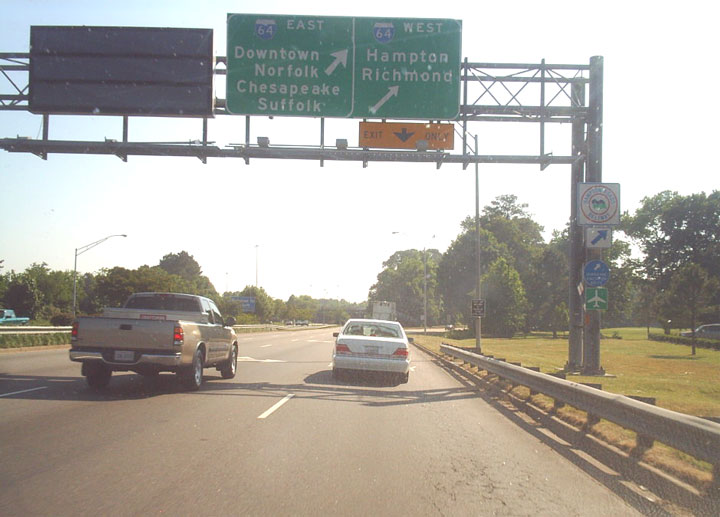
US 13/SR 166 southbound at the I-64 interchange in Norfolk

US 13 enters the city of Virginia Beach and heads through more business areas, widening to six lanes and crossing Providence and Indian River roads. Past the latter intersection, the road widens to eight lanes and curves to the north, passing between residential areas to the west and commercial development to the east. The route comes to a bridge over the Eastern Branch Elizabeth River, at which point it enters the city of Norfolk and runs near homes before passing commercial development. US 13 passes over Hampton Roads Transit's Tide Light Rail line east of Military Highway station before it comes to a cloverleaf interchange with I-264. Following this interchange, the road name becomes North Military Highway and the divided highway widens to 10 lanes. The route becomes lined with businesses, passing to the west of the former Military Circle Mall before reaching a single-point urban interchange with US 58. From here, US 13 narrows to eight lanes and continues past businesses and shopping centers. The route narrows to a four-lane undivided road as it continues north.

US 13 reaches an intersection with SR 165 and SR 166, where SR 165 heads north along North Military Highway, SR 166 heads west along Princess Anne Road, and US 13 turns east to run concurrent with SR 165 and SR 166 along Northampton Boulevard, a six-lane divided highway. The road passes near residential and commercial development, with SR 165 soon splitting to the south. US 13/SR 166 continue east through wooded areas and reach an interchange with I-64 (Hampton Roads Beltway). Past this interchange, the divided highway turns northeast and widens to eight lanes, passing to the southeast of the entrance to Norfolk Premium Outlets before crossing into the city of Virginia Beach. The two routes head past more businesses with some homes, with SR 166 splitting from US 13 by turning north at Diamond Springs Road. US 13 narrows to six lanes and curves east, heading through wooded residential areas and passing between Little Creek Reservoir to the north and Lake Smith to the south. The road continues near residential development and comes to a cloverleaf interchange with SR 225. Following this, the route curves northeast and reaches a diamond interchange with US 60, where it turns to the north and narrows to four lanes, passing between residential neighborhoods.

=== Chesapeake Bay Bridge–Tunnel ===
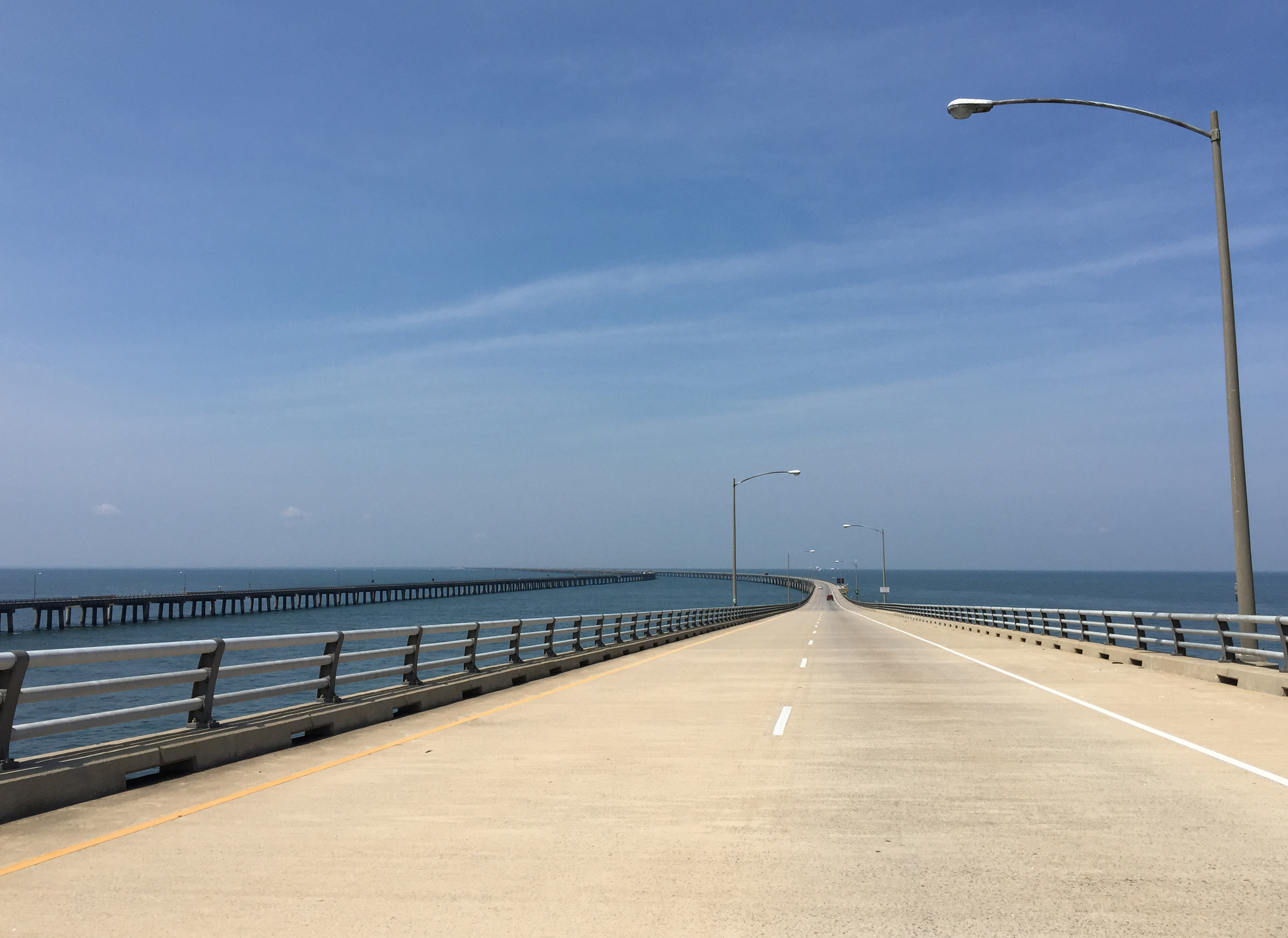
The Chesapeake Bay Bridge–Tunnel carries US 13 across the Chesapeake Bay

A short distance past the US 60 interchange, US 13 comes to a northbound toll plaza for the Chesapeake Bay Bridge–Tunnel. From here, the route heads onto the Chesapeake Bay Bridge–Tunnel, a 17.6-mile (28.3 km) bridge–tunnel complex that carries US 13 across the Chesapeake Bay. The road leaves the mainland of Virginia Beach and heads over the bay on a pair of low-level trestle bridges, with one bridge carrying two lanes of northbound traffic and the other bridge carrying two lanes of southbound traffic. The road reaches an artificial island that is home to a fishing pier, where it narrows to a two-lane undivided road and heads into the Thimble Shoal Tunnel that passes under a shipping channel. The roadway leaves the tunnel at another artificial island, at which point it resumes along a pair of low-level trestle bridges carrying two lanes in each direction. The bridge–tunnel curves northeast and reaches another artificial island, where the highway again narrows to a two-lane undivided road and enters the Chesapeake Channel Tunnel that heads under another shipping channel. The road leaves the tunnel on another artificial island and returns to a pair of low-level trestle bridges carrying two lanes in each direction. Farther northeast, the roadway rises for the North Channel Bridges, a high-level crossing of a shipping channel. The northbound span at the North Channel Bridges consists of a truss bridge. After this, the road heads onto Fisherman Island, an island in the Chesapeake Bay in Northampton County that contains the Fisherman Island National Wildlife Refuge. On this island, US 13 heads off the bridge and turns north as a four-lane divided highway. The roadway leaves the island and heads north across more of the Chesapeake Bay on the Fisherman Inlet Bridges, a pair of high-level bridges over a shipping channel that carry two lanes in each direction. After this, the route heads onto the mainland of Northampton County and passes a scenic overlook next to the southbound lanes before coming to a southbound toll plaza for the Chesapeake Bay Bridge–Tunnel and a rest area and welcome center next to the northbound lanes that is accessible from both directions.

=== Northampton County ===
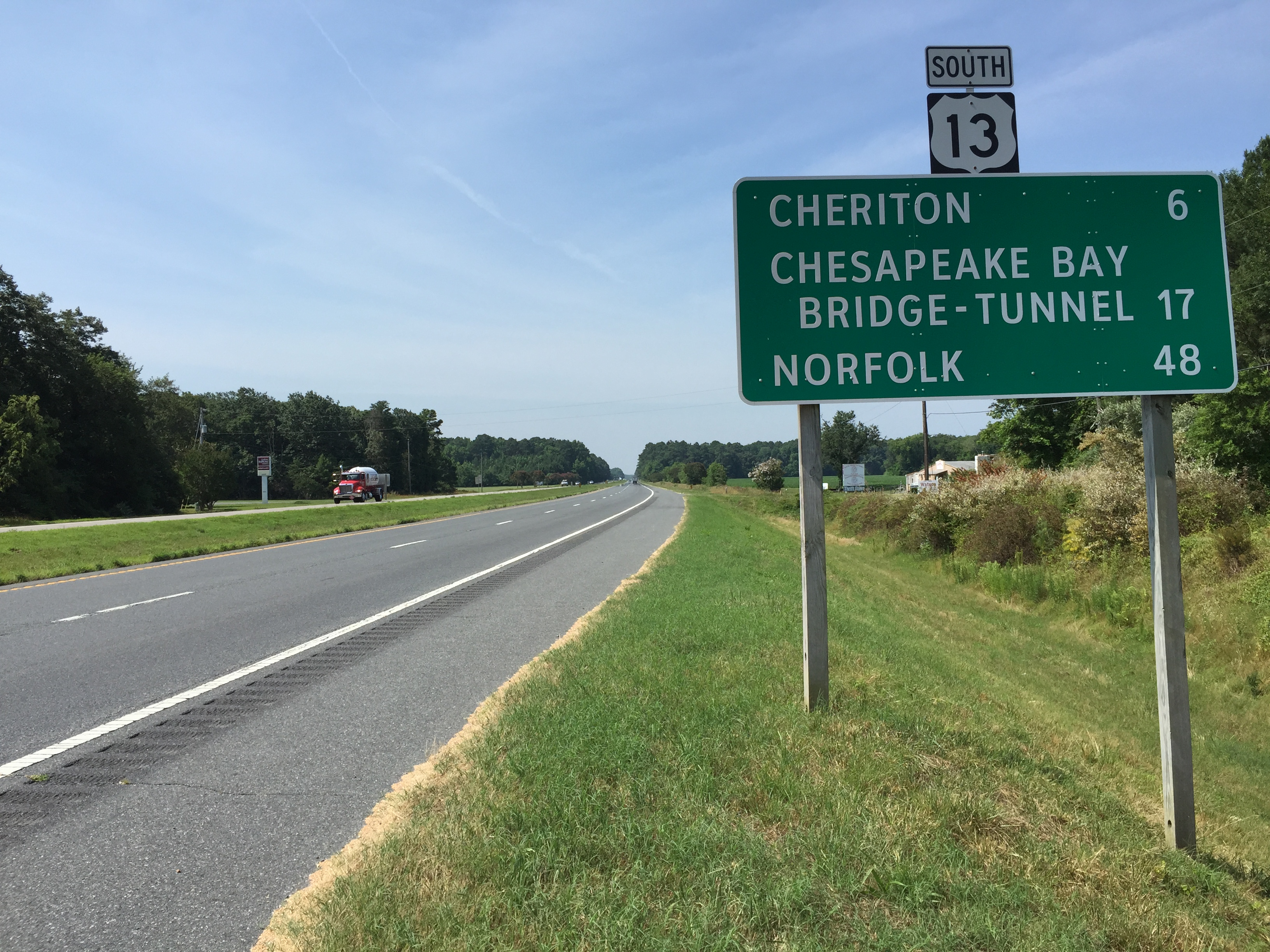
View south along US 13 at US 13 Bus. near Eastville in Northampton County

From here, US 13 leaves the Chesapeake Bay Bridge–Tunnel and continues through Northampton County, which is in the Eastern Shore region of the state on the Delmarva Peninsula. The route heads north on the Charles M. Lankford Jr. Highway (usually shortened to Lankford Highway), a four-lane divided highway that serves as the main north–south highway in the region. The road intersects the southern terminus of SR 600 west of the Eastern Shore of Virginia National Wildlife Refuge and runs through a mix of farmland and woodland with some residential and commercial development a short distance to the east of the Chesapeake Bay. US 13 passes to the east of Kiptopeke State Park, heading farther east from the bay, and comes to an intersection with SR 704 that provides access to the community of Kiptopeke and the state park to the west. The route continues north through rural areas with some development, coming to an intersection with SR 683. Farther north, the road crosses the abandoned Bay Coast Railroad line and comes to an intersection with the eastern terminus of SR 184, which heads west to the town of Cape Charles, and the southern terminus of US 13 Bus., which heads north to the town of Cheriton. From here, US 13 heads north-northwest and runs through farm fields with some businesses as it bypasses Cheriton to the west, curving to the northeast. The route meets the northern end of US 13 Bus. to the north of Cheriton and continues through agricultural areas and woodland with some development. Another US 13 Bus. branches off to the northwest to head into the town of Eastville while US 13 bypasses the town to the east. The road comes to the north end of US 13 Bus. past Eastville as it runs north-northeast through more rural areas.

The road curves northeast before turning back to the north-northeast as it reaches the community of Machipongo, where it begins to run closely parallel to the abandoned railroad line to the east of the road. US 13 continues alongside the abandoned railroad tracks through farms and woods with some homes. The route reaches the community of Birdsnest, where it crosses SR 620. The road runs through more rural land before it enters the town of Nassawadox, where it heads near homes and some businesses and comes to intersections with SR 609 and SR 606. US 13 leaves Nassawadox and runs through wooded areas with some farm fields and development. South of the town of Exmore, the route comes to an intersection with the southern terminus of US 13 Bus., which heads northeast alongside the abandoned railroad tracks into Exmore while US 13 curves north to bypass the town to the west. The road heads past businesses with some fields and woods and reaches an intersection with SR 183. From here, US 13 curves northeast and crosses SR 178, where it turns east and runs between woodland to the north and businesses to the south. The route comes to the northern terminus of US 13 Bus. and curves northeast into woods.

=== Accomack County ===
US 13 enters Accomack County and heads north-northeast through a mix of fields, woods, and commercial development as the abandoned Bay Coast Railroad line again closely parallels the route to the east. The route reaches an intersection with the eastern terminus of SR 181, which leads west to the town of Belle Haven. The road continues alongside the abandoned railroad tracks through forests before heading through farmland with some residential and commercial development. US 13 enters the town of Painter, where it transitions into a five-lane road with a center left-turn lane and passes near a mix of homes and businesses, reaching an intersection with the western terminus of SR 182. After leaving Painter, the route becomes a four-lane divided highway again and continues through a mix of farm fields and woodland with some development. The road reaches the town of Keller, where the median turns into a center left-turn lane and it heads near businesses, coming to a junction with SR 180. At this point, SR 180 turns north for a concurrency with US 13 and the two routes leave Keller, transitioning into a four-lane divided highway. SR 180 splits from US 13 by turning east and US 13 continues north-northeast through woods alongside the abandoned railroad tracks. The road intersects SR 1420, which leads west to Accomack County Airport, adjacent to the Eastern Shore of Virginia Chamber of Commerce tourist information center before it passes to the east of Eastern Shore Community College, which is accessed by SR 389. The route runs through more woods before it reaches the town of Melfa, where it becomes a five-lane road with a center left-turn lane and passes a mix of homes and businesses, crossing SR 626. After leaving Melfa, US 13 turns back into a four-lane divided highway and passes through a mix of farmland, woodland, and development.

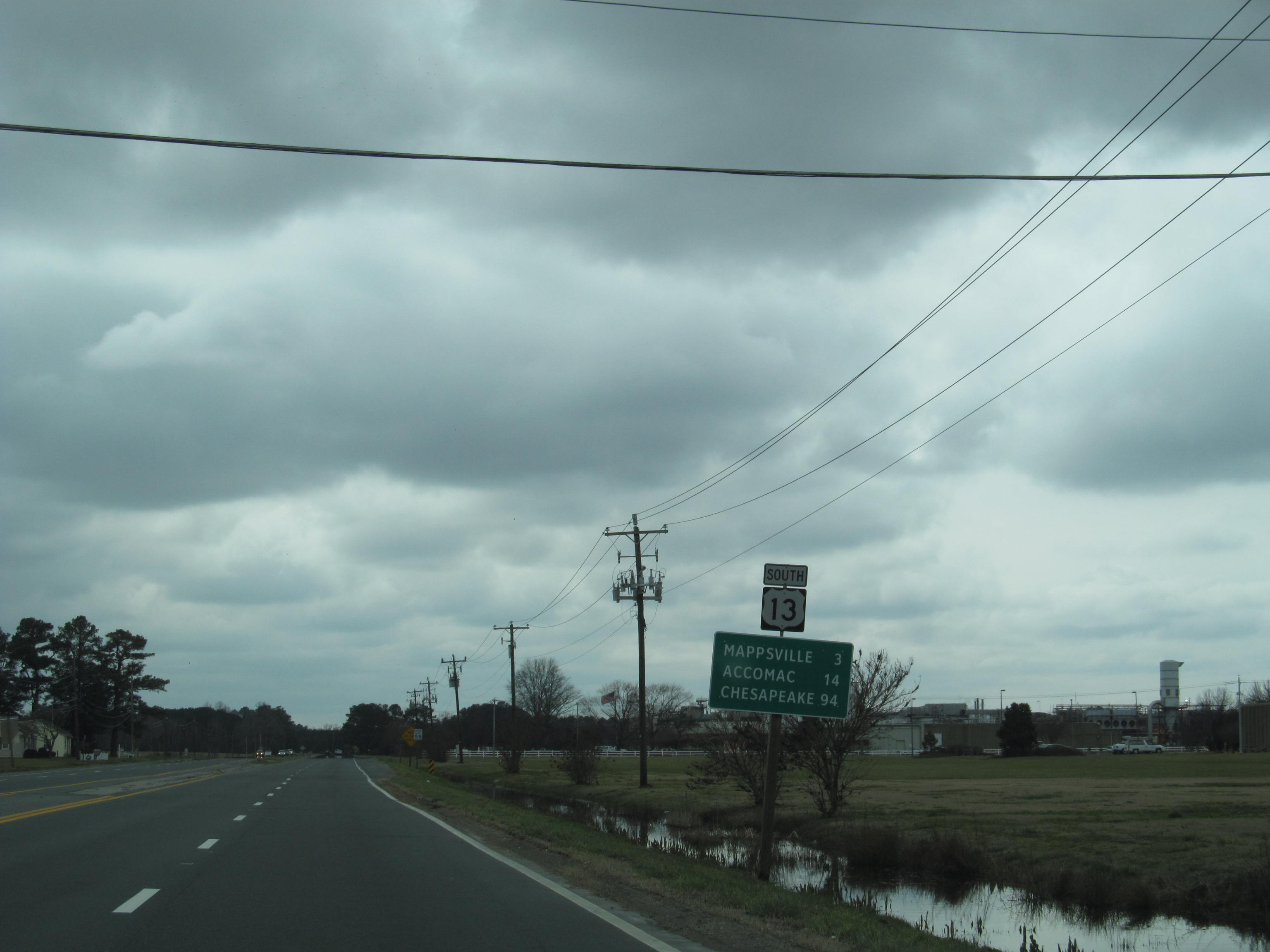
US 13 southbound leaving Temperanceville in Accomack County

South of the town of Onley, the road passes to the east of Nandua High School as it curves north away from the abandoned railroad tracks. The route heads past businesses and comes to an intersection with the southern terminus of US 13 Bus., which heads east into Onley. US 13 continues through commercial areas along the western edge of Onley, curving northeast and crossing SR 179. The road comes to an interchange with US 13 Bus. north of Onley and heads onto a bridge over the business route and the abandoned railroad line. The route continues northeast through fields and woods with some commercial development, passing to the southeast of the community of Tasley. US 13 reaches an intersection with US 13 Bus. and continues through rural land with occasional development as it bypasses the town of Accomac to the northwest. The road passes south of a Perdue Farms chicken plant before meeting the northern terminus of US 13 Bus. to the northeast of Accomac. From here, the route continues northeast through agricultural areas with some woods, homes, and commercial development. In the community of Centerville, US 13 comes to an intersection with the eastern terminus of SR 176. A short distance later, the road has a junction with the southern terminus of SR 679. The route runs north-northeast through farmland with some woodland and occasional development, passing through the community of Gargatha. In the community of Nelsonia, US 13 becomes a five-lane road with a center left-turn lane and runs past homes and businesses, reaching an intersection with SR 187. From here, the route turns back into a four-lane divided highway and runs through a mix of farmfields and woodland. Upon reaching the community of Mappsville, the median of the road turns into a center left-turn lane and it runs near residences and commercial development, forming a brief concurrency with SR 689.

After passing through Mappsville, US 13 runs through farmland and becomes a four-lane divided highway past the SR 691 junction. The road curves to the north and continues through farmfields and woodland with some development, coming to an intersection with the eastern terminus of SR 692. The route bends to the north-northeast and passes east of a Tyson Foods chicken plant before it reaches the community of Temperanceville, where it transitions into a five-lane road with a center left-turn lane and is lined with homes and some businesses, curving north and crossing SR 695. From here, US 13 once again becomes a four-lane divided highway and continues through a mix of agricultural and wooded areas, passing to the east of Arcadia High School. At this point, the road heads into the community of Oak Hall and the median turns into a center left-turn lane as it passes through residential areas. The route turns back into a four-lane divided highway as it runs past businesses and comes to an intersection with the western terminus of SR 175, which heads east to the town of Chincoteague and Assateague Island. Past this intersection, US 13 runs through a mix of farmfield and woodland with some development. The route passes a pair of weigh stations located on both sides of the road and runs through the community of New Church, where it heads past a mix of homes and businesses and intersects SR 709. From here, the road curves northwest and passes through wooded areas, reaching a rest area and welcome center next to the southbound lanes that is accessible from both directions. US 13 heads past farm fields and businesses before coming to the Maryland state line and continuing north into that state.

== History ==
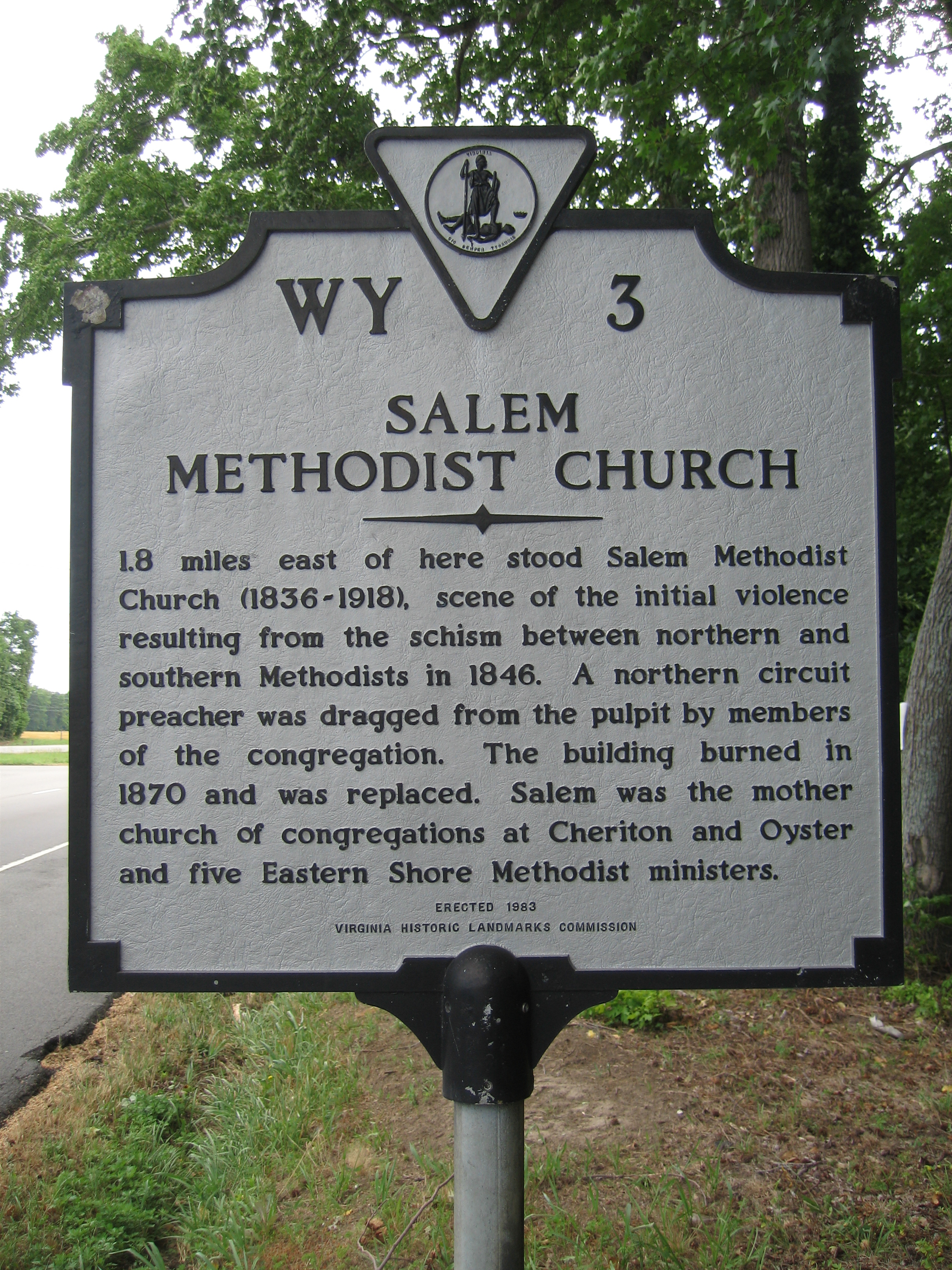
Salem Methodist Church historical marker near Cheriton

What is now US 13 on the Eastern Shore was added to the state highway system in 1918 as State Route 4 (SR 4). It was renumbered State Route 34 (SR 34) in the 1923 state highway renumbering, and US 13 was applied to its whole length in 1926. SR 34 was dropped in the 1933 state route renumbering and was immediately reused on a route through Lawrenceville. That was renumbered to SR 46 in the 1940 state highway renumbering, and the current SR 34 was designated in the late 1940s.

Before the Chesapeake Bay Bridge–Tunnel, US 13 continued across the Chesapeake Bay using a ferry.

== Future ==
As part of the Suffolk 2026 Comprehensive Plan, the city plans to bypass the crossroads community of Whaleyville in southwestern Suffolk City. US 13 (along with North Carolina Highway 11) is a strategic highway corridor in North Carolina toward Greenville.

== Major intersections ==
| County | Location | mi | km | Destinations | Notes |
|---|---|---|---|---|---|
| City of Suffolk | | 0.00 | 0.00 | US 13 south – Ahoskie | North Carolina state line |
| City of Suffolk | | 0.94 | 1.51 | Arthur Drive – Somerton | Former SR 643 |
| City of Suffolk | | 4.75 | 7.64 | Mineral Spring Road – Holland | Former SR 616 |
| City of Suffolk | | 11.80 | 18.99 | SR 32 south (Carolina Road) – Edenton, Great Dismal Swamp National Wildlife Refuge | South end of SR 32 overlap |
| City of Suffolk | | 11.91 | 19.17 | Old Somerton Road / Airport Road – Suffolk Municipal Airport | Former SR 646 |
| City of Suffolk | | 13.16 | 21.18 | US 13 Bus. north / SR 32 north (Carolina Road) – Downtown Suffolk | Interchange; north end of SR 32 overlap; south end of freeway |
| City of Suffolk | | | | SR 688 (Turlington Road) to US 58 Bus. – Downtown Suffolk | Northbound exit and southbound entrance |
| City of Suffolk | | 15.41 | 24.80 | US 58 west – Franklin, Emporia | South end of US 58 overlap |
| City of Suffolk | | 16.91 | 27.21 | SR 604 (Pitchkettle Road) | |
| City of Suffolk | | 18.35 | 29.53 | US 460 west (US 460 Bus. east) – Petersburg, Downtown Suffolk | South end of US 460 overlap |
| City of Suffolk | | 19.23 | 30.95 | SR 10 / SR 32 – Smithfield, Newport News, Downtown Suffolk | |
| City of Suffolk | | 20.85 | 33.55 | SR 642 (Wilroy Road) | |
| City of Suffolk | | 22.53 | 36.26 | US 13 Bus. south / US 58 Bus. west / US 460 Bus. west – Downtown Suffolk | Interchange; southbound exit and northbound entrance; north end of freeway |
| City of Chesapeake | | 27.97 | 45.01 | I-664 north (Hampton Roads Beltway inner loop) / US 58 east / US 460 Alt. east (Airline Boulevard) / SR 191 north (Jolliff Road) – Newport News, Hampton, Richmond | I-664 exit 13; north end of US 58 overlap; south end of I-664 overlap (northbound only) |
| City of Chesapeake | | | | West Military Highway | Interchange northbound; intersection southbound |
| City of Chesapeake | | | | I-264 east / I-64 (Hampton Roads Beltway outer loop) – Portsmouth, Norfolk, Chesapeake, Virginia Beach | North end of I-664 overlap (northbound only); US 13 north follows exit 14 |
| City of Chesapeake | | 30.97 | 49.84 | I-64 to I-664 – Suffolk, Virginia Beach | I-64 exit 297 |
| City of Chesapeake | | 32.03 | 51.55 | US 17 (North George Washington Highway) to I-64 – Portsmouth, Elizabeth City, NC | |
| City of Chesapeake | | | | SR 196 west (Canal Drive) | |
| City of Chesapeake | | | | Gilmerton Bridge over Southern Branch Elizabeth River | |
| City of Chesapeake | | 34.84 | 56.07 | US 460 east / SR 166 (Bainbridge Boulevard) – South Norfolk | Interchange; east end of US 460 overlap |
| City of Chesapeake | | 35.64 | 57.36 | I-464 to I-64 / I-264 / US 17 south – Norfolk, Virginia Beach | I-464 exit 2 |
| City of Chesapeake | | 36.70 | 59.06 | SR 168 (Battlefield Boulevard) to I-64 – Great Bridge, Nags Head | Interchange |
| City of Virginia Beach | | 39.39 | 63.39 | Providence Road | Former SR 409 east |
| City of Virginia Beach | | 39.82 | 64.08 | Indian River Road | Former SR 407 |
| City of Norfolk | | 41.44 | 66.69 | I-264 to I-64 – Downtown Norfolk, Portsmouth, Richmond, Virginia Beach | I-264 exit 13 |
| City of Norfolk | | 42.19 | 67.90 | US 58 (Virginia Beach Boulevard) | Interchange |
| City of Norfolk | | 43.51 | 70.02 | SR 165 north (North Military Highway) / SR 166 west (Princess Anne Road) to I-64 east – Airport, Downtown Norfolk | South end of SR 165 / SR 166 overlap |
| City of Norfolk | | 43.76 | 70.42 | SR 165 south (Kempsville Road) | North end of SR 165 overlap |
| City of Norfolk | | 44.26 | 71.23 | I-64 (Hampton Roads Beltway) – Hampton, Richmond, Downtown Norfolk, Chesapeake, Suffolk | I-64 exit 282; no access from US 13 north to I-64 west or I-64 east to US 13 south |
| City of Virginia Beach | | 45.44 | 73.13 | SR 166 east (Diamond Springs Road) | North end of SR 166 overlap |
| City of Virginia Beach | | 47.32 | 76.15 | SR 225 (Independence Boulevard) – Amphib Base | Interchange |
| City of Virginia Beach | | 48.20 | 77.57 | US 60 (Shore Drive) – Little Creek, Virginia Beach, Beaches | Interchange |
| Chesapeake Bay | | 49.26 | 79.28 | Chesapeake Bay Bridge–Tunnel | |
| Northampton | Kiptopeke | | | SR 600 (Seaside Road) | Former SR 186 north |
| Northampton | | | | SR 624 (Capeville Drive) – Capeville | Former SR 186 south |
| Northampton | Cape Junction | 75.53 | 121.55 | US 13 Bus. north (Bayside Road) / SR 184 west (Stone Road) – Cape Charles, Cheriton | |
| Northampton | Cheriton | 77.09 | 124.06 | US 13 Bus. south (Bayside Road) – Cheriton | |
| Northampton | Stumptown | 80.00 | 128.75 | US 13 Bus. north (Courthouse Road) – Eastville | |
| Northampton | Eastville | 81.30 | 130.84 | SR 631 (Willow Oak Road) – Eastville | Former SR 185 east |
| Northampton | | 82.11 | 132.14 | US 13 Bus. south (Courthouse Road) – Eastville | |
| Northampton | Nassawadox | | | SR 606 (Rogers Drive) – Franktown | Former SR 184 west |
| Northampton | Exmore | 92.97 | 149.62 | US 13 Bus. north (Main Street) – Exmore, Willis Wharf | |
| Northampton | Exmore | 94.47 | 152.03 | SR 183 (Occohannock Neck Road) – Silver Beach, Downtown Exmore | |
| Northampton | Exmore | 94.91 | 152.74 | SR 178 (Main Street) – Belle Haven, Downtown Exmore, Willis Wharf | |
| Northampton | Exmore | 95.22 | 153.24 | Lincoln Avenue (US 13 Bus. south) | |
| Accomack | Belle Haven Station | | | SR 181 west – Belle Haven | |
| Accomack | Painter | | | SR 182 east (Main Street) – Quinby | |
| Accomack | Keller | | | SR 180 west (North Street) / SR 696 east (Keller Fair Road) – Pungoteague | South end of SR 180 overlap |
| Accomack | Keller | | | SR 180 east (Wachapreague Road) – Wachapreague | North end of SR 180 overlap |
| Accomack | | | | SR 389 west – Eastern Shore Community College | |
| Accomack | Onley | 105.71 | 170.12 | US 13 Bus. north (Coastal Boulevard) / SR 609 west (Redwood Road) – Onley | |
| Accomack | Onley | 106.33 | 171.12 | SR 179 (West Main Street) – Onancock, Onley | |
| Accomack | | | | US 13 Bus. – Tasley | Interchange |
| Accomack | | 108.14 | 174.03 | US 13 Bus. (Tasley Road / Front Street) – Accomac | |
| Accomack | Accomac | | | SR 764 (Accomac Road / Courthouse Avenue) – Greenbush, Accomac | Former SR 177 |
| Accomack | | 110.42 | 177.70 | US 13 Bus. south (Front Street) / SR 663 west (Mary N. Smith Road) – Accomac | |
| Accomack | Centerville | 112.36 | 180.83 | SR 176 west (Parksley Road) – Parksley | |
| Accomack | Nelsonia | 116.66 | 187.75 | SR 187 (Nelsonia Road) – Bloxom, Modest Town | |
| Accomack | | | | SR 692 west (Hallwood Road) – Hallwood | |
| Accomack | Temperanceville | 122.07 | 196.45 | SR 695 west (Saxis Road) – Saxis, Makemie Park, Sanford | Former SR 288 west |
| Accomack | Oak Hall | | | SR 703 (Withams Road) | Former SR 175 west |
| Accomack | Nash Corner | 125.38 | 201.78 | SR 175 east (Chincoteague Road) – Wallops Island, Chincoteague, Assateague | |
| Accomack | | 129.06 | 207.70 | US 13 north (Ocean Highway) – Salisbury | Maryland state line |
1.000 mi = 1.609 km; 1.000 km = 0.621 mi: Concurrency terminus; Incomplete access; Tolled

== See also ==
- Virginia State Route 13
- State Route 341, Centerville west to Parksley, now SR 176
- State Route 342, Tasley west to Onancock, now SR 126
- State Route 343, Eastville east to the Eastern Shore Railroad, now part of SR 631

U.S. Route 13
| Previous state: North Carolina | Virginia | Next state: Maryland |
