= Virginia State Route 316 =

State highway in Accomack County, Virginia, US

State Route 316

Route information
- Maintained by VDOT
- Length: 9.49 mi (15.27 km)
- Existed: 1937–present

Major junctions
- South end: US 13 Bus. / SR 126 at Tasley
- SR 176 / SR 673 in Parksley
- North end: SR 187 / SR 779 in Bloxom

Location
- Country: United States
- State: Virginia
- Counties: Accomack

Highway system
- Virginia Routes; Interstate; US; Primary; Secondary; Byways; History; HOT lanes
← SR 315	→ SR 317

State Route 316 (SR 316) is a primary state highway in the U.S. state of Virginia. The state highway runs 9.49 miles (15.27 km) from U.S. Route 13 Business (US 13 Business) at Tasley north to SR 187 in Bloxom. SR 316 parallels an inactive railroad line as it connects the central Accomack County towns of Accomac, Onley, and Onancock with the northern county towns of Parksley, Bloxom, and Hallwood.

== Route description ==
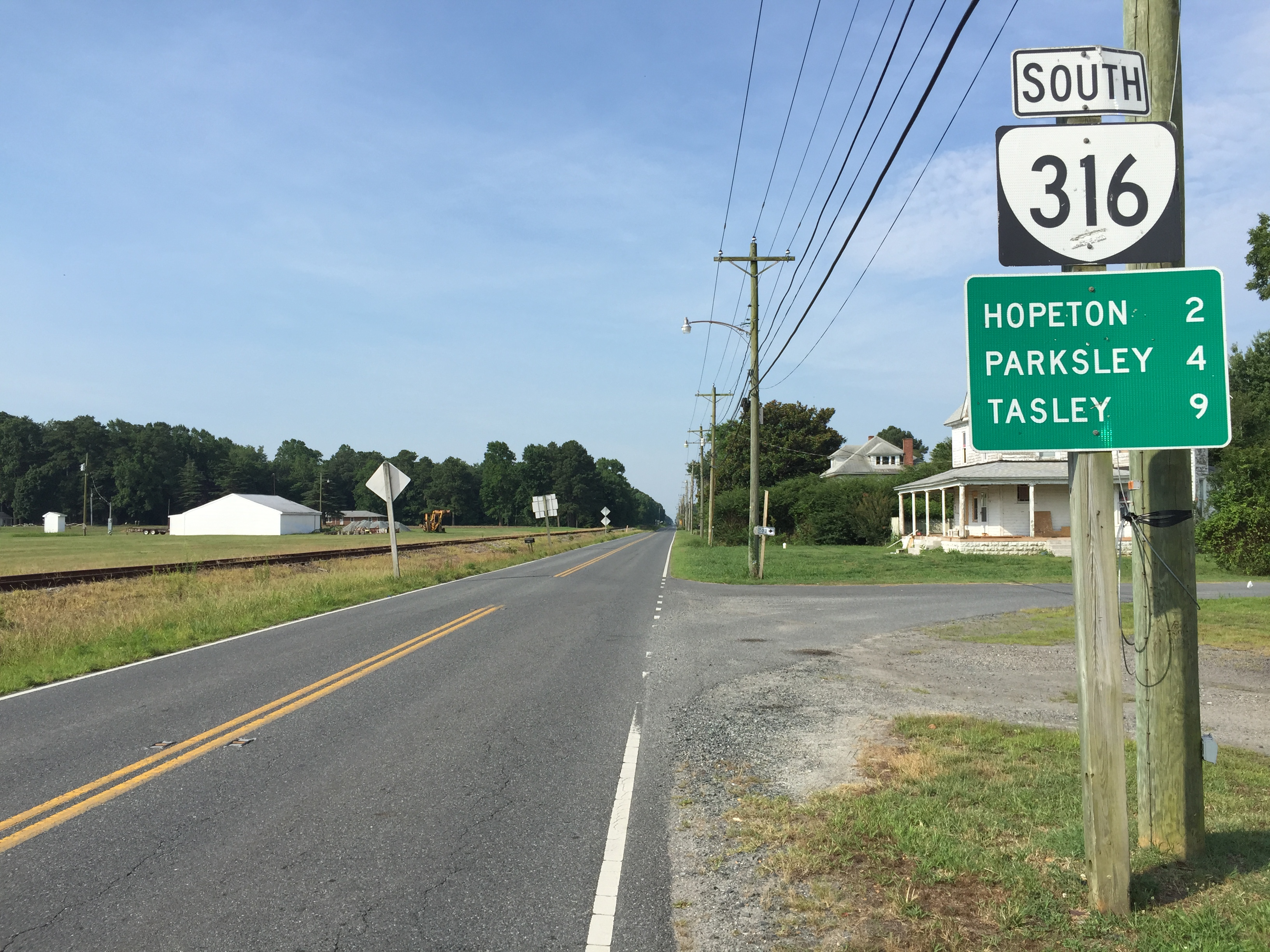
View south along SR 316 at SR T-2503 in Bloxom

SR 316 begins at a roundabout with US 13 Business and SR 126 in the hamlet of Tasley. US 13 Business heads east as Tasley Road toward Accomac and south toward Onley as Coastal Boulevard, both of which intersect US 13; SR 126 heads west as Fairgrounds Road toward Onancock. SR 316 heads north as two-lane undivided Greenbush Road and begins to closely parallel an inactive railroad line. The state highway passes through Greenbush and Chase Crossing before entering the town of Parksley as Cassatt Avenue. One block north of the town line, SR 316 intersects Bennett Street, which heads east as SR 176 and provides access to the Eastern Shore Railway Museum on the east side the railroad. The state highway leaves Parksley as Hopeton Road and passes through the village of Hopeton on its way to Bloxom. SR 316 enters the town as Bayside Drive and reaches its northern terminus at SR 187 (Shoremain Drive). Bayside Drive continues north as SR 779 toward the town of Hallwood.

== Major intersections ==
The entire route is in Accomack County.

Location	mi	km	Destinations	Notes
Tasley	0.00	0.00	US 13 Bus. (Tasley Road/Coastal Boulevard) / SR 126 west (Fairgrounds Road) – Onley, Accomac, Onancock	Roundabout; southern terminus
Parksley	5.81	9.35	SR 176 east (Bennett Street) / SR 673 west (Bennett Street) – Metompkin	
Bloxom	9.49	15.27	SR 187 (Shoremain Drive) / SR 779 north (Bayside Drive) – Guilford, Modest Town, Hallwood	Northern terminus
1.000 mi = 1.609 km; 1.000 km = 0.621 mi
