= Virginia State Route 126 =

State highway in Accomack County, Virginia, US

State Route 126
- Fairgrounds Road

Route information
- Maintained by VDOT
- Length: 1.38 mi (2.22 km)
- Tourist routes: Virginia Byway

Major junctions
- West end: SR 179 in Onancock
- East end: US 13 Bus. / SR 316 at Tasley

Location
- Country: United States
- State: Virginia
- Counties: Accomack

Highway system
- Virginia Routes; Interstate; US; Primary; Secondary; Byways; History; HOT lanes
← SR 125	→ SR 127

State Route 126 (SR 126) is a primary state highway in the U.S. state of Virginia. Known as Fairgrounds Road, the state highway runs 1.38 miles (2.22 km) from SR 179 in Onancock east to U.S. Route 13 Business (US 13 Business) and SR 316 at Tasley.

== Route description ==
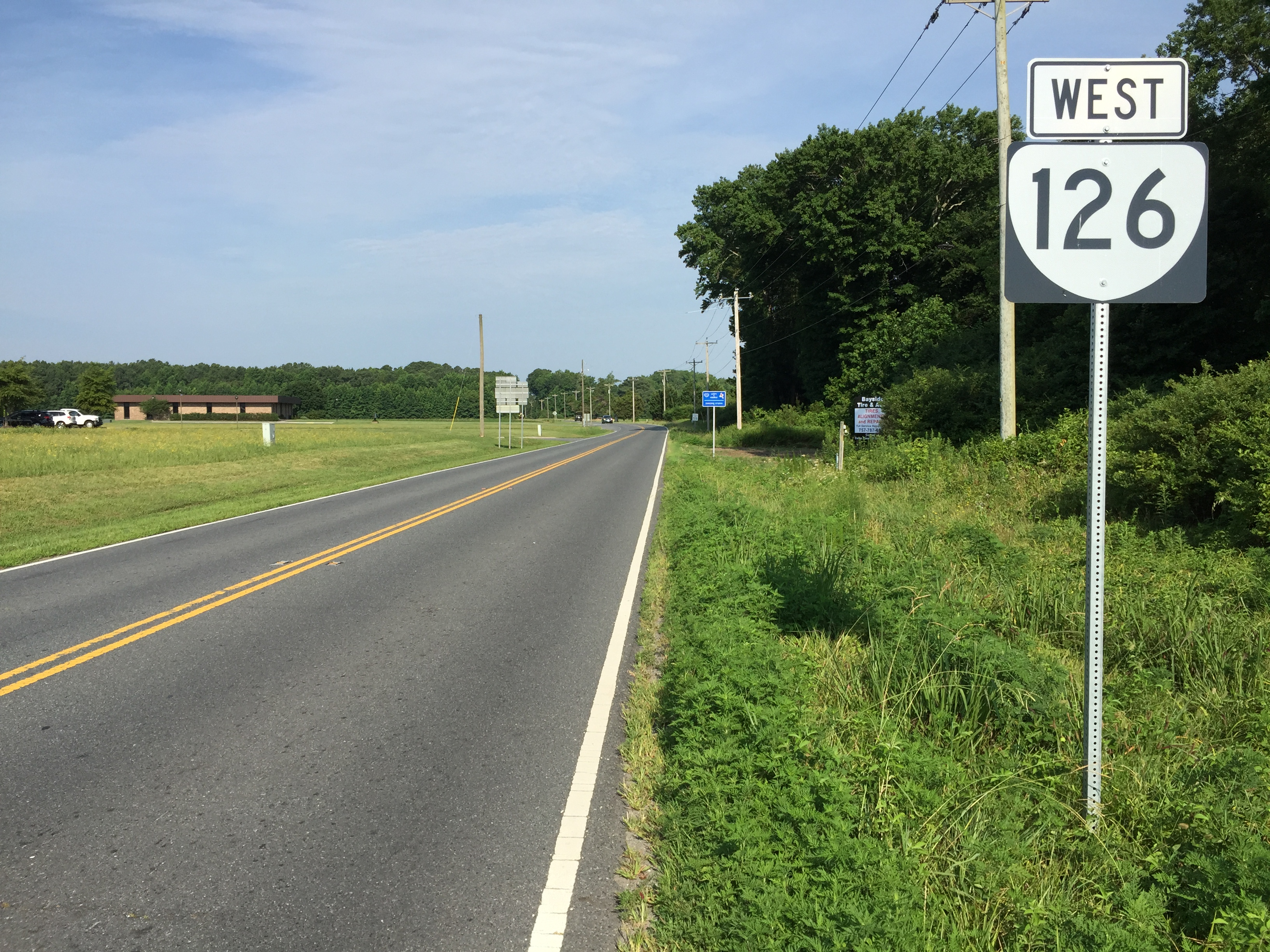
View west along SR 126 near US 13 Bus. and SR 316 in Tasley

SR 126 begins at an intersection with SR 179 (Market Street) in the town of Onancock. The state highway heads east as a two-lane undivided road and leaves the town of Onancock by crossing the North Branch of Onancock Creek. SR 126 reaches its eastern terminus as the west leg of a roundabout in Tasley. SR 316 heads north as Greenbush Road toward Greenbush; US 13 Business heads east (north) as Tasley Road toward Accomac, the county seat of Accomack County, and south as Coastal Boulevard toward Onley.

== Major intersections ==
The entire route is in Accomack County.

Location	mi	km	Destinations	Notes
Onancock	0.00	0.00	SR 179 (Market Street) – Onley	Western terminus
Tasley	1.38	2.22	US 13 Bus. (Coastal Boulevard/Tasley Road) / SR 316 north (Greenbush Road) – Accomac, Parksley	Roundabout; eastern terminus
1.000 mi = 1.609 km; 1.000 km = 0.621 mi

< SR 341	Spurs of SR 34; 1923–1928	SR 343 >
