= Eastern Shore of Virginia =

Region of Virginia, US

Coordinates: 37°34′52.2″N 75°47′14.9″W

- Eastern Shore of Virginia
- Country: United States
- State: Virginia
- Largest city: Chincoteague
- Counties: List: Accomack; Northampton

Area
  - Total: 2,105 sq mi (5,450 km^{2})

Population (2020 Census)
  - Total: 45,695
  - Density: 21.71/sq mi (8.381/km^{2})
- Time zone: UTC−5 (EST)
  - Summer (DST): UTC−4 (EDT)

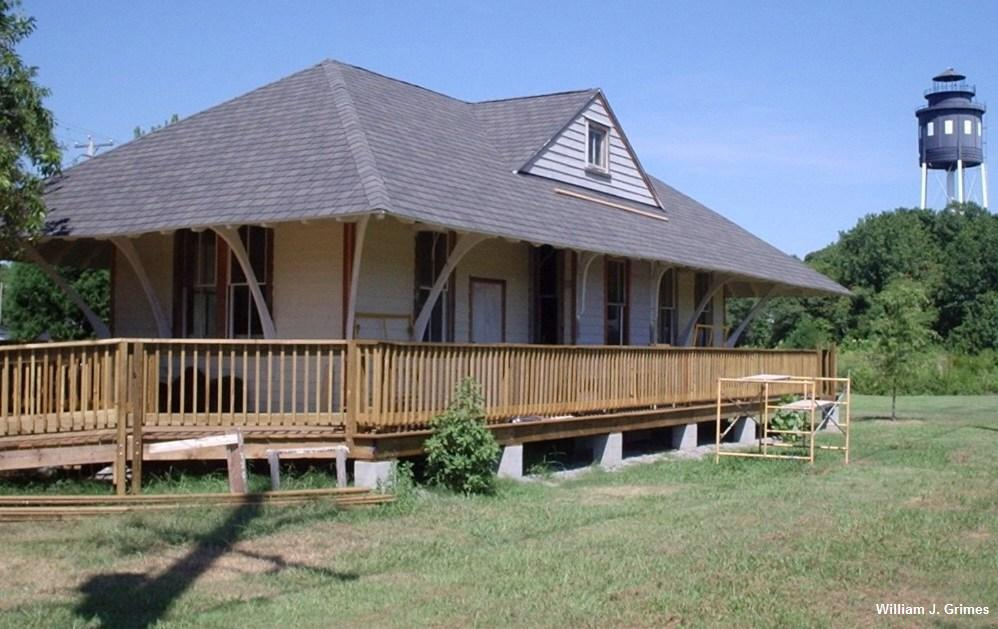
Bloxom depot, Cape Charles, Virginia

The Eastern Shore of Virginia is the easternmost region of Virginia, US, and a 70-mile-long (110 km) region of the Delmarva Peninsula. It consists of two counties (Accomack and Northampton) on the Atlantic coast. It is detached from the mainland of Virginia by the Chesapeake Bay. Its population was 45,695 as of 2020.

== History ==
Accomac Shire was established in the Virginia Colony by the House of Burgesses in 1634 under the direction of King Charles I. It was one of the original eight shires of Virginia, and consisted of the whole of Virginia's Delmarva territory. The shire's name comes from the Native American word Accawmack, which means, "the other shore".

In 1642, the name was changed to Northampton County. (In England, "shires" and "counties" are the same thing.) In 1663, Northampton County was split into two counties. The northern two thirds took the original Accomac name, while the southern third remained as Northampton.

In 1670, the Virginia Colony's Royal Governor William Berkeley abolished Accomac County, but the Virginia General Assembly re-created it in 1671. In 1940, the General Assembly officially added a "k" to the end of the county's name to arrive at its current spelling, which is Accomack.

== Geography ==
The terrain is overall very flat, ranging from sea level to just 50 feet (15 m) above sea level. It is characterized by sandy and deep soil. The weather in the area has temperate summers and winters, significantly affected by the Chesapeake Bay and the Atlantic Ocean. The rural area has long been devoted to cotton, soybean, vegetable and truck farming, and large-scale chicken farms. Since the late 20th century, vineyards have been developed in both counties, and the Eastern Shore has received recognition as an American Viticultural Area (AVA).

The region has more than 78,000 acres of preserved parks, refuges, preserves and a national seashore and is a popular outdoor recreation destination for fishing, boating, hiking and kayaking. It is also an important birding hotspot along the Atlantic Flyway at the southernmost tip of the Delmarva Peninsula. There are public beaches at Cape Charles, Kiptopeke State Park, Savage Neck Dunes Natural Area Preserve, Tangier Island and the Chincoteague National Wildlife Refuge abutting the Assateague Island National Seashore.

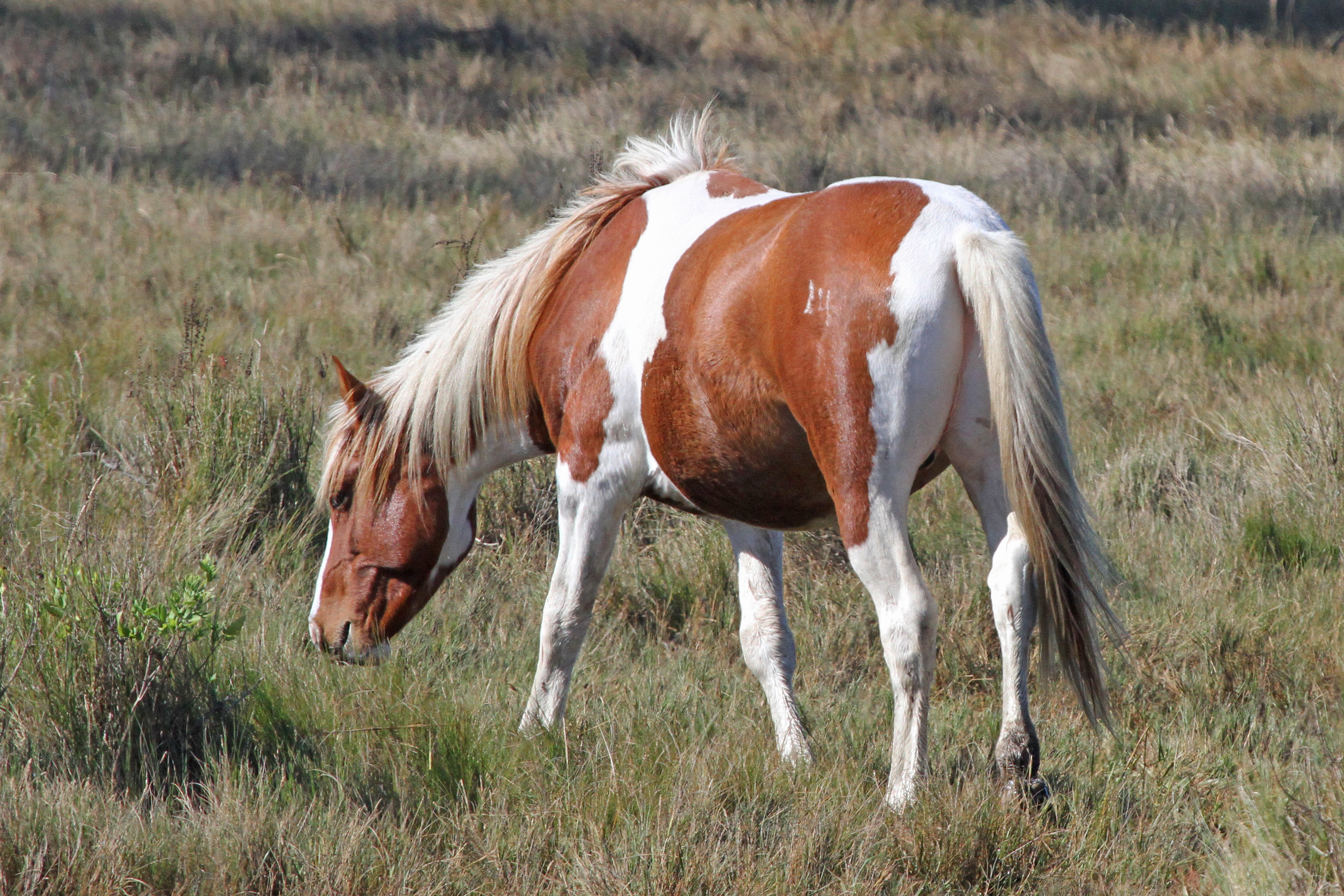
Chincoteague pony at Chincoteague National Wildlife Refuge

The area includes 70 miles of barrier islands, the longest chain of undeveloped barrier islands in the global temperate zone and a United Nations International Biosphere Reserve. At the northern end of the Atlantic side is the beach community of Chincoteague, famous for its annual wild pony roundup, gathered from Assateague Island. Wallops Flight Facility, a NASA space launch base, is located near Chincoteague. At the southern end of the Chesapeake Bay coast, the beach community of Cape Charles, a historic railroad town, is home to the Cape Charles Yacht Center, a super yacht service center. The town of Wachapreague on the Atlantic coast is a popular destination for fishing and guided trips out to the wild barrier islands. Onancock, a harbor town on the Chesapeake Bay, has a ferry service to Tangier Island, off the western shore in the Chesapeake Bay, during spring, summer and fall.

== Culture ==
Some maps of Virginia do not include the Eastern Shore. Encyclopedia Virginia's logo began depicting the region in 2018, after the inauguration of Ralph Northam, the second Governor of Virginia from the Eastern Shore. Geographically removed from the rest of Virginia, it has had a unique history of settlement and development influenced by agriculture, fishing, tourism, and the Pennsylvania Railroad. William G. Thomas describes the Eastern Shore during the late 19th and early 20th century as "a highly complex and interdependent landscape". He continues:

It was a liminal place, a zone of interpenetration, where the settlement patterns, speech, demography, and political outcomes defined its place in the South but its engagement with technology and rapid transformation of the landscape betrayed other allegiances, motives, forces, and effects.

== Transportation ==
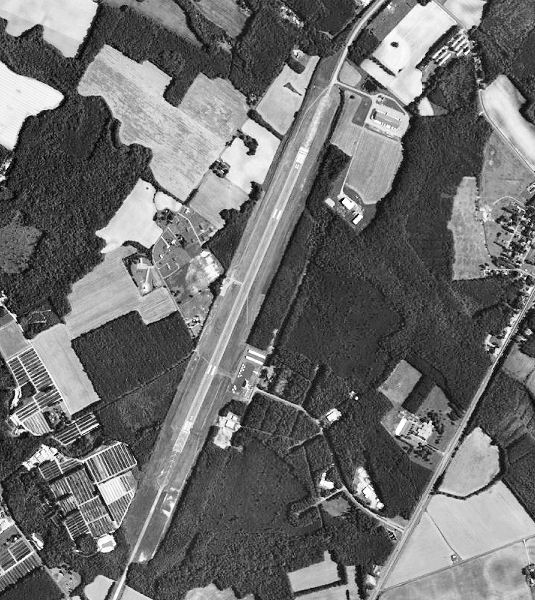
Accomack County Airport in 1994

=== Airports ===
- Accomack County Airport, in Melfa
- Campbell Field Airport, in Weirwood
- Tangier Island Airport, on Tangier Island

=== Highway ===
The 17.6-mile-long (28.3 km) Chesapeake Bay Bridge–Tunnel, which is part of U.S. Route 13, spans the mouth of the Bay and connects the Eastern Shore to South Hampton Roads and the rest of Virginia. Before the Chesapeake Bay Bridge–Tunnel was built in 1964, the Little Creek-Cape Charles Ferry provided the continuation of U.S. 13 across this stretch of water.

==== U.S Highways ====
- US 13
- US 13 Bus. (Accomac)
- US 13 Bus. (Cape Charles)

==== State Routes ====
- SR 175
- SR 176
- SR 178
- SR 179
- SR 180
- SR 182
- SR 183
- SR 184
- SR 187
- SR 316

=== Public transportation ===
STAR Transit provides public transit services for both Accomack and Northampton counties, serving both with fixed-route bus and paratransit operations.

=== Railroads ===
- Delmarva Central Railroad (former)

=== Trails ===
- Eastern Shore of Virginia Rail Trail

== Media ==
=== Newspapers ===
The area is served by the locally owned and operated weekly Eastern Shore Post and the monthly publication Eastern Shore First. Radio stations WESR (AM) and WESR-FM operate the local news website ShoreDailyNews.com.

=== Radio stations ===
The region has a number of radio stations with broadcasting towers located on the Eastern Shore. In addition to the ones listed below, the southern portion of Northampton County can receive stations from Hampton Roads reliably. Also, localities in the north of Accomack County can receive stations from the Salisbury/Ocean City, Maryland area.

Call sign	Frequency	Band	City of license	Format	Notes
WESR (AM)	1330	AM	Onley-Onancock	Country music	
WMVA	88.9	FM	Painter	Gospel music	
WHAR	89.1	FM	Cheriton	Contemporary Christian	Air1
WHRX	90.1	FM	Nassawadox	NPR/Variety	rebroadcasts WHRV
WZLV	90.7	FM	Cape Charles	Contemporary Christian	K-Love
W218CQ	91.5	FM	Accomac	Christian radio	Bible Broadcasting Network
WHRE	91.9	FM	Eastville	NPR/Variety	rebroadcasts WHRV
WROX	96.1	FM	Exmore	Alternative rock	
WCCZ	96.9	FM	Nassawadox	Classic hits	
WHRF	98.3	FM	Belle Haven	Classical music	rebroadcasts WHRO-FM
WOWZ	99.3	FM	Accomac	Classic Country	
WVES	101.5	FM	Chincoteague	Adult hits	rebroadcasts WCTG
WESR-FM	103.3	FM	Onley-Onancock	Adult contemporary	
W289CE	105.7	FM	Onley-Onancock	Country music	rebroadcasts WESR (AM)

== Demographics ==
Historical population
Census	Pop.	Note	%±
1960	47,601		—
1970	43,446		−8.7%
1980	45,893		5.6%
1990	44,764		−2.5%
2000	51,398		14.8%
2010	45,553		−11.4%
2020	45,695		0.3%
1960-1990 2000; 2010 2020

Eastern shore racial demographics
Race / Ethnicity (NH = Non Hispanic)	Pop 2010	Pop 2020	% 2010	% 2020
White alone (NH)	27,021	26,757	59.31%	58.56%
Black alone (NH)	13,744	12,395	30.17%	27.13%
Hispanic (any race)	3,724	4,498	8.17%	9.84%
Asian alone (NH)	258	329	0.56%	0.72%
American Indian and Alaskan Native alone (NH)	123	123	0.27%	0.27%
Pacific Islander alone (NH)	36	9	0.09%	0.02%
Some other race alone (NH)	59	129	0.14%	0.28%
Mixed Race or Multiracial (NH)	588	1,455	1.29%	3.18%
Total	45,553	45,695	100.00%	100.00%

== Politics ==
Presidential election results
Year	Democratic	Republican	Others
2024	45.7% 10,977	53.4% 12,842	0.9% 213
2020	47.5% 11,245	51.2% 12,127	1.4% 322
2016	45.5% 9,995	51.3% 11,269	3.3% 722
2012	50.6% 11,396	48.3% 10,889	1.1% 257
2008	51.4% 11,407	47.5% 10,546	1.2% 256
2004	44.0% 8,293	55.1% 10,395	0.9% 167
2000	44.2% 7,432	51.4% 8,651	4.4% 734
1996	46.9% 7,789	40.8% 6,776	12.3% 2,037
1992	40.1% 7,518	41.4% 7,754	18.5% 3,471
1988	40.6% 6,685	57.6% 9,488	1.8% 296
1984	37.2% 6,581	62.0% 10,953	0.8% 139
1980	46.9% 7,235	48.8% 7,546	4.3% 670
1976	50.9% 7,266	45.8% 6,537	3.3% 468
1972	28.3% 3,652	70.3% 9,083	1.4% 184
1968	29.5% 3,885	35.3% 4,641	35.2% 4,629
1964	51.5% 5,044	48.3% 4,731	0.1% 11
1960	53.6% 4,731	46.0% 3,671	0.4% 31

The Eastern Shore is politically divided, with Accomack County generally voting for the Republican Party and Northampton County generally voting for the Democratic Party. As a whole, the Shore is generally a competitive region, but also leans Republican owing to Accomack's larger share of the population.

It voted against the presidential winner in 2020 and 1992. Also, Democrats won Virginia in 2016, 2020, and 2024, but lost the Eastern Shore each time. In the 2017 gubernatorial election, it gave 50.5% of the vote to Republican Ed Gillespie and 49.0% of the vote to Democrat Ralph Northam, with Northam winning the election statewide. In the 2025 gubernatorial election, it also voted against Democrat Abigail Spanberger, despite Spanberger winning statewide by 15%.

It is represented in the U.S. House of Representatives by Republican Jen Kiggans, in the Virginia Senate by Republican Bill DeSteph, and in the Virginia House of Delegates by Republican Robert Bloxom Jr.

== See also ==
- Battle of Kedges Strait – the last naval engagement of the American Revolutionary War
- Debedeavon
- Delmarva Peninsula
- Eastern Shore of Maryland
- Chincoteague Island, Virginia
