= 1923 Virginia state highway renumbering =

This article is part of the highway renumbering series.
Alabama	1928, 1957
Arkansas	1926
California	1964
Colorado	1953, 1968
Connecticut	1932, 1963
Florida	1945
Indiana	1926
Iowa	1926, 1969
Louisiana	1955
Maine	1933
Massachusetts	1933
Minnesota	1934
Missouri	1926
Montana	1932
Nebraska	1926
Nevada	1976
New Jersey	1927, 1953
New Mexico	1988
New York	1927, 1930
North Carolina	1934, 1937, 1940, 1961
Ohio	1923, 1927, 1962
Pennsylvania	1928, 1961
Puerto Rico	1953
South Carolina	1928, 1937
South Dakota	1927, 1975
Tennessee	1983
Texas	1939
Utah	1962, 1977
Virginia	1923, 1928, 1933, 1940, 1958
Washington	1964
Wisconsin	1926
Wyoming	1927

In 1923, the U.S. state of Virginia renumbered many of its state highways. This renumbering was caused by the increase in mileage. Note that old SR 26 was removed entirely.

== List of routes ==
=== Two-digit routes ===
New	Old	Notes
SR 10	SR 10 and part of SR 11	
SR 11	SR 11	
SR 12	SR 12	
SR 13	SR 13	
SR 14	SR 14	
SR 15	SR 12Z	
SR 16	SR 16	
SR 17	SR 17	
SR 18	SR 18	
SR 19	SR 19	
SR 20	SR 20	
SR 21	SR 21	
SR 22	SR 22	
SR 23	SR 23	
SR 24	SR 24	
SR 25	SR 25	
SR 26	new	
SR 27	SR 27	
SR 28	SR 28	
SR 29	part of SR 9 Spur	
SR 30	part of SR 9 Spur #1 and one alignment of SR 9X	
SR 31	SR 1	
SR 32	SR 2	
SR 33	SR 3	
SR 34	SR 4	
SR 35	SR 5	
SR 36	SR 6	
SR 37	SR 7	
SR 38	SR 8	
SR 39	SR 9	
SR 40	SR 12X	
SR 41	new	

=== Spur routes ===
New	Old	Notes
SR 101	new	
SR 102	new	
SR 103	SR 12W	
SR 104	new	
SR 105	new	
SR 106	SR 10Y	
SR 107	Part of SR 10	
SR 108	new	
SR 109	new	
SR 111	SR 11X	
SR 112	new	
SR 113	new	
SR 114	SR 11Z	
SR 115	new	
SR 116	SR 10 Spur	
SR 117	new	
SR 121	SR 12Y	
SR 122	SR 12X	
SR 123	new	
SR 131	new	
SR 132	new	
SR 141	SR 14 Connector	
SR 142	new	
SR 143	new	
SR 171	new	
SR 172	new	
SR 221	SR 22 Spur	
SR 291	SR 9 Spur #2	
SR 311	new	
SR 312	new	
SR 321	SR 2 Connector	
SR 322	new	
SR 323	SR 20 Connector	
SR 324	new	
SR 325	new	
SR 331	SR 15	
SR 341	new	
SR 342	new	
SR 371	SR 7X	
SR 372	SR 7Y	
SR 373	new	
SR 374	new	
SR 391	part of SR 9 Spur #1	
SR 392	part of SR 9 Spur #1	
SR 393	part of SR 9X	
SR 394	new	
