= WESR =

WESR may refer to:

- WESR (AM), a radio station (1330 AM) licensed to Onley-Onancock, Virginia, United States
- WESR-FM, a radio station (103.3 FM) licensed to Onley, Virginia, United States
