= Virginia State Route 179 =

State highway in Accomack County, Virginia, US

State Route 179

Route information
- Maintained by VDOT
- Length: 2.94 mi (4.73 km)
- Existed: 1933–present
- Tourist routes: Virginia Byway

Major junctions
- West end: SR 1023 in Onancock
- SR 126 in Onancock; US 13 in Onley
- East end: US 13 Bus. / SR 789 Onley

Location
- Country: United States
- State: Virginia
- Counties: Accomack

Highway system
- Virginia Routes; Interstate; US; Primary; Secondary; Byways; History; HOT lanes
← SR 178	→ SR 180

State Route 179 (SR 179) is a primary state highway in the U.S. state of Virginia. The state highway runs 2.94 miles (4.73 km) from SR 1023 in Onancock east to U.S. Route 13 Business (US 13 Business) in Onley in central Accomack County.

== Route description ==
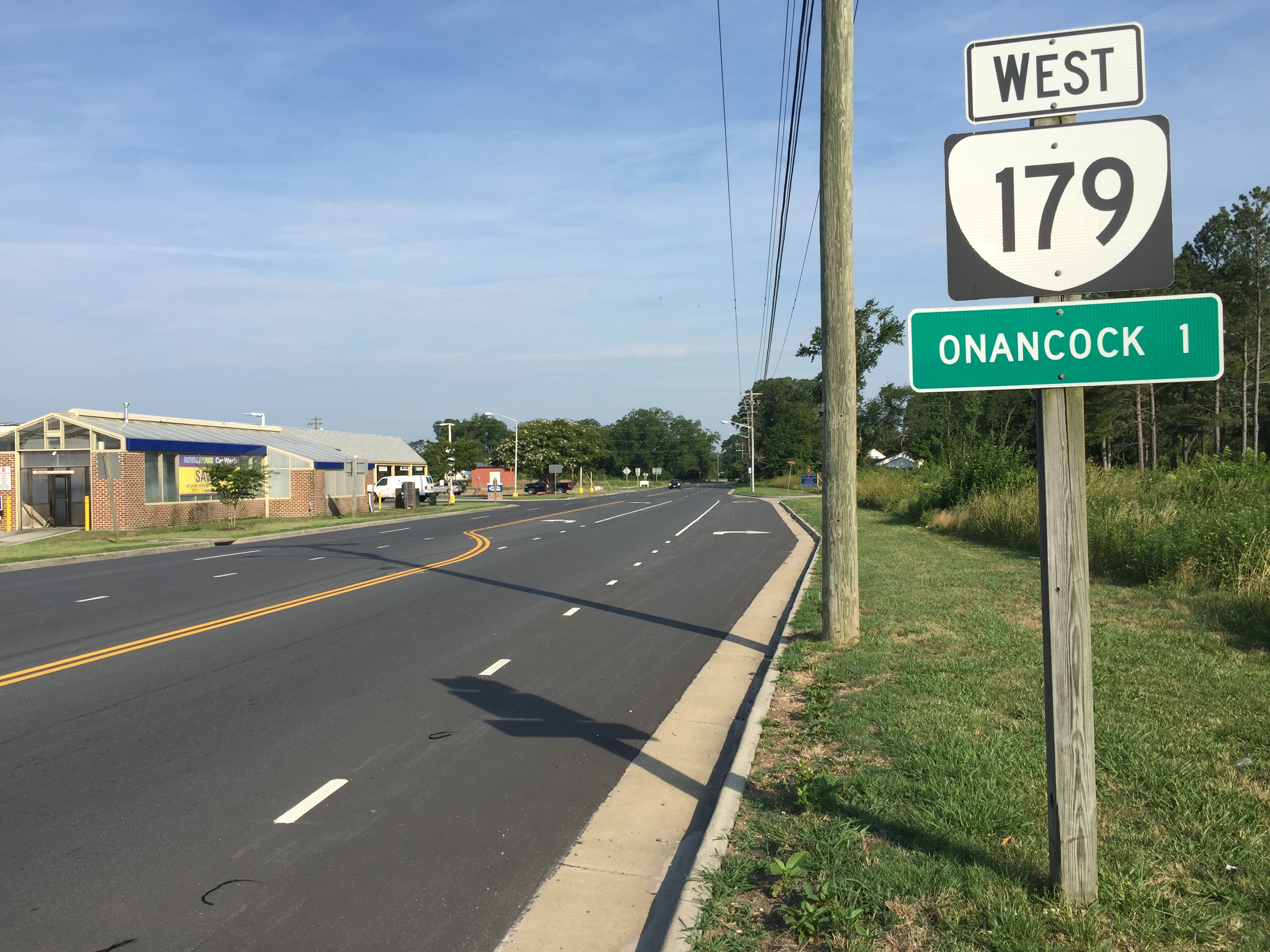
View west along SR 179 at US 13 in Onley

SR 179 begins at Onancock Wharf in the town of Onancock, where the historic Hopkins and Brother Store is located. The road curves back to the east as SR 1023 (King Street) at the head of the peninsula between the North and Central branches of Onancock Creek on which the town is centered. SR 179 heads east through the town as two-lane undivided Market Street, which passes by the historic Cokesbury Church. The state highway meets the western end of SR 126 (Fairgrounds Road) at the eastern edge of town. Following this, the roadway passes north of Riverside Shore Memorial Hospital. SR 179 continues east to the town of Onley, on the edge of which the highway intersects US 13 (Lankford Highway). The state highway curves south as Main Street to its southern terminus at US 13 Business (Coastal Boulevard) in the center of Onley.

== Major intersections ==
The entire route is in Accomack County.

Location	mi	km	Destinations	Notes
Onancock	0.00	0.00	SR 1023 (King Street) – Onancock Wharf	Western terminus
Onancock	1.52	2.45	SR 126 east (Fairgrounds Road) – Tasley	Western terminus of SR 126
Onley	2.30	3.70	US 13 (Lankford Highway) – Accomac, Melfa	
Onley	2.94	4.73	US 13 Bus. (Coastal Boulevard) / SR 789 south (East Main Street) – Salisbury, MD, Cape Charles	Eastern terminus
1.000 mi = 1.609 km; 1.000 km = 0.621 mi

< SR 539	District 5 State Routes; 1928–1933	SR 541 >
