= Virginia State Route 176 =

State highway in Virginia, United States

State Route 176

Route information
- Maintained by VDOT
- Length: 2.58 mi (4.15 km)
- Existed: 1933–present

Major junctions
- West end: SR 316 / SR 673 in Parksley
- East end: US 13 at Centerville

Location
- Country: United States
- State: Virginia
- Counties: Accomack

Highway system
- Virginia Routes; Interstate; US; Primary; Secondary; Byways; History; HOT lanes
← SR 175	→ SR 177

State Route 176 (SR 176) is a primary state highway in the U.S. state of Virginia. Known for most of its length as Parksley Road, the state highway runs 2.58 miles (4.15 km) from SR 316 in Parksley east to U.S. Route 13 (US 13) at Centerville in central Accomack County.

== Route description ==
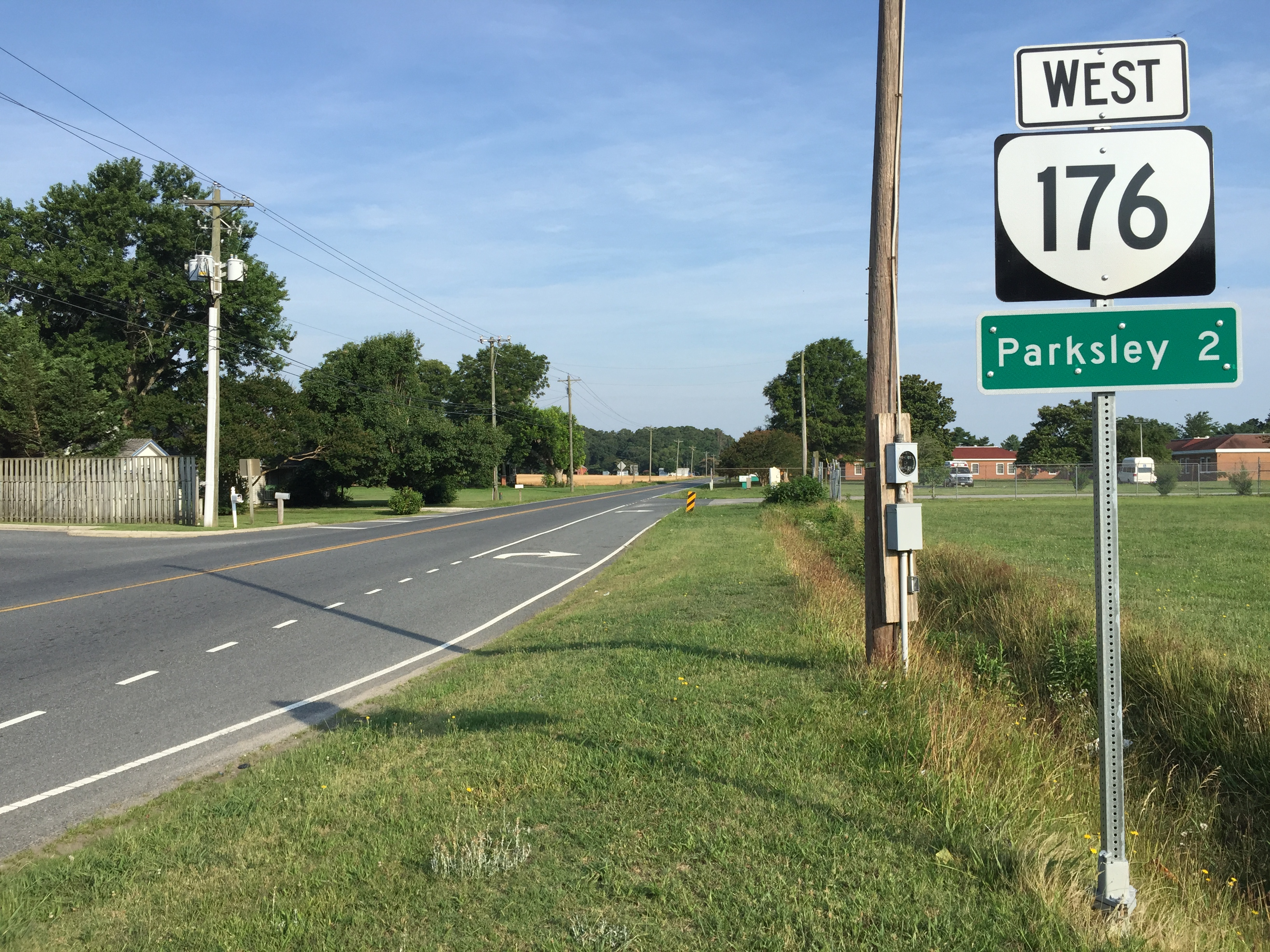
View west along SR 176 at US 13 in Centerville

SR 176 begins at an intersection with SR 316 (Cassatt Avenue) in the center of the town of Parksley. Bennett Street continues west as SR 673 toward Justisville. SR 176 heads southeast as a two-lane undivided road and has a grade crossing of an inactive railroad line immediately to the east of SR 316, passing to the south of the Eastern Shore Railway Museum before exiting the town. The state highway follows Parksley Road southeast from the town limit to the route's eastern terminus at US 13 (Lankford Highway) in the hamlet of Centerville.

== Major intersections ==
The entire route is in Accomack County.

Location	mi	km	Destinations	Notes
Parksley	0.00	0.00	SR 316 (Cassatt Avenue) / SR 673 west (Bennett Street) – Bloxom, Onley	Western terminus
Centerville	2.58	4.15	US 13 (Lankford Highway) – Accomac, Pocomoke City	Eastern terminus
1.000 mi = 1.609 km; 1.000 km = 0.621 mi

none	Spurs of SR 34; 1923–1928	SR 342 >
< SR 520	District 5 State Routes; 1928–1933	SR 522 >
