= Whaleyville, Virginia =

Coordinates: 36°35′18″N 76°41′05″W

Whaleyville is a neighborhood of Suffolk, Virginia, United States. It was formerly an incorporated town located in southern Nansemond County, Virginia. Whaleyville is located midway between the former county seat at downtown Suffolk and the North Carolina border along U.S. Route 13.

Whaleyville is part of the region popularly known as Hampton Roads. The community is represented on Suffolk City Council by Council Member LeOtis Williams.

The Great Dismal Swamp is located a few miles east of Whaleyville.

== Etymology ==
Whaleyville was named for another town of the same name, Whaleyville, Maryland, located on the Delmarva Peninsula north of Virginia's Eastern Shore. There, Seth Mitchell Whaley (1821–1901) was born and grew up. He was active in the lumber mill business in Maryland.

== History ==
In 1877, Seth M. Whaley bought a farm in the southern portion of Nansemond County, Virginia and opened a sawmill nearby. He worked in cooperation with Jackson Brothers Lumber Company, which was established in the new village of Whaleyville, Virginia. Soon what became called the "Big Mill" was operating 24 hours a day.

Between 1885 and 1902, the Suffolk and Carolina Railway, a narrow gauge railroad was built from Suffolk through Whaleyville south to Edenton, North Carolina. A branch line extended from Beckford Junction (on the Suffolk-Edenton section) to Elizabeth City, North Carolina. Renamed the Virginia and Carolina Coast Railroad in 1906, it became part of the regional Norfolk and Southern Railway, a predecessor of the modern Norfolk Southern Corporation. Ports on the railroad at Suffolk at Nansemond Wharf on the Nansemond River and Elizabeth City on the Pasquotank River each offered Whaleyville a means to ship its lumber and produce of local farmers.

The long-distance Norfolk and Carolina Railroad was also built nearby in 1884 to connect what became the north–south main line of the Atlantic Coast Line Railroad with the towns and cities of Suffolk, Portsmouth and Norfolk.

At the new mill town of Whaleyville, new stores were built. In 1907, the Bank of Whaleyville opened. A high school was added in 1915.

The Lumber Mill at Whaleyville closed in 1919, and moved to Fayetteville, North Carolina. Many residents also made the move. Lumber continued to be harvested locally, but the area became more dependent upon agricultural activities. However, despite losings it biggest employers, the community preserved. According to a local source, "In 1928. Whaleyville had 500-600 residents, a cotton gin, peanut storage warehouses, two churches, and one of the best consolidated schools in Nansemond County."

Whaleyville was long located in Nansemond County. Records indicate it was formally incorporated by the General Assembly as a town between 1950 and 1973.

Nansemond County was one of a number of localities in southeastern Virginia which underwent change in their political structure between 1952 and 1967, resulting in the current large independent cities where counties and smaller cities and towns had largely been in the past. In 1972, Whaleyville merged with Nansemond County and that county's other incorporated town, Holland, to form the independent city of Nansemond. Only two years later, Nansemond merged with the former seat of Nansemond County, Suffolk, to form the present-day city of Suffolk.

Although Whaleyville is now politically located within a modern city, it is still surrounded substantially by a farms and woodland. Local Whaleyville residents strive to maintain a small town setting as one of the widely diverse types of communities in Suffolk, which at 430 square miles (1,100 km^{2}), is the largest geographically in Virginia.

== Transportation ==
During the Great Depression, the Norfolk and Southern Railway (N&S) abandoned its line through Whaleyville, and sold its local tracks and facilities near the port in Suffolk to the Virginian Railway. In 1967, the Atlantic Coast Line Railroad (ACL) merged with the Seaboard Air Line Railroad, (SAL) forming the Seaboard Coast Line Railroad (SCL). Both had served Suffolk. Among many parallel tracks considered redundant by the new SCL, the ACL trackage near Whaleyville was also abandoned.

The predecessor agency of the Virginia Department of Transportation was created in 1906. Road building began in 1909. In 1932, the secondary roads in Nansemond County were added to the state system under the Byrd Road Act. After bearing such State Highway numbers as 506, 53, and 37, the main highway through Whaleyville was designated U.S. Route 13.

On July 1, 2006, the City of Suffolk assumed control of its roads including those in the Whaleyville area from the Virginia Department of Transportation.

As part of the Suffolk 2026 Comprehensive Plan, the city plans to bypass Whaleyville. US 13 (along with NC Highway 11) is a strategic highway corridor in North Carolina towards Greenville.

== Historical sites ==
- Seth M. Whaley's home is still standing on Whaleyville Boulevard. The home is now occupied by private owners.
- Whaleyville United Methodist Church was founded in 1884 for the mill workers and the people of the area. The church is still in use and two stained glass windows bear benefactor S.M. Whaley's name.
- The bank building erected in 1907 by T.O. Knight is still standing. In its 100th year, members of the Whaleyville Historical Society are working with the City of Suffolk, which owns the building, to possible open a Whaleyville Museum there. The bank building is currently housing a restaurant.

== See also ==
- Suffolk, Virginia
- Political subdivisions of Virginia § Boroughs
