= SFQ =

SFQ may refer to:

- Safe Food Production Queensland, an Australian approved certifying organisation
- Sexual Functioning Questionnaire, a standardised questionnaire which studies sexual impotence problems
- Single flux quanta, used in superconducting digital logic circuits
- Special Forces Qualification, the initial formal training program for entry into the United States Army Special Forces
- Stochastic fairness queuing, an algorithm
- SFQ, FAA LID code for Suffolk Executive Airport, Virginia
- SFQ, IATA code for Şanlıurfa Airport, Turkey
