= Virginia State Route 191 =

State highway in the City of Chesapeake, Virginia, US

State Route 191
- Jolliff Road

Route information
- Maintained by VDOT
- Length: 3.13 mi (5.04 km)
- Existed: 1933–present

Major junctions
- South end: US 13 / US 58 / US 460 / US 460 Alt. in Chesapeake
- North end: SR 337 in Chesapeake

Location
- Country: United States
- State: Virginia
- Counties: City of Chesapeake

Highway system
- Virginia Routes; Interstate; US; Primary; Secondary; Byways; History; HOT lanes
← SR 190	→ SR 192

State Route 191 (SR 191) is a primary state highway in the U.S. state of Virginia. Known as Jolliff Road, the state highway runs 3.13 miles (5.04 km) from U.S. Route 13 (US 13), US 58, US 460, and US 460 Alternate north to SR 337 within the independent city of Chesapeake.

== Route description ==
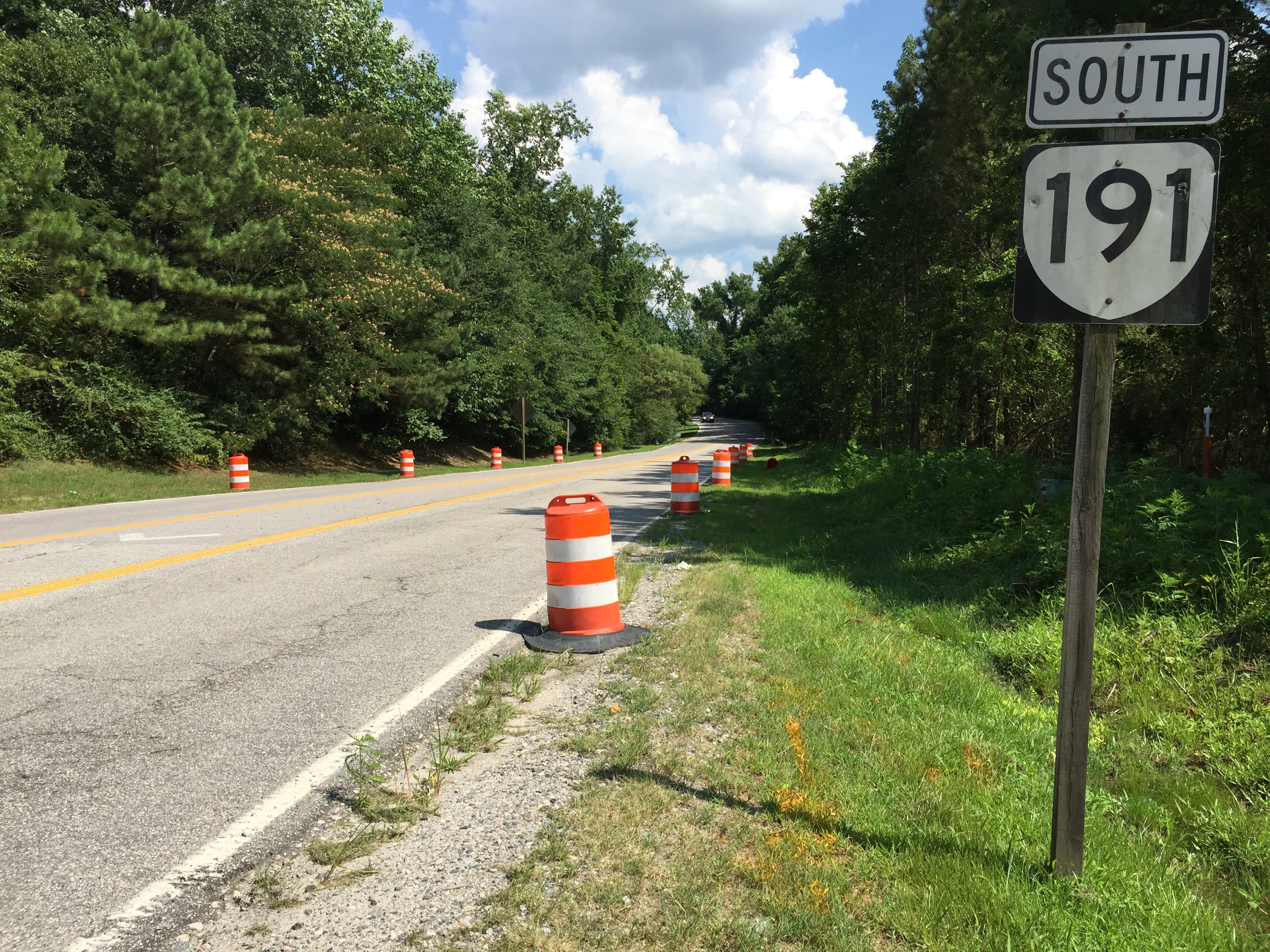
View south along SR 191 at SR 337 in Chesapeake

SR 191 begins at a four-way intersection with US 13, US 58, US 460, and US 460 Alternate in the Bower's Hill area of the city of Chesapeake. US 13, US 58, US 460 head west as Military Highway toward Suffolk; just west of the intersection is the U.S. Highways' interchange with Interstate 664 (I-664) (Hampton Roads Beltway). The south leg of the intersection is also Military Highway, which US 13 and US 460 follow toward Norfolk and Virginia Beach. The east leg of the intersection is Airline Boulevard, which US 58 and US 460 Alternate follow toward Portsmouth. The north leg of the intersection is SR 191, which immediately turns west and crosses over I-664 with no access. The state highway crosses Goose Creek, a tributary of the Western Branch Elizabeth River, and gradually curves north. SR 191 intersects Dock Landing Road before reaching its northern terminus at SR 337 (Portsmouth Boulevard) in the Jolliff section of Chesapeake.

== Major intersections ==
The entire route is in Chesapeake.

mi	km	Destinations	Notes
0.00	0.00	US 13 / US 58 / US 460 / US 460 Alt. east (Military Highway / Airline Boulevard) to I-64 / I-264 east / I-664 – Virginia Beach	Southern terminus
3.13	5.04	SR 337 (Portsmouth Boulevard)	Northern terminus
1.000 mi = 1.609 km; 1.000 km = 0.621 mi

< SR 538	District 5 State Routes; 1928–1933	SR 540 >
