= Temperanceville, Virginia =

- Census-designated place
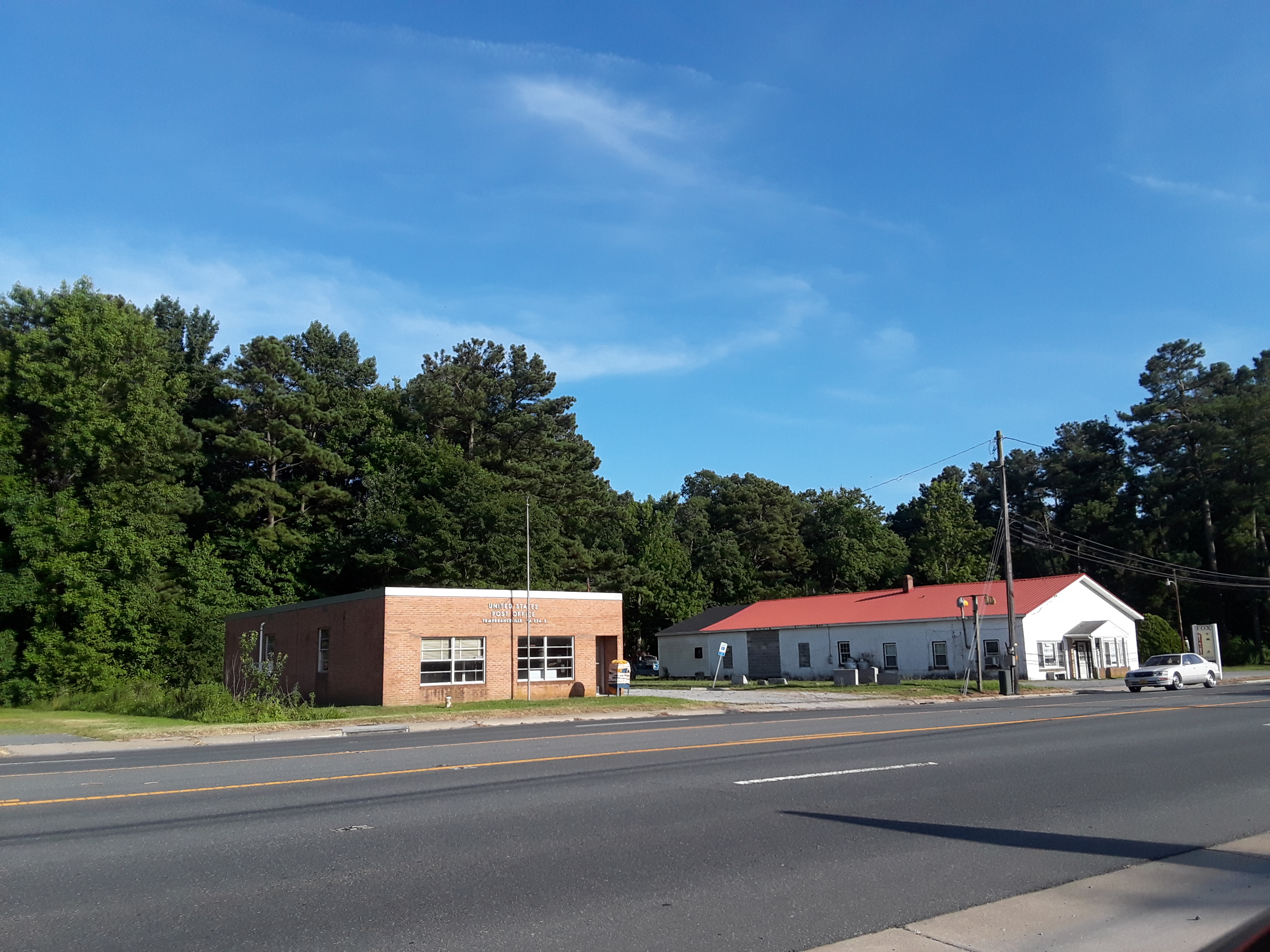
- U.S. Route 13 and the Temperanceville post office, July 2018

- Location in Accomack County and the state of Virginia.
- Coordinates: 37°53′57″N 75°33′10″W
- Country: United States
- State: Virginia
- County: Accomack
- Elevation: 43 ft (13 m)

Population (2020)
  - Total: 308
- Time zone: UTC−5 (Eastern (EST))
  - Summer (DST): UTC−4 (EDT)
- FIPS code: 51-48776
- GNIS feature ID: 2584929

Temperanceville is a census-designated place (CDP) in Accomack County, Virginia, United States. It was first listed as a CDP in 2010. As of the 2020 census, it had a population of 308.

Temperanceville was originally built up chiefly by Quakers.

It lies at an elevation of 43 feet.

== Demographics ==
Historical population
Census	Pop.	Note	%±
2010	358		—
2020	308		−14.0%
U.S. Decennial Census; 2010 2020

Temperanceville was first listed as a census designated place in the 2010 U.S. census.

=== 2020 census ===
Temperanceville CDP, Virginia – Racial and ethnic composition Note: the US Census treats Hispanic/Latino as an ethnic category. This table excludes Latinos from the racial categories and assigns them to a separate category. Hispanics/Latinos may be of any race.
Race / Ethnicity (NH = Non-Hispanic)	Pop 2010	Pop 2020	% 2010	% 2020
White alone (NH)	222	171	62.01%	55.52%
Black or African American alone (NH)	107	88	29.89%	28.57%
Native American or Alaska Native alone (NH)	1	2	0.28%	0.65%
Asian alone (NH)	0	1	0.00%	0.32%
Pacific Islander alone (NH)	0	0	0.00%	0.00%
Some Other Race alone (NH)	0	2	0.00%	0.65%
Mixed Race or Multi-Racial (NH)	4	14	1.12%	4.55%
Hispanic or Latino (any race)	24	30	6.70%	9.74%
Total	358	308	100.00%	100.00%
