= Norfolk Premium Outlets =

- Location: Norfolk, Virginia, United States
- Coordinates: 36.8824775°N 76.1991834°W
- Address: 1600 Premium Outlets Boulevard
- Opened: June 29, 2017; 9 years ago
- Developer: Simon Property Group
- Manager: Simon Premium Outlets
- Owner: Simon Property Group
- Num. of stores: 50+
- Website: premiumoutlets.com

Norfolk Premium Outlets is an American outlet shopping complex located in Norfolk, Virginia on U.S. Route 13 near the interchange with Interstate 64. Developed by Simon Property Group (who also owns and manages nearby Williamsburg Premium Outlets) and built by Cleveland Construction, the facility opened June 29, 2017, at the site of the old Lake Wright Golf Course, after one year of construction. Currently, about 50 stores are open with more to be added in the near future.

== Road Controversy ==
Some controversy arose between Norfolk and neighboring Virginia Beach concerning routing into the future mall. Virginia Beach refused to allow construction of a Lake Wright Boulevard within their limits, to connect to the planned complex. Even with the proposal not requiring city money, concerns about traffic within Virginia Beach as well as commitments to the Burton Station neighborhood the road would have traversed were cited as reasons against the proposal. Instead, Norfolk officials chose to extend Wesleyan Drive north so as to keep all road work within Norfolk city limits.
