= WESR-FM =

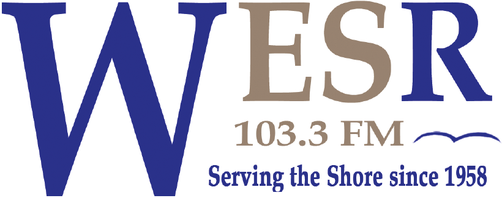
- Onley–Onancock, Virginia; United States
- Broadcast area: Eastern Shore of Virginia
- Frequency: 103.3 MHz
- Branding: 103.3 FM The Shore

Programming
- Format: Adult contemporary Oldies
- Affiliations: Townhall News

Ownership
- Owner: Eastern Shore Radio, Inc.
- Sister stations: WESR

History
- First air date: 1968
- Call sign meaning: Eastern Shore Radio

Technical information
- Licensing authority: FCC
- Facility ID: 18386
- Class: B
- ERP: 50,000 watts
- HAAT: 98 meters (322 ft)
- Transmitter coordinates: 37°43′2.0″N 75°41′1.0″W

Links
- Public license information: Public file; LMS
- Webcast: WESR-FM Webstream
- Website: WESR Online

WESR-FM is an adult contemporary– and oldies-formatted radio station licensed to Onley and Onancock, Virginia, serving the Eastern Shore of Virginia. WESR-FM is owned and operated by Eastern Shore Radio, Inc.
