= WESR (AM) =

- Onley-Onancock, Virginia; United States
- Broadcast area: Eastern Shore of Virginia
- Frequency: 1330 kHz
- Branding: Coastal Country AM1330 and FM105.7

Programming
- Format: Country

Ownership
- Owner: Eastern Shore Radio, Inc.
- Sister stations: WESR-FM

History
- First air date: January 23, 1958
- Call sign meaning: W Eastern Shore Radio

Technical information
- Licensing authority: FCC
- Facility ID: 18385
- Class: D
- Power: 5,000 Watts daytime 51 Watts nighttime
- Transmitter coordinates: 37°43′2.0″N 75°41′1.0″W

Links
- Public license information: (AM) Public file; LMS
- Website: WESR Online

WESR is a country music–formatted broadcast radio station licensed to Onley-Onancock, Virginia, serving Eastern Shore of Virginia. WESR is owned and operated by Eastern Shore Radio, Inc.

== Translator ==
In addition to the main station, WESR is relayed by an FM translator to widen its broadcast area, especially during nighttime hours when the AM frequency reduces power to only 51 watts.

Call sign	Frequency	City of license	FID	ERP (W)	HAAT	Class	FCC info
W289CE	(105.7 FM) FM	Onley–Onancock, Virginia	157774	250 watts	78 m (256 ft)	D	LMS
