= Millie Tunnell =

American supercentenarian, born into slavery

Millie Tunnell was born into slavery on the Tunnell plantation near Drummond town in Accomack County, Virginia between 1780 and 1783 on March 10 and died January 1896, at 111 years of age. Tunnell achieved notoriety after she had reached her 100th birthday when reporters began annual interviews that were dispatched in the local papers- which continued until her death in 1896. She was noted to have a sharp memory, smoked a corncob pipe and at 110 years credited with the ability to thread a sewing needle without eyeglasses. At the time she was also credited the oldest living woman in Jamaica, Queens.

== Early history ==
Due to paucity of slave records, Her actual birth date is disputed, and she is thought to be as old as 114. Charles Ewell owned a neighboring plantation and his slave, Merrick Ewell, married Millie, whom he was able to see daily and together they had six children. Merrick Ewell became emancipated when Charles Ewell died, having liberated all his slaves. Merrick, fearing re-enslavement, quickly left Virginia for Greenport in Suffolk County on the north fork of Long Island where he engaged in fishing and farming. In 1855 Henry Tunnell died and liberated his slaves including Millie and her progeny.

After Henry Tunnell's death his will emancipating his slaves was contested by his family, so that in Millie had to continue working on the plantation, eventually earning the US$1,269 necessary to buy her family's freedom. They arrived in the north around 1860.

The family settled in Flushing. Millie later went to live with a daughter, Martha on Grand Street in Jamaica, Queens. The children did not know of Merrick, he had remarried in Greenport and had three daughters by a much younger wife, all of whom married. Aging, he had become feeble, whereupon she had him placed in the asylum at Yaphank. The family member of another asylee mentioned the name Merrick to a friend who recognized the inmate as her father, and she had him taken to Jamaica. Thirty years before the Civil War Merrick and Millie lived as husband and wife separated by slavery, and in 1886 were reunited as a family.

== Later life ==
Reporters began visiting after the centenarian showed that her memory was sharp and she possessed a quick wit. Her age and story was compelling enough to garner attention in the local papers and she was a local celebrity until her death at 111 years in 1896. Later nine members of her family were interred at the family plot at Maple Grove Cemetery.

== Juneteenth ==
Tunnell was buried in Maple Grove Cemetery, and was in an unmarked grave. Millie had bought three burial plots, enough for nine people on the Southern edge of Maple Grove. She could not afford a tombstone, hence her grave for the next 125 years lay unmarked. Then the Friends of Maple Grove (FMG), a historical society, came calling. The search for a picture of a slave who was between 111 and 114 years old led to a unique Juneteenth community project between historians and students from the Kew Forest School, a college prep school in Forest Hills. Carl Ballenas, the president of FMG and Helen Day, a genealogist, partnering with The Daughters of the American Revolution- Increase Carpenter Chapter; and an art teacher at the school, Narges Anvar then came up with a school art project to honor the life of Millie Tunnell. Student Annie Vaca's ('23) artwork was selected and written words by the students have been preserved on a bronze plaque on Millie's memorial stone, which fit the pieces of her life together. The names of her children were also inscribed on the memorial. It was delivered on June 8, 2021, and a live-stream of the unveiling was done on June 19.

== See also ==
Juneteenth
