= Hills Farm (Greenbush, Virginia) =

Historic house in Virginia, United States

- U.S. National Register of Historic Places
- Virginia Landmarks Register
- Location within Virginia Location within the United States
- Location: 19065 Hills Farm Rd., Greenbush, Virginia
- Coordinates: 37°46′55″N 75°42′16″W
- Area: 5 acres (2.0 ha)
- Built: 1747
- Built by: White, William H.
- Architect: Adams, James W.
- Architectural style: Colonial, Colonial Revival
- NRHP reference No.: 08000872
- VLR No.: 001-0023

Significant dates
- Added to NRHP: September 12, 2008
- Designated VLR: June 19, 2008

Hills Farm, also known as Hunting Creek Plantation, is a historic home and farm located in Greenbush, Accomack County, Virginia. It was built in 1747. The building is a 1 1/2-story, five-bay, gable roofed, brick dwelling. A one-story, wood-framed and weatherboarded wing to the east gable end of the original house was added in 1856. The house was restored in 1942 using the conventions of the Colonial Revival style. Also on the property are a contributing smokehouse and dairy (18th century), a barn and three small sheds (before 1920), and a caretaker's cottage (1940s).

It was added to the National Register of Historic Places in 2008.
