= WCCZ =

- Nassawadox, Virginia; United States
- Broadcast area: Eastern Shore of Virginia
- Frequency: 96.9 MHz
- Branding: 96.9 The Cape

Programming
- Format: Classic hits

Ownership
- Owner: GSB Media, LLC.

History
- First air date: 2010
- Former call signs: WFAJ (2010–2025)

Technical information
- Licensing authority: FCC
- Facility ID: 162401
- Class: B1
- Power: 13,500 watts
- HAAT: 87 meters (285 ft)
- Transmitter coordinates: 37°31′46.0″N 75°54′44.0″W

Links
- Public license information: Public file; LMS
- Webcast: WCCZ Webstream
- Website: 969thecape.com

WCCZ (96.9 FM) is a commercial radio station licensed to Nassawadox, Virginia, United States, and serving the Eastern Shore of Virginia. WCCZ is owned and operated by GSB Media, LLC.

The station signed on the air in 2010. It used the WFAJ call sign until January 14, 2025.

WCCZ (formerly WFAJ) was owned and operated by Hispanic Target Media, Inc. It carried a Spanish-language Regional Mexican radio format, known as "Radio Amigo" until December 2024. Programming is shared on a number of similar stations in the U.S., all known as Radio Amigo. WFAJ was sold to GSB Media in July 2024.
