= Justisville, Virginia =

Unincorporated community in Virginia, United States

Coordinates: 37°47′45″N 75°41′10″W

Justisville is an unincorporated community in Accomack County, Virginia, United States.
