= Somerton Historic District =

Historic district in Virginia, United States

- U.S. National Register of Historic Places
- U.S. Historic district
- Virginia Landmarks Register
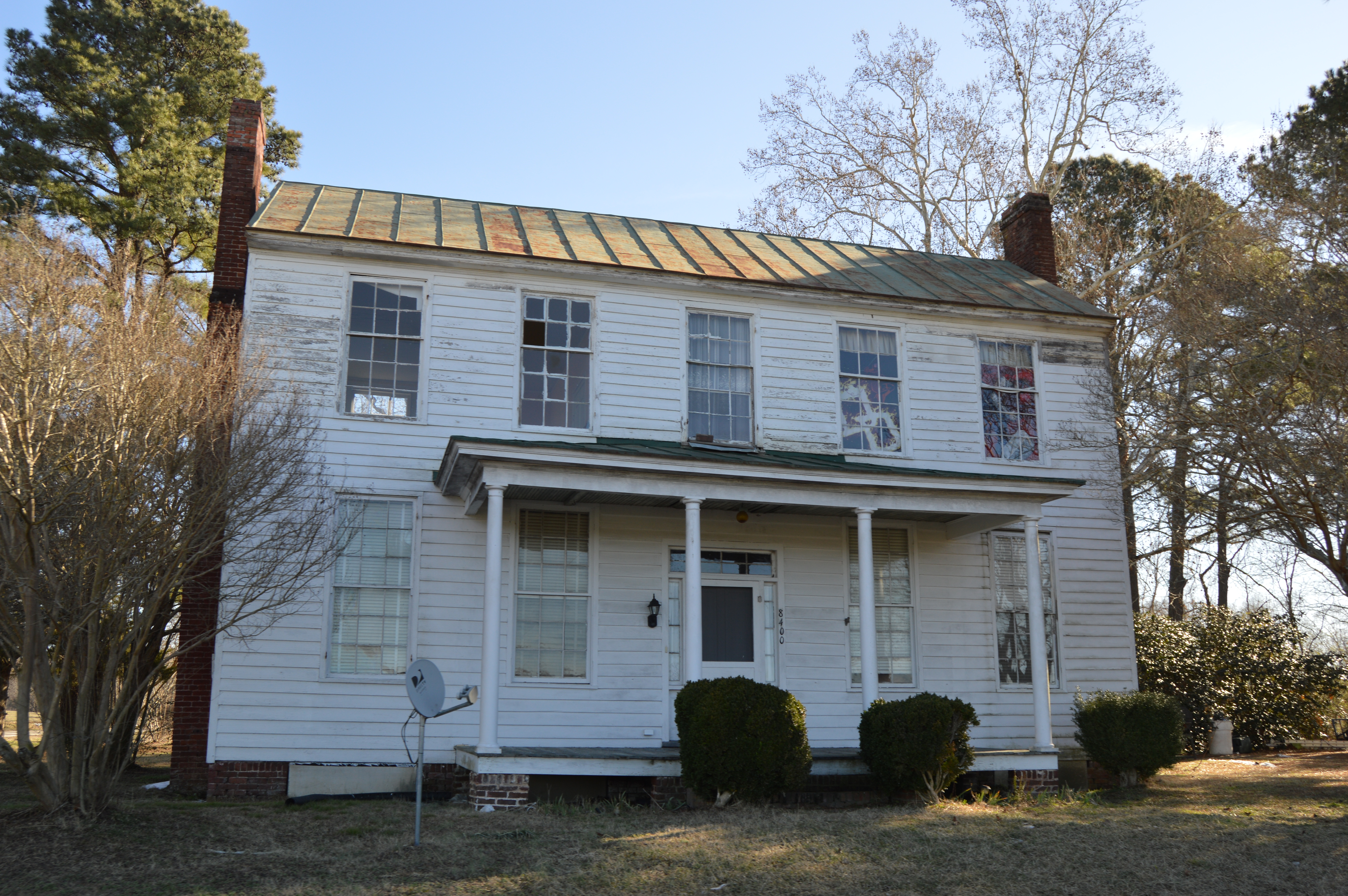
- I-house at Arthur and Pittmantown

- Location within Virginia Location within the United States
- Location: Arthur Dr., Pittmantown Rd., Boonetown Rd, Suffolk, Virginia
- Coordinates: 36°34′06″N 76°45′03″W
- Area: 236.4 acres (95.7 ha)
- Built: c. 1800
- Architectural style: Georgian, Federal
- NRHP reference No.: 08001272
- VLR No.: 133-5256

Significant dates
- Added to NRHP: December 31, 2008
- Designated VLR: September 18, 2008

Somerton Historic District is a national historic district located at Suffolk, Virginia. Prior to annexation in 1974 Somerton was part of now non-existing Nansemond County. The district encompasses 15 contributing buildings and 2 contributing sites in the rural village of Somerton in Virginia. The district was a 250 acre 17th century grant to Sir Thomas Jernigan a colonist from Somerleyton in Suffolk County. England. The district includes an 18th-century ordinary, a 19th-century church, and modest dwellings dating from the 18th, 19th, and 20th centuries surrounded by large agricultural fields. The buildings are in a variety of popular architectural styles ranging from Federal to Folk Victorian. Notable buildings include the Somerton United Methodist Church and cemetery (c. 1880), Washington Smith Ordinary (c. 1800), and Ellis General Store.

It was added to the National Register of Historic Places in 2008.
