= Holland, Virginia =

Incorporated town in Virginia, United States

Coordinates: 36°40′53″N 76°46′49″W

Holland, Virginia was an incorporated town in the southwestern section of Nansemond County, Virginia. Since 1974, it has been a community in the independent city of Suffolk, Virginia following a political consolidation which formed Virginia's largest city in geographic area.

== History ==
Holland was named for an English family headed by Capt. John Holland, who arrived in Massachusetts in 1630. A record given in Hotten's List of Persons of Quality, 1600–1700, states John Holland and wife as being sought in Massachusetts in 1627 for taking part in tax protests against the Crowns wishes under Theophilus Clinton, 4th Earl of Lincoln. Holland followed Thomas Dudley as Steward for the Earl, later Governor of Massachusetts. As a ship's captain, he traveled from Nantucket Point to Virginia and out to the English-held islands of the Caribbean. He died at sea (1652) but is actually buried at Cape Charles, Virginia.

His son, John Jr.(mentioned in the Suffolk County Massachusetts wills of 1651, as heir to John Holland seniors' island known as 'Munings Moore'(? migrated to Jamestown around 1645 and was a Major in the Virginia militia in 1654 in Westmoreland County and a member of the Virginia House of Burgesses during the 1654/1655 session. He moved the family to Nansemond County.

James Holland, grandson of the original land grant holder for the area that later became Holland, Virginia, was still living in Nansemond County in 1680. He is buried somewhere on the grounds of Fighting Cock Plantation in Chuckatuck.

Holland is located in what used to be called Old Nansemond County. In 1860, the Holland City Commission was made up of 12 members, 10 of whom were named Holland. Holland became a stop on the Atlantic and Danville Railway in 1890.

On May 21, 1928, the first Ruritan Club in the United States was founded in Holland, Virginia.

== Consolidation into Suffolk ==
As part of a wave of consolidations in southeastern Virginia during the 1950s, 1960s and 1970s, in 1972 Holland merged with Nansemond County and that county's other incorporated town, Whaleyville, to form the independent city of Nansemond. Only two years later, Nansemond merged with the former county seat of Nansemond County, Suffolk, to form the present-day city of Suffolk.
