= Suffolk Executive Airport =

- IATA: none; ICAO: KSFQ; FAA LID: SFQ

Summary
- Airport type: Public
- Owner/Operator: City of Suffolk
- Serves: Suffolk, Virginia
- Location: 3 NM SW of Suffolk CBD
- Elevation AMSL: 70 ft / 21 m
- Coordinates: 36°40′55″N 076°36′04″W
- Website: www.suffolkva.us/airport

Map
- Location in Virginia

Runways
Direction	Length		Surface
Direction	ft	m	Surface
4/22	5,007	1,526	Asphalt
7/25	3,750	1,143	Asphalt

Statistics (2019)
- Aircraft operations: 40,656
- Based aircraft: 54
- Source: Federal Aviation Administration

Suffolk Executive Airport (ICAO: KSFQ, FAA LID: SFQ) is a general aviation airport located in Suffolk, Virginia. The airport is owned by the City of Suffolk and is located at 1200 Gene Bolton Drive, approximately 3 nautical miles (5.6 km; 3.5 mi) southwest of Downtown Suffolk. The airport is also the site of Skydive Suffolk and the annual Suffolk Peanut Fest.

== Accidents and incidents ==
On May 8, 2021, a woman suffered serious injuries after hitting the roof of a hangar while skydiving at the airport. Suffolk Fire & Rescue personnel used a ladder truck with a platform to rescue her.

== See also ==
- List of airports in Virginia
