= Centerville, Accomack County, Virginia =

Unincorporated community in Virginia, United States

Coordinates: 37°45′26″N 75°37′16″W

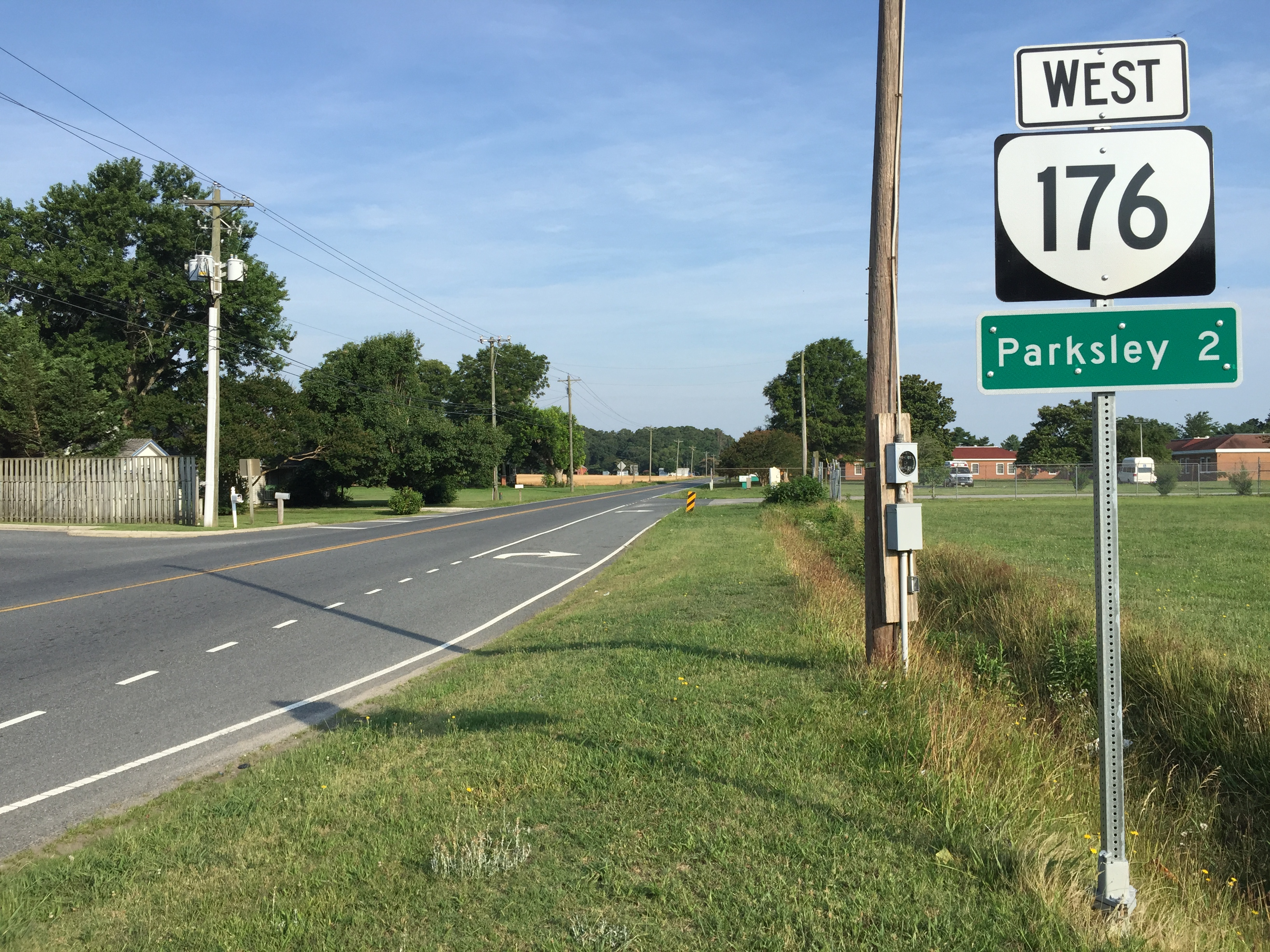
Centerville, Accomack County, Virginia

Centerville is an unincorporated community in Accomack County, Virginia, United States.
