= Greenbush, Virginia =

- Census-designated place
- Location in Accomack County and the state of Virginia.

- Location within Virginia Location within the United States
- Coordinates: 37°44′23″N 75°40′46″W
- Country: United States
- State: Virginia
- County: Accomack
- Elevation: 43 ft (13 m)

Population (2020)
  - Total: 224
- Time zone: UTC-5 (Eastern (EST))
  - Summer (DST): UTC-4 (EDT)
- GNIS feature ID: 2584854

Greenbush is a census-designated place (CDP) in Accomack County, Virginia, United States. Per the 2020 census, the population was 224.

Hills Farm was added to the National Register of Historic Places in 2008.

== Geography ==
The CDP lies at an elevation of 43 feet.

== Demographics ==
Historical population
Census	Pop.	Note	%±
2010	220		—
2020	224		1.8%
U.S. Decennial Census; 2010 2020

Greenbush was first listed as a census designated place in the 2010 U.S. census.

=== Racial and ethnic composition ===
Greenbush CDP, Virginia – Racial and ethnic composition Note: the US Census treats Hispanic/Latino as an ethnic category. This table excludes Latinos from the racial categories and assigns them to a separate category. Hispanics/Latinos may be of any race.
Race / Ethnicity (NH = Non-Hispanic)	Pop 2010	Pop 2020	% 2010	% 2020
White alone (NH)	119	79	54.09%	35.27%
Black or African American alone (NH)	48	57	21.82%	25.45%
Native American or Alaska Native alone (NH)	1	0	0.45%	0.00%
Asian alone (NH)	1	0	0.45%	0.00%
Native Hawaiian or Pacific Islander alone (NH)	0	0	0.00%	0.00%
Other race alone (NH)	0	1	0.00%	0.45%
Mixed race or Multiracial (NH)	0	8	0.00%	3.57%
Hispanic or Latino (any race)	51	79	23.18%	35.27%
Total	220	224	100.00%	100.00%
