= Accomac, Virginia =

- Town
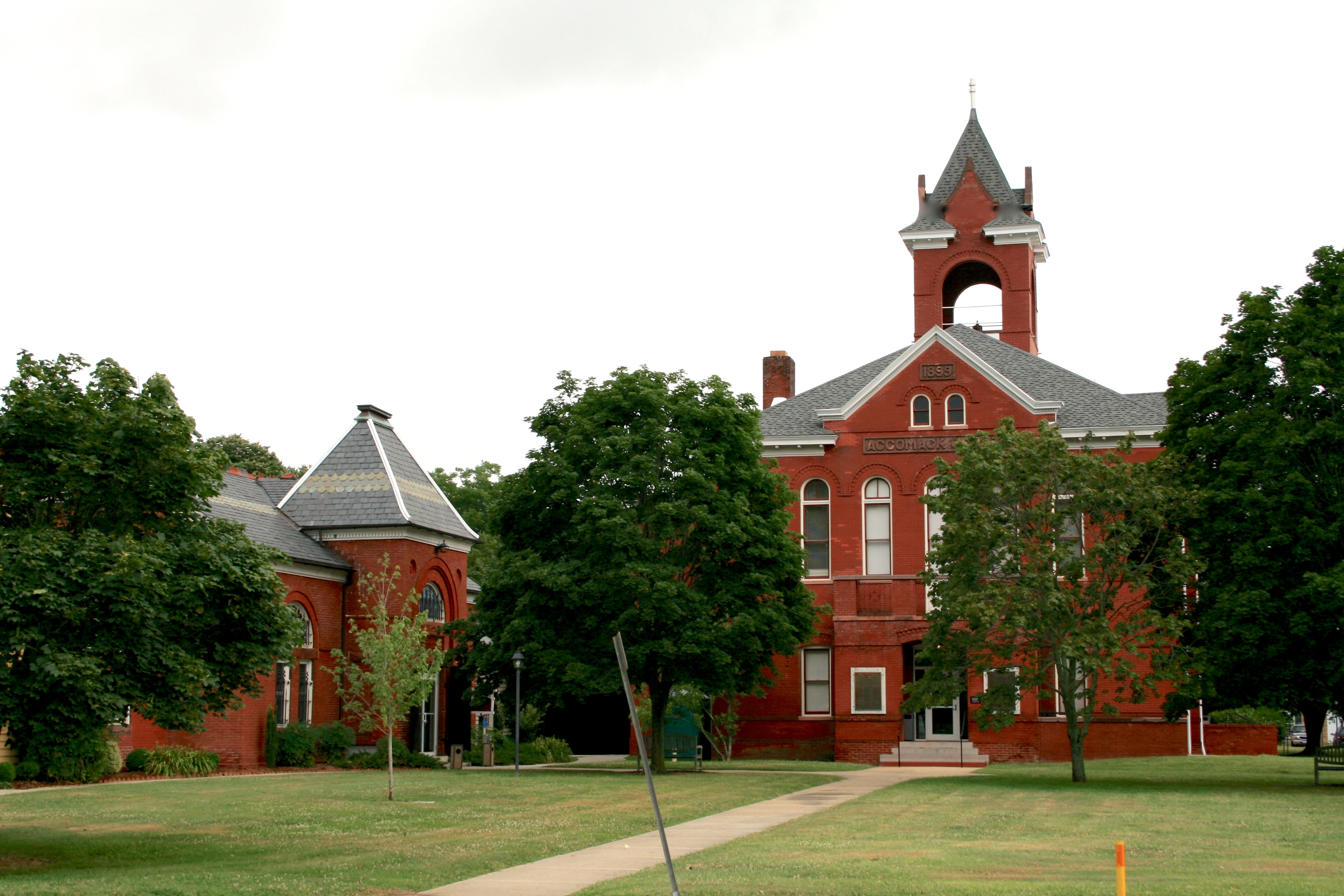
- The historic court green in Accomac

- Logo

- Location in Accomack County and the state of Virginia.
- Coordinates: 37°43′7″N 75°40′2″W
- Country: United States
- State: Virginia
- County: Accomack
- Founded: 1664

Area
  - Total: 0.41 sq mi (1.06 km^{2})
  - Land: 0.41 sq mi (1.06 km^{2})
  - Water: 0 sq mi (0.00 km^{2})
- Elevation: 39 ft (12 m)

Population (2020)
  - Total: 519
  - Estimate (2021): 522
  - Density: 1,188.0/sq mi (458.69/km^{2})
- Time zone: UTC−5 (Eastern (EST))
  - Summer (DST): UTC−4 (EDT)
- ZIP code: 23301
- Area codes: 757, 948
- FIPS code: 51-00180
- GNIS feature ID: 1498445
- Website: accomac.org

Accomac is a town in and the county seat of Accomack County, Virginia, United States. The population was 526 at the 2020 census.

== History ==
Though Accomack County was established as one of Virginia's eight original shires in 1634, the government was situated in the southern part of the Eastern Shore near Eastville until the division of the shore into two counties (Northampton and Accomack) in 1663. During this era, religious diversity began in the area, as Presbyterian Francis Makemie received a plantation nearby which he used as a base for his mercantile and missionary journeys, and where he died at age 50 a few years after winning a New York court case brought against his preaching (as the Scots-Irish emigrant to Maryland's Eastern Shore counties produced a preaching license from Barbados). Early Baptist Elijah Baker also arrived near Accomac before the American Revolutionary War, and was likewise imprisoned for unauthorized preaching, but eventually also had that case dismissed.

After the creation of the present-day Accomack County, the court convened alternatively at Pungoteague and Onancock until the 1690s when it shifted to the house of John Cole at the site that later became the town of Accomac, then known by the name Matompkin. A brick courthouse was built in 1756 and the surrounding settlement became known as Accomack Courthouse.

On December 7, 1786, Richard Drummond and six others (including Catherine Scott and Patience Robertson) petitioned the Virginia House of Delegates for the creation of an incorporated town at Accomack Courthouse. The House of Delegates reacted favorably, passing an "Act to establish a Town at the Courthouse of the county of Accomack...by the name of Drummond," named to honor the new town's chief landholder. It also named local gentlemen John Cropper Jun., Thomas Evans, John Teacle, Thomas Tailey (Bayly) and Thomas Custis as trustees of the new town, and ordered them to lay off lots. Many of the town's historic houses, churches, and other buildings were constructed between the last decade of the eighteenth century and first half of the nineteenth century, representing vernacular interpretations of late Georgian, Federal, and Greek Revival architectural styles, as the town prospered as the terminus of a ferry across Chesapeake Bay. The modern ferry only travels between nearby Onancock, Virginia and Tangier Island.

During the American Civil War, the Union Army occupied the Eastern Shore to cut supply lines to the south and prevent the Confederate Army from using the shore as a staging area to attack the north through Maryland. Union General Henry H. Lockwood commanded the occupying forces and established a headquarters in the rectory of St. James Episcopal Church (then home to town physician Dr. Peter F. Browne). Other than damages to the Presbyterian and Methodist Churches which were used by the army for stables and housing, Drummondtown escaped the war with little damage.

The late nineteenth century brought slow but steady economic prosperity for the citizens of Drummondtown, fueled by the arrival of the railroad from the north, and several new homes were constructed in and around the older core of the town in the 1880s and 1890s. The coming of the railroad also presented a challenge for Drummondtown when residents of the newly established town of Parksley initiated a referendum to move the county seat to the new community. The referendum vote took place in 1895 after nearly a decade of debate, and the residents of Accomack County elected to keep the court where it had been located for the past two centuries. By this time, the town had been renamed "Accomac" by order of the United States Post Office Department dated August 9, 1893. The name Accomac is derived from a Native American word translated to mean "on the other side".

== General information ==
- ZIP Code: 23301
- Area Code: 757
- Local Phone Exchange: 787
- School District: Accomack County Public Schools

== Geography ==
Accomac is located at 37°43′7″N 75°40′2″W (37.718678, −75.667323).

According to the United States Census Bureau, the town has a total area of 0.4 square mile (1.1 km^{2}), all land.

== Demographics ==
Historical population
Census	Pop.	Note	%±
1950	500		—
1960	414		−17.2%
1970	373		−9.9%
1980	522		39.9%
1990	466		−10.7%
2000	547		17.4%
2010	519		−5.1%
2020	519		0.0%
2021 (est.)	522	▲	0.6%
U.S. Decennial Census

As of the census of 2000, there were 547 people, 199 households, and 125 families residing in the town. The population density was 1,322.1 people per square mile (515.1/km^{2}). There were 235 housing units at an average density of 568.0 per square mile (221.3/km^{2}). The racial makeup of the town was 71.12% White, 24.68% African American, 2.56% Asian, 0.91% from other races, and 0.73% from two or more races. Hispanic or Latino of any race were 2.19% of the population.

There were 199 households, out of which 22.6% had children under the age of 18 living with them, 51.8% were married couples living together, 8.5% had a female householder with no husband present, and 36.7% were non-families. 35.7% of all households were made up of individuals, and 21.1% had someone living alone who was 65 years of age or older. The average household size was 2.13 and the average family size was 2.71.

In the town, the population was spread out, with 14.8% under the age of 18, 11.0% from 18 to 24, 30.7% from 25 to 44, 24.1% from 45 to 64, and 19.4% who were 65 years of age or older. The median age was 40 years. For every 100 females, there were 131.8 males. For every 100 females age 18 and over, there were 136.5 males.

The median income for a household in the town was $37,500, and the median income for a family was $51,250. Males had a median income of $34,375 versus $23,929 for females. The per capita income for the town was $24,050. About 3.7% of families and 6.2% of the population were below the poverty line, including 7.4% of those under age 18 and 11.9% of those age 65 or over.

== Transportation ==
=== Major highways ===
- US 13
- US 13 Bus.

=== Public transportation ===
STAR Transit provides public transit services, linking Accomac with Onley, Oak Hall, and other communities in Accomack and Northampton counties.

== Notable people ==
- Thomas H. B. Browne, born at Drummondtown, United States Congressman
- Millie Tunnell, born at Drummondtown, emancipated slave who met George Washington and died in Jamaica, Queens at 111 years of age.
- Henry A. Wise, born at Drummondtown, Governor of Virginia
