= Tasley, Virginia =

- Census-designated place
- Location in Accomack County and the state of Virginia.
- Coordinates: 37°42′45″N 75°41′49″W
- Country: United States
- State: Virginia
- County: Accomack
- Elevation: 39 ft (12 m)

Population (2020)
  - Total: 222
- Time zone: UTC−5 (Eastern (EST))
  - Summer (DST): UTC−4 (EDT)
- FIPS code: 51-48776
- GNIS feature ID: 2584928

Tasley is a census-designated place (CDP) in Accomack County, Virginia, United States. It was first listed as a CDP in 2010. Per the 2020 census, the population was 222.

== History ==
Tasley, once known as Accomac Station, traces its roots to the coming of the railroad to the Eastern Shore in 1884. When the station at Tasley was completed rail service began in earnest. The postal service set up a post office at Tasley in 1884. At one time, Tasley was a bustling railroad town, boasting the first electric power plant, first paved road and first self-organized volunteer fire company in the county. The Shore's main highway, US 13, ran right through the middle of town. Steamships from Baltimore docked at nearby Onancock; the produce and goods were carried from there to Tasley's busy rail station for fast shipment. In its heyday, Tasley boasted three restaurants, four general stores, a hotel, post office, rail station, two tractor dealerships, two sawmills, volunteer fire company, ice plant, coal sales, car dealerships, several produce grading sheds and power plant.

When the railroad ceased passenger service in 1958, the town was dealt a blow, but the coming of the Route 13 bypass in the mid-1960s robbed Tasley of its commercial and industrial status. The town fell into a deep slumber for many years before the growth in neighboring communities spilled over into its boundaries. Today, Tasley is home to A&N Electric Cooperative, which provides electric power for the entire Eastern Shore of Virginia; the Foodbank of the Eastern Shore is headquartered there and Studebaker's Antiques sells top-of-the-line vintage advertising items worldwide. A new fire station has been built, and several formerly empty buildings have been purchased and repurposed.

== Geography ==
The CDP lies at an elevation of 39 feet.

== Demographics ==
Historical population
Census	Pop.	Note	%±
2010	300		—
2020	222		−26.0%
U.S. Decennial Census; 2010 2020

Tasley was first listed as a census designated place in the 2010 U.S. census.

=== 2020 census ===
Tasley CDP, Virginia – Racial and ethnic composition Note: the US Census treats Hispanic/Latino as an ethnic category. This table excludes Latinos from the racial categories and assigns them to a separate category. Hispanics/Latinos may be of any race.
Race / Ethnicity (NH = Non-Hispanic)	Pop 2010	Pop 2020	% 2010	% 2020
White alone (NH)	96	67	32.00%	30.18%
Black or African American alone (NH)	146	100	48.67%	45.05%
Native American or Alaska Native alone (NH)	4	1	1.33%	0.45%
Asian alone (NH)	2	1	0.67%	0.45%
Pacific Islander alone (NH)	0	0	0.00%	0.00%
Some Other Race alone (NH)	0	0	0.00%	0.00%
Mixed Race or Multi-Racial (NH)	7	5	2.33%	2.25%
Hispanic or Latino (any race)	45	48	15.00%	21.62%
Total	300	222	100.00%	100.00%

== Transportation ==
The headquarters for STAR Transit, the public transit agency serving the Eastern Shore, are located in Tasley.
