= Onley, Virginia =

- Town
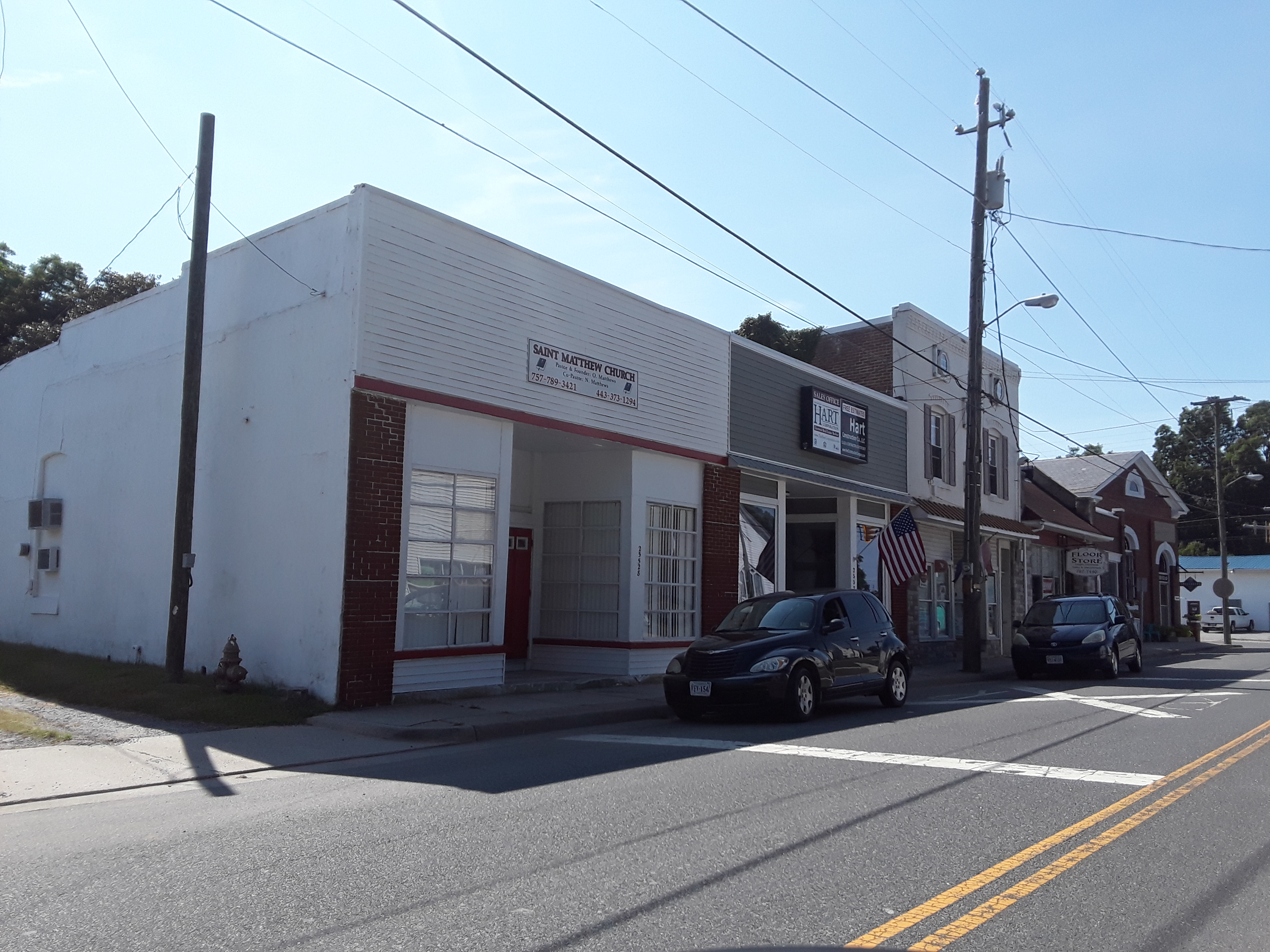
- Storefronts in Onley, July 2018

- Location in Accomack County and the state of Virginia.
- Coordinates: 37°41′25″N 75°43′0″W
- Country: United States
- State: Virginia
- County: Accomack

Area
  - Total: 0.81 sq mi (2.09 km^{2})
  - Land: 0.80 sq mi (2.07 km^{2})
  - Water: 0.0077 sq mi (0.02 km^{2})
- Elevation: 43 ft (13 m)

Population (2020)
  - Total: 532
  - Estimate (2019): 500
  - Density: 625/sq mi (241.4/km^{2})
- Time zone: UTC−5 (Eastern (EST))
  - Summer (DST): UTC−4 (EDT)
- ZIP code: 23418
- Area codes: 757, 948
- FIPS code: 51-59384
- GNIS feature ID: 1493377
- Website: https://townofonley.org/

Onley (/oʊnliː/, "only") is a town in Accomack County, Virginia, United States. As of the 2020 census, Onley had a population of 532.

== History ==
The community was named after Onley, the estate of Governor Henry A. Wise.

== Geography ==
Onley is located at 37°41′25″N 75°43′0″W (37.690352, −75.716759).

According to the United States Census Bureau, the town has a total area of 0.81 square miles (2.1 km^{2}), of which 0.81 square miles (2.1 km^{2}) is land and 0.008 square miles (0.02 km^{2}), or 0.98%, is water.

It lies at an elevation of 43 feet.

== Demographics ==
Historical population
Census	Pop.	Note	%±
1960	415		—
1970	464		11.8%
1980	526		13.4%
1990	532		1.1%
2000	496		−6.8%
2010	516		4.0%
2020	532		3.1%
U.S. Decennial Census

At the 2000 census there were 496 people, 223 households, and 144 families living in the town. The population density was 607.9 people per square mile (233.5/km^{2}). There were 271 housing units at an average density of 332.1 per square mile (127.6/km^{2}). The racial makeup of the town was 83.27% White, 13.91% African American, 0.20% Native American, 0.40% Asian, 1.61% from other races, and 0.60% from two or more races. Hispanic or Latino of any race were 1.41%.

Of the 223 households 23.3% had children under the age of 18 living with them, 48.0% were married couples living together, 11.2% had a female householder with no husband present, and 35.4% were non-families. 32.7% of households were one person and 20.6% were one person aged 65 or older. The average household size was 2.22 and the average family size was 2.72.

The age distribution was 18.8% under the age of 18, 5.0% from 18 to 24, 24.8% from 25 to 44, 25.4% from 45 to 64, and 26.0% 65 or older. The median age was 46 years. For every 100 females, there were 84.4 males. For every 100 females aged 18 and over, there were 78.3 males.

The median household income was $36,750 and the median family income was $42,891. Males had a median income of $28,854 versus $21,964 for females. The per capita income for the town was $19,115. About 8.3% of families and 12.5% of the population were below the poverty line, including 13.4% of those under age 18 and 12.6% of those age 65 or over.

== Climate ==
The climate in this area is characterized by hot, humid summers and generally mild to cool winters. According to the Köppen Climate Classification system, Onley has a humid subtropical climate, abbreviated "Cfa" on climate maps.

== Elected and appointed officials and staff ==
As of 2023, the Mayor of Onley is Henry E. "Ned" Finney. The Town Council consists of Vice Mayor William R. Ferguson, Daniel K. Bloxom Jr., A. Brian Corbin, Katelyn L. Hill, Rodney C. Lang and Woody W. Zember. The Town Manager is Susan M. Rillo, Jamye L. Salazar is the Town Clerk/Treasurer, Carl Bundick is the Town Attorney and Edwin J. Long is the Onley Chief of Police.

== Transportation ==
=== Major highways ===
- US 13
- SR 175

=== Public transportation ===
STAR Transit provides public transit services, linking Onley with Cape Charles, Oak Hall, and other communities in Accomack and Northampton counties on the Eastern Shore.

=== Railroads ===
Before going out of business in 2018, Onley was previously served by the Bay Coast Railroad.
