= National Register of Historic Places listings in Accomack County, Virginia =

Location of Accomack County in Virginia

This is a list of the National Register of Historic Places listings in Accomack County, Virginia.

This is intended to be a complete list of the properties and districts on the National Register of Historic Places in Accomack County, Virginia, United States. The locations of National Register properties and districts for which the latitude and longitude coordinates are included below, may be seen in an online map.

There are 31 properties and districts listed on the National Register in the county. Another property was once listed but has been removed.

This National Park Service list is complete through NPS recent listings posted April 10, 2026.

== Current listings ==
	Name on the Register	Image	Date listed	Location	City or town	Description
1	Accomac Historic District	Accomac Historic District	July 21, 1982 (#82004529)	U.S. Route 13 Business; 37°43′11″N 75°40′11″W	Accomac	
2	Arbuckle Place	Arbuckle Place	May 22, 1986 (#86001136)	Atlantic Rd. 37°52′27″N 75°31′37″W	Assawoman	
3	Assateague Beach Coast Guard Station	Assateague Beach Coast Guard Station	November 2, 2015 (#15000766)	Beach Rd., Assateague Island National Seashore; 37°51′51″N 75°22′05″W	Chincoteague	
4	Assateague Lighthouse	Assateague Lighthouse	June 4, 1973 (#73001989)	South of Chincoteague at the southern end of Assateague Island; 37°54′40″N 75°21′22″W	Chincoteague	
5	Bank Building	Bank Building	July 23, 1974 (#74002099)	23321 Courthouse Ave. 37°43′10″N 75°40′15″W	Accomac	
6	Edmund Bayly House		June 28, 1982 (#82004530)	Sheppard Rd. 37°34′37″N 75°53′06″W	Craddockville	
7	Bowman's Folly	Bowman's Folly	November 12, 1969 (#69000216)	Southeast of the junction of U.S. Route 13 and Joynes Neck Rd. 37°41′45″N 75°37′29″W	Accomac	
8	Bunting Place		April 11, 2003 (#03000210)	31181 Drummondtown Rd. 37°37′16″N 75°41′32″W	Wachapreague	
9	Central High School	Central High School	August 16, 2010 (#10000561)	32308 U.S. Route 13; 37°35′58″N 75°46′36″W	Painter	
10	Cokesbury Church	Cokesbury Church	November 27, 2004 (#04001265)	13 Market St. 37°42′43″N 75°45′08″W	Onancock	
11	Debtors' Prison	Debtors' Prison	November 7, 1976 (#76002087)	Courthouse Ave. 37°43′13″N 75°40′15″W	Accomac	
12	Captain Timothy Hill House	Captain Timothy Hill House	August 22, 2011 (#11000547)	5122 Main St. 37°56′49″N 75°21′25″W	Chincoteague Island	
13	Hills Farm		September 12, 2008 (#08000872)	19065 Hills Farm Rd. 37°46′55″N 75°42′15″W	Greenbush	
14	Hopkins and Brother Store	Hopkins and Brother Store	November 12, 1969 (#69000217)	Market St. 37°42′43″N 75°45′19″W	Onancock	Est. 1842, served as bank and community meeting place; in 1970 deeded to Assoc. for the Preservation of Virginia Antiquities
15	Locustville Academy	Locustville Academy	November 22, 2016 (#16000792)	28055 Drummondtown Rd. 37°39′29″N 75°40′30″W	Locustville	
16	Ker Place	Ker Place	February 26, 1970 (#70000780)	Northeastern corner of the junction of Crockett Ave. and Market St. 37°42′47″N 75°44′49″W	Onancock	Built 1799-1802 by John Shepard Ker in Federal architecture style; originally called Ker's Place; Virginia Historic Landmark; now a museum and headquarters of Eastern Shore of Virginia Historical Society
17	Mason House	Mason House	November 21, 1974 (#74002100)	North of Guilford off Winterville Rd. 37°50′01″N 75°39′13″W	Guilford	
18	Onancock Historic District	Onancock Historic District	October 8, 1992 (#92001266)	Roughly bounded by Joynes Branch, Onancock Creek, and Lake, Kerr, Jackson, Market, Justice, Johnson, and Holly Sts. 37°42′42″N 75°44′48″W	Onancock	
19	Samuel D. Outlaw Blacksmith Shop		May 17, 2023 (#100008968)	5 Boundary Ave. 37°42′36″N 75°44′03″W	Onancock	
20	Pitts Neck	Pitts Neck	October 21, 1976 (#76002088)	6 miles west of New Church on Pitts Creek Rd. 37°58′14″N 75°37′37″W	New Church	
21	Pocomoke Farm	Pocomoke Farm	February 15, 2007 (#07000054)	7492 Monument Rd. 37°55′58″N 75°38′06″W	Sanford	Now known as Makemie Monument Park
22	St. George's Church	St. George's Church	September 15, 1970 (#70000781)	State Route 178 northeast of its junction with State Route 180; 37°38′02″N 75°48′38″W	Pungoteague	
23	St. James Church	St. James Church	June 11, 1969 (#69000215)	23395 Drummondtown Rd. between Back St. and Business Rt 13. 37°43′03″N 75°40′20″W	Accomac	
24	Saxis Island Historic District		November 24, 2017 (#100001848)	Saxis Rd. and feeder lanes 37°55′28″N 75°43′18″W	Saxis	
25	Scarborough House Archaeological Site (44AC4)	Scarborough House Archaeological Site (44AC4)	May 16, 1985 (#85001125)	Scarborough Gut; 37°33′41″N 75°54′42″W	Davis Wharf	Site of the estate house of Edmund Scarborough
26	Shepherd's Plain	Shepherd's Plain	June 28, 1982 (#82004531)	West of Pungoteague; 37°37′40″N 75°50′25″W	Pungoteague	
27	Tangier Island Historic District	Tangier Island Historic District	June 27, 2014 (#14000384)	Most of Tangier Island; also an area south of Tangier Island in Chesapeake Bay; 37°49′39″N 75°59′32″W	Tangier	Boundary increase August 24, 2015
28	Wachapreague Historic District		April 16, 2026 (#100012915)	Richardson Avenue, Liberty Street, Brooklyn Avenue, Atlantic Avenue, Bayview Avenue, Main Street, Old Finney Road; 37°36′25″N 75°41′19″W	Wachapreague	
29	Wessells Root Cellar		February 26, 1970 (#70000779)	Northeast of the junction of Savannah and Wessells Farm Rds. 37°53′54″N 75°37′34″W	Hallwood	
30	Wharton Place	Wharton Place	November 3, 1972 (#72001378)	0.7 miles northeast of the junction of Metompkin and Pettit Rds. 37°50′58″N 75°32′01″W	Mappsville	
31	Willowdale		May 2, 2007 (#07000401)	18412 Willowdale Dr. 37°33′31″N 75°45′41″W	Painter	

== Former listing ==
	Name on the Register	Image	Date listed	Date removed	Location	City or town	Description
1	Corbin Hall		November 9, 1972 (#72001377)	June 10, 2005	E of Horntown on VA 679	Horntown	Destroyed by fire on February 14, 2000.

== See also ==
- List of National Historic Landmarks in Virginia
- National Register of Historic Places listings in Virginia
