= Makemie =

Makemie is a Scottish surname. It may refer to:

- Francis Makemie (1658-1708), Ulster Scots clergyman considered the founder of Presbyterianism in the United States
- Anne Makemie Holden (1702-c. 1787/88), early American patriot, younger daughter of Rev. Francis Makemie
- Makemie Memorial Presbyterian Church in Snow Hill, Maryland
- Makemie Monument Park, formerly known as Pocomoke Farm, maintained in honor of Rev. Francis Makemie in Accomack County, Virginia,
- Makemie Park, Virginia
