= Bank Building =

Bank Building, or variants thereof, may refer to:

== United States ==
- Bank Building (Accomac, Virginia), listed on the National Register of Historic Places listings in Accomack County, Virginia
- Bank Building (Uxbridge, Massachusetts), a historic building located at 40–44 South Street, in Uxbridge, Massachusetts

== United Kingdom ==
- Bank Buildings, Belfast, a building located at 1–27 Castle Street in Belfast, Northern Ireland
- Bank Buildings, Birkenhead, on a corner site at 1–7 Charing Cross, Birkenhead, Wirral, England

== See also ==
- Category:Bank buildings
