= Scarborough House Archaeological Site =

Archaeological site in Virginia, United States

- Scarborough House Archaeological Site (44AC4)
- U.S. National Register of Historic Places
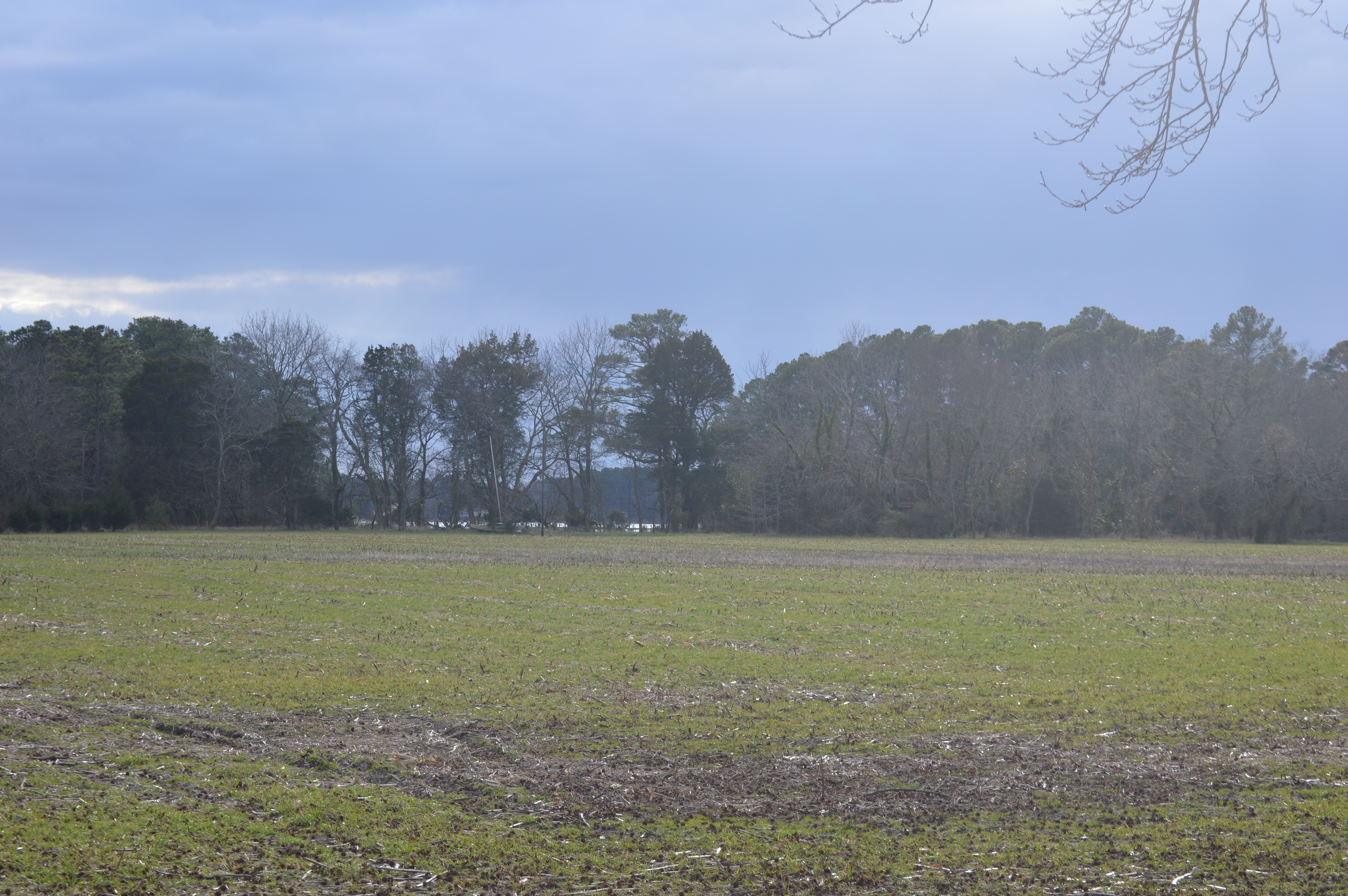
- Overview from the north
- Nearest city: Davis Wharf, Virginia
- Area: 9.5 acres (3.8 ha)
- NRHP reference No.: 85001125
- Added to NRHP: May 16, 1985

The Scarborough House Archaeological Site in Accomack County, Virginia, is believed to be the location of the estate house of Edmund Scarborough, the Eastern Shore's largest landowner in the 17th century. Called Occohannock House for its location on the creek of the same name, the site is now buried in a silted-over cove called Scarborough Gut. Virginia state archaeologists have mapped the extent and integrity of the site.

The site was listed as a Virginia Landmark and placed National Register of Historic Places in 1985.

== See also ==
- National Register of Historic Places listings in Accomack County, Virginia
