= Locustville Academy =

- U.S. National Register of Historic Places
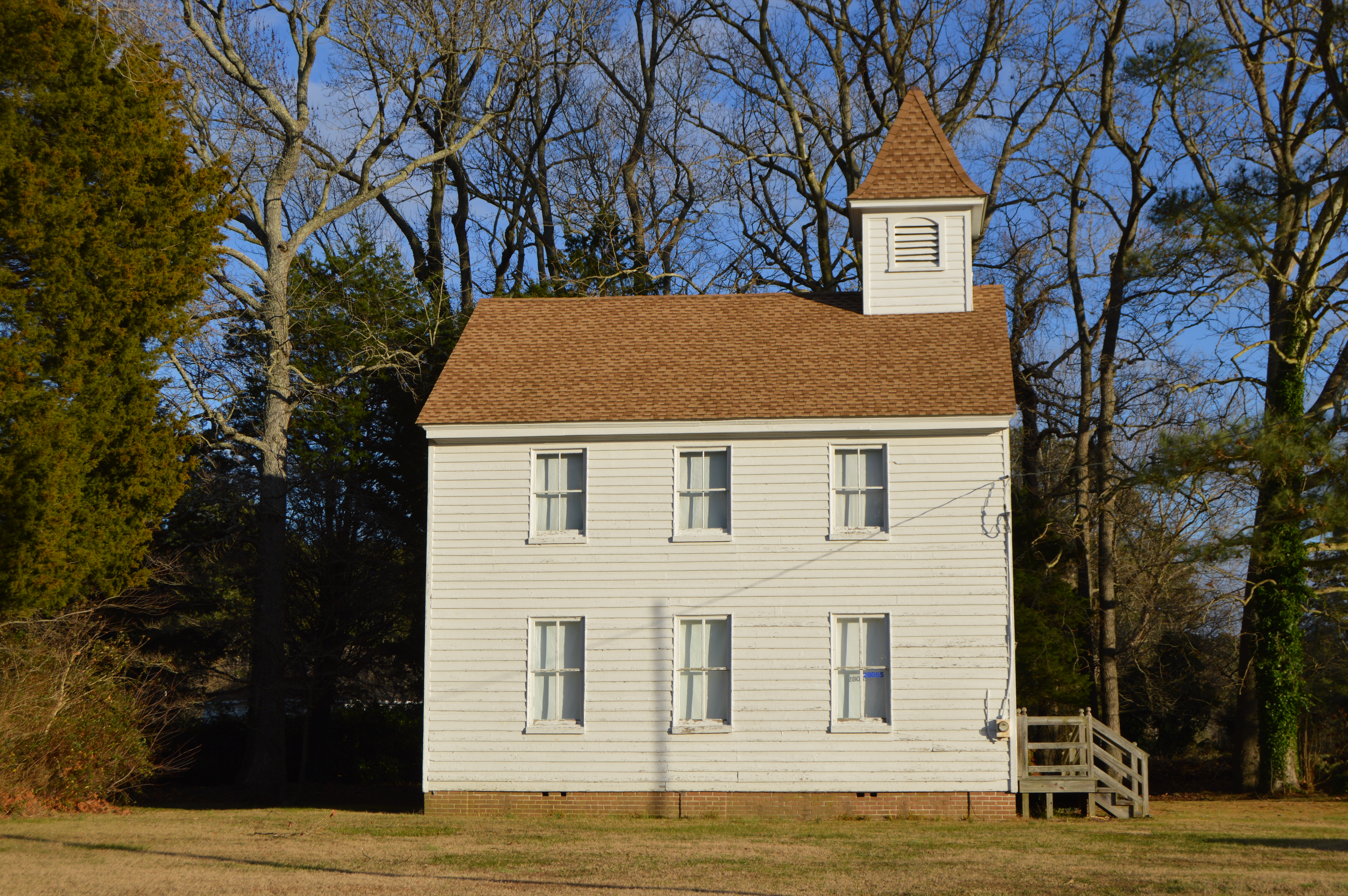

- Location within Virginia Location within the United States
- Location: 28055 Drummondtown Rd., Locustville, Virginia
- Coordinates: 37°39′29″N 75°40′30″W
- Area: less than one acre
- Built: 1859
- NRHP reference No.: 16000792
- Added to NRHP: November 22, 2016

The Locustville Academy is a historic school building at 28055 Drummondtown Road in Locustville, Virginia. It is a two-story wood-frame building, with a gabled roof and small square cupola with a flared roof and louvered belfry. Built in 1859, it is a well-preserved example of a mid-19th century rural academy building. It served as a private school from 1859 to 1879, and as a public school from 1908 to 1926, when the Accomack County schools were consolidated. It was added to the National Register of Historic Places in 2016.

== See also ==
- National Register of Historic Places listings in Accomack County, Virginia
