= Accomac Historic District =

Historic district in Virginia, US

- U.S. National Register of Historic Places
- U.S. Historic district
- Virginia Landmarks Register
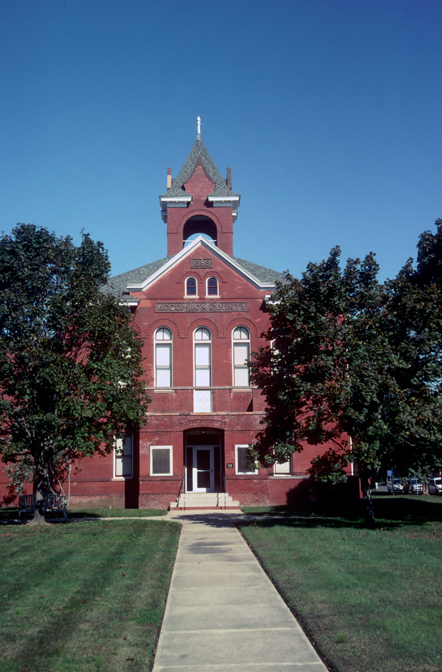
- Accomack County Courthouse (Built 1899), November 2006

- Location within Virginia Location within the United States
- Location: Business Rte. 13, Accomac, Virginia
- Coordinates: 37°43′11″N 75°40′11″W
- Area: 130 acres (53 ha)
- Built: 1690
- Architectural style: Greek Revival, Federal, Vernacular
- NRHP reference No.: 82004529
- VLR No.: 160-0020

Significant dates
- Added to NRHP: July 21, 1982
- Designated VLR: December 16, 1980

Accomac Historic District is a national historic district located at Accomac, Virginia, United States. The district encompasses 158 contributing buildings in the town of Accomac, mainly grouped into two periods of construction. From its founding in 1786 through the second quarter of the nineteenth century, several residential, commercial, governmental, and religious structures were built in the core of Accomac, representing both high-style and vernacular examples of late Georgian, Federal, and Greek Revival styles. Notable structures surviving from this period include the rectory of St. George's Episcopal Parish (1798, 1811); the Seymour House (1791–1815); Roseland (1750–1850); Seven Gables (1786–1905); Rural Hill (1816, 1835), and the Francis Makemie Presbyterian Church (1840). The second period of construction reflected in the town dates to the last quarter of the nineteenth century, when the arrival of the New York, Philadelphia, and Norfolk Railroad spawned renewed growth and economic prosperity in Accomack County following the Civil War. These buildings also display both high-style and vernacular expressions of Victorian era styles, including Second Empire, Italianate, Gothic Revival, and Romanesque. Notable structures from this time period include Bayly Memorial Hall (a former Baptist Church built in 1870 and later moved), the County Clerk's Office (1887), the Accomack County Courthouse (1899), and houses found in the Lilliston Avenue extension of the town built in the 1880s–1890s. There are also contributing structures dating from the first quarter of the twentieth century, including the Drummondtown Baptist Church (1914), Drummondtown United Methodist Church (1920), and the former hotel at the town square (1925).

There are three structures within the Accomac Historic District which are listed separately on the National Register of Historic Places. They are the Debtors' Prison, the Bank Building, and St. James Episcopal Church.

The Accomac Historic District was added to the National Register of Historic Places in 1992.

== History ==
The Virginia General Assembly in its October 1786 session enacted "that ten acres of land, the property of Richard Drummond, adjoining to Accomack courthouse...are hereby established a town, by the name of Drummond." The act establishing Drummondtown came over a century after the court of Accomack County has begun meeting at the site, first in the home or tavern of John Cole and then in a brick courthouse completed in 1756.
