= Pence-Carmichael Farm, Barn and Root Cellar =

- U.S. National Register of Historic Places
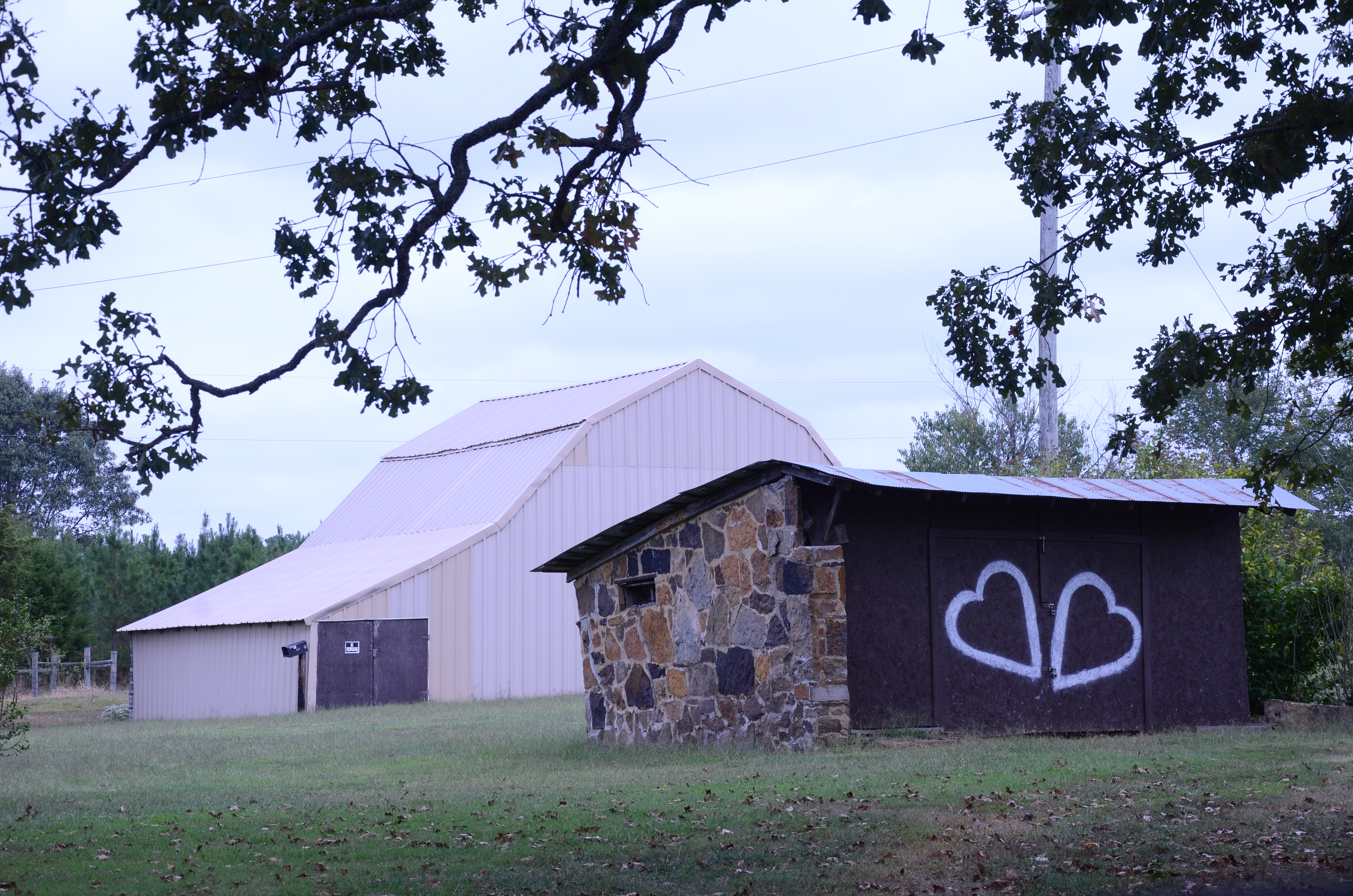

- Location within Arkansas Location within the United States
- Nearest city: Romance, Arkansas
- Coordinates: 35°14′29″N 92°2′25″W
- Area: 2 acres (0.81 ha)
- Built: 1910
- Architectural style: Vernacular agricultural
- MPS: White County MPS
- NRHP reference No.: 91001305
- Added to NRHP: July 20, 1992

The Pence-Carmichael Farm, Barn and Root Cellar are a pair of historic farm outbuildings in rural western White County, Arkansas. They are located just east of the hamlet of Romance, off Arkansas Highway 31 on Carmichael Lane. The barn is a two-story wood-frame structure, with a weatherboarded exterior and stone pier foundation. It has an unusual internal layout, with a transverse crib plan that has a cross-gabled drive, and a side shed extension. The root cellar is a single-story stone structure with a flat roof; it is one of the county's rare early 20th-century stone farm outbuildings.

The buildings were listed on the National Register of Historic Places in 1992.

== See also ==
- Wessells Root Cellar
- National Register of Historic Places listings in White County, Arkansas
