= Nick Boddie Williams =

American journalist (1906–1992)

Nick Boddie Williams (1906–1992), known as Nick B. Williams, was the editor of the Los Angeles Times from 1958 to 1971. He was also a science-fiction writer.

Williams was born in Onancock, Virginia, and studied at the University of Texas, where he earned a degree in government in 1929. He worked for the Fort Worth Star-Telegram, The Tennessean in Nashville and the Los Angeles Express before joining the Times in 1931 as a copy editor. He had a wife, Barbara, and they had three daughters, Susan Williams, Elliot Davis and Elizabeth Agajanian, and a son, Nick Van Boddie Williams Jr. He died at the age of 85 on July 1, 1992, in South Laguna, California.
