= Wessells Root Cellar =

- U.S. National Register of Historic Places
- Virginia Landmarks Register
- Location within Virginia Location within the United States
- Nearest city: Hallwood, Virginia
- Coordinates: 37°53′54″N 75°37′35″W
- Built: 1768
- Architect: William Vessells
- NRHP reference No.: 70000779
- VLR No.: 001-0076

Significant dates
- Added to NRHP: February 26, 1970
- Designated VLR: December 2, 1969

Wessells Root Cellar is a small brick structure near Hallwood, Accomack County, Virginia. The root cellar was built sometime after 1768 by William Vessells as a structure separate from the main house, which burned in 1937. The cellar is of fine quality and has remained in the Wessells family for more than two hundred years. A decorative header pattern in the gable using overfired brick is an unusual detail.

== See also ==
- National Register of Historic Places listings in Accomack County, Virginia
- Pence-Carmichael Farm, Barn and Root Cellar
