= Ker Place =

Historic house in Virginia, United States

- U.S. National Register of Historic Places
- U.S. Historic district – Contributing property
- Virginia Landmarks Register
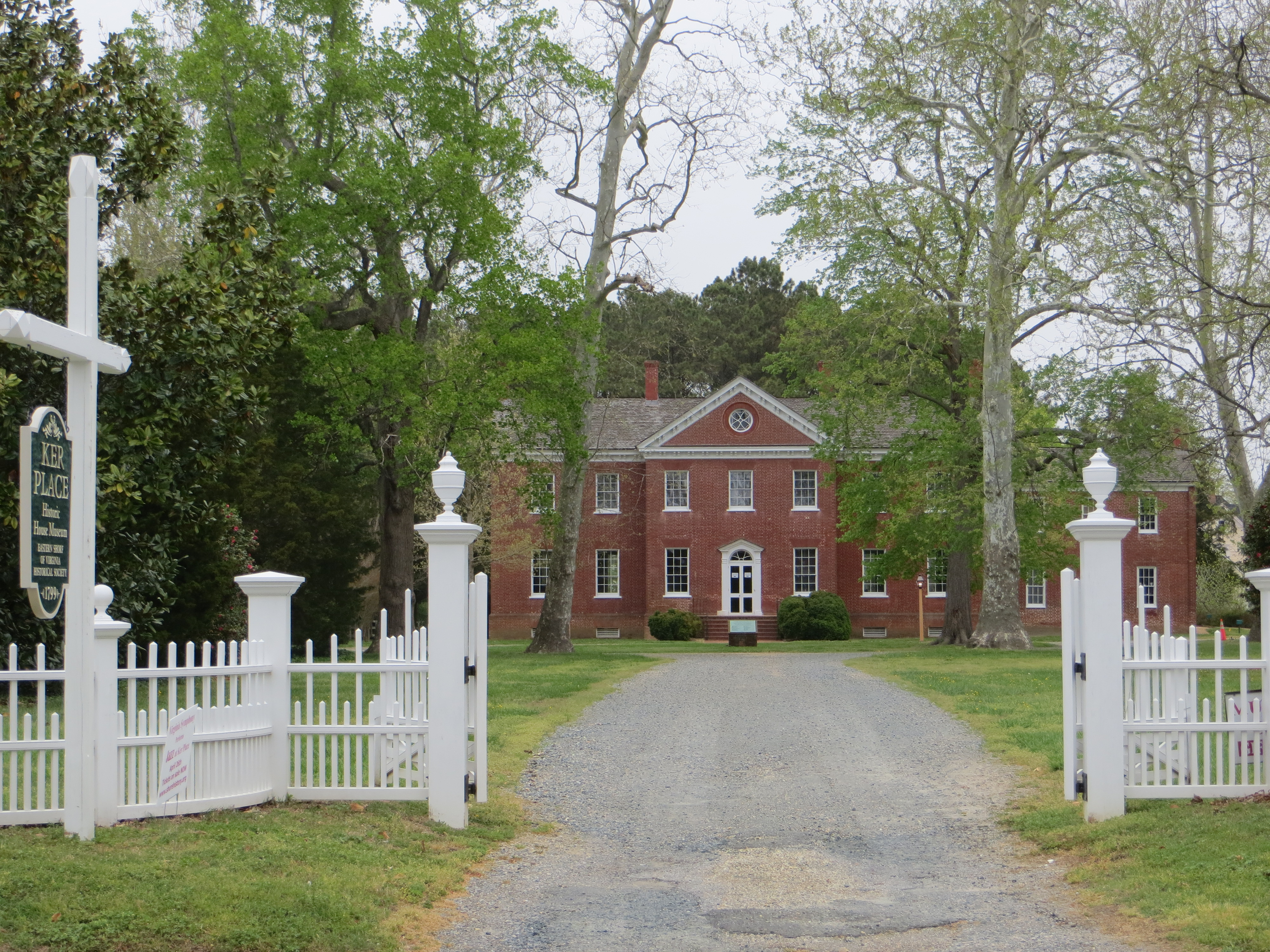
- Entrance to Ker Place, April 2013

- Location within Virginia Location within the United States
- Location: NE corner of Crockett Ave. and Market St., Onancock, Virginia
- Coordinates: 37°42′46″N 75°44′50″W
- Area: 2 acres (0.81 ha)
- Built: 1799
- Architectural style: Federal
- NRHP reference No.: 70000780
- VLR No.: 273-0003

Significant dates
- Added to NRHP: February 26, 1970
- Designated VLR: December 02, 1969

Ker Place, sometimes spelled Kerr Place, is a historic home located at Onancock, Accomack County, Virginia. It was built in 1799, and is a two-story, five-bay rectangular Federal-style dwelling with a central projecting pedimented pavilion on both the front and rear elevations. It has a cross-gable roof and a two-story wing which originally was a 1 1/2-story kitchen connected to the house by a hyphen. In 1960, the house and two acres of land were acquired by, and made the headquarters of the Eastern Shore of Virginia Historical Society, which operates it as an early 19th-century historic house museum.

The first owner was John Shepherd Ker, a native of Accomack County, Virginia, son of Edward Ker, a native of Cessford, Scotland and Margaret Shepherd, from Northampton County, Virginia. It was added to the National Register of Historic Places in 1970. It is located in the Onancock Historic District.

== Gallery ==
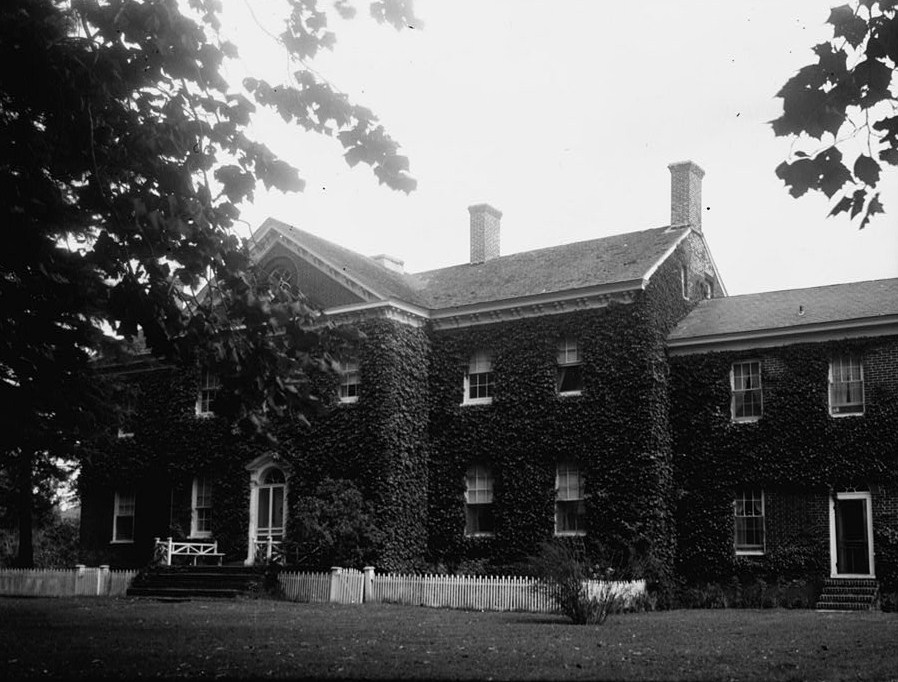
Ker Place, HABS photo
