= Sanford, Virginia =

- Census-designated place
- Location in Accomack County and the state of Virginia.
- Coordinates: 37°55′48″N 75°39′43″W
- Country: United States
- State: Virginia
- County: Accomack
- Elevation: 3 ft (0.91 m)

Population (2020)
  - Total: 168
- Time zone: UTC−5 (Eastern (EST))
  - Summer (DST): UTC−4 (EDT)
- FIPS code: 51-48776
- GNIS feature ID: 2584912

Sanford is a census-designated place (CDP) in Accomack County, Virginia, United States. It was first listed as a CDP in 2010. Per the 2020 census, the population was 168.

Pocomoke Farm was added to the National Register of Historic Places in 2007.

== Geography ==
The CDP lies at an elevation of 3 feet.

== Demographics ==
Historical population
Census	Pop.	Note	%±
2010	212		—
2020	168		−20.8%
U.S. Decennial Census; 2010 2020

Sanford was first listed as a census designated place in the 2010 U.S. census.

=== 2020 census ===
Sanford CDP, Virginia – Racial and ethnic composition Note: the US Census treats Hispanic/Latino as an ethnic category. This table excludes Latinos from the racial categories and assigns them to a separate category. Hispanics/Latinos may be of any race.
Race / Ethnicity (NH = Non-Hispanic)	Pop 2010	Pop 2020	% 2010	% 2020
White alone (NH)	181	136	85.38%	80.95%
Black or African American alone (NH)	21	9	9.91%	5.36%
Native American or Alaska Native alone (NH)	0	0	0.00%	0.00%
Asian alone (NH)	1	1	0.47%	0.60%
Pacific Islander alone (NH)	0	0	0.00%	0.00%
Some Other Race alone (NH)	0	0	0.00%	0.00%
Mixed Race or Multi-Racial (NH)	1	2	0.47%	1.19%
Hispanic or Latino (any race)	8	20	3.77%	11.90%
Total	212	168	100.00%	100.00%
