= Pocomoke Farm =

Historic cemetery in Virginia, United States

- U.S. National Register of Historic Places
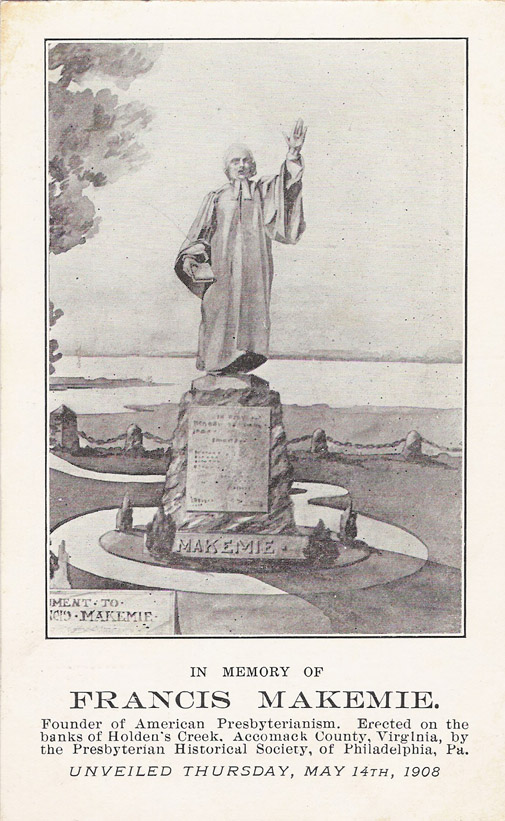
- Monument upon its erection

- Location within Virginia Location within the United States
- Nearest city: Sanford, Virginia
- Coordinates: 37°55′57″N 75°38′8″W
- Area: 3.6 acres (1.5 ha)
- Built: 1681
- NRHP reference No.: 07000054
- Added to NRHP: February 15, 2007

Pocomoke Farm, now known as the Makemie Monument Park, is a historic site in rural Accomack County, on Virginia's Eastern Shore. The site is the location of the home and family cemetery of Francis Makemie (1658–1708), acknowledged as a founding leader of Presbyterianism in America. Now maintained as a park in honor of Makemie, the site includes a marker built in 1907 from building bricks and cemetery wall remnants found in the area.

The site was listed on the National Register of Historic Places in 2007.

== See also ==
- National Register of Historic Places listings in Accomack County, Virginia
