= Edmund Bayly House =

Historic house in Virginia, US

- U.S. National Register of Historic Places
- Virginia Landmarks Register
- Location within Virginia Location within the United States
- Location: VA 615, Craddockville, Virginia
- Coordinates: 37°34′28″N 75°53′30″W
- Area: 6 acres (2.4 ha)
- Built: 1769–1787
- Architectural style: Colonial
- NRHP reference No.: 82004530
- VLR No.: 001-0021

Significant dates
- Added to NRHP: June 28, 1982
- Designated VLR: November 18, 1980, May 17, 2007

Edmund Bayly House, also known as Hermitage, is a historic home located at Craddockville, Accomack County, Virginia. It was built in two stages between 1769 and 1787, and is a 1 1/2-story, five-bay, brick-ended frame house. It has a gable roof with dormers. The interior features fine Georgian woodwork, including an impressive parlor chimney piece with flanking cupboards, and a handsome stair. Also on the property are a contributing kitchen outbuilding, renovated for use as a guest house, and a shed.

It was added to the National Register of Historic Places in 1982.
