= Bowman's Folly =

Historic house in Virginia, United States

- U.S. National Register of Historic Places
- Virginia Landmarks Register
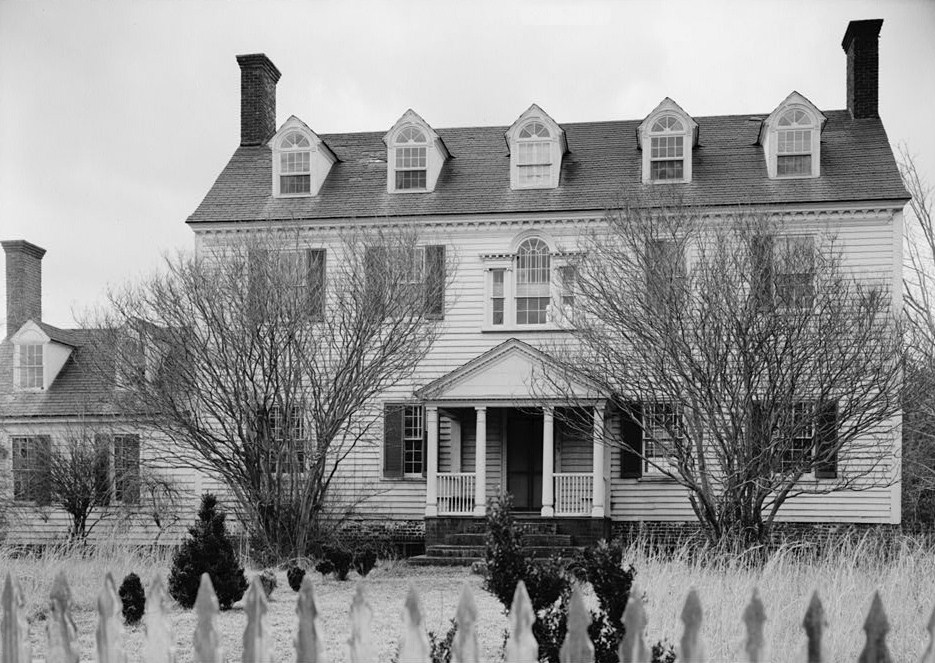
- Bowman's Folly, HABS Photo

- Location within Virginia Location within the United States
- Location: SE of jct. of Rtes. 652 and 13, near Accomac, Virginia
- Coordinates: 37°42′27″N 75°37′13″W
- Area: 0 acres (0 ha)
- Built: c. 1815
- NRHP reference No.: 69000216
- VLR No.: 001-0002

Significant dates
- Added to NRHP: November 12, 1969
- Designated VLR: May 13, 1969

Bowman's Folly, is a historic home located near Accomac, Accomack County, Virginia. Captain Edmund Bowman patented the land in 1664, the current structure was built about 1815 by General John Cropper Jr., who had been born in the house in 1755 (his mother being Bowman's daughter and heir). Cropper ordered it demolished and a grander building erected after construction of a hill to allow better vistas during the War of 1812. The current building has a 2 1/2-story, main block with a 1 1/2-story wing. The main block has brick ends with interior end chimneys and frame fronts on the north and south. It has a64 gable roof with dormers. The front facade features a Palladian window and pedimented entrance porch. Also on the property are a frame kitchen, now connected to the main house by a hyphen; frame dovecote, and frame privy.

The house has the name of Edmund Bowman; he regretted his decision to locate at the swampy site in the 1660s (hence the suffix "Folly") after his son died of disease. Although the house has been rebuilt, its name still recalls the pioneer incident. The present house was added to the National Register of Historic Places in 1974.
