= Hopkins and Brother Store =

Historic commercial building in Virginia, United States

- U.S. National Register of Historic Places
- U.S. Historic district – Contributing property
- Virginia Landmarks Register
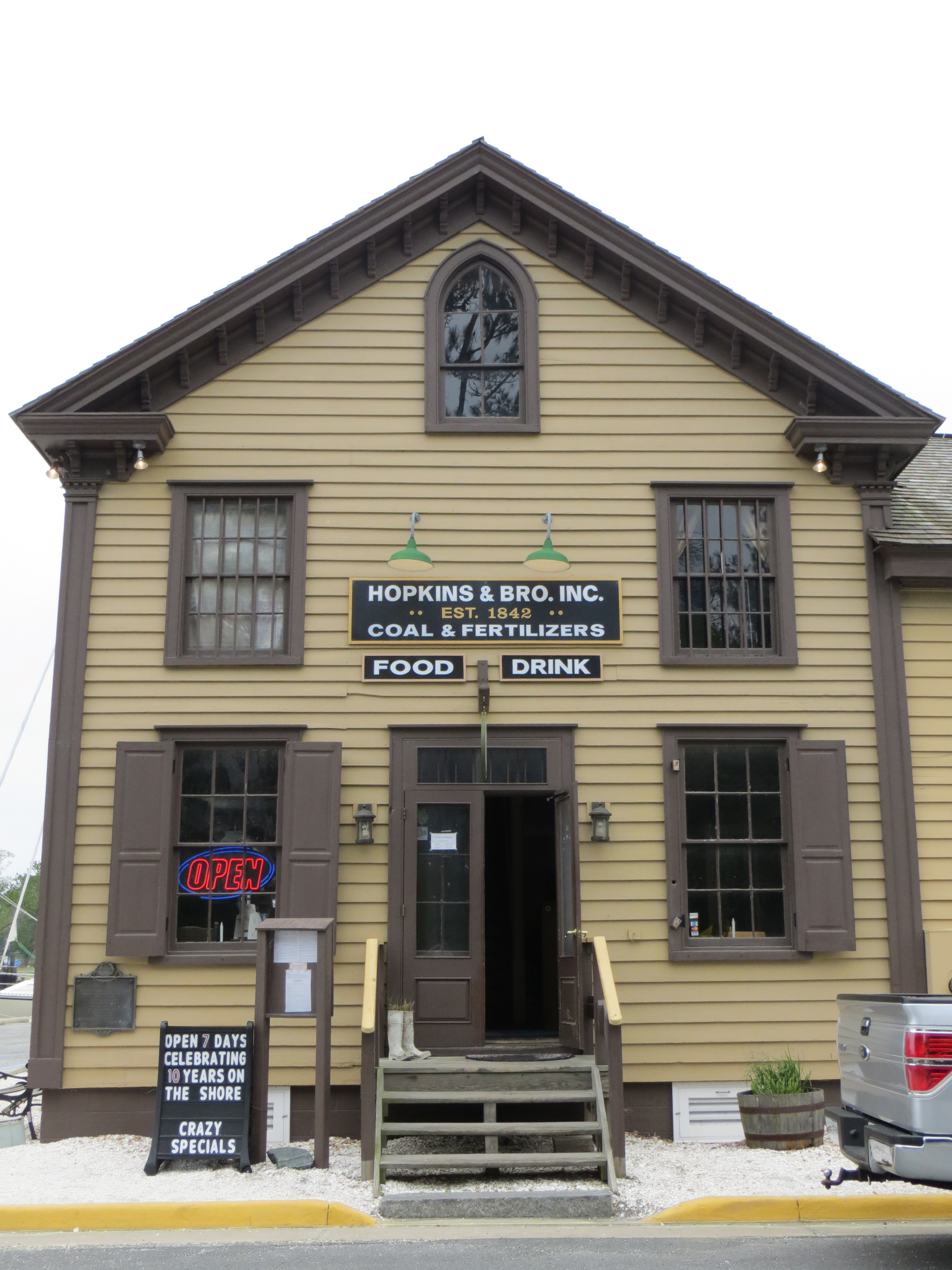
- Hopkins and Brother Store, April 2013

- Location within Virginia Location within the United States
- Location: Market St., Onancock, Virginia
- Coordinates: 37°42′44″N 75°45′20″W
- Area: less than one acre
- Built: 1842
- Part of: Onancock Historic District (ID92001266)
- NRHP reference No.: 69000217
- VLR No.: 273-0002

Significant dates
- Added to NRHP: November 12, 1969
- Designated CP: October 8, 1992
- Designated VLR: May 13, 1969

Hopkins and Brother Store is a historic commercial building located at Onancock, Accomack County, Virginia. It is a simple frame structure consisting of a two-storey block with a slightly lower two-storey ell and lean-to. The building features corner pilasters, a bracketed cornice, and one "Gothic" window in the attic. Hopkins and Brother was founded in 1842 by Captain Stephen Hopkins. The business remained in the hands of the Hopkins family until it was discontinued in 1965. The business served as one of the commercial and maritime trading centers of the Eastern Shore. Detailed records of the store exist from 1839 to 1965 and have been donated to the Virginia Historical Society.

It was added to the National Register of Historic Places in 1969. It is located in the Onancock Historic District.

The store is currently a restaurant, Mallards at the Wharf.
