= Onancock, Virginia =

- Town
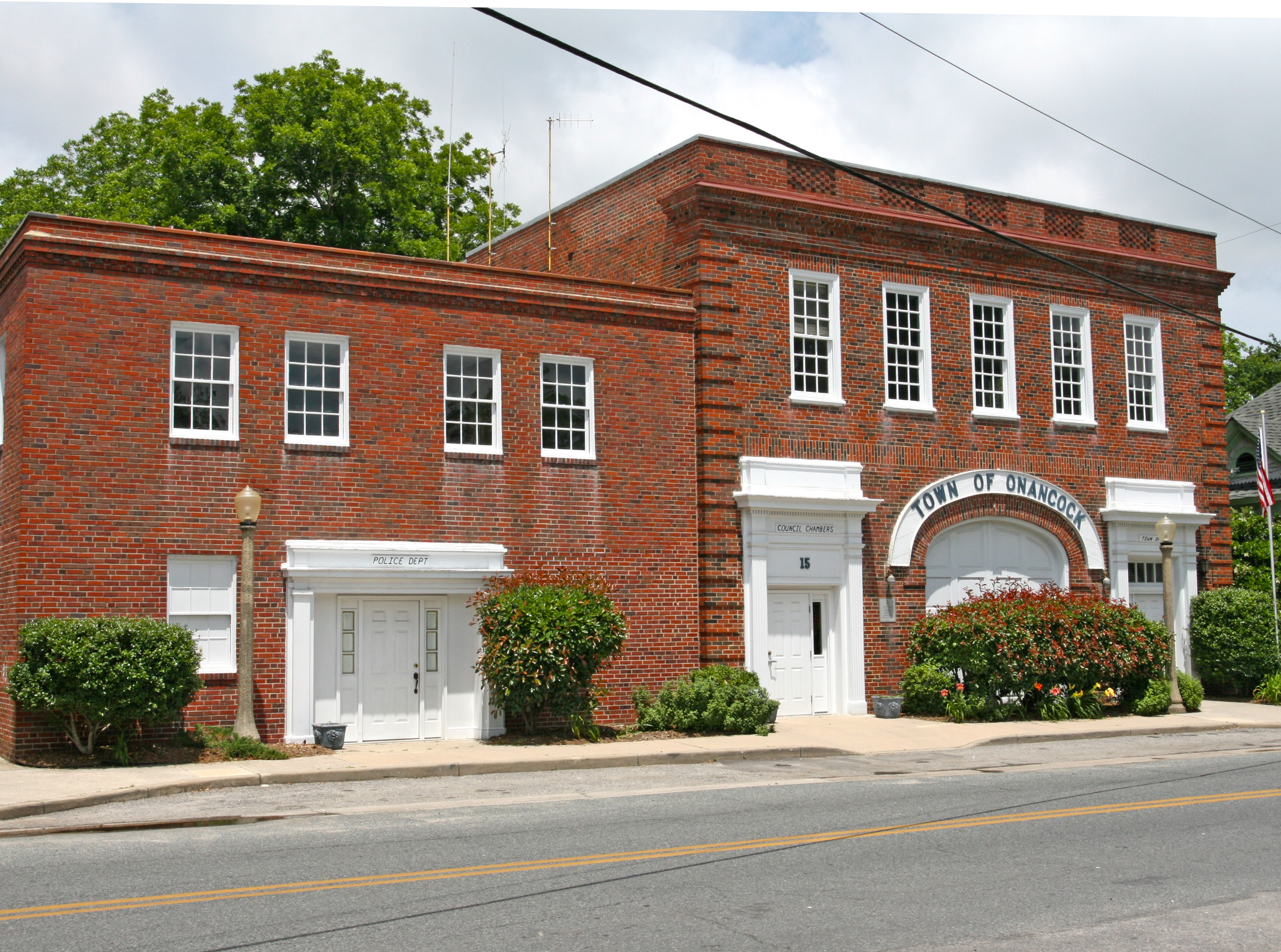
- The Town Hall and Police Department of Onancock

- Location in Accomack County and the state of Virginia.
- Coordinates: 37°42′38″N 75°44′47″W
- Country: United States
- State: Virginia
- County: Accomack

Area
  - Total: 1.05 sq mi (2.72 km^{2})
  - Land: 1.05 sq mi (2.71 km^{2})
  - Water: 0 sq mi (0.00 km^{2})
- Elevation: 16 ft (4.9 m)

Population (2020)
  - Total: 1,169
  - Estimate (2019): 1,211
  - Density: 1,157.2/sq mi (446.78/km^{2})
- Time zone: UTC−5 (Eastern (EST))
  - Summer (DST): UTC−4 (EDT)
- ZIP Code: 23417
- Area codes: 757, 948
- FIPS code: 51-59336
- GNIS feature ID: 1493376
- Website: www.onancock.com

Onancock (/oʊˈnænkɒk/ oh-NAN-kok) is a town in Accomack County, Virginia, United States. As of the 2020 census, Onancock had a population of 1,169.

== History ==
According to a nearby Virginia state highway marker, Onancock was founded in 1680. A courthouse was established some years after, and militia barracks established during the Revolution.

Some thirteen months after Cornwallis' October 1781 surrender at Yorktown, Commodore Zedechiah Whaley sought aid from Onancock during a naval campaign against British barges of war that had been harassing the shores and farms of Chesapeake Bay. On November 28, 1782, he sailed up Onancock Creek and appealed to Lt. Colonel John Cropper, who rounded up 25 local men in support. They boarded Whaley's flagship, Protector, and continued his siege upon the British flotilla.

In what became the Battle of Kedges Strait three out of four of Whaley's barges turned back under heavy British fire, leaving the Protector alone to press on with the fight. Vastly outnumbered, ultimately 25 of its 65 men were killed or wounded, 29 captured, and only 11 escaped during a climactic action on November 30. Whaley surrendered—in the last naval action of the Revolution—on the very day the Treaty of Paris seeking to finally end the hostilities between the two nations was drafted. It would be another year and a half yet until the completed treaty was signed, ratified, and exchanged, ultimately becoming effective on May 12, 1784.

The highway marker also indicates that the home of Virginia governor Henry A. Wise (1856–60), Onley, is nearby.

In the mid-19th century, Onancock was a point along the stagecoach route between Wilmington, Delaware and Eastville, Virginia.

The Onancock Historic District, Cokesbury Church, Hopkins and Brother Store, and Ker Place are listed on the National Register of Historic Places.

== Geography ==
According to the United States Census Bureau, the town has a total area of 1.0 square mile (2.7 km^{2}), all land.

It lies at an elevation of 16 feet, and is on the Eastern Shore of Virginia.

== Demographics ==
Historical population
| Census | Pop. | Note | %± |
|---|---|---|---|
| 1900 | 938 | | — |
| 1910 | 1,001 | | 6.7% |
| 1920 | 1,074 | | 7.3% |
| 1930 | 1,245 | | 15.9% |
| 1940 | 1,283 | | 3.1% |
| 1950 | 1,353 | | 5.5% |
| 1960 | 1,759 | | 30.0% |
| 1970 | 1,614 | | −8.2% |
| 1980 | 1,461 | | −9.5% |
| 1990 | 1,434 | | −1.8% |
| 2000 | 1,525 | | 6.3% |
| 2010 | 1,263 | | −17.2% |
| 2020 | 1,169 | | −7.4% |
U.S. Decennial Census

At the 2000 census there were 1,525 people, 656 households, and 392 families living in the town. The population density was 1,452.3 people per square mile (560.8/km^{2}). There were 733 housing units at an average density of 698.0 per square mile (269.5/km^{2}). The racial makeup of the town was 66.43% White, 31.41% African American, 0.46% Native American, 0.07% Asian, 0.66% from other races, and 0.98% from two or more races. Hispanic or Latino of any race were 2.89%.

Of the 656 households 23.6% had children under the age of 18 living with them, 41.3% were married couples living together, 16.3% had a female householder with no husband present, and 40.1% were non-families. 38.0% of households were one person and 24.7% were one person aged 65 or older. The average household size was 2.19 and the average family size was 2.82.

The age distribution was 21.2% under the age of 18, 6.8% from 18 to 24, 21.6% from 25 to 44, 24.1% from 45 to 64, and 26.3% 65 or older. The median age was 45 years. For every 100 females, there were 80.3 males. For every 100 females aged 18 and over, there were 73.1 males.

The median household income was $28,214 and the median family income was $37,039. Males had a median income of $25,956 versus $19,250 for females. The per capita income for the town was $18,393. About 8.4% of families and 15.3% of the population were below the poverty line, including 20.4% of those under age 18 and 15.6% of those age 65 or over.

== Transportation ==
=== Major highway ===
- SR 179

=== Public transportation ===
STAR Transit provides public transit services, linking Onancock with Onley and other communities in Accomack and Northampton counties on the Eastern Shore.

== Notable people ==
- Barbara Bohannan-Sheppard - mayor of Chester, Pennsylvania
- Josh Nolz - professional soccer player.
- Nick Boddie Williams - editor of the Los Angeles Times from 1958 to 1971.
- George D. Wise - U.S. Representative from Virginia.
