= Pitts Neck =

Historic house in Virginia, United States

- U.S. National Register of Historic Places
- Virginia Landmarks Register
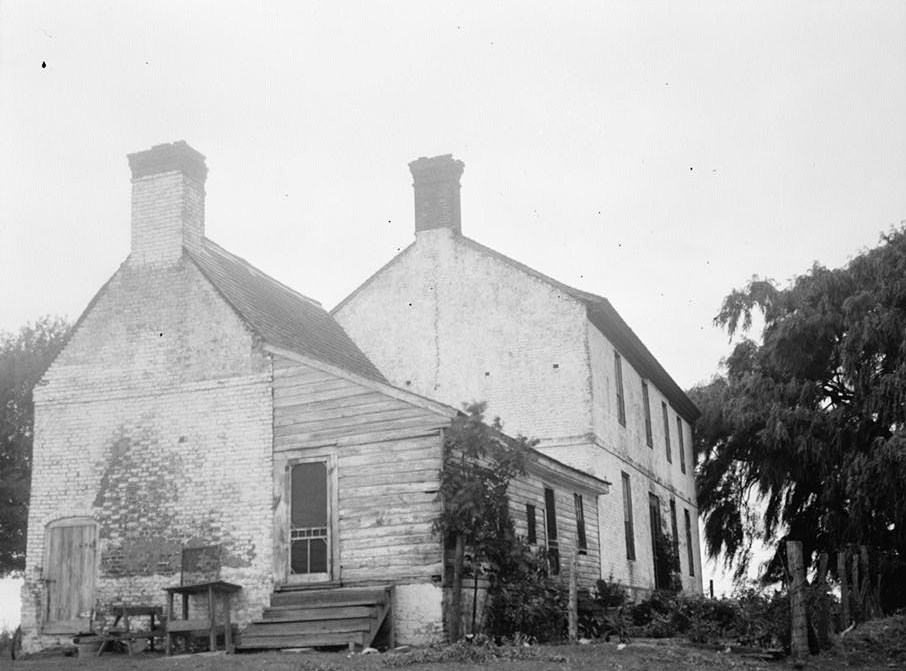
- Pitts Neck Farm, HABS Photo

- Location within Virginia Location within the United States
- Location: 6 mi. W of New Church on VA 709, near New Church, Virginia
- Coordinates: 37°58′08″N 75°37′46″W
- Area: 170 acres (69 ha)
- Built: c. 1700, c. 1725
- NRHP reference No.: 76002088
- VLR No.: 001-0038

Significant dates
- Added to NRHP: October 21, 1976
- Designated VLR: February 17, 1976

Pitts Neck, also known as Pitts Neck Farm, is a historic home located near New Church, Accomack County, Virginia. It consists of a two-story, five-bay, brick main block connected to a 1 1/2-story, two-bay frame wing connected by a hyphen. The wing dates to the beginning of the 18th century and the main block to about 25–30 years later. The main block has a central passage plan and is topped by a shallow gable roof. It features a scrolled soffit of its molded brick doorway.

It was added to the National Register of Historic Places in 1976.
