= Craddockville, Virginia =

Unincorporated community in Virginia, United States

Coordinates: 37°34′54″N 75°52′08″W

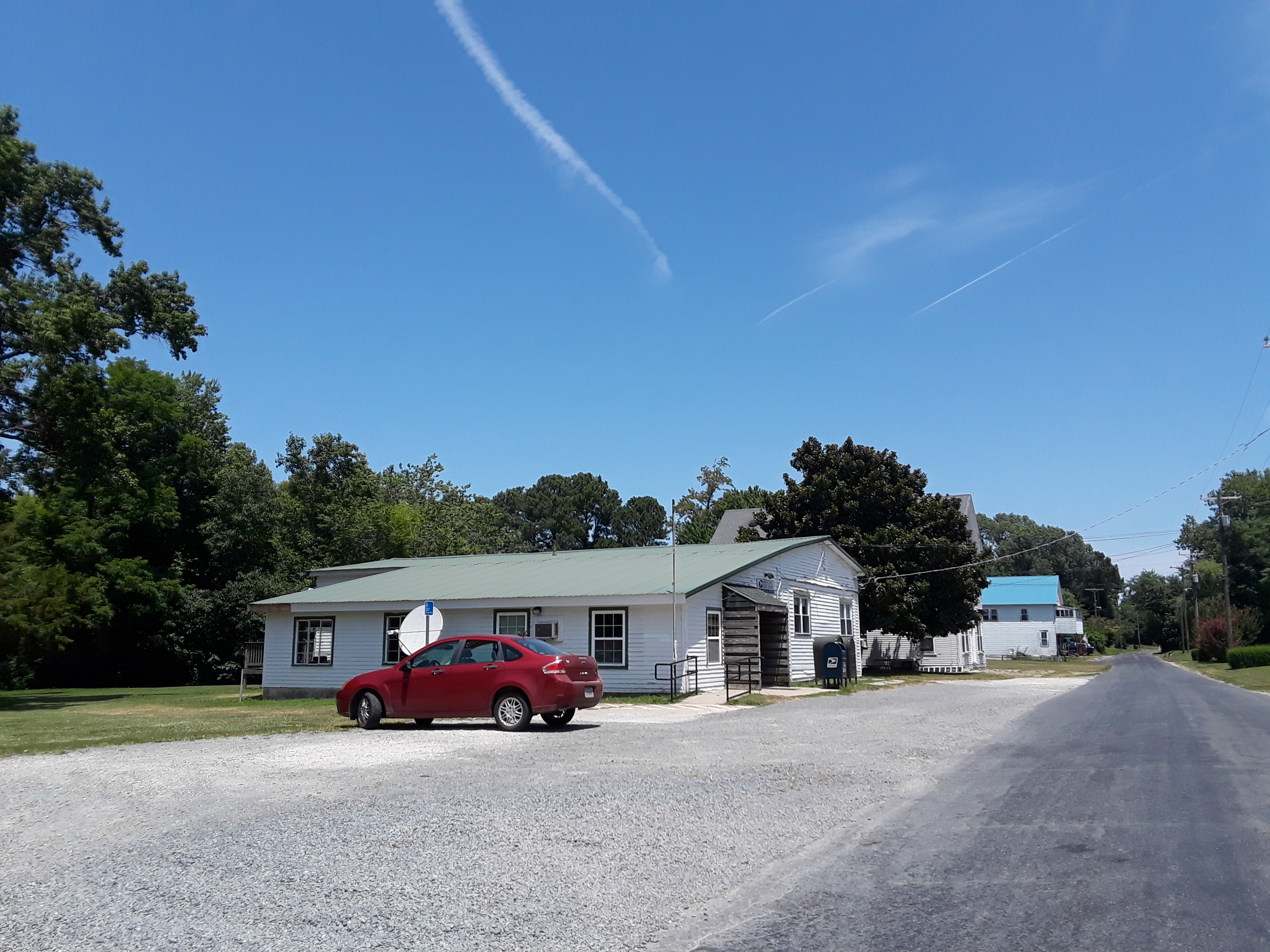
Craddockville's post office in July 2018

Craddockville is an unincorporated community in Accomack County, Virginia, United States.

The Edmund Bayly House was added to the National Register of Historic Places in 1974.
