= Onancock Historic District =

Historic district in Virginia, United States

- U.S. National Register of Historic Places
- U.S. Historic district
- Virginia Landmarks Register
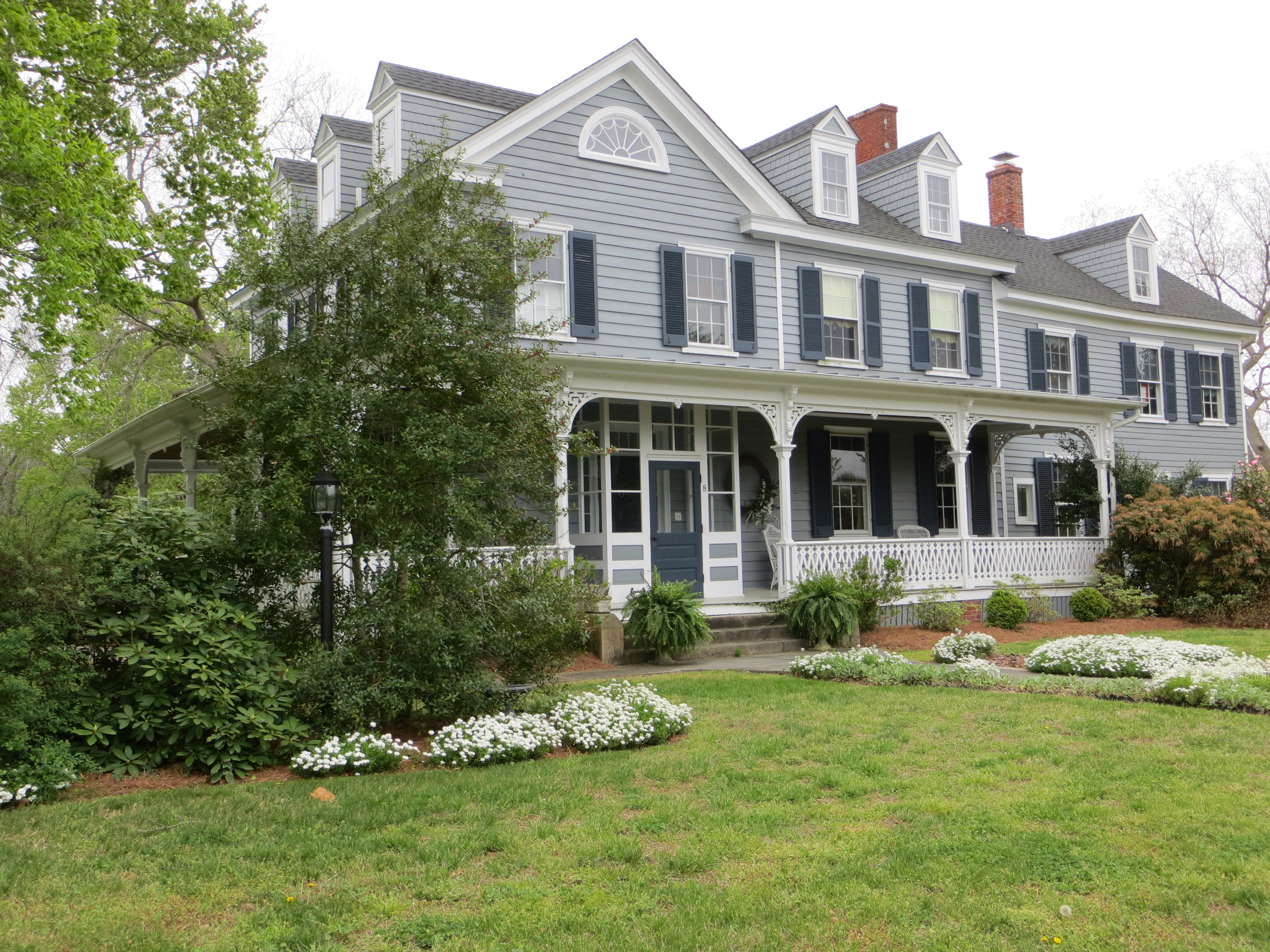
- Hopkins-Beechlawn house, Onancock Historic District, April 2013

- Location within Virginia Location within the United States
- Location: Roughly bounded by Joynes Branch, Onancock Cr. and Lake, Kerr, Jackson, Market, Justice, Johnson and Holly Sts., Onancock, Virginia
- Coordinates: 37°42′42″N 75°44′46″W
- Area: 225 acres (91 ha)
- Architect: Cassell, Charles E.; Et al.
- Architectural style: Late Victorian, Greek Revival, Federal
- NRHP reference No.: 92001266
- VLR No.: 273-0001

Significant dates
- Added to NRHP: October 8, 1992
- Designated VLR: April 22, 1992

Onancock Historic District is a national historic district located at Onancock, Accomack County, Virginia. The district encompasses 267 contributing buildings, 2 contributing sites, and 2 contributing objects. It includes most of the historic residential, commercial, and ecclesiastical buildings in the town of Onancock. The buildings represent a variety of popular architectural styles including the Late Victorian, Greek Revival, and Federal styles. Notable buildings include Scott Hall (1778, 1921), Alicia Hopkins House (1830), Harmon House (c. 1825), Holly House (1860), Ingleside (1880s), Dr. Lewis Harmanson House (1899), Harbor Breeze (1912), First National Bank (1894, 1899, 1921), Roseland Theatre (c. 1940), Market Street Methodist Church (1882), Naomi Makemie Presbyterian Church (1895), the Charles E. Cassell designed Holy Trinity Episcopal Church (1882), Onancock Town Hall (c. 1930), Onancock High School (1921), and Onancock Post Office (1936). Located in the district and separately listed are the Cokesbury Church, Hopkins and Brother Store and Ker Place.

It was added to the National Register of Historic Places in 1992.
