= Arbuckle Place =

Historic house in Virginia, US

- U.S. National Register of Historic Places
- Virginia Landmarks Register
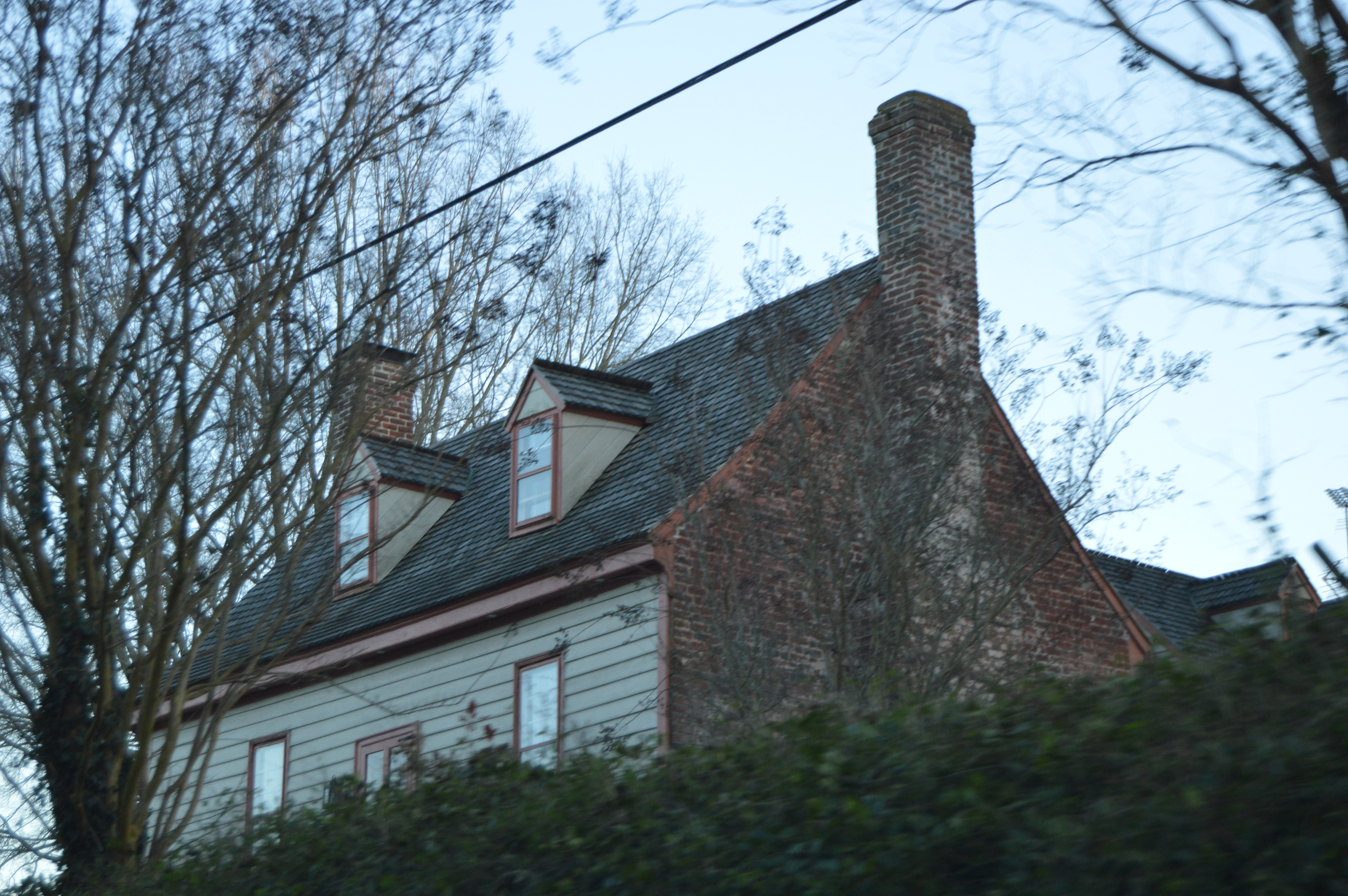
- Front and western end

- Location within Virginia Location within the United States
- Location: Seaside Rd./VA 679, Assawoman, Virginia
- Coordinates: 37°52′27″N 75°31′38″W
- Area: 1 acre (0.40 ha)
- Built: 1774
- Built by: Stockly, Alexander; Wharton, T.
- NRHP reference No.: 86001136
- VLR No.: 001-0066

Significant dates
- Added to NRHP: May 22, 1986
- Designated VLR: December 17, 1985

Arbuckle Place is a historic home located at Assawoman, Virginia, United States. It was built in 1774, and has a 1 1/2-story, hall and parlor plan dwelling with brick ends and frame front and back. It has a steep gable roof. The interior features complex paneling with built in cupboards and original doors and hardware. The house is a rare survivor of a once common Eastern Shore form, the small brick end house.

It was added to the National Register of Historic Places in 1986.
