= Locustville, Virginia =

Unincorporated community in Virginia, United States

Coordinates: 37°39′13″N 75°40′42″W

Locustville is an unincorporated community in Accomack County, Virginia, United States. The postal code for Locustville is 23404. The Locustville Academy, constructed in 1859, was added to the National Register of Historic Places in 2016.
