= St. James Church (Accomac, Virginia) =

Historic church in Virginia, US

- U.S. National Register of Historic Places
- U.S. Historic district – Contributing property
- Virginia Landmarks Register
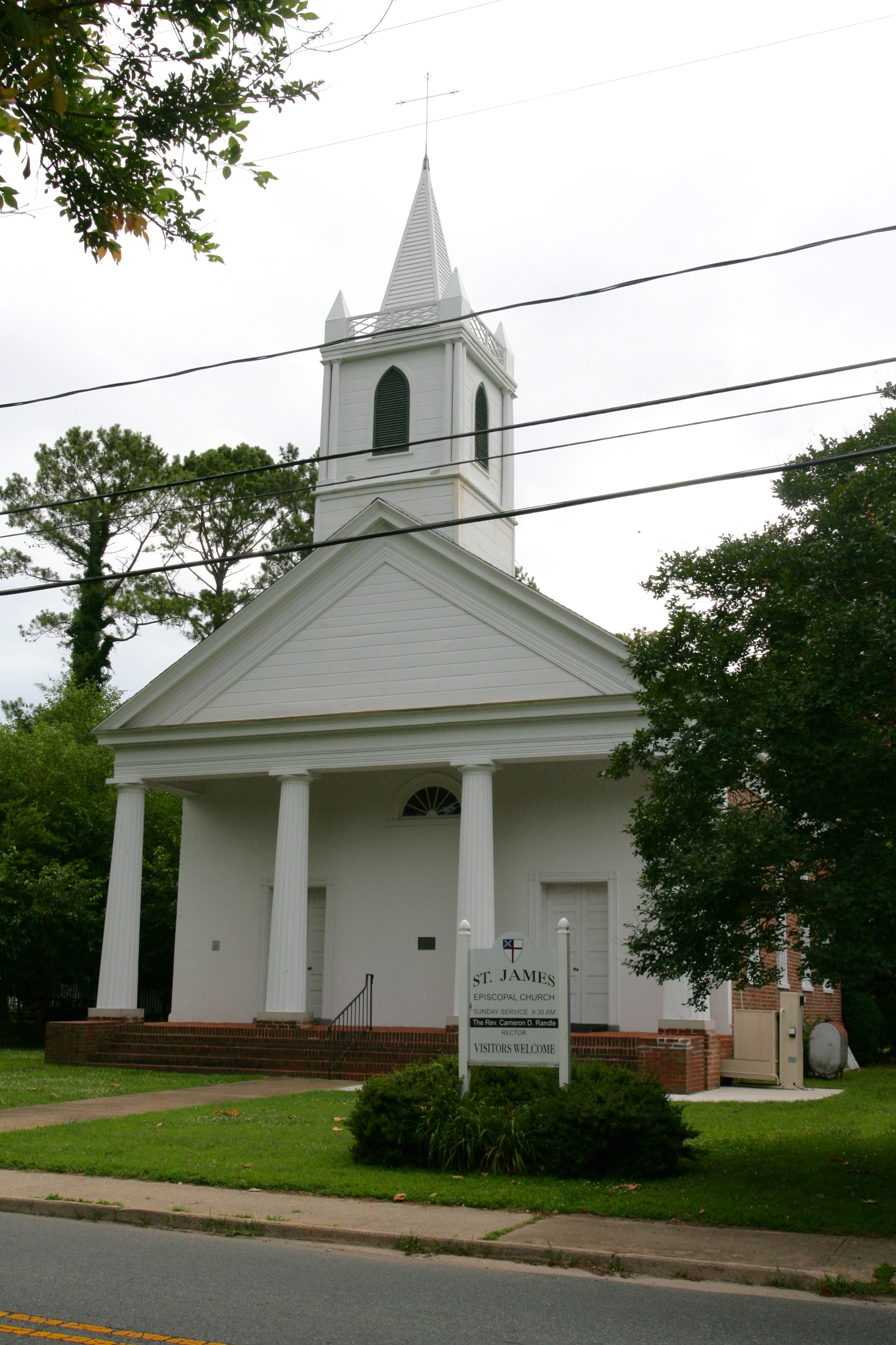

- Location within Virginia Location within the United States
- Location: Drummontown Rd. between Back St. and Ocean Hwy., Accomac, Virginia
- Coordinates: 37.717494°N 75.672298°W
- Area: less than one acre
- Built: 1838
- Architect: Potts
- Architectural style: Greek Revival
- NRHP reference No.: 69000215
- VLR No.: 160-0005

Significant dates
- Added to NRHP: June 11, 1969
- Designated VLR: November 5, 1968

St. James Church is a historic Episcopal Church on Drummondtown Road near Back Street in Accomac, Virginia, United States. Originally established as a chapel of ease for Accomack Parish in the seventeenth century, the present St. James Church was erected in 1838 as the town then known as Drummondtown grew as the county seat (and renamed Accomac in 1892). In recognition of its Greek Revival design and interior trompe-l'oeil frescos, St. James Church was listed on the National Register of Historic Places in 1969. It is also a contributing building of the Accomac Historic District which was created in 1992.

== History ==
Accomack Parish of the Anglican (Episcopal) Church was separated from Hungars Parish in 1663. St. James Church was originally established as a chapel of ease for Accomack Parish to serve congregants living in southeastern Accomack County. The original church, constructed of brick in Georgian style, was completed in 1767. It stood near the present-day town of Onley, Virginia. About twenty years after the construction of the first St. James Church, Drummondtown) was chartered by the Virginia General Assembly and established as the county seat for Accomack County. As the town developed in the early-19th century, St. James' parishioners decided to move their church closer to the county seat. Drummondtown had two thriving hotels, as well as a Methodist and Presbyterian churches, furniture and hat-making factories, stores and houses.

Land was purchased in 1838 and construction began with some bricks from the original church. The new church was designed in the popular Greek Revival style and laid out in the low-church style typical of Episcopal Churches in the first half of the nineteenth century. This plan can still be seen in the church today, which has two doors leading into two aisles inside the church and a central platform which was originally the site of the pulpit. A vesting room was constructed at the center of the back wall of the church. The vestry commissioned traveling artist Jean G. Potts to fresco the church's interior walls and ceiling. The artist, a master of the trompe-l'oeil ("fool the eye") style, created a chancel designed to make the church seem deeper, and also decorated the walls with simulated pilasters, moulding, and raised-panel walls.

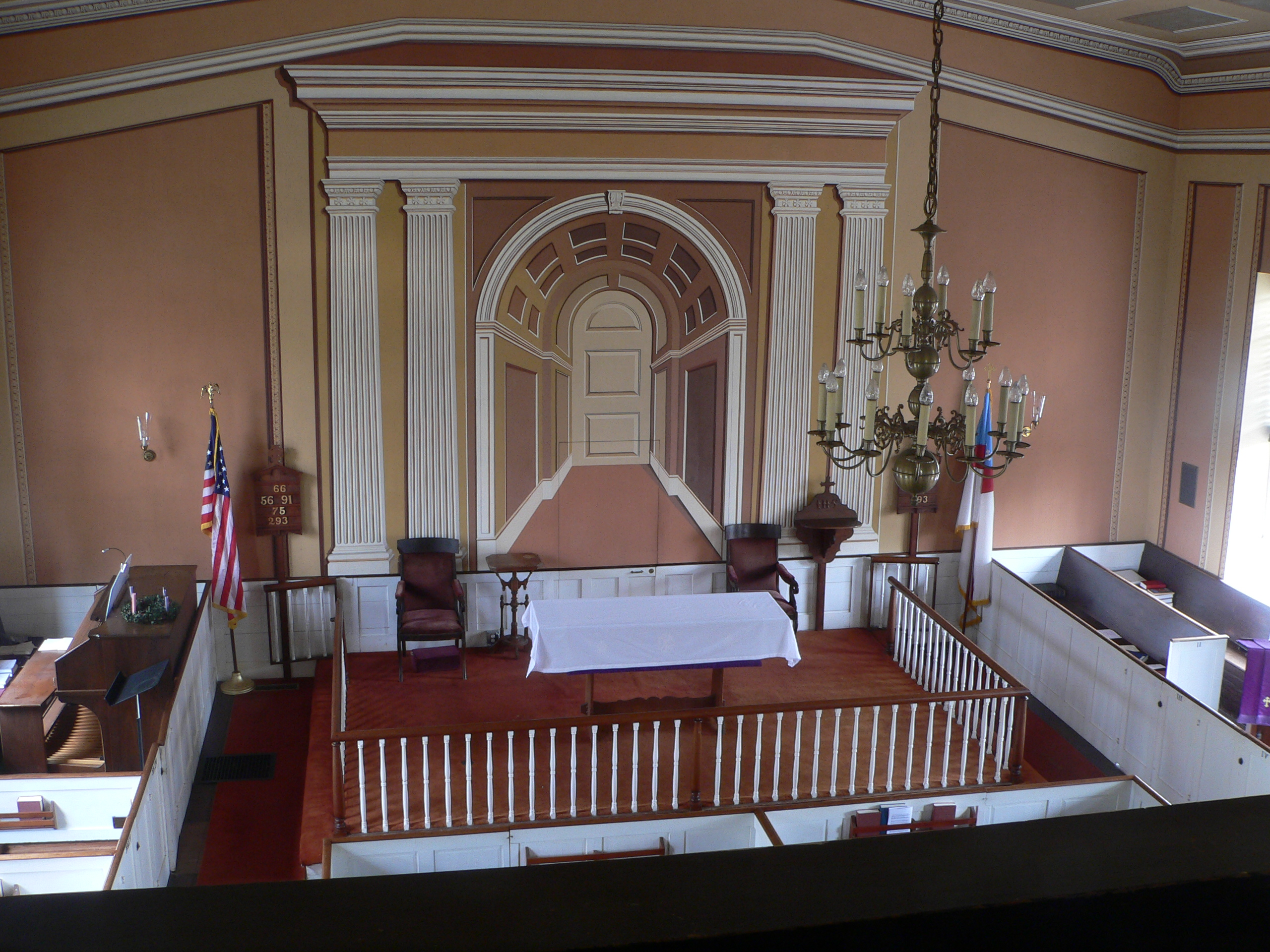
interior view

The town flourished in the 1840s and by 1860 hosted the first newspaper published on the Eastern Shore. This was the home parish of Henry A. Wise, a prominent lawyer who served as U.S. Minister to Brazil, and Virginia's 33rd governor (from 1856 until 1860). His birthplace remains visible from the church's back lawn. Wise's first two wives came from Pennsylvania, and the sister of his second wife (who died of childbirth complications in 1850) married an army officer who became Union General George G. Meade. By 1853, Wise had moved to his third wife's estate near Norfolk. Governor Wise may be most famous for signing John Brown's death warrant, or for his secession oratory. Despite his lack of military training, Wise became a Confederate General (removed from his duties in the west in 1862 and reassigned to protect the southern Chesapeake Bay region, but who lost the Battle of Roanoke Island). Confederate General Wise continued to serve in North Carolina and Virginia until war's end, when he urged General Robert E. Lee to surrender at Appomattox Courthouse. After the war, Wise resumed his legal practice in Richmond.

While many other churches on the Eastern Shore of Virginia were severely damaged by occupying Union Army during the American Civil War, including nearby St. George's Church, St. James Church was spared. Union General Henry H. Lockwood listened to the urging of Accomac's citizens and kept his troops well-disciplined. Lockwood also took over a house abandoned by Dr. Peter Browne, which he made Union headquarters for construction of a telegraph line to Hampton Roads, and later became the rectory for this church's ministers.

== Architecture ==
St. James Church is designed in Greek Revival style. The brick walls are laid in 3-to-1 common bond both above and below the water table which is concealed by stucco on the front (southwest) facade which is scored to simulate ashlar stone. The front facade is dominated by a tetrastyle portico of Doric order which has a brick floor laid in heringbone. Two doorways, each with double six-panel raised doors, provide access to the interior and a lunette window is centered above which provides light to the gallery stair inside. A wooden cornice with dentil trim extends across the front facade of the portico and along each side of the church. Centered over the front gable is a wooden belfry and spire, which featured paired columns at each corner framing a lancet-shaped louvered opening. These gothic arches are the only element of the building that contrast from the Greek Revival style.

Inside, St. James Church is dominated by Potts' trompe-l'oeil frescoes, which cover all four walls beginning at the dado and rising to and covering the barrel vaulted ceiling. The walls are painted to simulate recessed panels which rise to a painted cornice. Potts then painted a row of coffers around the four sides of the ceiling which frame a large panel that is decorated with simulated plaster scrollwork. In the center of the ceiling is a painted medallion with a profusion of scrollwork. Apart from the ceiling, Potts lavished much detail on the wall behind the chancel, where four fluted pilasters rise to support an entablature and cornice, creating a visual opening to a barrel vaulted apse with coffered ceiling, all painted onto the flat wall. The frescoes conceal a door which opens into the vestry that is centered on the rear wall of the church. In the 20th century, Linda Croison and Philip Ward restored the frescoes, but preserved patches of Potts' original work in the back of the nave.

The interior furnishings are mostly of simple design. Slip pews with doors, each labeled with roman numerals, span the nave in four sections and extend along each side to frame the chancel. A balustrade with turned balusters spans the three sides of the chancel, opening with two gates at the back wall on each side. The gallery extending across the rear of the nave is accessed by a central staircase. Two flights rise along the back wall from each door to a shared landing, where a flying stair continues up to the gallery floor.

== Modern times ==
St. James is an active congregation in the Episcopal Diocese of Southern Virginia. It is part of St. George's Parish in Pungoteague. The present rector is the Rev. Philip Bjornberg.

== Gallery ==
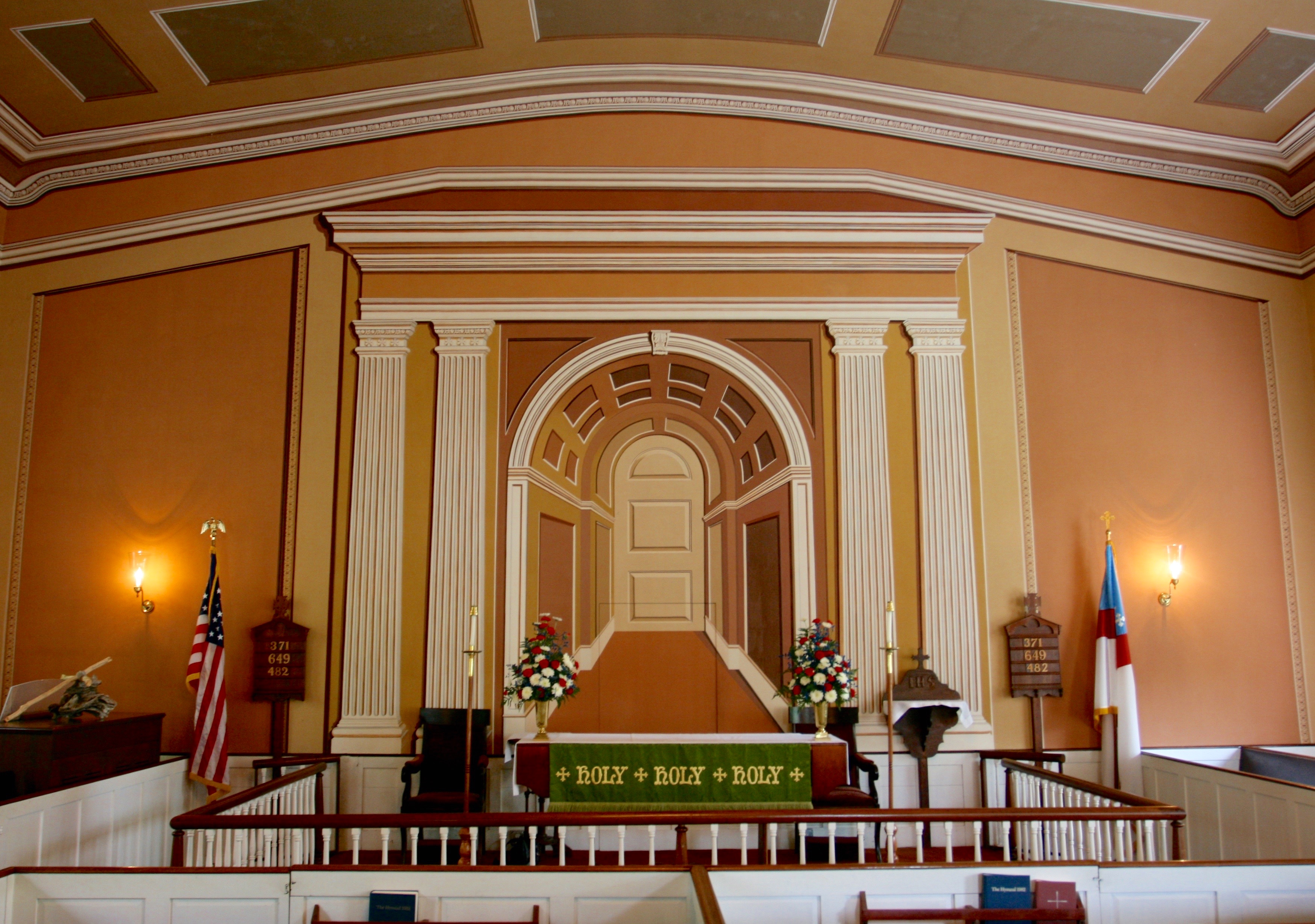

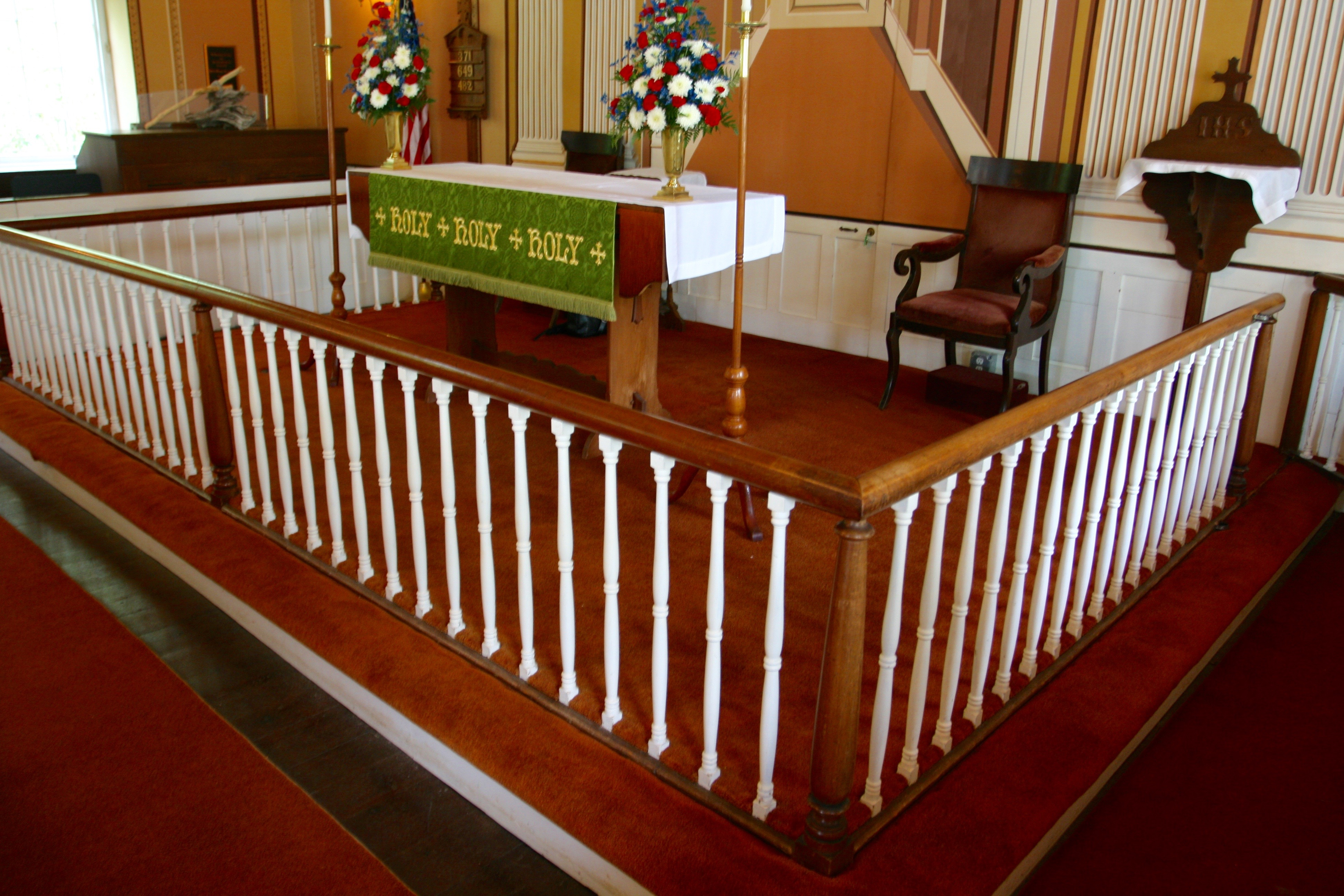

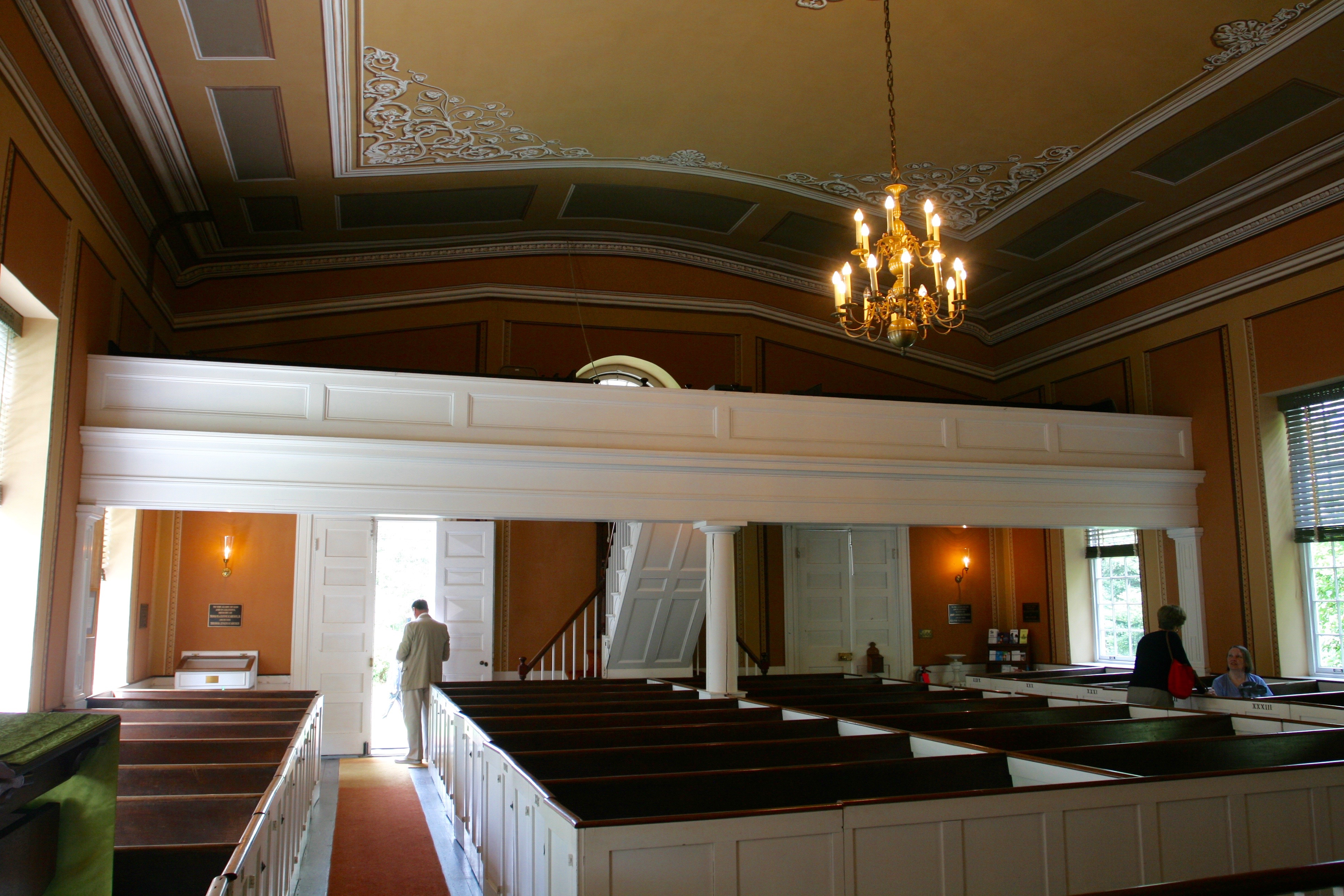

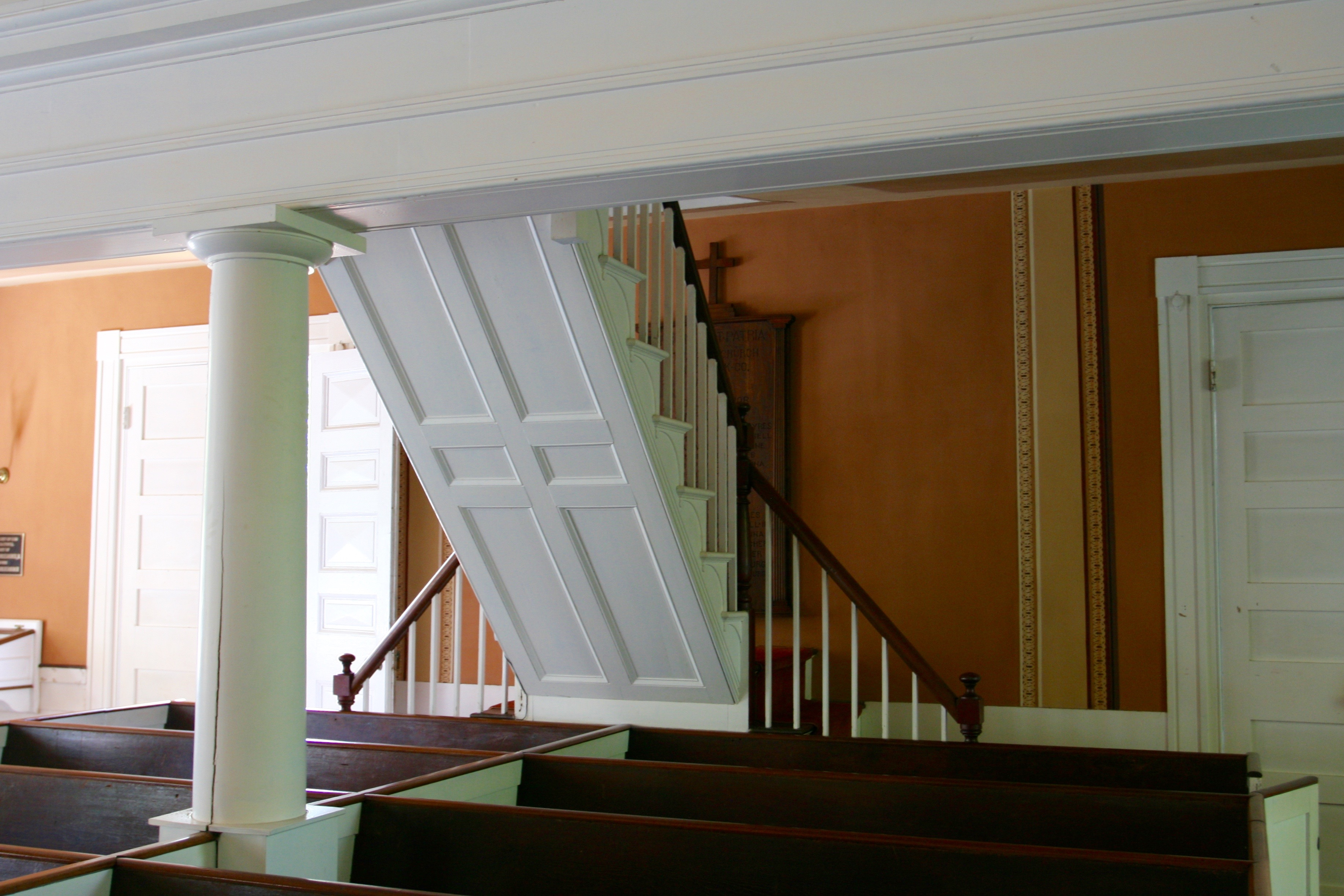

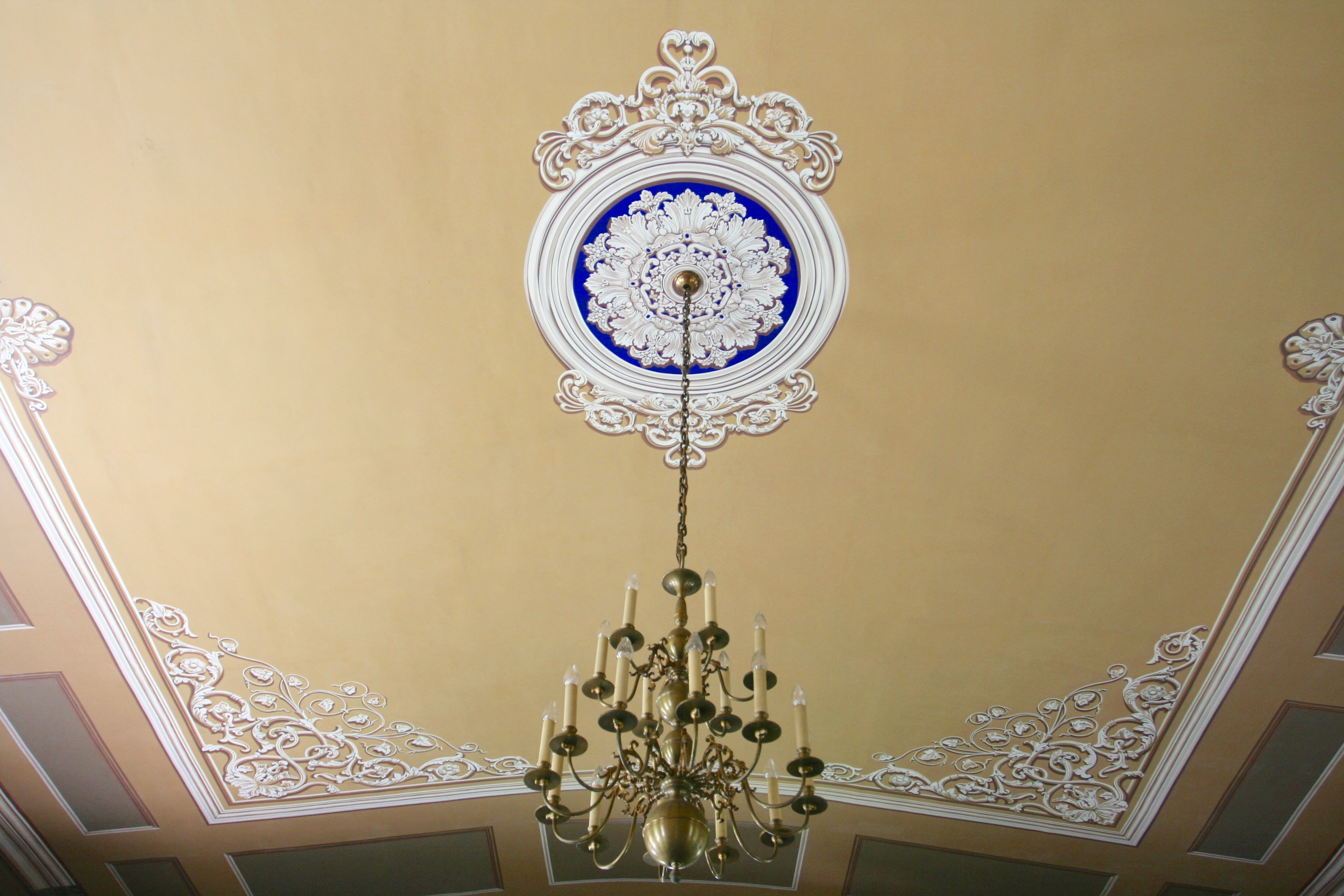

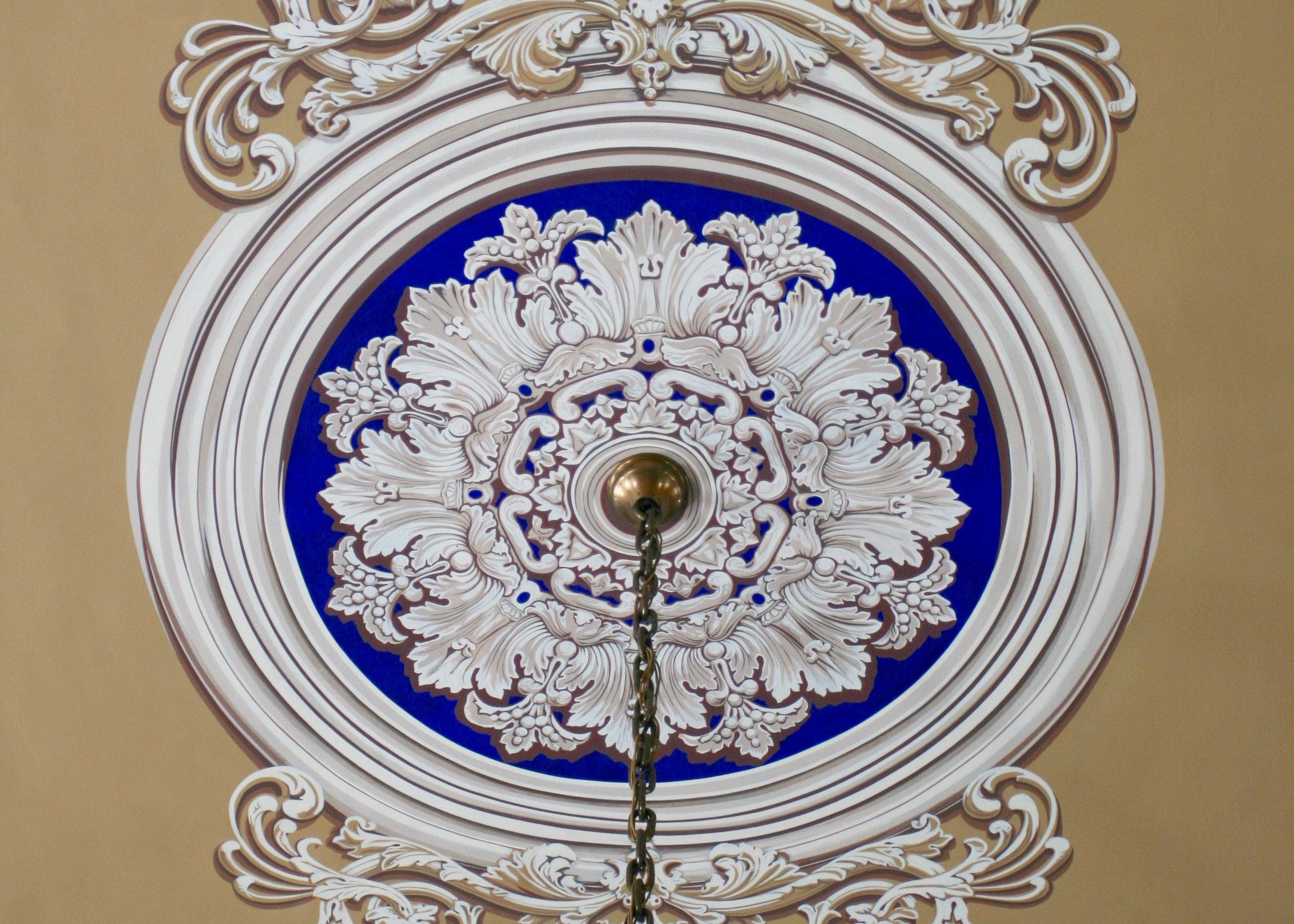

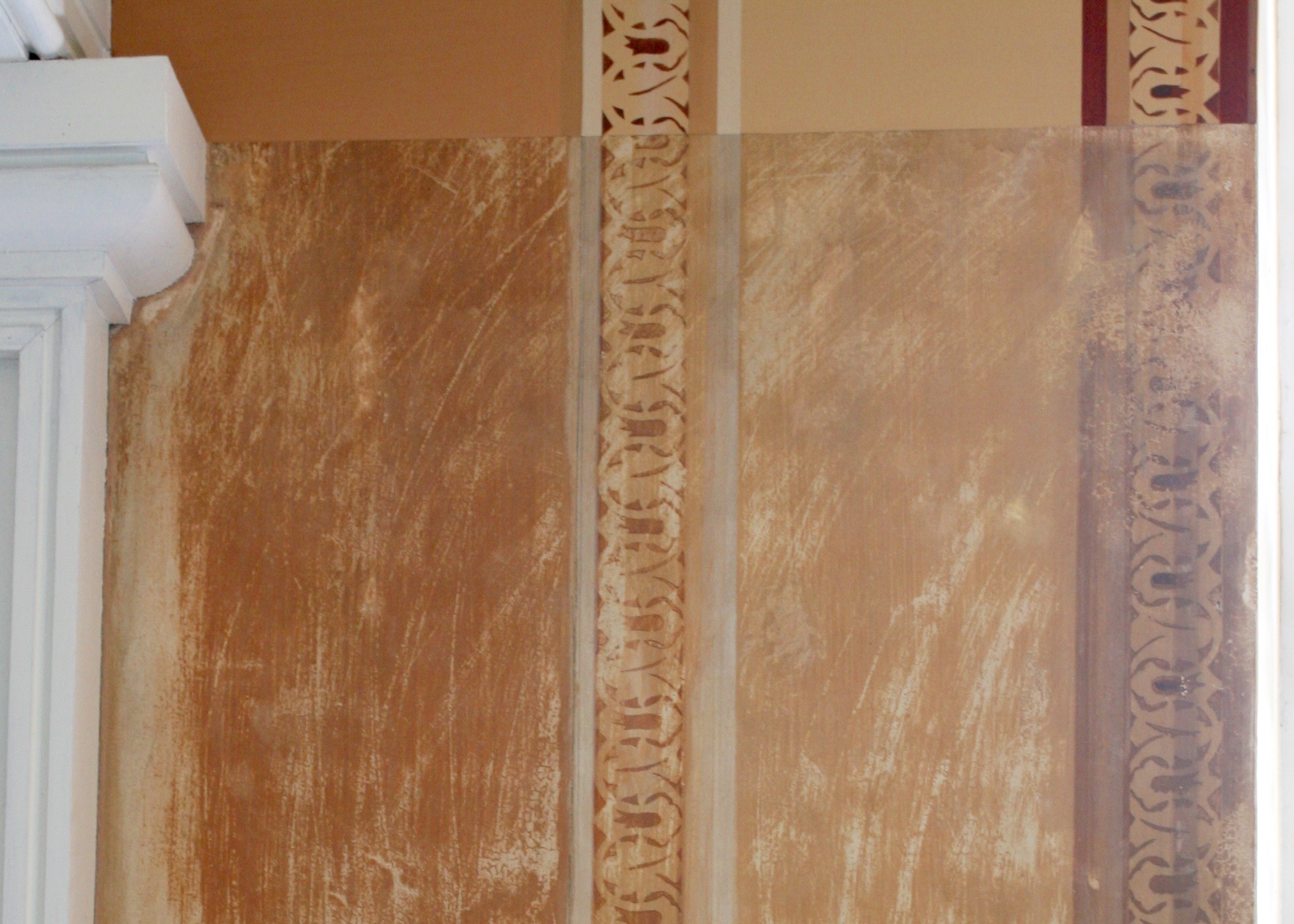
