= Cokesbury Church =

Historic church in Virginia, United States

- U.S. National Register of Historic Places
- U.S. Historic district – Contributing property
- Virginia Landmarks Register
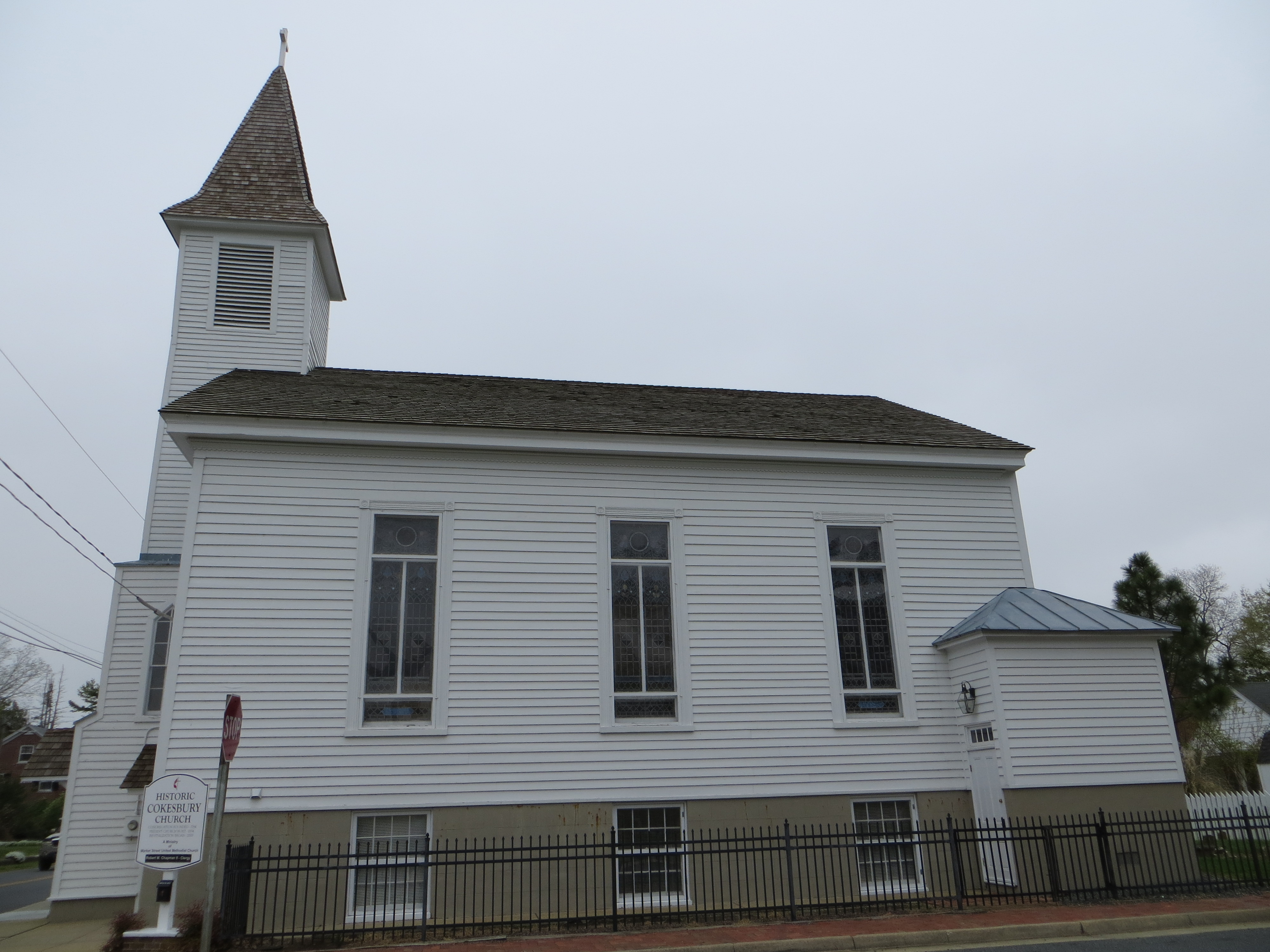
- Cokesbury Methodist Church, April 2013

- Location within Virginia Location within the United States
- Location: 13 Market St., Onancock, Virginia
- Coordinates: 37°42′50″N 75°45′9″W
- Area: 0.1 acres (0.040 ha)
- Built: 1854, 1886, 1892-1894
- Architectural style: Greek Revival, Gothic
- NRHP reference No.: 04001265
- VLR No.: 273-0001-0171

Significant dates
- Added to NRHP: November 27, 2004
- Designated VLR: September 8, 2004

Cokesbury United Methodist Church is a historic Methodist church located at 13 Market Street in Onancock, Accomack County, Virginia. It was built in 1854, as a one-story, Greek Revival-style temple-front frame church. It was enlarged with a four-story, Gothic Revival entrance / bell tower with spire in 1886 and remodeled in 1892–1894. Surrounding the church on two sides is the church cemetery containing a selection of marble tombstones.

It was added to the National Register of Historic Places in 2004. It is located in the Onancock Historic District.
