= Guilford, Virginia =

Unincorporated community in Virginia, United States

Coordinates: 37°49′29.4″N 75°39′5.7″W

Guilford is an unincorporated community in Accomack County, Virginia, United States.

Mason House was added to the National Register of Historic Places in 1974.
