= New Church, Virginia =

- Census-designated place
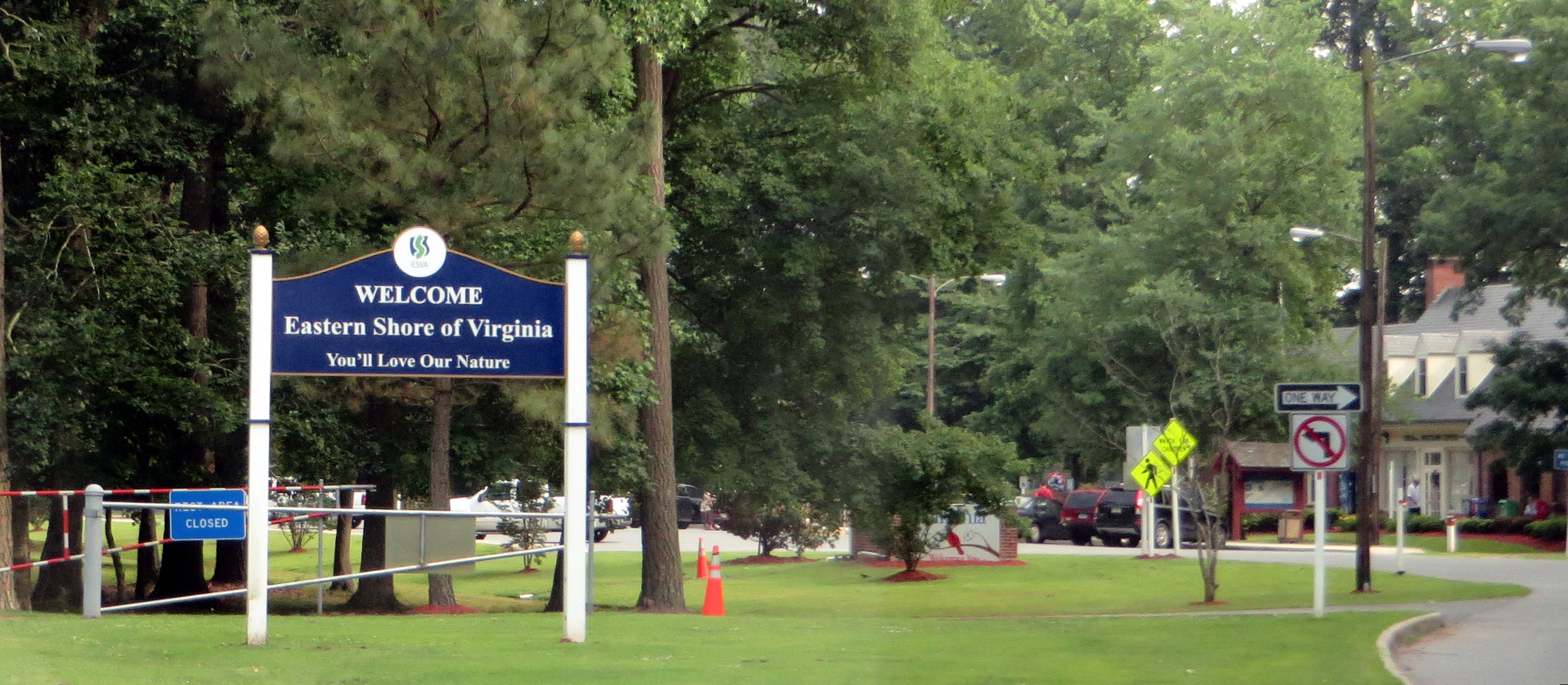
- Sign in New Church

- Location in Accomack County and the state of Virginia.
- Coordinates: 37°58′57″N 75°31′45″W
- Country: United States
- State: Virginia
- County: Accomack
- Elevation: 23 ft (7.0 m)

Population (2020)
  - Total: 256
- Time zone: UTC−5 (Eastern (EST))
  - Summer (DST): UTC−4 (EDT)
- FIPS code: 51-48776
- GNIS feature ID: 2584891

New Church is a census-designated place (CDP) in Accomack County, Virginia, United States. Per the 2020 census, the population was 256.

Pitts Neck Farm was added to the National Register of Historic Places in 1976.

== Geography ==
The CDP lies at an elevation of 23 feet.

== Demographics ==
Historical population
Census	Pop.	Note	%±
2010	205		—
2020	256		24.9%
U.S. Decennial Census; 2010 2020

New Church was first listed as a census designated place in the 2010 U.S. census.

=== 2020 census ===
New Church CDP, Virginia – Racial and ethnic composition Note: the US Census treats Hispanic/Latino as an ethnic category. This table excludes Latinos from the racial categories and assigns them to a separate category. Hispanics/Latinos may be of any race.
Race / Ethnicity (NH = Non-Hispanic)	Pop 2010	Pop 2020	% 2010	% 2020
White alone (NH)	159	159	77.56%	62.11%
Black or African American alone (NH)	34	63	16.59%	24.61%
Native American or Alaska Native alone (NH)	1	2	0.49%	0.78%
Asian alone (NH)	2	10	0.98%	3.91%
Pacific Islander alone (NH)	0	0	0.00%	0.00%
Some Other Race alone (NH)	0	0	0.00%	0.00%
Mixed Race or Multi-Racial (NH)	1	17	0.49%	6.64%
Hispanic or Latino (any race)	8	5	3.90%	1.95%
Total	205	256	100.00%	100.00%
