= Assawoman, Virginia =

Unincorporated community in Virginia, United States

- Unincorporated community
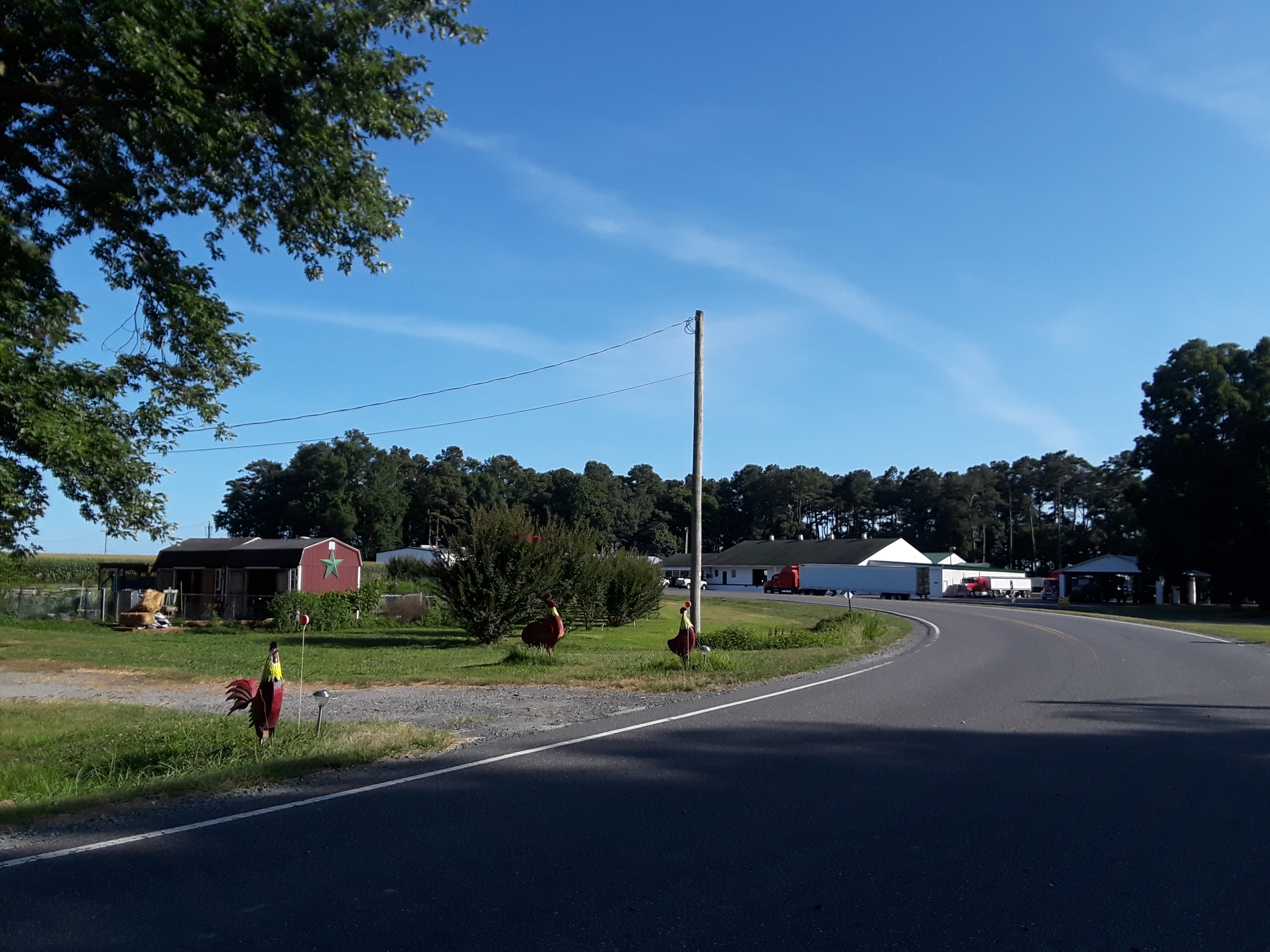
- Assawoman in July 2018

- Location in Virginia Assawoman (the United States)
- Coordinates: 37°52′27″N 75°31′28″W
- Country: United States
- State: Virginia
- County: Accomack
- Time zone: UTC−5 (Eastern (EST))
  - Summer (DST): UTC−4 (EDT)
- ZIP codes: 23302
- GNIS feature ID: 1462604

Assawoman is an unincorporated community in Accomack County, Virginia, United States. Its ZIP code is 23302.

== Etymology ==
The name "Assawoman" denoted a female Indian of the similarly-named tribe. Assawoman was originally known as Assawaman until 1966 when the Board on Geographic Names decided upon its current spelling.

== History ==
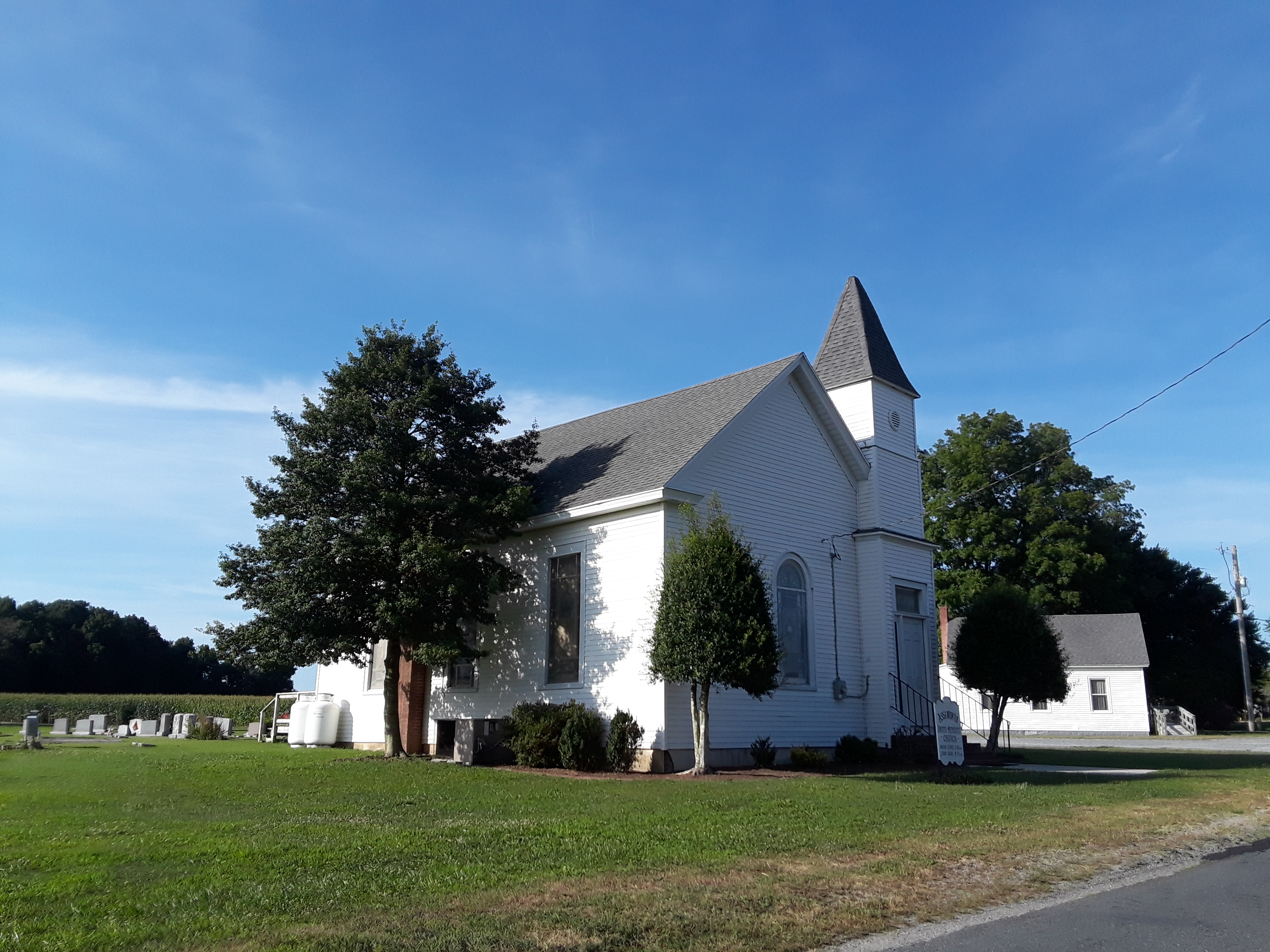
Assawoman United Methodist Church in July 2018

Arbuckle Place, situated in Assawoman, was added to the National Register of Historic Places in 1986. Their post office was established in October 1890.

== See also ==
- Assawoman Bay
