= Mason House (Guilford, Virginia) =

- U.S. National Register of Historic Places
- Virginia Landmarks Register
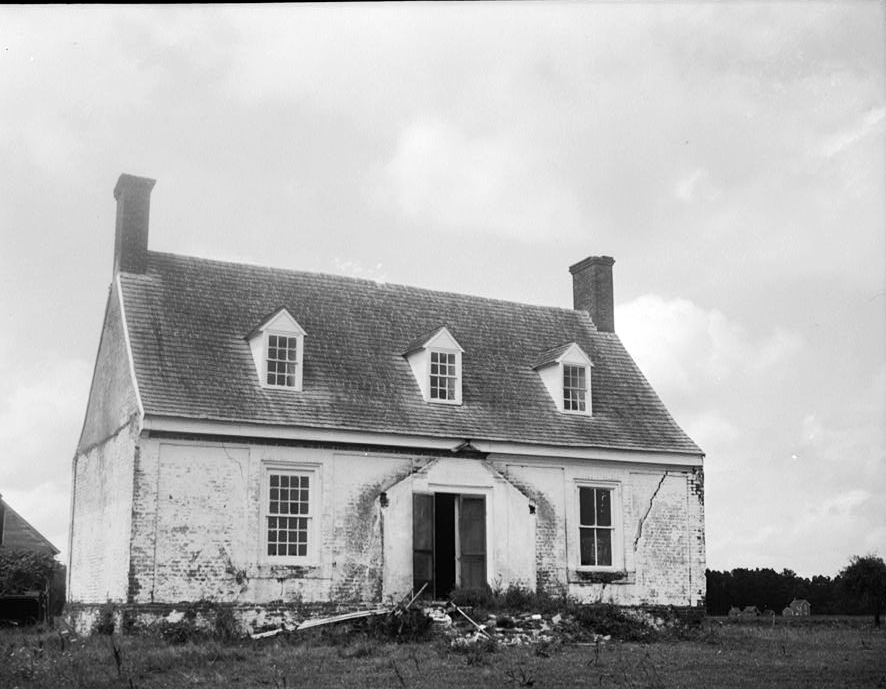
- Mason House in 1960

- Location within Virginia Location within the United States
- Location: VA 615, Guilford, Virginia
- Coordinates: 37°50′1″N 75°39′14″W
- Area: less than one acre
- Built: c. 1722
- Built by: Andrews, William
- Architectural style: Colonial, Jacobean-Georgian
- NRHP reference No.: 74002100
- VLR No.: 001-0029

Significant dates
- Added to NRHP: November 21, 1974
- Designated VLR: September 17, 1974

Mason House, also known as the Hinman-Mason House, is an historic dwelling located at Guilford in Accomack County, Virginia. Trees were cut for its construction in the winter of 1729/30 and construction likely started soon thereafter.

The house is an early example of one laid out with a center passage.

It was added to the National Register of Historic Places in 1974.
