= Bank Building (Accomac, Virginia) =

Historic building in Virginia, US

- U.S. National Register of Historic Places
- Virginia Landmarks Register
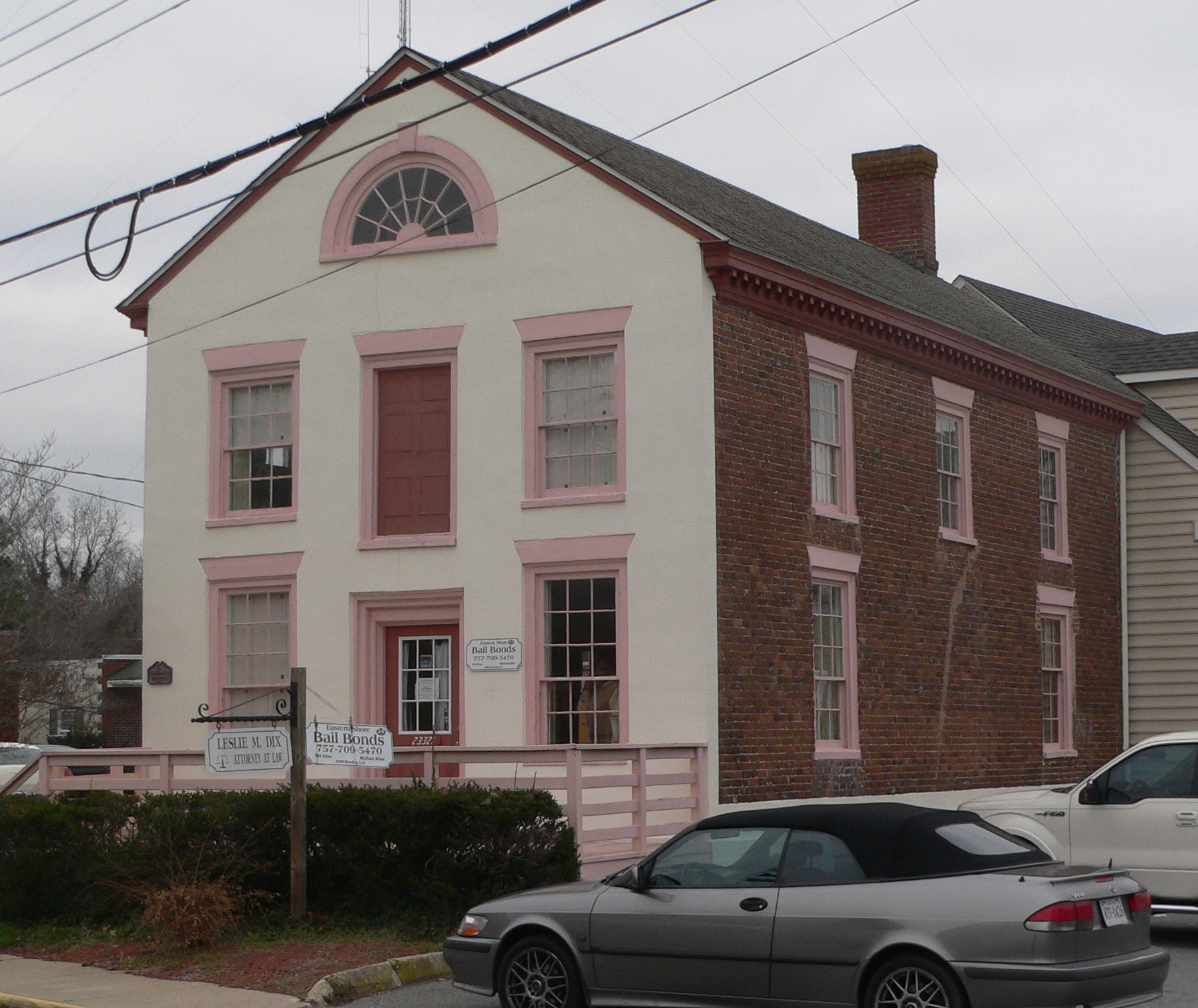

- Location within Virginia Location within the United States
- Location: 23321 Courthouse Avenue, Accomac, Virginia
- Coordinates: 37.719616°N 75.670713°W
- Area: less than one acre
- Built: c. 1820
- Built by: Higgins, Michael; McCollom, Alexander
- Architectural style: Federal
- NRHP reference No.: 74002099
- VLR No.: 160-0013

Significant dates
- Added to NRHP: July 23, 1974
- Designated VLR: May 21, 1974

Bank Building, also known as Old Mercantile Building and Eastern Shore Chamber of Commerce, is a historical commercial building located in Accomac in Accomack County, Virginia, United States. It was built about 1820, and it is a two-story, rectangular brick structure in the Federal style. The front facade and watertable are stuccoed. It has a gable roof and features a fanlight window above the second story door.

It was added to the National Register of Historic Places in 1974.
