= Virginia State Route 178 =

State highway in Virginia, United States

State Route 178

Route information
- Maintained by VDOT
- Length: 11.51 mi (18.52 km)
- Existed: 1933–present

Major junctions
- South end: US 13 Bus. in Exmore
- US 13 in Exmore; SR 181 in Belle Haven; SR 180 in Pungoteague
- North end: SR 620 / SR 628 / SR 718 at Bobtown

Location
- Country: United States
- State: Virginia
- Counties: Northampton, Accomack

Highway system
- Virginia Routes; Interstate; US; Primary; Secondary; Byways; History; HOT lanes
← SR 177	→ SR 179

State Route 178 (SR 178) is a primary state highway in the U.S. state of Virginia. The state highway runs 11.51 miles (18.52 km) from U.S. Route 13 Business (US 13 Business) in Exmore north to SR 620, SR 628, and SR 718 at Bobtown. SR 178 connects Exmore in far northern Northampton County with Belle Haven and Pungoteague in southern Accomack County.

== Route description ==
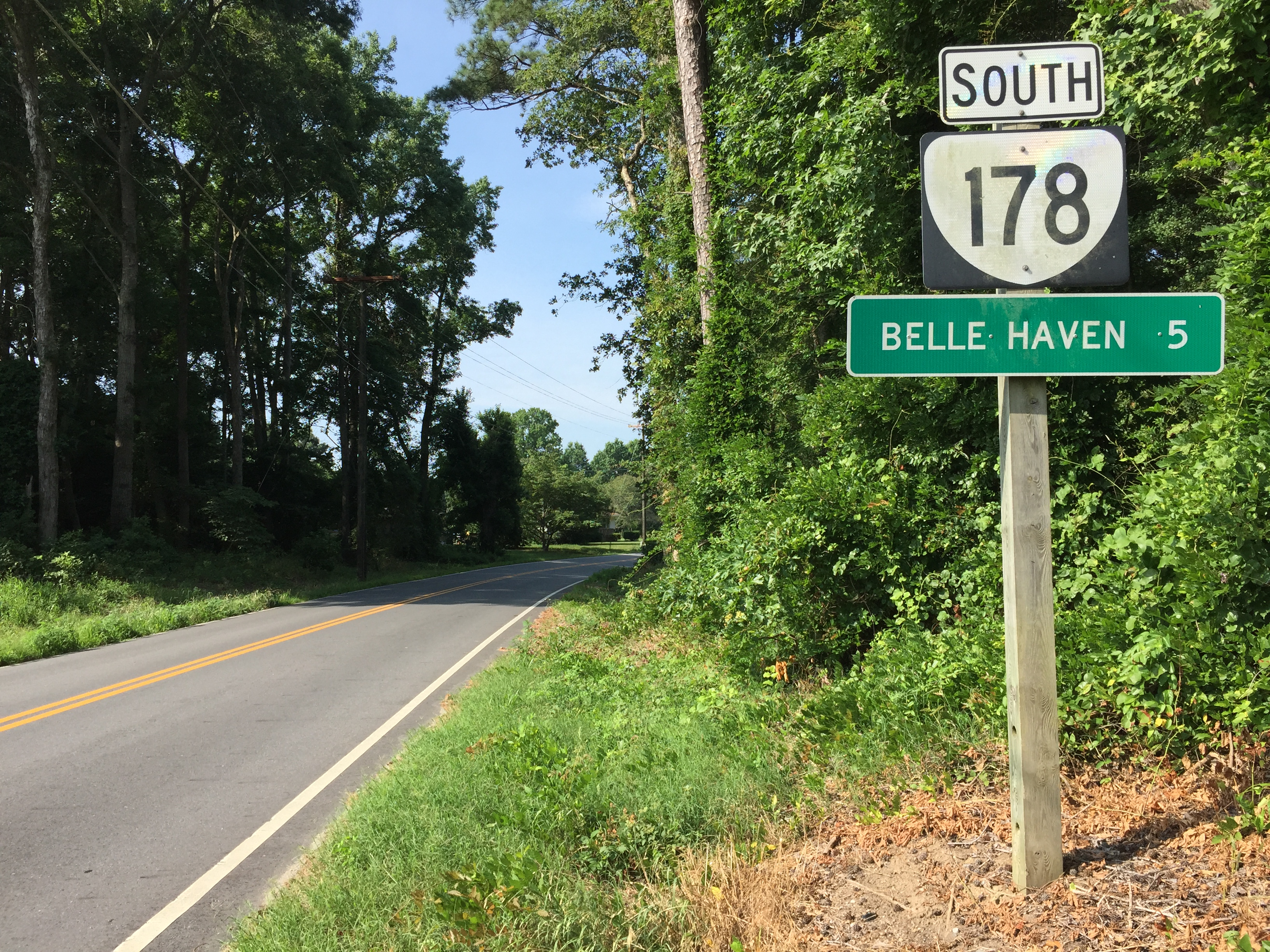
View south along SR 178 in Boston

SR 178 begins at an intersection with US 13 Business in the town of Exmore. The business route heads south as Main Street northeast as Lincoln Avenue. SR 178 follows two-lane undivided Main Street to US 13 (Lankford Highway), at which point the highway becomes Belle Haven Road. North of the boundary between the towns of Exmore and Belle Haven, the state highway crosses the Northampton–Accomack county line. In the center of Belle Haven, the state highway meets the western end of SR 181 (King Street); SR 178 turns west onto Shields Bridge Road, which crosses Occohannock Creek on the namesake bridge. The state highway veers north through the hamlets of Shields and Craddockville, where the highway continues northeast on Boston Road through Boston and Pennyville. SR 178's name becomes Bobtown Road at the south end of Pungoteague. Within that village, the state highway passes St. George's Church has a very short concurrency with SR 180, which heads northwest as Harborton Road and southeast as Pungoteague Road. SR 178 reaches its northern terminus at Bobtown at its intersection with SR 620 (Hollies Church Road) and SR 628 (Country Club Road). Bobtown Road continues north toward Onancock as SR 718.

== Major intersections ==
County	Location	mi	km	Destinations	Notes
Northampton	Exmore	0.00	0.00	US 13 Bus. (Main Street/Lincoln Avenue)	Southern terminus
Northampton	Exmore	0.36	0.58	US 13 (Lankford Highway) – Nassawadox, Painter	
Accomack	Belle Haven	1.34	2.16	SR 181 (King Street / Belle Haven Road)	
Accomack	Pungoteague	9.58	15.42	SR 180 west (Harborton Road) – Harborton	South end of concurrency with SR 180
Accomack	Pungoteague	9.61	15.47	SR 180 east (Pungoteague Road) – Keller	North end of concurrency with SR 180
Accomack	Bobtown	11.51	18.52	SR 620 east (Hollies Church Road) / SR 628 west (Country Club Road) / SR 718 north (Bobtown Road) – Onancock	Northern terminus
1.000 mi = 1.609 km; 1.000 km = 0.621 mi: Concurrency terminus

< SR 521	District 5 State Routes; 1928–1933	SR 523 >
< SR 525	District 5 State Routes; 1928–1933	SR 527 >
