= Wachapreague =

Wachapreague may refer to:

People

- The Wachapreague people, an Algonquian people that lived in coastal Virginia centuries ago.

Places

- Wachapreague, Virginia, a town in Accomack County, Virginia
- Wachapreague Channel, an inlet on the eastern shore of Virginia

Ships

- USS Wachapreague (AVP-56), a United States Navy seaplane tender laid down in 1943 but converted during construction into the motor torpedo tender USS Wachapreague (AGP-8)
- USS Wachapreague (AGP-8), a United States Navy motor torpedo boat tender in commission from 1944 to 1946
