= Virginia State Route 180 =

State highway in Accomack County, Virginia, US

State Route 180

Route information
- Maintained by VDOT
- Length: 11.25 mi (18.11 km)
- Existed: 1933–present
- Tourist routes: Virginia Byway

Major junctions
- West end: Dead end in Harborton
- SR 178 in Pungoteague; US 13 in Keller
- East end: SR 1701 in Wachapreague

Location
- Country: United States
- State: Virginia
- Counties: Accomack

Highway system
- Virginia Routes; Interstate; US; Primary; Secondary; Byways; History; HOT lanes
← SR 179	→ SR 181

State Route 180 (SR 180) is a primary state highway in the U.S. state of Virginia. The state highway runs 11.25 miles (18.11 km) from a dead end in Harborton east to SR 1701 in Wachapreague. SR 180 is a cross-peninsula highway in southern Accomack County that passes through Pungoteague and Keller, the latter location where the highway meets U.S. Route 13 (US 13).

== Route description ==
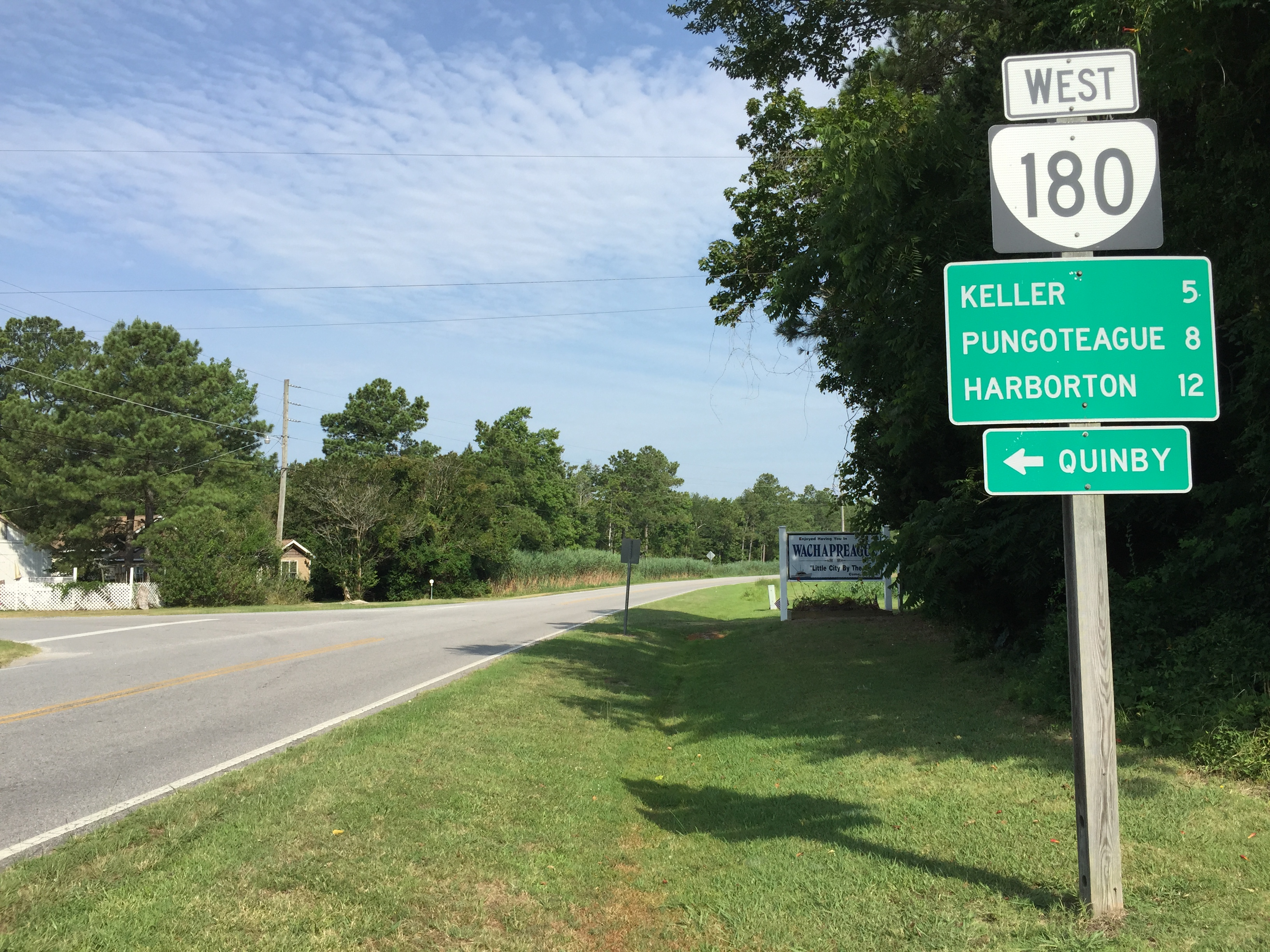
View west along SR 180 at SR 605 in Wachapreague

SR 180 begins at a boat ramp on Pungoteague Creek, which flows into the Chesapeake Bay. The state highway follows the shoreline as two-lane undivided Shore Drive, then turns south onto Harborton Road, the main street of the village of Harborton. SR 180 veers southeast to the village of Pungoteague, within which the highway has a very short concurrency with SR 178 (Bobtown Road). The state highway continues southeast and then east as Pungoteague Road to the town of Keller. SR 180 follows 1st Street to US 13 (Lankford Highway), then heads north along the U.S. Highway to the northern town limit of Keller. The state highway has a grade crossing of an inactive railroad line immediately to the east of US 13, then heads east as Wachapreague Road. SR 180 follows Main Street through the town of Wachapreague to its eastern terminus at SR 1701 (Atlantic Avenue) on the waterfront of a channel within the wetlands on the Atlantic Ocean side of the peninsula. Within Wachapreague, SR 180 has a wye route, SR 180Y, that runs 0.55 miles (0.89 km) from SR 180 along Brooklyn Street and Richardson Avenue to its terminus at the intersection of Richardson Avenue and Church Street.

== Major intersections ==
The entire route is in Accomack County.

Location	mi	km	Destinations	Notes
Harborton	0.00	0.00	Dead end at Pungoteague Creek	Western terminus
Pungoteague	3.06	4.92	SR 178 north (Bobtown Road) – Onancock	West end of concurrency with SR 178
Pungoteague	3.09	4.97	SR 178 south (Bobtown Road) – Belle Haven	East end of concurrency with SR 178
Keller	6.44	10.36	US 13 south (Lankford Highway) / SR 696 east (North Street) – Eastville	West end of concurrency with US 13
Keller	6.90	11.10	US 13 north (Lankford Highway) / SR 623 west (Adams Crossing) – Accomac	East end of concurrency with US 13
Wachapreague	11.25	18.11	SR 1701 (Atlantic Avenue)	Eastern terminus
1.000 mi = 1.609 km; 1.000 km = 0.621 mi: Concurrency terminus

< SR 522	District 5 State Routes; 1928–1933	SR 524 >
