= Susie May Ames =

American historian, educator and author

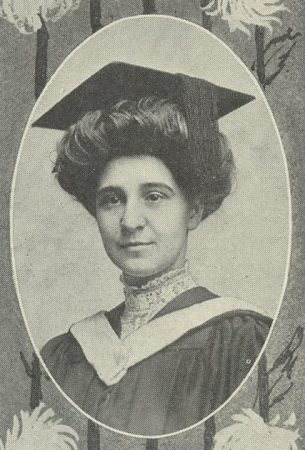
- Born: January 10, 1888; Pungoteague, Virginia, U.S.
- Died: July 30, 1969 (aged 81); Onancock, Virginia, U.S.
- Education: Randolph Macon Women's College; Columbia University
- Occupations: Historian; educator; author
- Parent(s): Samuel William Ames; Sarah Anne Edmonds Mears Ames

Susie May Ames (January 10, 1888 – July 30, 1969) was a twentieth century American historian, educator, and author. She conducted research on the Eastern Shore of Virginia in the colonial period.

== Early life and education ==
Susie May Ames was born in Pungoteague, Accomack County, Virginia, on January 10, 1888. She was the second child of Samuel William Ames, a businessman, and Sarah Anne Edmonds Mears Ames. Her early education took place in local schools. She matriculated at Randolph Macon Women's College (now Randolph College) and graduated in 1908. While there, she majored in English and minored in Latin.

== Career ==
=== Early teaching ===
After she graduated from Randolph-Macon, Ames taught in public schools. She began teaching at Crewe High School in Nottoway County, in south central Virginia, then was principal of Harborton High School in Accomack County from 1909 to 1911. From 1911 and 1916, Ames taught at high schools in Indiana, Maryland, and at the Eastern Kentucky Normal School (now Eastern Kentucky University). She returned to the Eastern Shore in 1916, and taught at Franktown-Nassawadox High School, became principal of Pungoteague High School in 1917, and served on the faculty of E.C. Glass High School in Lynchburg, Virginia, from 1920 to 1923.

=== Graduate education ===
Teaching at the high school level was highest level commonly open to women in the early twentieth century. Ames, however, had ambitions to teach at higher levels, and began graduate coursework in English in summer 1915 at the University of Chicago. She also took history courses through the University of California in 1923. In the fall of 1923, Ames was appointed as an instructor in history at Randolph-Macon Women's College, where she taught for the rest of her career.

After joining the faculty, she continued graduate studies, received a master's degree in 1926 at Columbia University. She studied with Evarts Boutell Greene, the first De Witt Clinton Professor of History at Columbia University/ Ames published her first major article in the Journal of Economic and Business History in 1931. She was also interested in the Civil War on the Eastern Shore, and conducted interviews of local residents to collect memories of the war. A scholarship in 1927 allowed her to travel in Europe.

Ames earned her PhD in 1940. Her dissertation, "Studies of the Virginia Eastern Shore in the Seventeenth Century", was a landmark social and economic history based on analysis of the earliest county court records in the United States.

=== Research and teaching ===
Ames' work in the early 1940s reflected the anxieties of World War II. She worked on an investigation of Edmund Scarburgh, one of Accomack County's early chief magistrates, who was known for his aggression. Scarburgh's aggressive behaviors led to Jamestown authorities merging Northampton and Accomack Counties in 1670 and then to separate them two and a half years later after Scarburgh's death. Ames wrote about this issue in "The Reunion of Two Virginia Counties" in the Journal of Southern History. In the 1950s, issues of civil rights inspired her to examine federal policy towards the Eastern Shore in the Civil War. In 1944, she was appointed to the Virginia World War II History Commission, to help the state document the conflict.

Her best-known work was her edited volume County Court Records of Accomack-Northampton, Virginia, 1632-1640. ---m published in 1954 by the American Historical Association as volumen 7 of the American Legal records series. She continued to work on the Eastern Shore, and was most interested in "Law-in-Action," rather than in colonial adoption of English law. Her work on the Eastern Shore was credited as foundational by later historians T.H. Breen and Stephen Innes.

Ames was a member of numerous professional associations, contributed and reviewed for many journals. Unfortunately, like many other female academics in the South, she was often barred from the meetings of these associations. Consequently, many of her ideas were first presented to women's clubs and in other, less formal spaces. She with her colleagues at Columbia, but had little contact with other historians at colleges and universities in Virginia, which were generally less open to female scholars than northern universities.

== Later life ==
Throughout her teaching career, Ames had been caring for her aging mother. Like many female scholars of that era, Ames never married. She took a leave of absence after twenty-five years of teaching in 1948-1949 because of her mother's ill health, and when she retired in 1955, moved back to Pungoteague to care for her now elderly mother.

Ames continued her scholarly work after her retirement, editing a second volume of Eastern Shore records covering 1640–1645, which was published by the Virginia Historical Society in 1973. Earl Gregg Swem commissioned Ames to write Reading, Writing and Arithmetic in Virginia, 1607-1699 in 1957. Ames also published "The Bear and the Cub": The Site of the First English Theatrical Performance in America in 1965.

Ames was also active in her community, as She was the founder and president of the Eastern Shore of Virginia Historical Society, as well as other patriotic societies, women's and garden clubs, and the Pungoteague Methodist Church.

Susie M. Ames died on July 20, 1969, at the Hermitage in Onancock, Accomack County. She was buried in the cemetery of Saint George's Episcopal Church near Pungoteague.

== Selected works ==
- County Court Records of Accomack-Northampton, Virginia, 1632-1640. ---m, 1954
- Reading, Writing and Arithmetic in Virginia, 1607-1699, 1957
- "The Bear and the Cub": The Site of the First English Theatrical Performance in America, 1965
