= St. George's Church (Pungoteague, Virginia) =

Historic church in Virginia, US

- U.S. National Register of Historic Places
- Virginia Landmarks Register
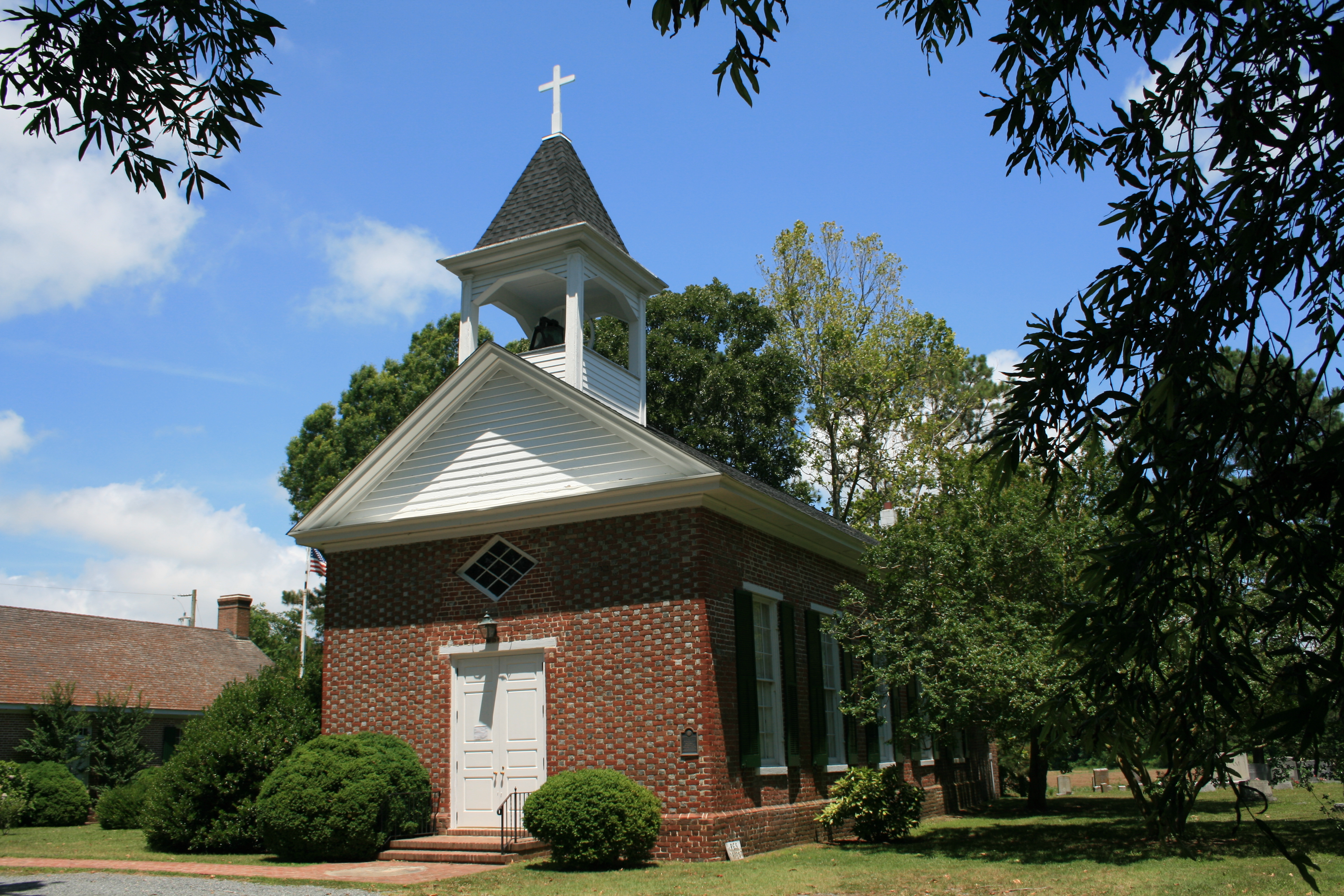
- St. George's Church in 2008

- Location within Virginia Location within the United States
- Location: VA 178, NE of jct. with VA 180, Pungoteague, Virginia
- Coordinates: 37°38′2″N 75°48′40″W
- Area: 9.9 acres (4.0 ha)
- Built: 1738, 1880
- Architectural style: Georgian
- NRHP reference No.: 70000781
- VLR No.: 001-0040

Significant dates
- Added to NRHP: September 15, 1970
- Designated VLR: June 2, 1970

St. George's Church is a historic Episcopal Church on VA 178, northeast of the junction with VA 180 in Pungoteague, Accomack County, Virginia. Established in the seventeenth century, the building, erected in 1738, is the oldest house of worship standing on Virginia's Eastern Shore. The church was added to the National Register of Historic Places in 1970.

== History ==
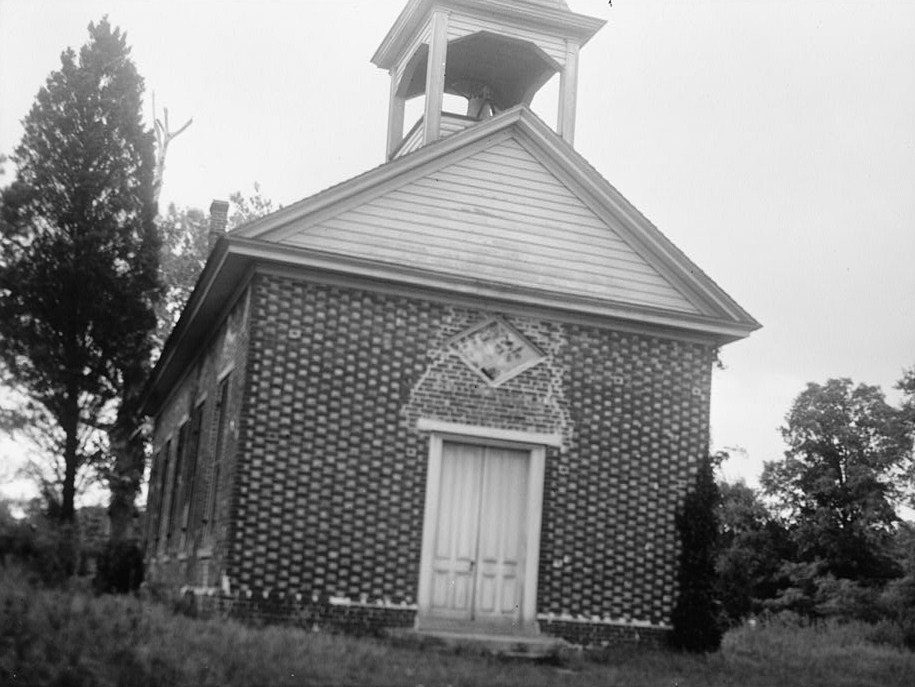
HABS photograph

The Anglican (Episcopal) faith was brought to Virginia's Eastern Shore by English settlers migrating across the Chesapeake Bay from the Jamestown Settlement beginning in the 1620s. King Debedeavon had welcomed English traders and even settlers, and the English established a courthouse and Hungars Parish Church (1643) further down the coast in what became Eastville, Virginia. Chapels of ease (some of which later became parish churches when population warranted) were established near other settlements by the end of the seventeenth century. One near a Native American village that later became Pungoteague, became the predecessor to the present St. George's Church. Accomack Parish was created in 1663, and its first minister was Henry Parke. However, The first church to occupy the site, likely constructed of logs or frame, was standing by 1678 but in severe disrepair by 1736.

Construction of the now historic church began by 1738 and it reached its present form in 1761, among the most elaborate in the Colony of Virginia. However, the Church of England (which reorganized after the Revolution as the Episcopal Church) was disestablished in Virginia early in the 19th century. Priests no longer could count on government support of their salaries, and soon the farms (glebes) which provided part of their salaries were privatized. Many fell into ruin, but some were repaired mid-century as the local economy improved. St. George's Church still preserves a silver communion service inscribed "This belongs to the Parish of Accomack" dated 1734–5.

During the American Civil War, the Union Army occupied the Eastern Shore (Delmarva Peninsula) from Hampton Roads northwards. Union troops protecting a strategic telegraph line camped nearby, and housed their horses in the church's box pews, which were heavily damaged. By the end of the Civil War, St. George's Church stood in ruin, one of its four wings completely dismantled and all interior furnishing destroyed. Episcopalians reclaimed the church in 1880 and partially restored it by using the remnants of the original walls to patch the transept which still stands today.

== Architecture ==
Designed in Georgian style, St. George's Church was originally cruciform in shape with a communion table oriented to the east, box pews, an elevated pulpit, and a semi-circular apse (common in Georgian Churches in Maryland, but not in Virginia). The entire building was topped with a hipped, gambrel roof, also a unique feature among Virginia's Georgian churches. Though only a fragment remains today, the church's brickwork was especially well-executed using flemish bond accented by glazed headers. The only known image of the structure's original design is a sketch made by Reverend James Wallace Eastburn in 1819.

== Modern times ==
The church is still active in the Episcopal Diocese of Southern Virginia.
