= Belle Haven, Virginia =

Belle Haven is the name of some places in the U.S. state of Virginia:

- Belle Haven, Accomack County, Virginia
- Belle Haven, Fairfax County, Virginia
