= Pungoteague Creek =

Coordinates: 37°40′34.47″N 75°51′45.76″W

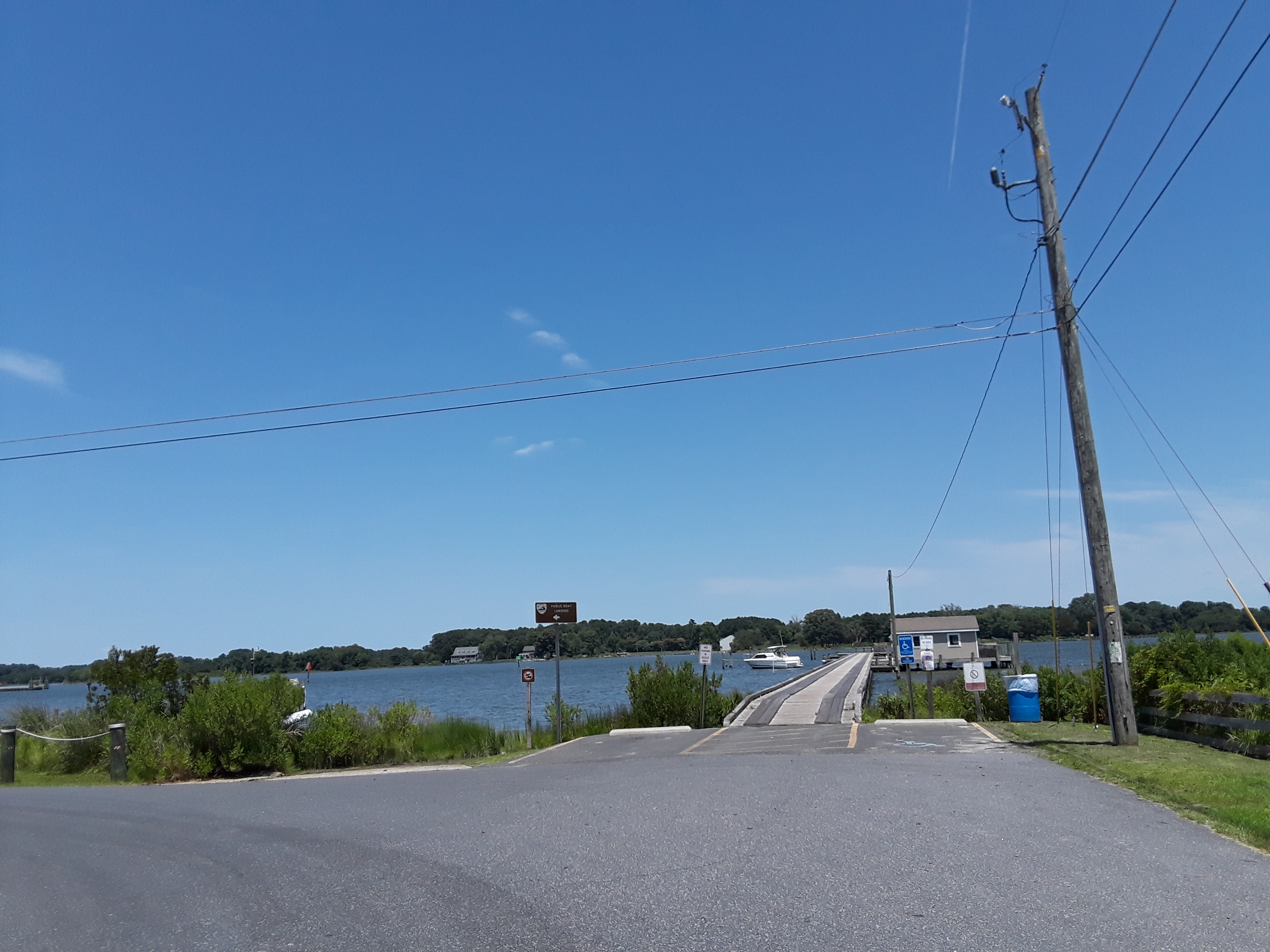
Boat landing along the Pungoteague at Harborton

Pungoteague Creek is a creek in Accomack County, Virginia, United States. Pungoteague Creek Light and Pungoteague, Virginia are named after this creek.

== 18th century ==
The Tobacco Inspection Act of 1730 declared that a tobacco inspection warehouse should be placed "On the head of Pungoteague, at Addison's landing; at Pitt's landing, upon Pokomoke; at Guilford, at Mr. Andrew's warehouse landing, in the county of Accomack, under one inspection".

== 19th century ==
During the War of 1812, on 30 May 1814, Rear Admiral George Cockburn's British forces invaded Pungoteague Creek from the Chesapeake Bay. The Corps of Colonial Marines battled from Onancock Creek to Pungoteague Creek. The troops later retreated to their base at Tangier Island

During the American Civil War, blockade runners used Pungoteague Creek and other nearby waterways to get supplies to the Confederacy despite the Union blockade at Hampton Roads.

== See also ==
- List of rivers of Virginia
