= Wachapreague people =

Wachaprague people
Total population
- Extinct as a tribe

Regions with significant populations
- Coastal Virginia

Languages
- Algonquian

Religion
- Native religion

The Wachapreague people were an Algonquian Native American people who lived in coastal Virginia centuries ago.

The town of Wachapreague, Virginia, and the Wachapreague Channel are named for them.

Captain John Smith reported contact with these Indians.
