= Shepherd's Plain =

Historic house in Virginia, United States

- U.S. National Register of Historic Places
- Virginia Landmarks Register
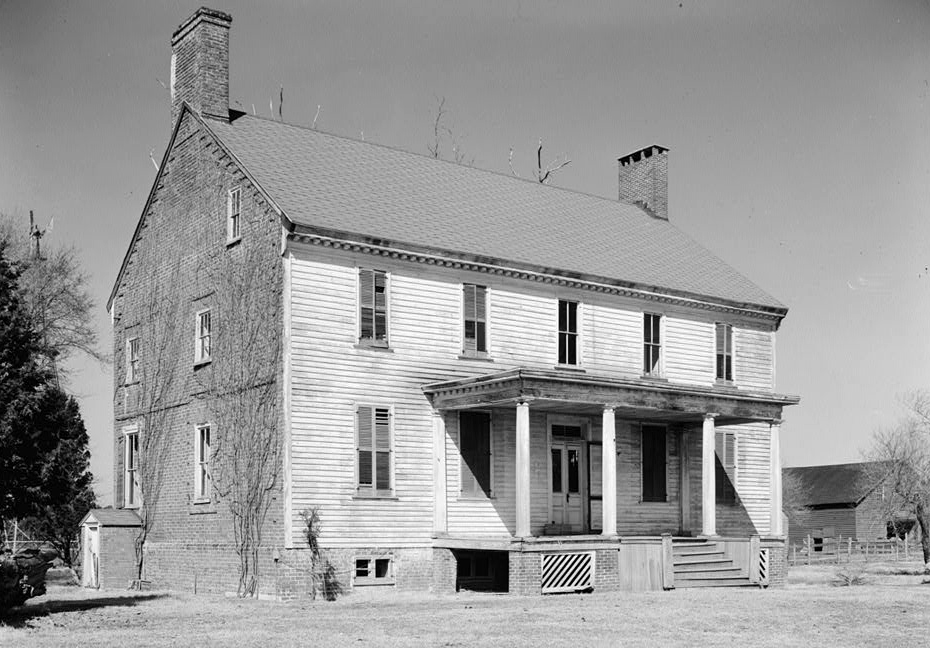
- Shepherd's Plain in 1960

- Location within Virginia Location within the United States
- Location: W of Pungoteague, near Pungoteague, Virginia
- Coordinates: 37°37′44″N 75°50′22″W
- Area: 46 acres (19 ha)
- Built: c. 1765
- Architectural style: Georgian
- NRHP reference No.: 82004531
- VLR No.: 001-0032

Significant dates
- Added to NRHP: June 28, 1982
- Designated VLR: October 21, 1980

Shepherd's Plain, also known as Melrose, is a historic home located near Pungoteague, Accomack County, Virginia. It was built between 1755 and 1775, and is a two-story, five bay rectangular Georgian-style dwelling with brick ends with interior end chimneys and frame fronts. It measures 39 feet by 54 feet, and has a gable roof. The interior has a central passage plan and features notable paneling in the formal parlor. It was built for Edward Ker, a prominent Accomack County planter and politician.

It was added to the National Register of Historic Places in 1982.
