= Bunting Place =

Historic house in Virginia, United States

- U.S. National Register of Historic Places
- Virginia Landmarks Register
- Location within Virginia Location within the United States
- Location: 31181 Drummondtown Rd., Wachapreague, Virginia
- Coordinates: 37°37′17″N 75°41′34″W
- Area: 35 acres (14 ha)
- Built: 1826
- Architectural style: Federal
- NRHP reference No.: 03000210
- VLR No.: 001-0017

Significant dates
- Added to NRHP: April 11, 2003
- Designated VLR: December 4, 2002

Bunting Place, also known as Mapp Farm and Nickawampus Farm, is a historic home and farm located at Wachapreague, Accomack County, Virginia.

== History ==
The farm was built about 1826.

It was added to the National Register of Historic Places in 2003.

== Description ==
The farm is a two-story, five-bay, brick-ended frame house.

It sits on a raised Flemish bond brick foundation with cellar, and has a medium pitched gable roof. The house has Federal style details.

Attached to the main block is a 1 1/2-story frame wing that provided original service to the house and serves presently as a modern kitchen. Attached to the wing are two additional sections extending the main block in a stepped or telescope form. Also on the property are a contributing gable-front frame barn and a rectangular frame corn house, as well as a small family cemetery with four burials.
