= Pungoteague Creek Light =

Lighthouse in Virginia, United States

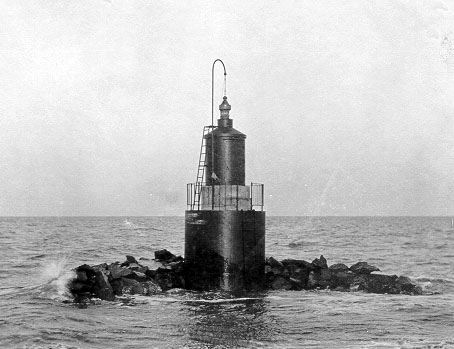
- Location: SW of the mouth of Pungoteague Creek in the Chesapeake Bay
- Coordinates: 37.6630°N 75.8980°W

Tower
- Foundation: screw-pile
- Construction: cast-iron/wood
- Shape: hexagonal house

Light
- First lit: 1854
- Deactivated: 1856

The Pungoteague Creek Light was a small screwpile lighthouse constructed in the Chesapeake Bay in 1854. Destroyed in 1856, it had the shortest recorded existence of any lighthouse on the Bay, and possibly the United States, at just 459 days.

The lighthouse was built just offshore from Accomack County, Virginia, and was located near the mouth of Pungoteague Creek, then called the Pungoteague River. It was the first screwpile lighthouse built on the Chesapeake, and its construction was overseen by Major Hartman Bache. Most of the foundation was prefabricated in Philadelphia, and was sent, along with the construction crew, down the Bay from Baltimore on April 23, 1854. It was originally estimated that construction of the light would take only six weeks, but lengthy calms during the voyage combined with the crew's inexperience and difficulty in sinking the piles extended the process to almost six months.

The lighthouse was finished and commissioned on November 1, 1854. A small structure, it sat on seven pneumatic piles, and was equipped with a fifth-order Fresnel lens. It was overturned by an ice floe on February 2, 1856. Nobody was injured as the lighthouse was close enough to shore to make rescue of the keeper fairly easy; the structure, though, was a complete loss.

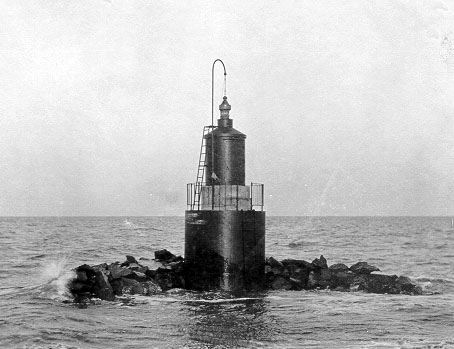
the 1908 caisson light (USCG)

Title was sought, and granted, for the construction of a new lighthouse, and $5,000 were set aside to cover costs. But it was soon decided that maritime traffic did not really justify the reconstruction of the tower, and the monies reverted to the Department of the Treasury. A privately maintained beacon was located at the same site until 1908, at which point an automated, flashing light on a concrete-filled caisson was erected by the government for $8,000.

The destruction of the Pungoteague River Light led to further efforts being made to protect screwpile lighthouses with riprap.
