= USS Wachapreague =

Tender of the United States Navy

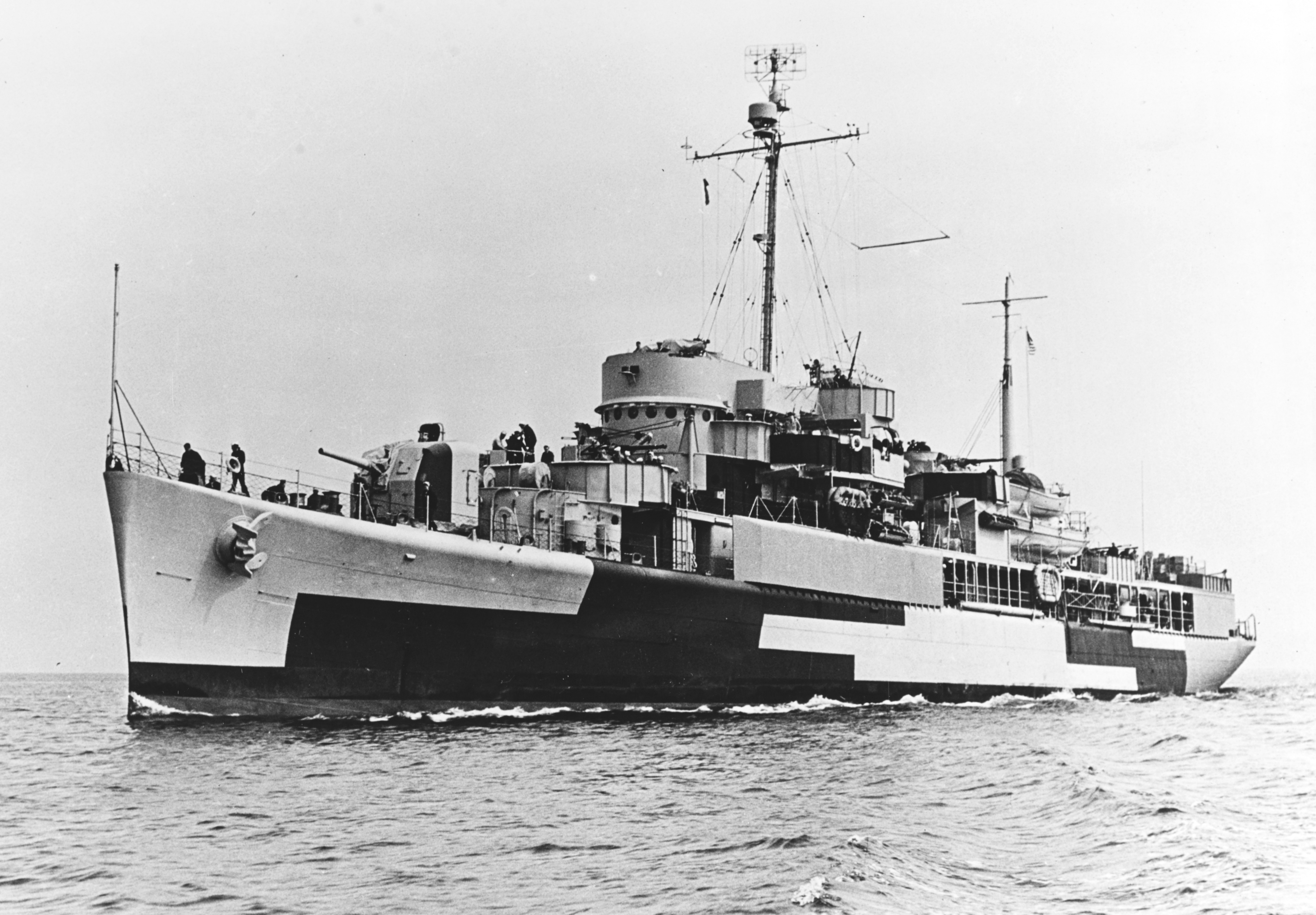
- USS Wachapreague (AGP-8) on 20 May 1944, three days after commissioning

History

United States
- Name: USS Wachapreague (AVP-56)
- Namesake: The Wachapreague Channel, an inlet on the eastern shore of Virginia
- Builder: Lake Washington Shipyard, Houghton, Washington
- Laid down: 1 February 1943
- Launched: 10 July 1943
- Sponsored by: Mrs. E. L. Barr
- Reclassified: Motor torpedo boat tender (AGP-8) on 2 February 1943
- Commissioned: 17 May 1944
- Decommissioned: 10 May 1946
- Honors and awards: Four battle stars for her World War II service
- Fate: Transferred to United States Coast Guard 27 May 1946
- Stricken: 5 June 1946
- Acquired: Transferred from U.S. Coast Guard 21 June 1972
- Fate: Transferred to South Vietnam 21 June 1972

United States
- Name: USCGC McCulloch
- Namesake: Hugh McCulloch (1808–1895), United States Secretary of the Treasury (1865–1869, 1884–1885)
- Acquired: By transfer from United States Navy 27 May 1946
- Commissioned: 25 November 1946
- Reclassified: High endurance cutter, WHEC-386, 1 May 1966
- Decommissioned: 21 June 1972
- Honors and awards: Unit Commendation April 1966
- Fate: Transferred to U.S. Navy 21 June 1972

South Vietnam
- Name: RVNS Ngô Quyền (HQ-17)
- Namesake: Ngô Quyền, who expelled Chinese forces in 938 to become the first ruler of an independent Vietnam
- Acquired: 21 June 1972
- Fate: Fled to Philippines on collapse of South Vietnam April 1975; Formally transferred to Republic of the Philippines 5 April 1976

Philippines
- Name: RPS Gregorio del Pilar (PF-8)
- Namesake: Gregorio del Pilar (1875–1899), a Filipino revolutionary general
- Acquired: 5 April 1976
- Commissioned: 7 February 1977
- Renamed: BRP Gregorio del Pilar (PF-8) June 1980
- Decommissioned: June 1985
- Reclassified: PF-12, 1987
- Recommissioned: 1987
- Decommissioned: April 1990
- Fate: Discarded July 1990; probably scrapped

General characteristics (seaplane tender)
- Class & type: Barnegat-class seaplane tender, converted during construction into a motor torpedo boat tender
- Displacement: 1,766 tons (light); 2,592 tons (full load)
- Length: 310 ft 9 in (94.72 m)
- Beam: 41 ft 1 in (12.52 m)
- Draft: 13 ft 6 in (4.11 m)
- Installed power: 6,000 horsepower (4.48 megawatts)
- Propulsion: Diesel engines, two shafts
- Speed: 18.2 knots
- Complement: 246
- Sensors & processing systems: Radar; sonar
- Armament: 2 × 5-inch (127-millimeter) gun; 8 × 40-millimeter anti-aircraft guns; 8 × 20-millimeter antiaircraft guns; 2 × depth charge tracks

General characteristics (Coast Guard cutter)
- Class & type: Casco-class cutter
- Displacement: 2,470.3 tons (full load) in 1966
- Length: 310 ft 0.25 in (94.4944 m) overall; 300 ft 0 in (91.44 m) between perpendiculars
- Beam: 41 ft 0 in (12.50 m) maximum
- Draft: 12 ft 5 in (3.78 m) at full load in 1966
- Installed power: 6,400 bhp (4,800 kW)
- Propulsion: Fairbanks-Morse geared diesel engines, two shafts; 166,430 US gallons (630,000 L) of fuel
- Speed: 17.6 knots (32.6 km/h) (maximum sustained in 1966); 11.7 knots (21.7 km/h) (economic in 1966)
- Range: 9,700 nautical miles (18,000 km) at 17.6 kn (32.6 km/h) in 1966; 16,000 nautical miles (30,000 km) at 11.7 kn (21.7 km/h) in 1966
- Complement: 151 (10 officers, 3 warrant officers, 138 enlisted personnel) in 1966
- Sensors & processing systems: Radars in 1966: SPS-23, SPS-29D; Sonar in 1966: SQS-1
- Armament: In 1966: 1 x single 5-inch (130 mm) 38-caliber Mark 30–65 gun mount, 1 x Mark 52-3 director, 1 x Mark 26-01 fire-control radar, 2 x .50-caliber (12.7 mm) machine guns; 1 × Mark 4 Mod 0 Hedgehog antisubmarine projector; 1 × Mark 11 Mod 0 antisubmarine projector, 2 x Mark 32 Mod 5 torpedo launchers with three torpedo tubes each

General characteristics (South Vietnamese frigate)
- Class & type: Trần Quang Khải-class frigate
- Displacement: 1,766 tons (standard); 2,800 tons (full load)
- Length: 310 ft 9 in (94.72 m) (overall); 300 ft 0 in (91.44 m) waterline
- Beam: 41 ft 1 in (12.52 m)
- Draft: 13 ft 5 in (4.09 m)
- Installed power: 6,080 horsepower (4.54 megawatts)
- Propulsion: 2 x Fairbanks Morse 38D diesel engines
- Speed: approximately 18 knots (maximum)
- Complement: approximately 200
- Armament: 1 × 5-inch/38-caliber (127-millimeter) dual-purpose gun; 1 or 2 x 81-millimeter mortars in some ships; Several machine guns

General characteristics Philippine frigate
- Class & type: Andrés Bonifacio-class frigate
- Displacement: 1,766 tons (standard); 2,800 tons (full load)
- Length: 311.65 ft (94.99 m)
- Beam: 41.18 ft (12.55 m)
- Draft: 13.66 ft (4.16 m)
- Installed power: 6,200 brake horsepower (4.63 megawatts)
- Propulsion: 2 × Fairbanks-Morse 38D diesel engines
- Speed: 18.2 knots (33.7 km/h; 20.9 mph) (maximum)
- Range: 8,000 nautical miles (15,000 km) at 15.6 knots (28.9 km/h)
- Complement: Approximately 200
- Sensors & processing systems: Sperry SPS-53 Surface Search Radar; Westinghouse AN/SPS-29D Air Search Radar; Mk.26 Mod.1 Fire Control System; Mk.52 Mod.3 Gun Director
- Armament: 1 × Mk.12 5-inch/38-caliber (127 mm) dual-purpose gun; 2 × Mk.1 Twin Bofors L/60 40 mm AA guns; 2 × Mk.3 Single Bofors L/60 40 mm AA guns; 4 × Twin Oerlikon 20 mm cannon; 4 × M2 Browning .50-caliber general-purpose machine guns; 2 × 81 mm Mortars
- Aircraft carried: None permanently assigned; helipad could accommodate one MBB Bo 105 Helicopter
- Aviation facilities: Helipad; no support facilities aboard

USS Wachapreague (AGP-8) was a motor torpedo boat tender in commission in the United States Navy from 1944 to 1946, seeing service in the latter part of World War II. After her Navy decommissioning, she was in commission in the United States Coast Guard from 1946 to 1972 as the cutter USCGC McCulloch (WAVP-386), later WHEC-386, the fourth ship of the U.S. Coast Guard or its predecessor, the United States Revenue Cutter Service, to bear the name. In 1972 she was transferred to South Vietnam and served in the Republic of Vietnam Navy as the frigate RVNS Ngô Quyền (HQ-17). Upon the collapse of South Vietnam at the end of the Vietnam War in 1975, she fled to the Philippines, and she served in the Philippine Navy from 1977 to 1985 as the frigate RPS (later BRP) Gregorio del Pilar (PF-8) and from 1987 to 1990 as BRP Gregorio del Pilar (PF-12).

== Construction and commissioning ==
Wachapreague (AVP-56) was laid down as a Barnegat-class seaplane tender on 1 February 1943 at Houghton Washington, by the Lake Washington Shipyard. She was reclassified as a motor torpedo boat tender and redesignated AGP-8 on 2 February 1943. She was launched on 10 July 1943, sponsored by Mrs. E. L. Barr, and commissioned on 17 May 1944.

== United States Navy service ==
=== World War II ===
Following her shakedown training out of San Diego, California, Wachapreague got underway on 18 July 1944 for Pearl Harbor, Hawaii, en route to the Southwest Pacific. Soon thereafter, she stopped briefly at Espiritu Santo, New Hebrides, and called at Brisbane, Australia, on 17 August 1944, before reaching her ultimate destination, Milne Bay, New Guinea, on 20 August 1944.

==== The New Guinea campaign ====
Wachapreague dropped anchor at Motor Torpedo Boat Base 21, at that time the largest patrol torpedo boat (PT boat) operating base in the Pacific. She reported to Commander, Motor Torpedo Boats, United States Seventh Fleet, and commenced tending the 10 PT boats of Motor Torpedo Boat Squadron (MTBRon) 12. This unit had previously taken a heavy toll of Japanese barge traffic and had wreaked much havoc upon Japanese shore installations in almost nightly actions during the New Guinea campaign. As Allied forces wrapped up the New Guinea operations, Wachapreague received an additional five PT boats from Motor Torpedo Boat Squadron 7 (MTBRon 7) as the Navy prepared for operations to liberate the Philippines from Japanese occupation.

==== The Philippines campaign ====
===== The Leyte campaign begins =====
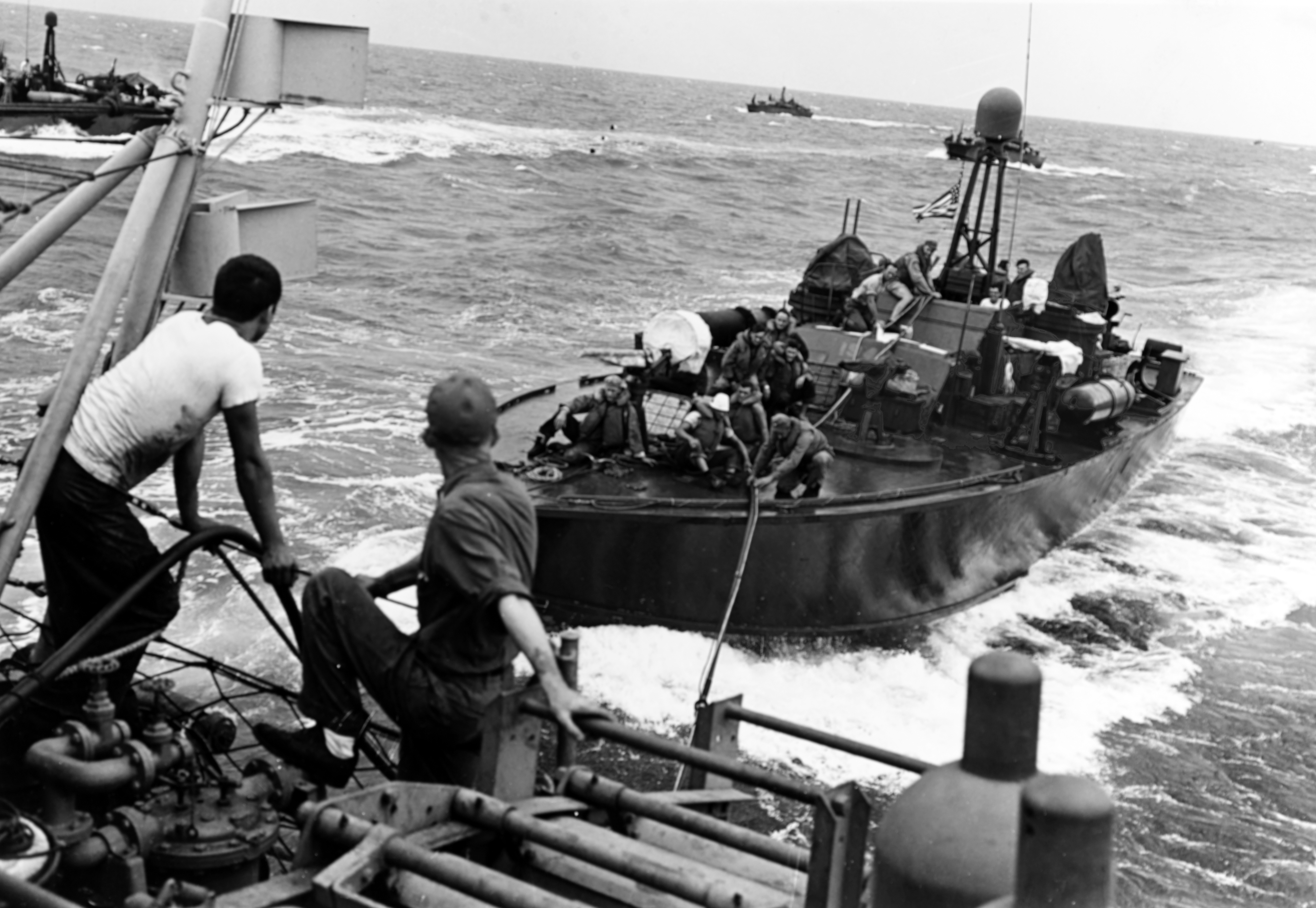
USS Wachapreague (AGP-8) refuels a PT boat on 20 October 1944 during the voyage from Palau to Leyte.

On 13 October 1944, Wachapreague sailed in company with the motor torpedo boat tenders USS Oyster Bay (AGP-6) and USS Willoughby (AGP-9), the seaplane tender USS Half Moon (AVP-26), and two United States Army craft for Leyte, 1,200 nautical miles (2,222 kilometers) away. The 45 torpedo boats, 15 of which were assigned to each motor torpedo boat tender, were convoyed by the larger ships, refuelled while underway at sea – with Wachapreague slowing to nine knots (17 km/h) periodically to fuel two torpedo boats simultaneously, one alongside to starboard and one astern, eventually replenishing the fuel supply of all 15 of her brood – and successfully completed the voyage under their own power. A brief two-day respite at Kossol Roads, Palau, for repairs and a further refueling of the PT boats, preceded the final leg of the voyage.

While Wachapreague dropped anchor at northern San Pedro Bay off Leyte, her PT boats, fresh and ready for action immediately, entered Leyte Gulf on 21 October 1944, the day after the initial landings on Leyte. On 24 October 1944, Wachapreague shifted to Liloan Bay, a small anchorage off Panoan Island, 65 nautical miles (120 kilometers) south of San Pedro Bay, which scarcely afforded the ship room to swing with the tide. Soon after her arrival at Liloan Bay, Wachapreague contacted the Philippine guerrilla radio network for a mutual exchange of information as to Japanese forces in the area.

===== The Battle of Leyte Gulf =====
On the afternoon of 24 October 1944, upon receipt of word that three powerful Japanese task forces were approaching from three directions, PT boats tended by Wachapreague sped to action stations. In the van of the southern Japanese force steamed two battleships and a heavy cruiser, screened by four destroyers; 30 nautical miles (56 kilometers) behind came the second group, consisting of three cruisers and four destroyers. The American PT boats met the Japanese southern force head-on; three coordinated destroyer torpedo attacks soon followed; while American battleships and cruisers under Rear Admiral Jesse B. Oldendorf deployed across the northern end of Surigao Strait to "cross the T" of the Japanese ships. The devastation the American warships wreaked upon the Japanese force was nearly total. Only one Japanese ship, the destroyer Shigure, emerged from what became known as the Battle of Surigao Strait.

PT boats from MTBRon 12 then threw the second task group off balance at the head of the strait, slamming a torpedo into the side of the Japanese light cruiser Abukuma and forcing Abukuma out of the battle line, badly damaged. The Japanese flagship, the heavy cruiser Nachi, collided with another ship in the melee and found her own speed reduced to 18 knots (33 km/h). This second echelon of Japanese ships, correctly surmising that the first had fallen upon some hard times, then fled, hotly pursued by American planes which administered the coup de grace to sink the already crippled Abukuma and the destroyer Shiranuhi on 26 October 1944.

MTBron 12's actions and the Battle of Surigao Strait itself were part of the larger Battle of Leyte Gulf of 23 October to 26 October 1944, a decisive defeat of the Imperial Japanese Navy from which it never recovered. Yet, while the Japanese capacity for seaborne operations lessened, Japanese forces nevertheless could still strike back from the skies. While the crew of Wachapreague labored to repair the badly damaged torpedo boat PT-194 on 25 October 1944, a Japanese plane attacked the ship, only to be driven off by a heavy anti-aircraft barrage. Later that day, Wachapreague shifted to Hinunagan Bay for refueling operations that would enable her six PT boats to return to San Pedro Bay. Japanese nuisance attacks from the air continued, however, and a dive bomber attacked Wachapreague just as she was completing the refueling of PT-134. As PT-134 pulled away from Wachapreague's side, a Japanese bomb landed some 18 feet (5.5 meters) from the PT boat's stern, killing one man and wounding four on board PT-134. Moving out under cover of a smoke screen, Wachapreague vacated her anchorage just before 14 Japanese planes struck and, while clearing the bay, fired on three twin-engined Mitsubishi G4M (Allied reporting name "Betty") bombers, claiming two kills as one "Betty" crashed into the sea and a second, trailing smoke, crashed behind a nearby island.

===== The Leyte Campaign concludes =====
Wachapreague arrived at San Pedro Bay late on 26 October 1944 and conducted tending operations at that site until 13 November 1944. During this time, her PT boats operated with devastating effect against Japanese shipping in the Ormoc Bay and Mindanao Sea areas. On 13 November 1944, her task completed in those waters for the time being, Wachapreague sailed in company with Willoughby for Mios Woendi. Returning two weeks later, Wachapreague now tended a total of 22 PT boats from MTBRons 13, 16, and 28, as well as six more from MTBRon 36 and two from MTBRon 17, at San Pedro Bay. Wachapreague remained at San Pedro until 4 January 1945, when she headed for Lingayen, on Luzon, in company with MTBRons 28 and 36.

==== The Luzon campaign ====
At 12:00 hours, 12 January 1945, a Japanese suicide aircraft dived into a merchant ship 100 yards (91 meters) ahead of Wachapreague. At dusk, seven Japanese planes attacked; one of them crashed in the sea some 100 yards (91 meters) ahead of Wachapreague, another came under fire as it plunged toward the merchant ship SS Kyle V. Johnson, and a third headed for Wachapreague, only to be knocked into the sea by a heavy antiaircraft barrage. SS Kyle V. Johnson was hit amidship by a single Japanese kamikaze, killing 129 army engineers from the 1896th Engineer Aviation Battalion who were in transport below decks. Later that evening, PT-382 came alongside Wachapreague and transferred two men she had rescued from the water who had been blown overboard from Kyle V. Johnson during the earlier heavy air action.

Wachapreague entered Lingayen Gulf on 13 January 1945 and anchored near the town of Damortis, Santo Tomas, La Union. On 16 January 1945, she shifted her anchorage to Port Sual to tend PT boats from MTBRons 28 and 36. These boats gradually extended their patrols northward to the coastal towns of Vigan City and Aparri, shelling shore installations and wreaking havoc on Japanese barge traffic and shipping along the northwest coast of Luzon, destroying some 20 barges. Wachapreague meanwhile continued to make all electrical and engine repairs for the squadron PT boats and handled all major communications for the motor torpedo boat squadrons until she departed Lingayen on 12 March 1945 to replenish at Leyte.

==== The Borneo campaign ====
Underway again on 23 April 1945, Wachapreague accompanied MTBRon 36 to Dutch North Borneo and took part in the invasion of Tarakan Island. While the guns still pounded the shore and the invasion itself was underway, Wachapreague entered the Tarakan Bay on 1 May 1945 to establish an advance base for her PT boats. For the next four months, until the surrender of Japan on 15 August 1945 that ended World War II, Wachapreague operated from this bay, tending MTBRon 36 PT boats while they in turn conducted daily offensive runs up the coast of Borneo.

In the course of these operations, the PT boats sought out and destroyed Japanese shipping at Tawao, Cowie Harbor, and Noneokan, Dutch North Borneo, shelling and rocketing shore installations. As the Japanese later attempted evacuation by small boats and rafts, the PT boats netted some 30 prisoners-of-war. In addition to these tasks, the PT boats assisted tank landing ship tank (LST) retractions from the beachheads by speeding across the water astern of the landing ships and creating swells which enabled the LSTs to back off the beach and float free.

==== Honors and awards ====
Wachapreague received four battle stars for her World War II service.

=== Post-World War II ===
Wachapreague tended PT boats after the end of the war, based at Tarakan, until she headed back to the United States and arrived at San Francisco, California, on 5 December 1945. After upkeep at the Mare Island Naval Shipyard at Vallejo, California, Wachapreague got underway for the United States East Coast on 20 March 1946 and reported at Boston, Massachusetts, on 6 April 1946 for inactivation. She was decommissioned on 10 May 1946 and transferred outright to the United States Coast Guard on 27 May 1946. Her name was struck from the Navy List on 5 June 1946.

== United States Coast Guard service ==
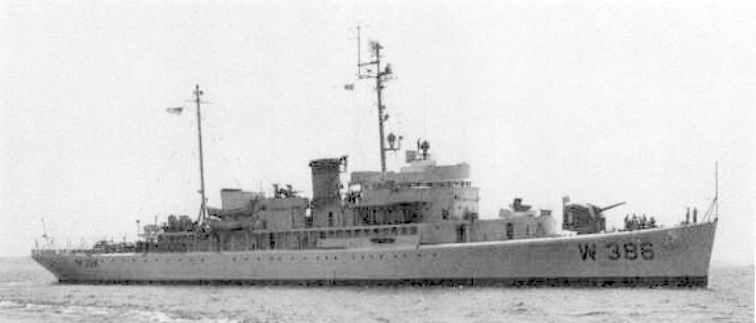
USCGC McCulloch (WAVP-386) in the Atlantic sometime between May 1946 and the Coast Guard's 1967 adoption of the "racing stripe" markings on its ships.

Barnegat-class ships were very reliable and seaworthy and had good habitability, and the United States Coast Guard viewed them as ideal for ocean-station duty, in which they would perform weather reporting and search and rescue tasks, once they were modified by having a balloon shelter added aft and having oceanographic equipment, an oceanographic winch, and a hydrographic winch installed. After World War II, the Navy transferred 18 of the ships to the Coast Guard, in which they were known as the Casco-class cutters.

After the Navy transferred Wachapreague to the Coast Guard on 27 May 1946, she underwent conversion for service as a weather reporting ship. The Coast Guard commissioned her as USCGC McCulloch (WAVP-386) on 25 November 1946. She was the fourth ship of the U.S. Coast Guard or its predecessor, the United States Revenue Cutter Service, to bear the name, which honored the financier Hugh McCulloch (1808–1895), who served as United States Secretary of the Treasury under Presidents Abraham Lincoln and Andrew Johnson from 1865 to 1869 and Chester A. Arthur from 1884 to 1885.

=== North Atlantic, 1946–1972 ===
McCulloch's first home port was Boston, Massachusetts, where she would remain stationed until July 1966. Her primary duty was to serve on ocean stations in the Atlantic Ocean to gather meteorological data. While on duty in one of these stations, she was required to patrol a 210-square-mile (544-square-kilometer) area for three weeks at a time, leaving the area only when physically relieved by another Coast Guard cutter or in the case of a dire emergency. Spending an average of 21 days per month at sea, McCulloch patrolled the direct line of air routes to Europe, acting as an aircraft check point at the point of no return, relayed weather data to the United States Weather Bureau and acted as a source of the latest weather information for passing aircraft, and maintained an air-sea rescue station for downed civilian and military aircraft and vessels in distress. She also operated as a floating oceanographic laboratory and engaged in law enforcement operations. McCulloch remained engaged in these duties until more modern techniques of weather reporting and data gathering came into use and made seagoing weather ships obsolete.

While McCulloch was patrolling Ocean Station Bravo off the coast of Labrador, Canada, in January 1959, raging winter seas cracked her main decks and swept one crewman overboard. In spite of that harrowing experience, she managed to reach Naval Station Argentia in Newfoundland, Canada, without further mishap.

During October and November 1965, McCulloch was assigned to patrol the Florida Strait and rescue Cuban refugees during the Cuban Exodus, in which thousands of Cubans chanced the rough, hazardous 90-nautical-mile (170 km) passage from Camarioca, Cuba, to Key West, Florida, many in overcrowded and unseaworthy craft handled by totally inexperienced people. During this patrol, McCulloch was under the command of Commander Frank Barnett, USCG, who was in tactical command of 12 Coast Guard cutters and four airplanes assigned to the Cuban Patrol. In early November 1965, McCulloch rescued 280 Cuban refugees from small craft in the Florida Strait and carried them to Key West. The crew was cited for outstanding service during this patrol and, on 22 April 1966, McCulloch was awarded a Unit Commendation for her Florida Strait patrol, with ceremonies held at Boston, entitling her crew of 144 to wear the Unit Commendation Bar.

On 1 May 1966, McCulloch was reclassified as a high endurance cutter and redesignated WHEC-386. In July 1966, she was stationed at Wilmington, North Carolina, which would remain her home port until 21 June 1972. Just as during her years at Boston, she spent her years at Wilmington in ocean station, law-enforcement, and search-and-rescue operations.

On 17 June 1970, McCulloch helped fight a fire aboard the merchant ship Tsui Yung in Wilmington.

=== Decommissioning and transfer to South Vietnam ===
In April 1972, McCulloch and two of her sister ships, the Coast Guard cutters USCGC Absecon and USCGC Chincoteague, were deployed as Coast Guard Squadron Two, with crews composed mainly of members of the United States Coast Guard Reserve. They were originally scheduled to sail to Subic Bay in the Philippines, but were diverted to the U.S. Navy base at Apra Harbor, Guam. After their antisubmarine warfare equipment had been removed, the three cutters eventually were decommissioned, transferred to the U.S. Navy, and then transferred to South Vietnam, all three of these events happening for McCulloch on 21 June 1972.

== Republic of Vietnam Navy service ==
The former McCulloch was commissioned into the Republic of Vietnam Navy as the frigate RVNS Ngô Quyền (Note: Other spellings encountered include Ngo Kuyen.) (HQ-17), (Note: Per Janes's Fighting Ships 1973–1974, p. 592, "HQ" is an abbreviation for "Hai Quan," Vietnamese for "Navy", used for all Republic of Vietnam Navy ships.) (Note: This article assumes that the authoritative Jane's Fighting Ships 1973–1974, p. 592, is correct about the ship's lineage (i.e., that she was the former USS Wachapreague (AGP-8) and USCGC McCulloch (WAVP-386/WHEC-386) and was designated HQ-17 in South Vietnamese service. The Dictionary of American Naval Fighting Ships (DANFS) and NavSource agree with Jane's. The United States Coast Guard Historian's Office and the Naval Historical Center Online Library of Selected Images also agree that Wachapreague/McCulloch became Ngô Quyền, but do not mention Ngô Quyền's "HQ" designation. However, confusion exists on these points in print and on the Web. Conway's All the World's Fighting Ships 1947–1982 Part II: The Warsaw Pact and Non-Aligned Nations, p. 369, agrees that Ngô Quyền was the former Wachapreague/McCulloch, but claims Ngô Quyền's designation in South Vietnamese service was HQ-6, a designation that Jane's, p. 592, and NavSource say was assigned to RVNS Trần Quốc Toản (HQ-06), which they say was the former USS Cook Inlet (AVP-36) and USCGC Cook Inlet (WAVP-384/WHEC-384). The Inventory of VNN's Battle Ships Part 2 (see Part 2 ), however, claims that Ngô Quyền (HQ-17) was the former USS Castle Rock (AVP-35) and USCGC Castle Rock (WAVP-383/WHEC-383), while the other sources (less DANFS, which does not mention Castle Rock's South Vietnamese career) all agree that Castle Rock became RVNS Trần Bình Trọng (HQ-05) in South Vietnamese service (although NavSource in its entry for USS Chincoteague (AVP-24) / USCGC Chincoteague (WAVP-375/WHEC-375) also says that it was Chincoteague that became Trần Bình Trọng (HQ-05)). To complete the confusion, the Inventory of VNN's Battle Ships Part 1 (see Part 1 ) says that it was Wachapreague/McCulloch that became Trần Quốc Toản (HQ-06) in South Vietnamese service.) named after Ngô Quyền, who expelled Chinese forces in 938 and founded the first modern Vietnamese state. By mid-July 1972, six other former Casco-class cutters had joined her in South Vietnamese service. They were the largest warships in the South Vietnamese inventory, and their 5-inch (127-millimeter) guns were South Vietnam's largest naval guns. Ngô Quyền and her sisters fought alongside U.S. Navy ships during the final years of the Vietnam War, operating along the South Vietnamese coast on patrol and coastal interdiction duties and providing gunfire support to South Vietnamese forces ashore.

When South Vietnam collapsed at the end of the Vietnam War in late April 1975, Ngô Quyền became a ship without a country. She fled to Subic Bay in the Philippines, packed with South Vietnamese refugees. On 22 and 23 May 1975, a U.S. Coast Guard team inspected Ngô Quyền and five of her sister ships, which also had fled to the Philippines in April 1975. One of the inspectors noted: "These vessels brought in several hundred refugees and are generally rat-infested. They are in a filthy, deplorable condition. Below decks generally would compare with a garbage scow."

== Philippine Navy service ==
The Philippines took custody of Ngô Quyền and her sister ships. After she was cleaned up and repaired, the former Ngô Quyền was commissioned in the Philippine Navy on 7 February 1977 as the frigate RPS Gregorio del Pilar (PF-8). (Note: This article assumes that the authoritative Jane's Fighting Ships 1980–1981, p. 370, is correct about Gregorio del Pilar's lineage (i.e., that she was the former USS Wachapreague (AGP-8), USCGC McCulloch (WAVP-386/WHEC-386), and RVNS Ngô Quyền (HQ-17). The Dictionary of American Naval Fighting Ships (DANFS), NavSource, the United States Coast Guard Historian's Office , the Naval Historical Center Online Library of Selected Images , and Conway's All the World's Fighting Ships 1947–1982 Part II: The Warsaw Pact and Non-Aligned Nations, p. 356, all agree with Jane's that Wachapreague/McCulloch became Ngô Quyền and then Gregorio del Pilar. However, confusion exists on these points on the Web. The Inventory of VNN's Battle Ships Part 2 (see Part 2 ) claims that Ngô Quyền (HQ-17) was the former USS Castle Rock (AVP-35) and USCGC Castle Rock (WAVP-383/WHEC-383), while the other sources (less DANFS, which does not mention Castle Rock's South Vietnamese career) all agree that Castle Rock became RVNS Trần Bình Trọng (HQ-05) in South Vietnamese service (although NavSource in its entry for USS Chincoteague (AVP-24) / USCGC Chincoteague (WAVP-375/WHEC-375) also says that it was Chincoteague that became Trần Bình Trọng (HQ-05)). To complete the confusion, the Inventory of VNN's Battle Ships Part 1 (see Part 1 ) says that Wachapreague/McCulloch became RVNS Trần Quốc Toản (HQ-06) in South Vietnamese service and that Trần Quốc Toản became Gregorio del Pilar, while the Inventory of VNN's Battle Ships Part 2 (see Part 2 ) says that Ngô Quyền was the former Castle Rock and that Ngô Quyền went on to become the Philippine Navy's BRP Francisco Dagohoy (PF-10).) She and three other ex-Barnegat-class, ex-Casco-class ships that had fled South Vietnam constituted the Philippine Navy's Andrés Bonifacio class of frigates, the largest Philippine Navy combat ships of their time.

=== Modernization ===
The Andrés Bonifacio-class frigates were passed to the Philippine Navy with fewer weapons aboard than they had had during their U.S. Navy and U.S. Coast guard careers and with old surface search radars installed. The Philippine Navy addressed these shortfalls through modernization programs. In Philippine service, Gregorio del Pilar retained her South Vietnamese armament, consisting of a single Mark 12 5"/38 caliber (127-mm) gun, a dual-purpose weapon capable of anti-surface and anti-air fire, mounted in a Mark 30 Mod 0 enclosed base ring with a range of up to 18,200 yards (16,600 m) yards; two twin Mark 1 Bofors 40 mm anti-aircraft gun mounts, four Mk. 4 single 20-millimeter Oerlikon anti-aircraft gun mounts, four M2 Browning .50-caliber (12.7-millimeter) general-purpose machine guns, and two 81-mm mortars. However, in 1979 Hatch and Kirk, Inc., added a helicopter deck aft which could accommodate a Philippine Navy MBB Bo 105C helicopter for utility, scouting, and maritime patrol purposes, although the ship had no capability to refuel or otherwise support visiting helicopters. The Sperry SPS-53 surface search and navigation radar also was installed, replacing the AN/SPS-23 radar, although the ship retained both its AN/SPS-29D air search radar and its Mark 26 Mod 1 Fire Control Radar System. The Philippine Navy made plans to equip Gregorio del Pilar and her sister ships with new radar systems and long-range BGM-84 Harpoon anti-ship cruise missiles, but this upgrade did not materialize due to the worsening political and economic crisis in the Philippines in the mid-1980s.

=== Service history ===
Gregorio del Pilar was designated BRP Gregorio del Pilar (PF-8) in June 1980 and was decommissioned in June 1985. Redesignated PF-12, she was recommissioned in 1987, but she was decommissioned again in April 1990 due to her poor material condition. She was discarded in July 1990 and probably scrapped.
