= Wachapreague Channel =

Coordinates: 37°36′34″N 75°39′54″W

The Wachapreague Channel is an inlet on the Eastern Shore of the state of Virginia in the United States.

The channel winds from the town of Wachapreague, Virginia, through a seaside marsh, and out to barrier islands. Between Cedar Island and Parramore Island it reaches the Atlantic Ocean.

Easy access from the town of Wachapreague to the marsh and ocean makes the Wachapreague Channel a popular transit route for fishermen.

The name of the channel came from the Algonquian people who resided in the area centuries ago.

The United States Navy motor torpedo boat tender USS Wachapreague (AGP-8), which was in commission from 1943 to 1946 and saw action in World War II, was named for the channel.

== See also ==
- Wachapreague, Virginia
- USS Wachapreague (AGP-8)
