= Pennyville, Virginia =

Unincorporated community in Virginia, United States

Coordinates: 37°37′03″N 75°49′58″W

Pennyville is an unincorporated community in Accomack County, Virginia, United States.
