= Keller, Virginia =

- Town
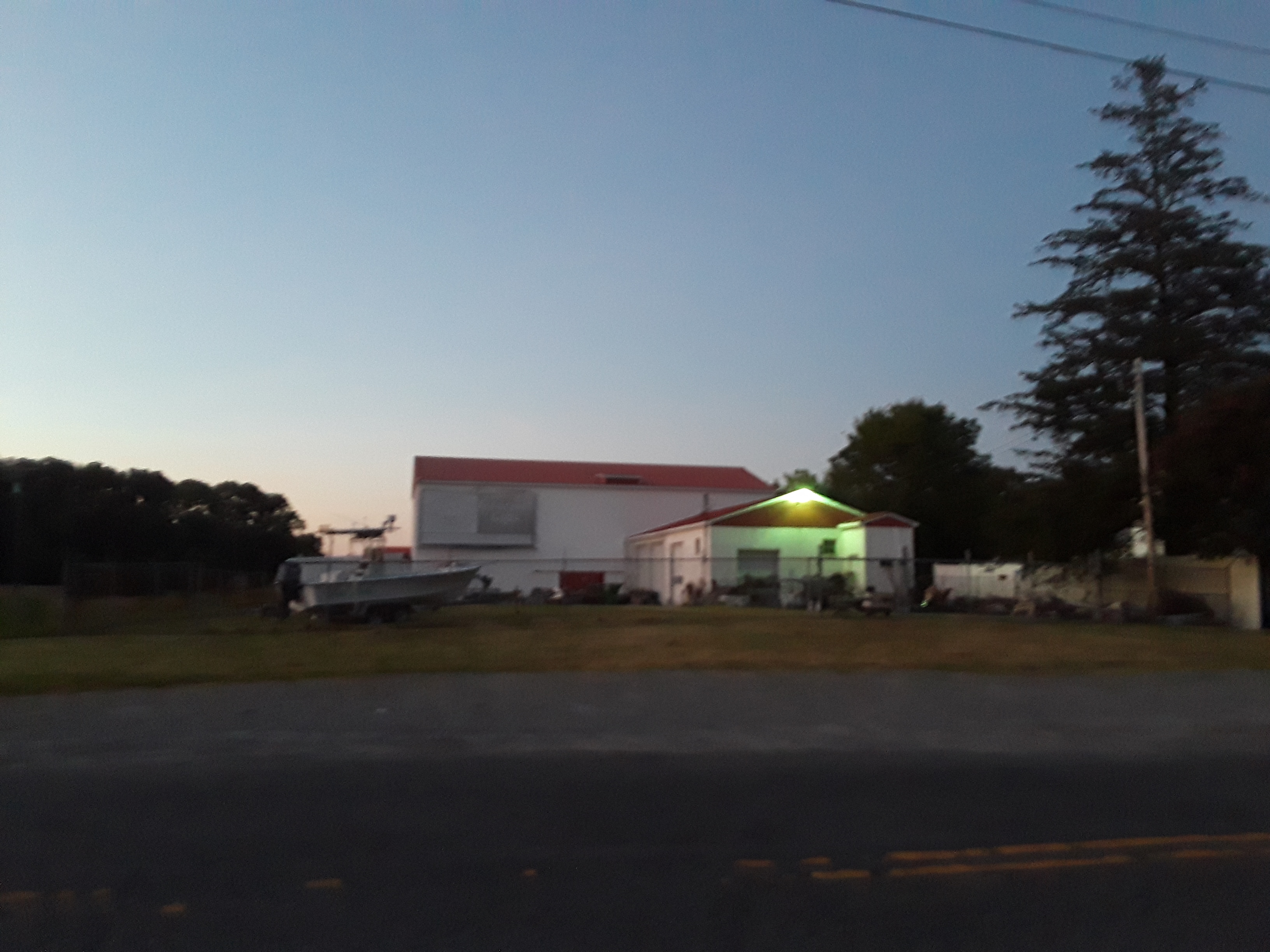
- Sunset in Keller, July 2018

- Location in Accomack County and the state of Virginia.
- Coordinates: 37°37′12″N 75°45′52″W
- Country: United States
- State: Virginia
- County: Accomack

Area
  - Total: 0.34 sq mi (0.89 km^{2})
  - Land: 0.34 sq mi (0.89 km^{2})
  - Water: 0 sq mi (0.00 km^{2})
- Elevation: 39 ft (12 m)

Population (2020)
  - Total: 144
  - Estimate (2019): 169
  - Density: 494.1/sq mi (190.78/km^{2})
- Time zone: UTC−5 (Eastern (EST))
  - Summer (DST): UTC−4 (EDT)
- ZIP code: 23401
- Area codes: 757, 948
- FIPS code: 51-41656
- GNIS feature ID: 1468935
- Website: https://www.kellerva.org/

Keller is a town in Accomack County, Virginia, United States. As of the 2020 census, Keller had a population of 144.

== Geography ==
Keller is located at 37°37′12″N 75°45′52″W (37.619897, −75.764312).

According to the United States Census Bureau, the town has a total area of 0.3 square mile (0.9 km^{2}), all land. It lies at an elevation of 39 feet.

== Demographics ==
Historical population
Census	Pop.	Note	%±
1960	263		—
1970	235		−10.6%
1980	236		0.4%
1990	235		−0.4%
2000	173		−26.4%
2010	178		2.9%
2020	144		−19.1%
U.S. Decennial Census

At the 2000 census there were 173 people, 77 households, and 45 families living in the town. The population density was 502.2 people per square mile (196.5/km^{2}). There were 90 housing units at an average density of 261.2 per square mile (102.2/km^{2}). The racial makeup of the town was 80.92% White, 12.72% African American, 0.58% Native American, 3.47% from other races, and 2.31% from two or more races. Hispanic or Latino of any race were 5.78%.

Of the 77 households 22.1% had children under the age of 18 living with them, 45.5% were married couples living together, 11.7% had a female householder with no husband present, and 40.3% were non-families. 29.9% of households were one person and 16.9% were one person aged 65 or older. The average household size was 2.25 and the average family size was 2.78.

The age distribution was 17.9% under the age of 18, 9.8% from 18 to 24, 35.3% from 25 to 44, 19.1% from 45 to 64, and 17.9% 65 or older. The median age was 40 years. For every 100 females, there were 90.1 males. For every 100 females aged 18 and over, there were 86.8 males.

The median household income was $25,500 and the median family income was $28,750. Males had a median income of $34,792 versus $25,938 for females. The per capita income for the town was $15,417. About 14.0% of families and 22.3% of the population were below the poverty line, including 34.5% of those under the age of eighteen and 14.3% of those sixty-five or over.

== Transportation ==
=== Major highways ===
- US 13
- SR 180

=== Public transportation ===
STAR Transit provides public transit services, linking Keller with Cape Charles, Onley, and other communities in Accomack and Northampton counties on the Eastern Shore.

=== Railroads ===
The Bay Coast Railroad provided Keller with freight rail service until going out of business in 2018.
