= Belle Haven, Accomack County, Virginia =

Belle Haven
- Town
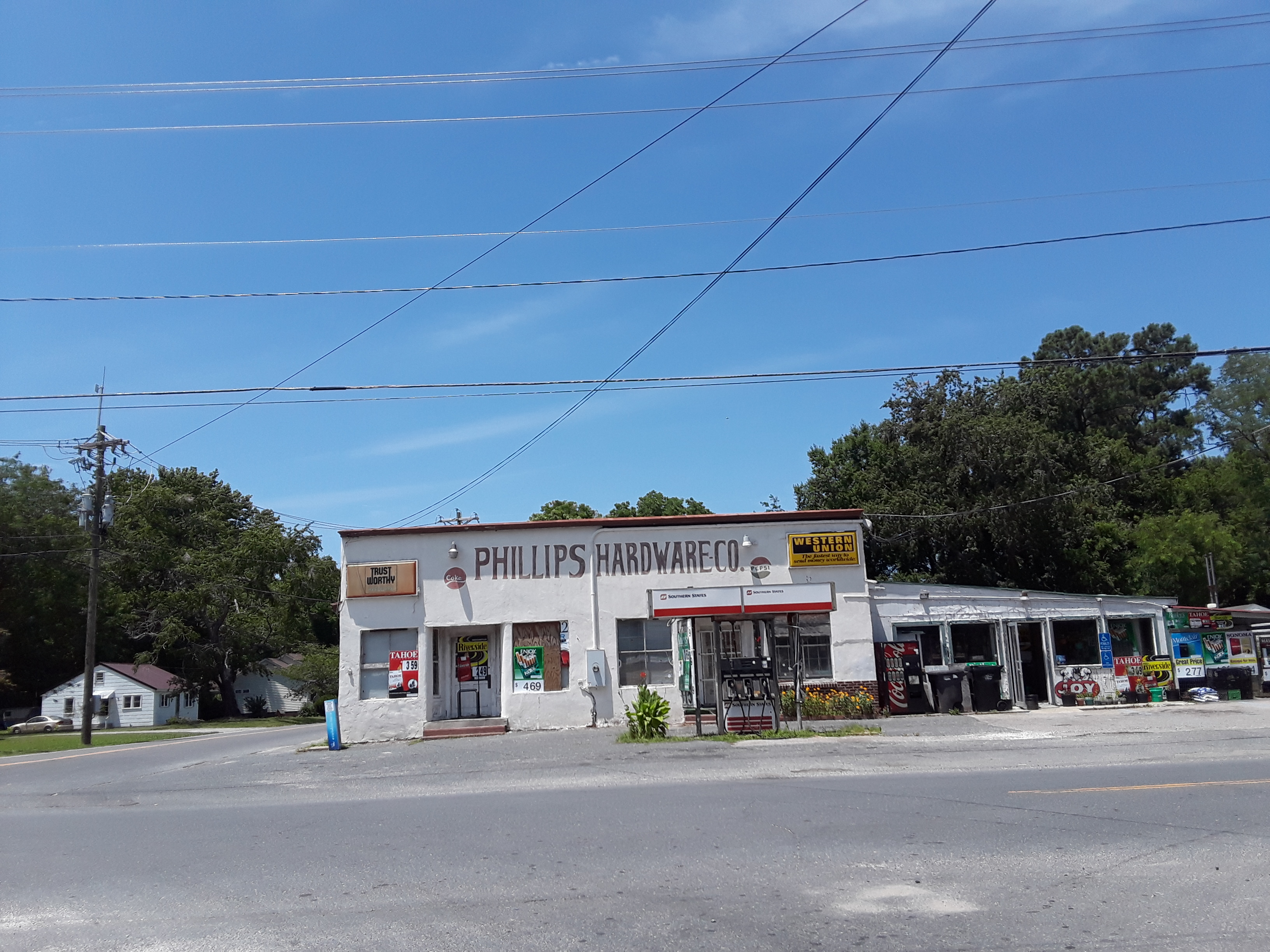
- Central Belle Haven, July 2018

- Location in Accomack County and the state of Virginia.
- Coordinates: 37°33′0″N 75°49′28″W
- Country: United States
- State: Virginia
- County: Accomack

Government
  - Type: Mayor-council government
  - Mayor: George H. Ludlow, Jr.

Area
  - Total: 1.61 sq mi (4.18 km^{2})
  - Land: 1.53 sq mi (3.96 km^{2})
  - Water: 0.085 sq mi (0.22 km^{2})
- Elevation: 30 ft (9.1 m)

Population (2010)
  - Total: 532
  - Estimate (2019): 502
  - Density: 327.9/sq mi (126.61/km^{2})
- Time zone: UTC−5 (Eastern (EST))
  - Summer (DST): UTC−4 (EDT)
- Area code: 23306
- FIPS code: 51-05912
- GNIS feature ID: 2390720

Belle Haven is a town in Accomack and Northampton counties in the U.S. state of Virginia. The population was 543 in the 2020 census.

== Geography ==
Belle Haven is located at 37°33′0″N 75°49′28″W (37.549989, −75.824329).

According to the United States Census Bureau, the town has a total area of 1.6 square miles (4.1 km^{2}), of which 1.5 square miles (3.9 km^{2}) is land and 0.077 square miles (0.2 km^{2}), or 5.24%, is water.

== Demographics ==
Historical population
Census	Pop.	Note	%±
1900	331		—
1910	296		−10.6%
1920	311		5.1%
1930	372		19.6%
1940	277		−25.5%
1950	453		63.5%
1960	371		−18.1%
1970	504		35.8%
1980	589		16.9%
1990	526		−10.7%
2000	480		−8.7%
2010	532		10.8%
2019 (est.)	502		−5.6%
U.S. Decennial Census

At the 2000 census there were 480 people, 220 households, and 139 families living in the town. The population density was 317.1 people per square mile (122.7/km^{2}). There were 248 housing units at an average density of 163.8 per square mile (63.4/km^{2}). The racial makeup of the town was 78.12% White, 19.38% African American, 0.83% Native American, 0.62% Asian, 0.62% from other races, and 0.42% from two or more races. Hispanic or Latino of any race were 0.83%.

Of the 220 households 25.9% had children under the age of 18 living with them, 44.1% were married couples living together, 18.2% had a female householder with no husband present, and 36.8% were non-families. 33.6% of households were one person and 17.7% were one person aged 65 or older. The average household size was 2.11 and the average family size was 2.62.

The age distribution was 20.4% under the age of 18, 6.0% from 18 to 24, 24.8% from 25 to 44, 27.3% from 45 to 64, and 21.5% 65 or older. The median age was 44 years. For every 100 females, there were 79.1 males. For every 100 females age 18 and over, there were 69.8 males.

The median household income was $33,500 and the median family income was $37,250. Males had a median income of $26,750 versus $21,146 for females. The per capita income for the town was $17,009. About 7.2% of families and 8.9% of the population were below the poverty line, including 1.1% of those under age 18 and 25.6% of those age 65 or over.

== Transportation ==
=== Major highways ===
- SR 178
- SR 181

=== Public transportation ===
STAR Transit provides public transit services, linking Belle Haven with Cape Charles, Onley, and other communities in Accomack and Northampton counties on the Eastern Shore.
