= Harborton, Virginia =

Census-designated place in Virginia, US

- Census-designated place
- Location in Accomack County and the state of Virginia.

- Location within Virginia Location within the United States
- Coordinates: 37°39′35″N 75°49′59″W
- Country: United States
- State: Virginia
- County: Accomack
- Elevation: 7 ft (2.1 m)

Population (2020)
  - Total: 130
- Time zone: UTC-5 (Eastern (EST))
  - Summer (DST): UTC-4 (EDT)
- GNIS feature ID: 2584855

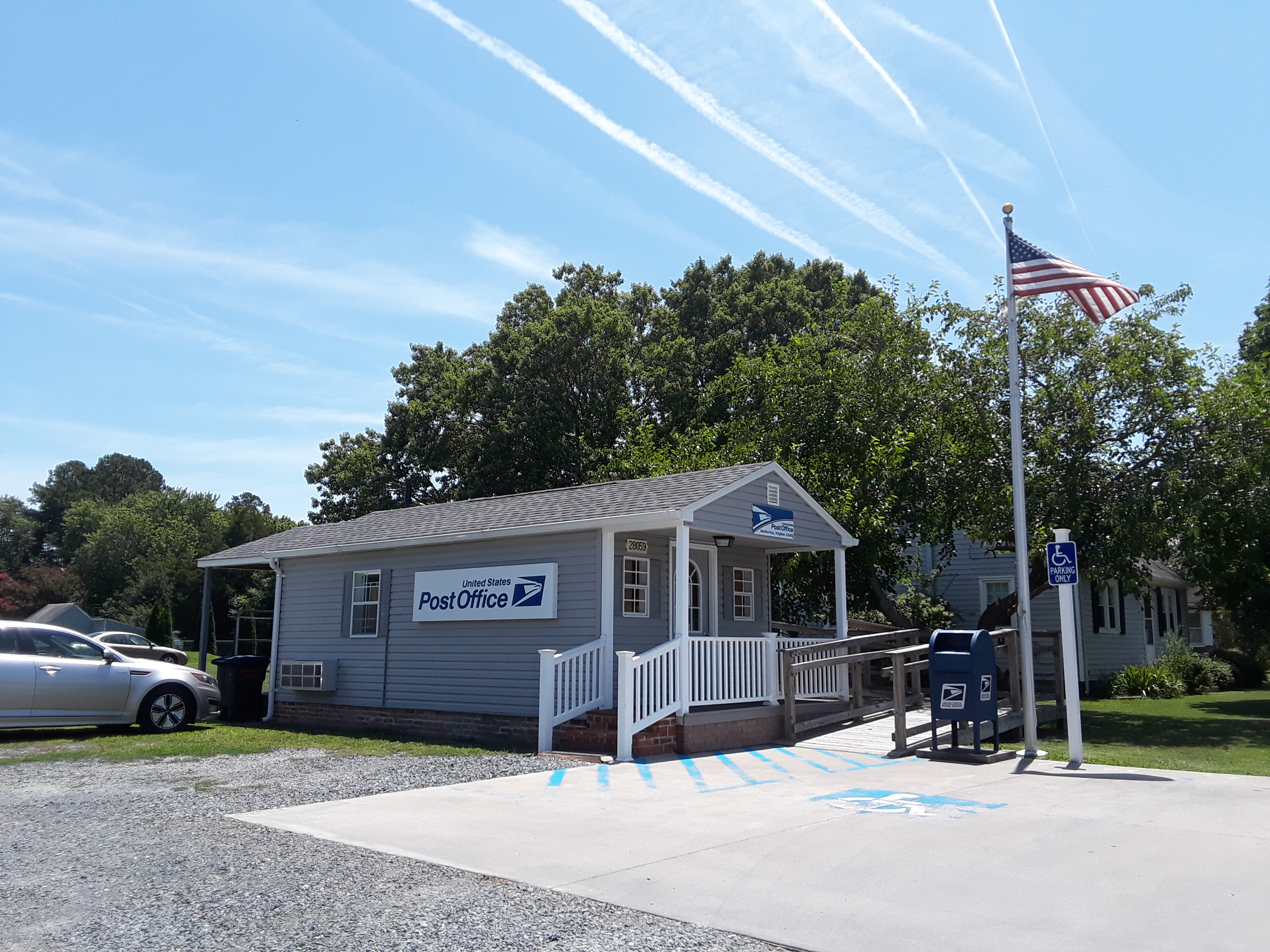
Harborton post office, July 2018

Harborton is a census-designated place (CDP) in Accomack County, Virginia, United States. Per the 2020 census, the population was 130.

== Geography ==
The CDP lies at an elevation of 7 feet.

== Demographics ==
Historical population
Census	Pop.	Note	%±
2010	131		—
2020	130		−0.8%
U.S. Decennial Census; 2010 2020

Harbortown was first listed as a census designated place in the 2010 U.S. census.

=== 2020 census ===
Harborton CDP, Virginia – Racial and ethnic composition Note: the US Census treats Hispanic/Latino as an ethnic category. This table excludes Latinos from the racial categories and assigns them to a separate category. Hispanics/Latinos may be of any race.
Race / Ethnicity (NH = Non-Hispanic)	Pop 2010	Pop 2020	% 2010	% 2020
White alone (NH)	120	109	91.60%	83.85%
Black or African American alone (NH)	10	4	7.63%	3.08%
Native American or Alaska Native alone (NH)	0	1	0.00%	0.77%
Asian alone (NH)	0	0	0.00%	0.00%
Pacific Islander alone (NH)	0	0	0.00%	0.00%
Some Other Race alone (NH)	0	0	0.00%	0.00%
Mixed Race or Multi-Racial (NH)	0	9	0.00%	6.92%
Hispanic or Latino (any race)	1	7	0.76%	5.38%
Total	131	130	100.00%	100.00%
