= Wachapreague, Virginia =

- Town
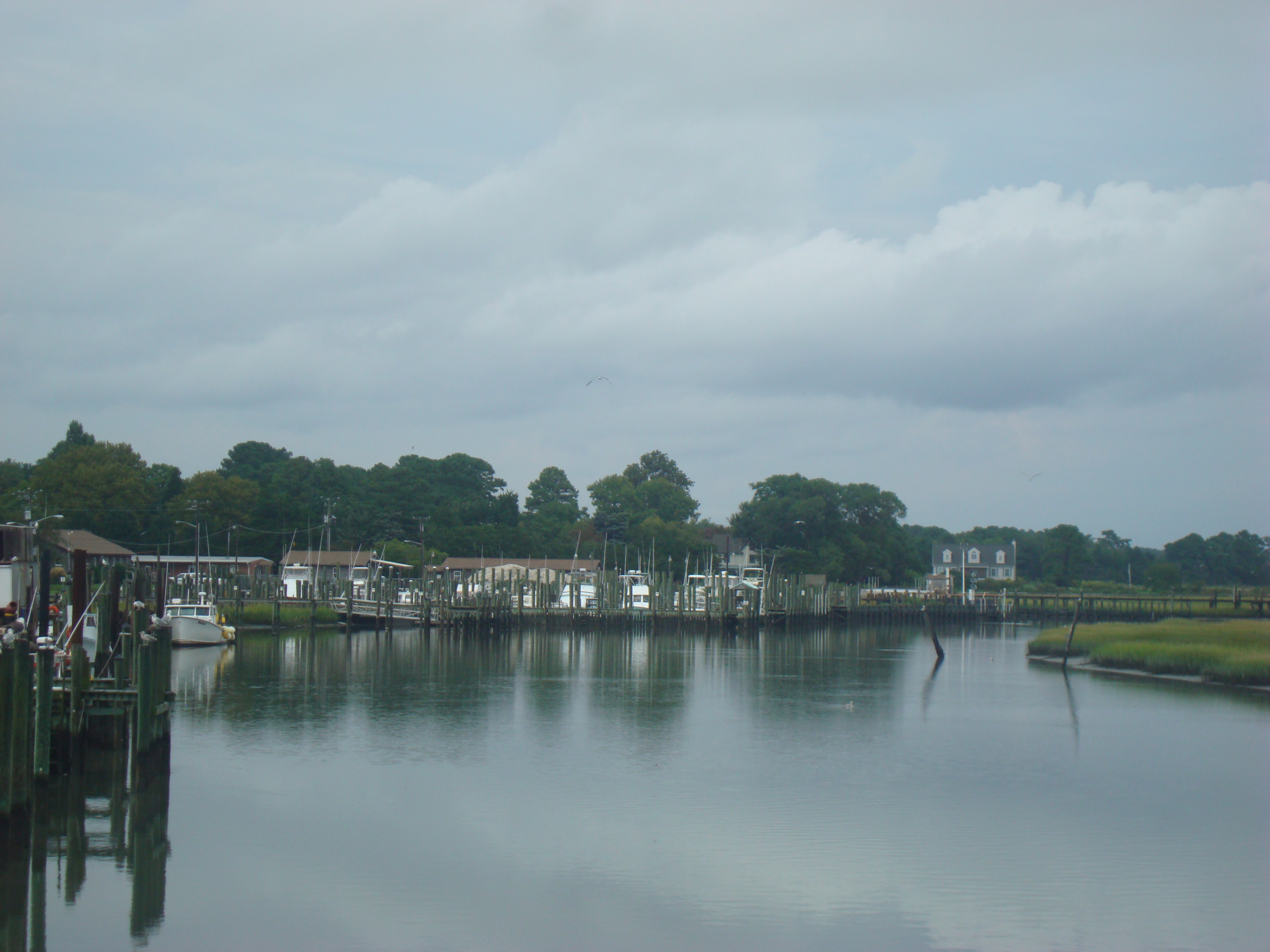
- Sea marsh and fishing boats in Wachapreague

- Location in Accomack County and the state of Virginia.
- Coordinates: 37°36′23″N 75°41′26″W
- Country: United States
- State: Virginia
- County: Accomack

Area
  - Total: 0.22 sq mi (0.58 km^{2})
  - Land: 0.22 sq mi (0.58 km^{2})
  - Water: 0 sq mi (0.00 km^{2})
- Elevation: 7 ft (2.1 m)

Population (2020)
  - Total: 257
  - Density: 998.6/sq mi (385.55/km^{2})
- Time zone: UTC−5 (Eastern (EST))
  - Summer (DST): UTC−4 (EDT)
- ZIP code: 23480
- Area codes: 757, 948
- FIPS code: 51-82320
- GNIS feature ID: 1500265
- Website: www.wachapreague.org

Wachapreague is a town in Accomack County, Virginia, United States. The population was 257 at the 2020 census.

== History ==
The name of the town came from the Wachapreague, an Algonquian people who resided in the area centuries ago.

Bunting Place was added to the National Register of Historic Places in 2003.

== Geography ==
According to the United States Census Bureau, the town has a total area of 0.3 square mile (0.7 km^{2}), all land.

The Wachapreague Channel winds from the town, through the seaside marsh, out to the barrier islands. Between Cedar and Parramore Islands it reaches the Atlantic Ocean. Easy access to the marsh and ocean makes this a popular place for fishermen.

== Demographics ==
Historical population
Census	Pop.	Note	%±
1910	485		—
1920	498		2.7%
1930	585		17.5%
1940	548		−6.3%
1950	551		0.5%
1960	507		−8.0%
1970	399		−21.3%
1980	404		1.3%
1990	291		−28.0%
2000	236		−18.9%
2010	232		−1.7%
2020	257		10.8%
U.S. Decennial Census

At the 2000 census there were 236 people, 133 households, and 69 families living in the town. The population density was 922.9 people per square mile (356.3 people/km^{2}). There were 225 housing units at an average density of 879.9 units per square mile (339.7 units/km^{2}). The racial makeup of the town was 93.22% White, 2.54% African American, 0.42% Native American, 1.69% from other races, and 2.12% from two or more races. Hispanic or Latino of any race were 1.69%.

Of the 133 households 9.0% had children under the age of 18 living with them, 43.6% were married couples living together, 3.8% had a female householder with no husband present, and 48.1% were non-families. 42.9% of households were one person and 25.6% were one person aged 65 or older. The average household size was 1.77 and the average family size was 2.32.

The age distribution was 7.6% under the age of 18, 3.8% from 18 to 24, 20.3% from 25 to 44, 33.1% from 45 to 64, and 35.2% 65 or older. The median age was 56 years. For every 100 females, there were 87.3 males. For every 100 females aged 18 and over, there were 83.2 males.

The median household income was $36,625 and the median family income was $39,063. Males had a median income of $30,313 versus $21,563 for females. The per capita income for the town was $21,680. About 2.9% of families and 7.7% of the population were below the poverty line, including none of those under the age of eighteen and 7.0% of those sixty-five or over.

== Notable people ==
- G. Walter Mapp, member of the Virginia Senate
- A. Thomas Young, NASA director and aerospace executive
