= Pungoteague, Virginia =

Populated place in Virginia, US

- Census-designated place
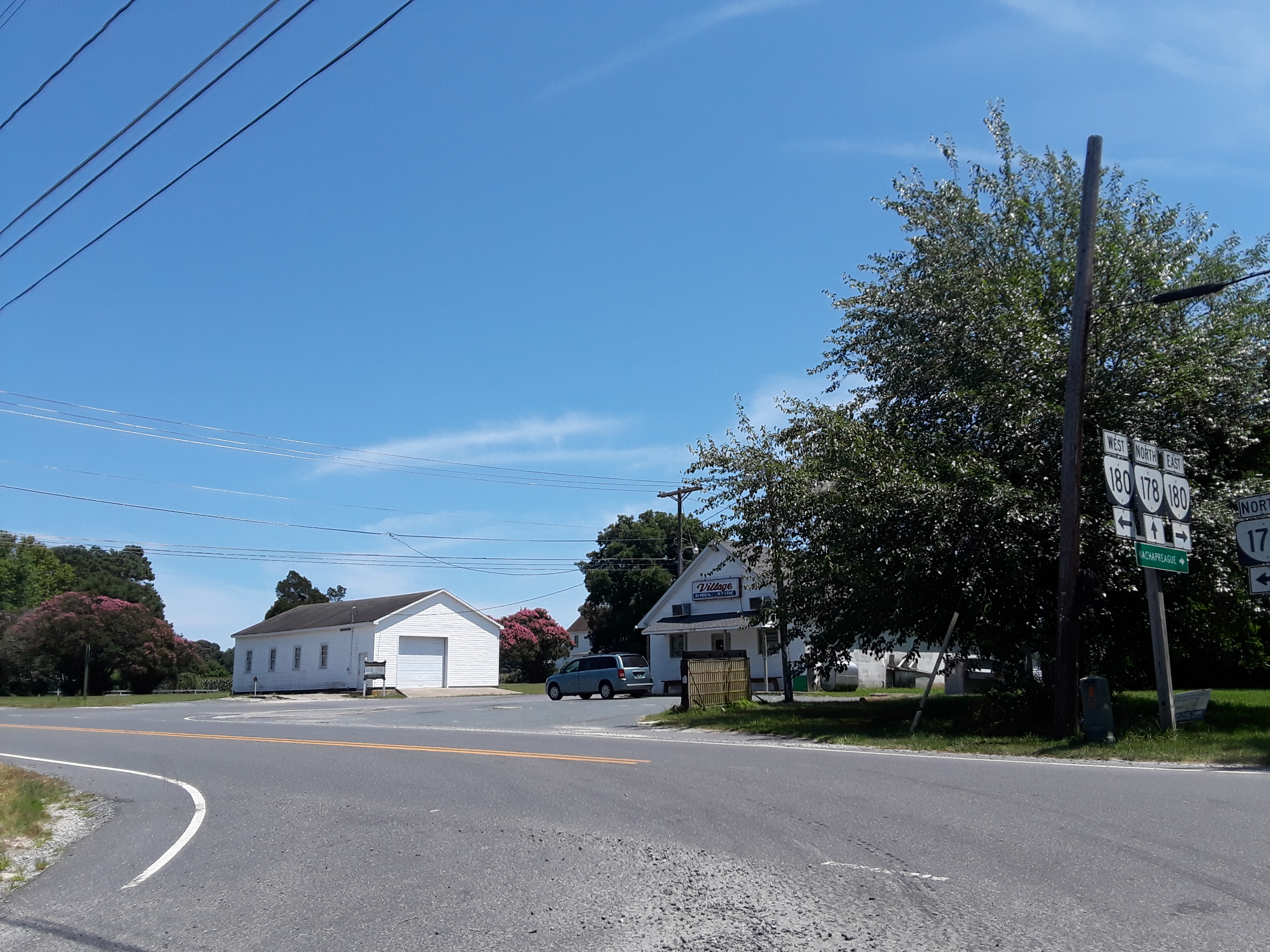
- Village General Store in Pungoteague, July 2018

- Location in Accomack County and the state of Virginia.
- Coordinates: 37°37′44″N 75°49′2″W
- Country: United States
- State: Virginia
- County: Accomack
- Elevation: 26 ft (7.9 m)

Population (2010)
  - Total: 347
- Time zone: UTC−5 (Eastern (EST))
  - Summer (DST): UTC−4 (EDT)
- FIPS code: 51-48776
- GNIS feature ID: 2584905

Pungoteague is a census-designated place (CDP) in Accomack County, Virginia, United States. It was first listed as a CDP in 2010. Per the 2020 census, the population was 346.

The name itself is a derivative of the Native American term "Pungotekw," which means Sand Fly River and is the name used by the earliest inhabitants.

In late summer of 1665, William Darby and two of his friends dared present a play at Cowle's Tavern. Entitled Ye Bear and Ye Cub, this drama is believed to have been the first theater performance of an English-language play in the American colonies.

Another notable local landmark is Saint George's Church. It is believed that the first meetings of the Pungoteague Episcopal congregation were held in 1636, with the church's first building being constructed from 1666 to 1676. The original frame church was replaced in 1736 by a brick structure in the Flemish bond pattern. It was added to the National Register of Historic Places in 1970. Shepherd's Plain was added in 1982.

In the mid-19th century, Pungoteague was a point along the stagecoach route between Wilmington, Delaware and Eastville, Virginia.

== Geography ==
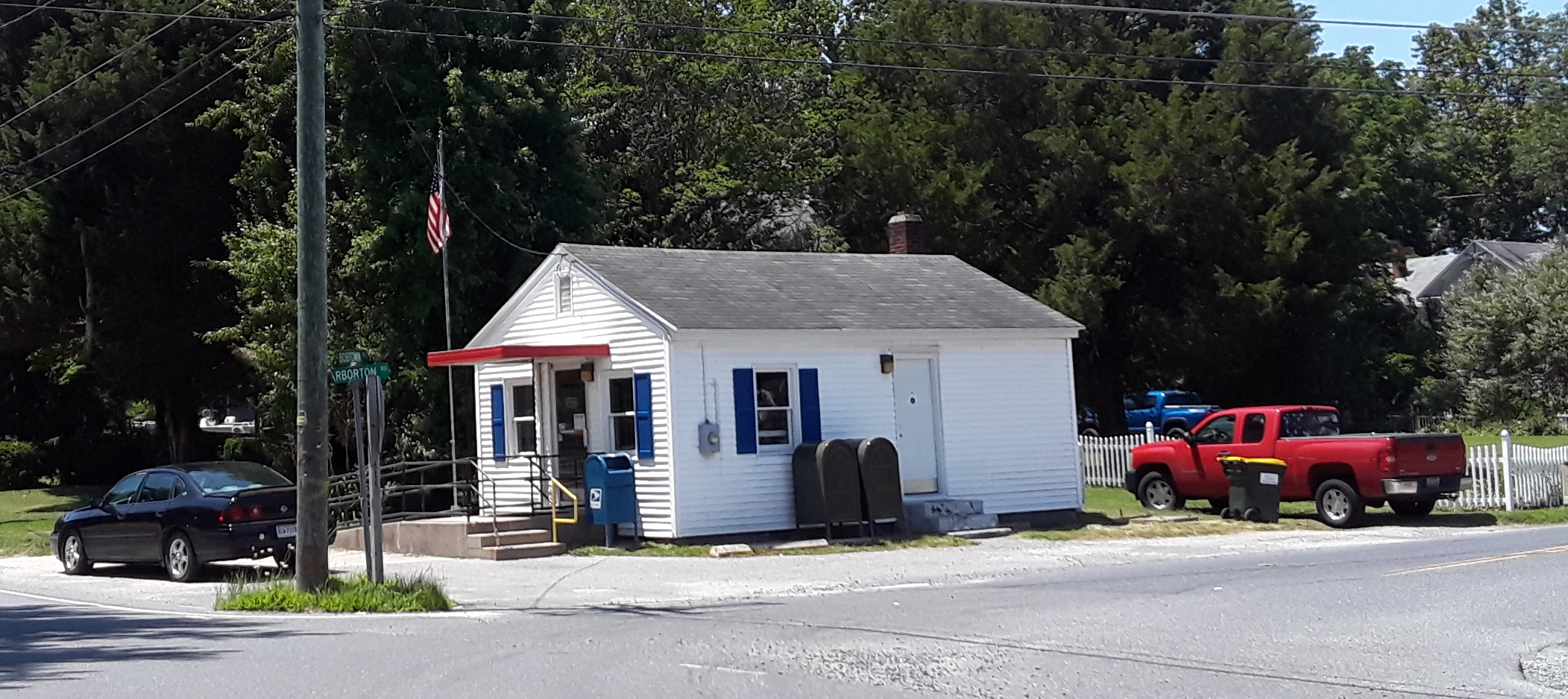
Pungoteague post office, July 2018

The CDP lies at an elevation of 26 feet.

== Demographics ==
Historical population
Census	Pop.	Note	%±
2010	347		—
2020	346		−0.3%
U.S. Decennial Census; 2010 2020

Pungoteague was first listed as a census designated place in the 2010 U.S. census.

=== 2020 census ===
Pungoteague CDP, Virginia – Racial and ethnic composition Note: the US Census treats Hispanic/Latino as an ethnic category. This table excludes Latinos from the racial categories and assigns them to a separate category. Hispanics/Latinos may be of any race.
Race / Ethnicity (NH = Non-Hispanic)	Pop 2010	Pop 2020	% 2010	% 2020
White alone (NH)	215	221	61.96%	63.87%
Black or African American alone (NH)	117	74	33.72%	21.39%
Native American or Alaska Native alone (NH)	5	1	1.44%	0.29%
Asian alone (NH)	0	4	0.00%	1.16%
Pacific Islander alone (NH)	0	0	0.00%	0.00%
Some Other Race alone (NH)	0	1	0.00%	0.29%
Mixed Race or Multi-Racial (NH)	3	18	0.86%	5.20%
Hispanic or Latino (any race)	7	27	2.02%	7.80%
Total	347	346	100.00%	100.00%
