= Virginia State Route 182 =

State highway in Accomack County, Virginia, US

State Route 182

Route information
- Maintained by VDOT
- Length: 3.71 mi (5.97 km)
- Existed: 1933–present

Major junctions
- West end: US 13 / SR 614 in Painter
- East end: SR 605 at Quinby

Location
- Country: United States
- State: Virginia
- Counties: Accomack

Highway system
- Virginia Routes; Interstate; US; Primary; Secondary; Byways; History; HOT lanes
← SR 181	→ SR 183

State Route 182 (SR 182) is a primary state highway in the U.S. state of Virginia. The state highway runs 3.71 miles (5.97 km) from U.S. Route 13 (US 13) in Painter east to SR 605 at Quinby in southern Accomack County.

== Route description ==
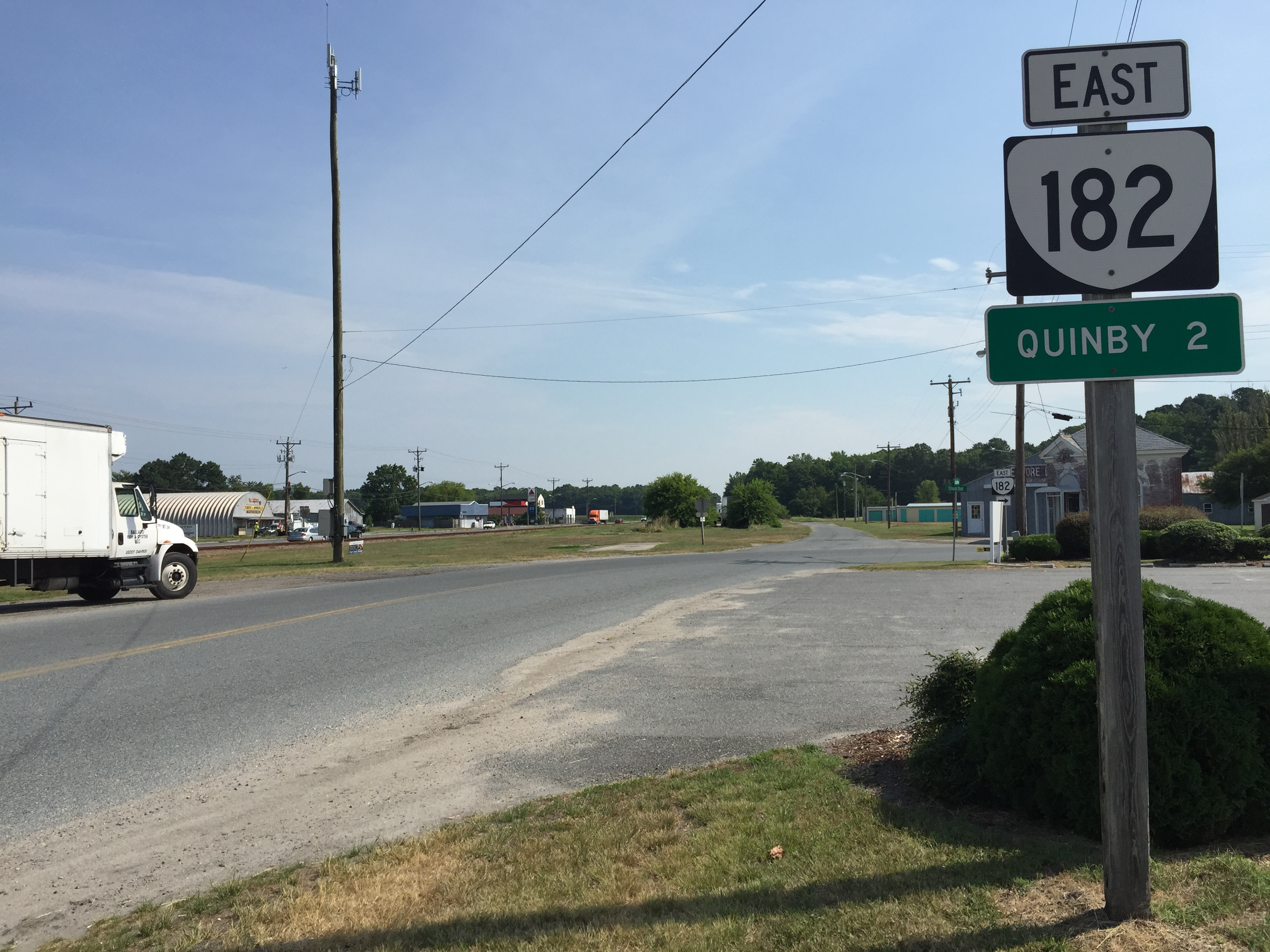
View east along SR 182 at US 13 and SR 614 in Painter

SR 182 begins at an intersection with US 13 (Lankford Highway) in the town of Painter. The state highway follows two-lane undivided Main Street very briefly east of US 13, during which the highway intersects an inactive railroad line. East of the inactive rail line, SR 182 turns north onto Railroad Avenue, then veers east onto Edmunds Street. The state highway leaves town along Mappsburg Road, which the highway follows to the hamlet of Mappsburg. SR 182 continues east as Quinby Bridge Road, which crosses the Machipongo River on the namesake bridge. The state highway reaches its eastern terminus at SR 605, which heads north as Bradfords Neck Road and south as Upshur Neck Road through the village of Quinby on Upshur Bay.

== Major intersections ==
The entire route is in Accomack County.

Location	mi	km	Destinations	Notes
Painter	0.00	0.00	US 13 (Lankford Highway) / SR 614 west (Wayside Drive) – Accomac, Eastville	Western terminus
Quinby	3.71	5.97	SR 605 (Bradford Neck Road)	Eastern terminus
1.000 mi = 1.609 km; 1.000 km = 0.621 mi

< SR 529	District 5 State Routes; 1928–1933	SR 531 >
