= 2004 Christmas Eve United States winter storm =

Weather event in the United States

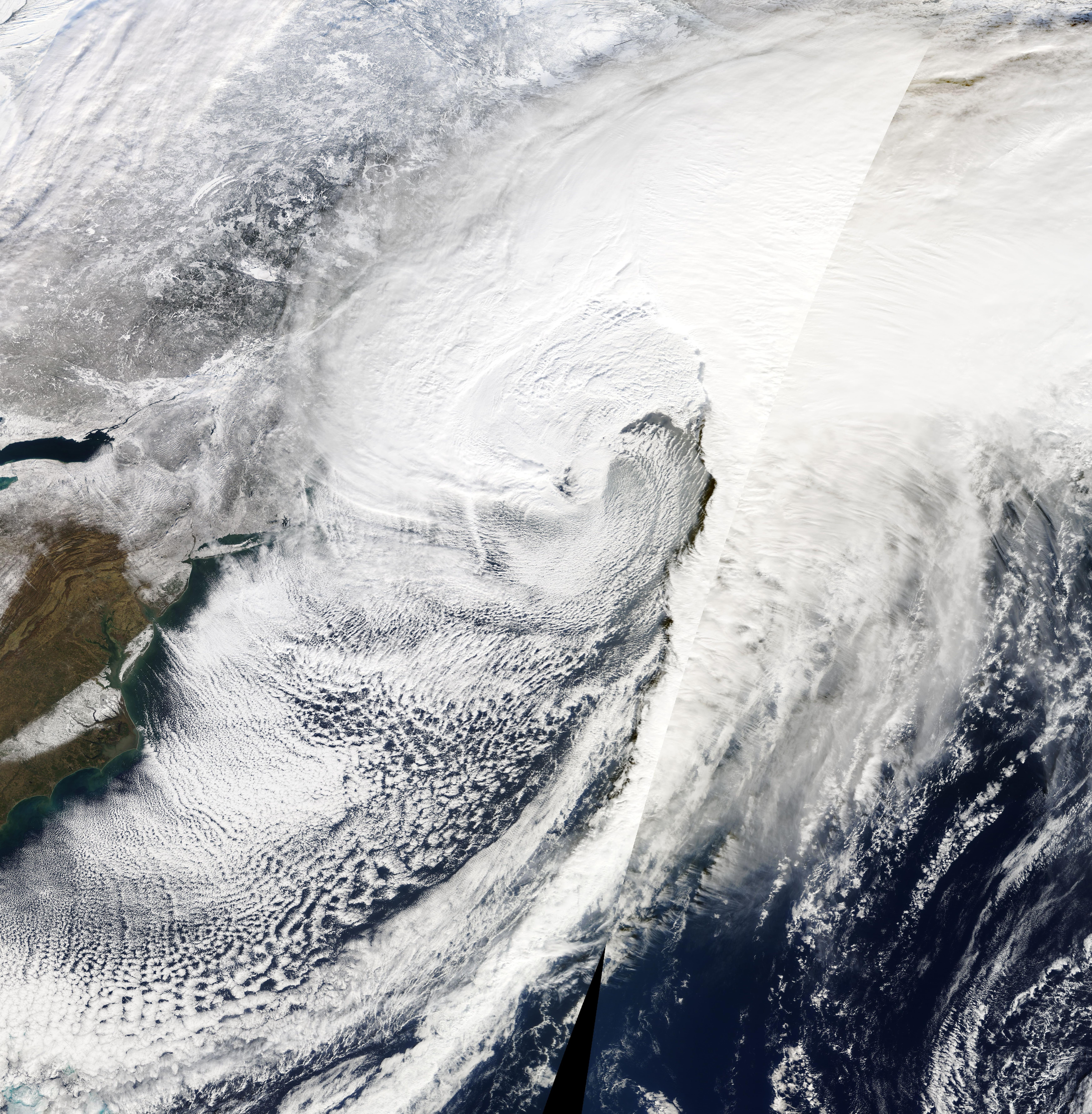
- The nor'easter at peak intensity offshore of Atlantic Canada, on the morning of December 27

Meteorological history
- Formed: December 24, 2004
- Dissipated: December 28, 2004

Extratropical cyclone
- Lowest pressure: 964 hPa (mbar); 28.47 inHg
- Max. snowfall: 18 inches (45.7 cm)

Overall effects
- Areas affected: South Central United States, East Coast of the United States
- Part of the 2004–05 North American winter

The 2004 Christmas Eve United States winter storm was a rare weather event that took place in Louisiana and Texas in the United States on December 24, 2004, before the storm moved northeast to affect the coastal sections of the Mid-Atlantic states and New England in the succeeding few days. This was a different storm from the historic event that struck the Midwest and southern Canada around December 23 from another cyclone which preceded this storm. The event involved a thin band of snowfall with unusually cold temperatures for the middle Texas coast, and caused dozens of varied weather records to be shattered. It was the most significant snow for the Texas Gulf Coast, and deep South Texas, since February 1895.

== Anticipation of the event ==
There had been indications for up to a week before the event that a frontal wave in the Gulf of Mexico was expected to track far enough to the south (along roughly the 26th parallel) to lead to snow along the Gulf of Mexico coastline of the United States.

== Synoptic history ==
A surface cyclone formed in the western Gulf of Mexico on December 24 due to a shortwave aloft, and moved eastward through the western Gulf of Mexico, bringing banded snowfall to the middle Texas coast. The extratropical cyclone moved east, then northeast, tracking across the northern peninsula of Florida early on December 26 before moving about 100 miles (200 km) offshore the Southeast, paralleling the coast. Continuing to deepen, the developing storm moved about 200 miles (300 km) offshore the Mid-Atlantic states, New England, and Atlantic Canada on December 27 before moving out to sea.

== Effects ==
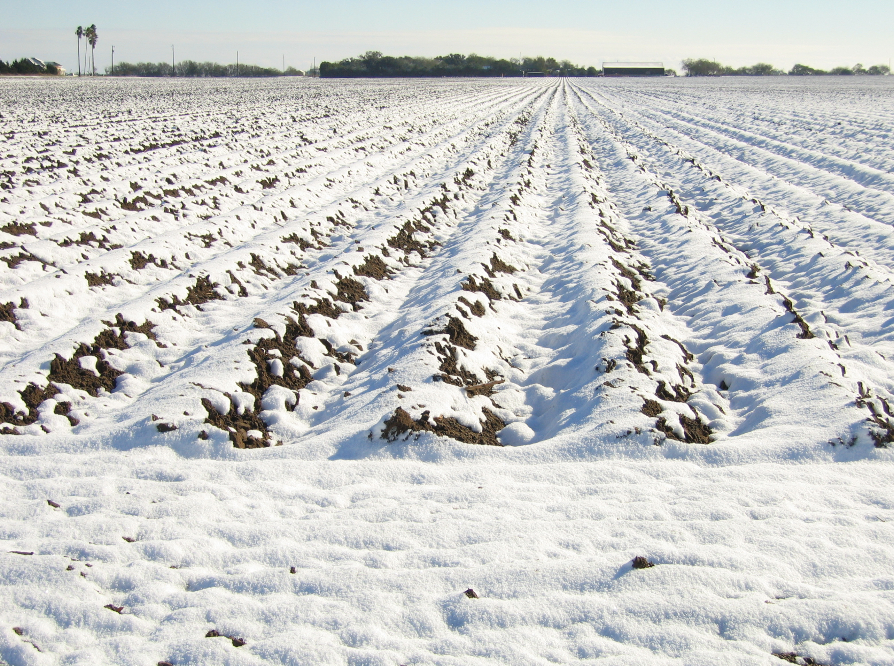
Christmas Day in Deep South Texas

=== Texas and Louisiana ===
The most noticeable, and unusual, event associated with the storm was the snowfall it produced. Much of the snow fell in southern Texas, along the coast of the Gulf of Mexico, but some snow, albeit less deep, fell across southern Louisiana. Any snowfall in these areas is extremely unusual, perhaps occurring once every twenty years, and these events are usually airborne flurries which melt on contact with the ground. In many places the snow stuck to the ground and accumulated to an appreciable depth. In Brownsville, Texas, snow fell to a depth of 1.5 inches (3.8 cm), the first measurable snowfall at the city in over 100 years, since the Great Blizzard of 1899.

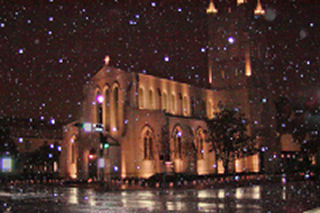
Trinity Church in Houston Christmas Eve 2004

The fact that the snow accumulated overnight on Christmas Eve led to a White Christmas the next morning, something completely foreign to the region. Across all of southern Texas and in southwestern Louisiana, snow fell in places where it had not for anywhere from 15 to 120 years. Near the coast, in Corpus Christi, Texas, 5.2 inches (13 cm) of snow fell, more snow than in all previous recorded years combined. This was also the case in Victoria, Texas, where a significant 13.0 inches (33 cm) fell. New Orleans, Louisiana had its first white Christmas in 50 years. In addition to the unusual occurrence of snow inland, moderate to heavy snow was also reported over the open waters of the Gulf of Mexico. This is the first significant snow fall in Houston since February 12, 1960, when a snowstorm hit central and south Texas with eight to 10 inches of snow.

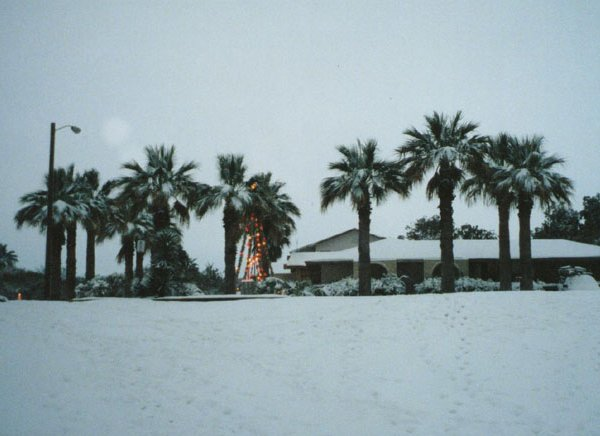
An unusual sight: palm trees covered in snow in Portland, Texas

Some snow totals:

- Alice, Texas: 12 inches (30.48 cm)
- Beeville, Texas: 10.0 inches (25.4 cm)
- Brownsville, Texas: 1.5 inches (3.8 cm)
- Corpus Christi, Texas: 5.2 inches (13.2 cm)
- El Campo, Texas: 11.0 inches (27.9 cm)
- Galveston, Texas: 4.0 inches (10.16 cm)
- Houston, Texas: 1.0 inches (2.5 cm)
- Kingsville, Texas: 6.0 inches (15.24 cm)
- Lake Charles, Louisiana: 1.2 inches (3.1 cm)
- Laredo, Texas: 2.0 inches (5.07 cm)
- Mathis, Texas: 11 inches (27.9 cm)
- McAllen, Texas: 4.0 inches (10.16 cm)
- New Orleans, Louisiana: 0.7 inches or more (1.8 cm)
- Pearland, Texas: 2.8 inches (7.3 cm)
- Sandia, Texas: 12 inches (30.48 cm)
- Victoria, Texas: 13.0 inches (33.0 cm)

=== Georgia and South Carolina ===
As the cyclone tracked through Florida offshore the Southeast, up to an inch of freezing rain and sleet fell at Augusta and Aiken.

=== North Carolina ===
Several inches of snow fell across portions of the state, with the highest amount noted of 9.5 inches (24 cm) at Ahoskie.

=== Virginia ===
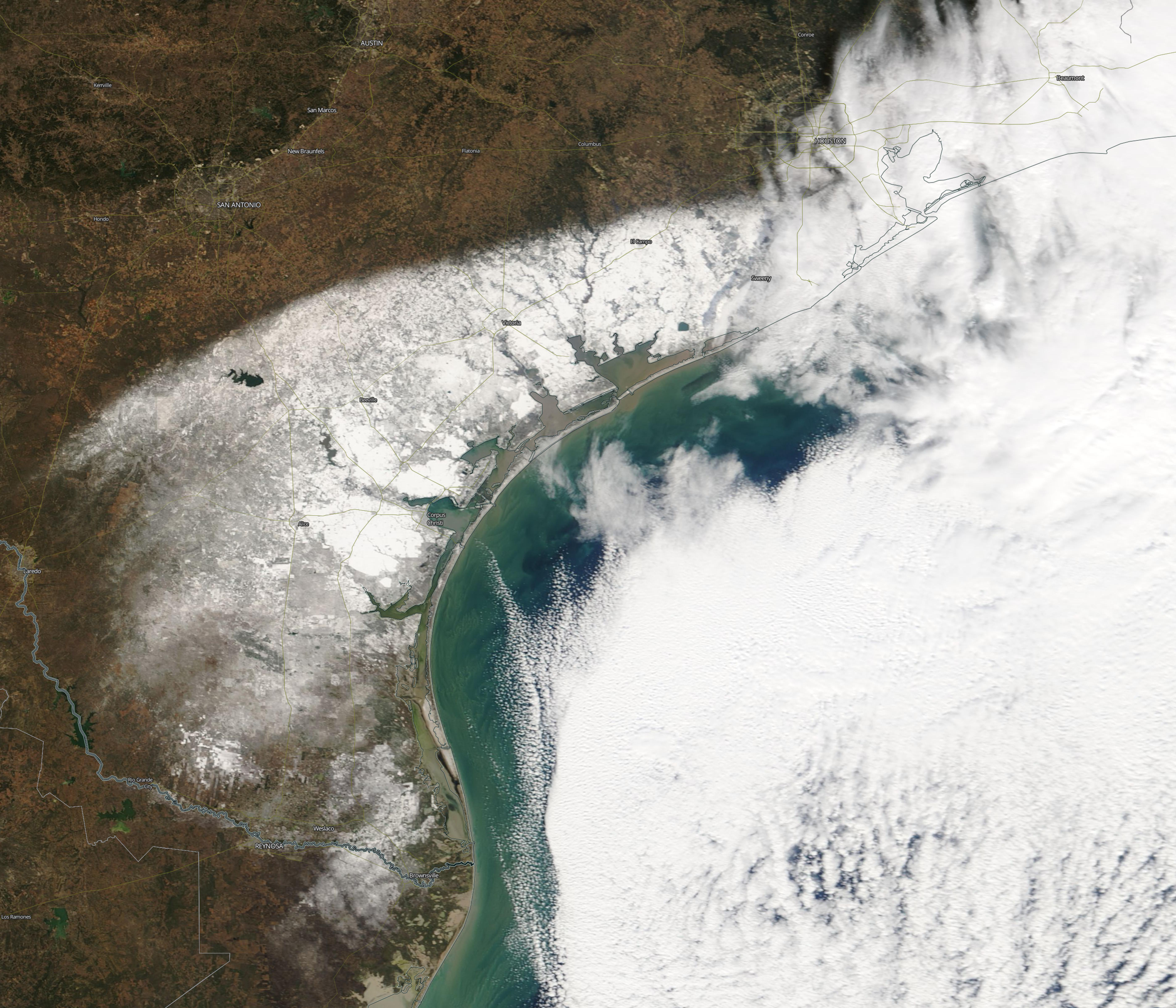
A satellite image of South Texas and northeastern Mexico on Christmas morning, showing the extent of the snowfall. (Click on the image and zoom in for place labels)

Several locations across the Tidewater reported over a foot of snow, with the highest amount of 14 inches (36 cm) reported at Quinby and Tabb. Frontogenesis (strengthening temperature gradient) within the comma head of the extratropical cyclone between the 500 hPa and 700 hPa layers (or 10-20 kft) contributed to the banded snow seen across this region. It led to the snowiest December across the Norfolk area since 1958.

=== Maryland ===
Light to moderate snow fell on the Eastern Shore, with the highest amount of 4.5 inches (11 cm) measured at Shelltown.

=== New Jersey ===
On December 25, 2004, there was light to moderate snowfall across portions of the state, with the highest amount of 2 inches (5.1 cm) falling at Mount Holly.

=== New York ===
Southeastern sections of the state saw the snowfall. The highest amount reported was 8.7 inches (22 cm) at East Hampton.

=== Connecticut ===
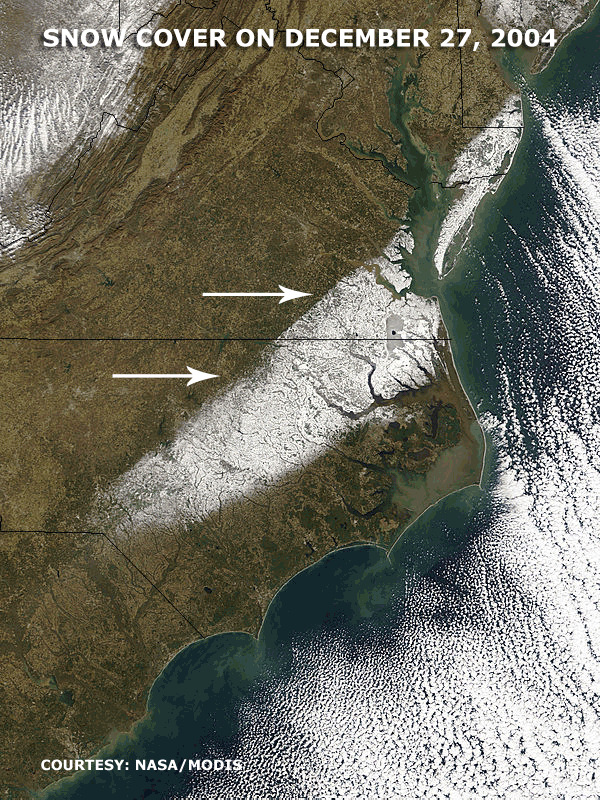
Imagery showing extent of snowfall across the Mid-Atlantic States

Moderate to heavy snow fell across much of the state. The highest total reported was 7 inches (18 cm) at East Killingly.

=== Rhode Island ===
Heavy snow fell statewide. The highest total was 8.2 inches (21 cm) at Tiverton.

=== Massachusetts ===
The heaviest snowfall from the storm fell across Massachusetts. Brewster measured 18 inches (46 cm) during the event.

=== New Hampshire ===
Central and southern sections of the state saw moderate to heavy snow. The highest amount was 9 inches (23 cm) at Salem.

=== Vermont ===
Snow fell across portions of the state during this storm, with 6 inches (15 cm) falling at a dairy farm in Franklin.

=== Maine ===
Heavy snow fell across portions of Maine. The highest amount reported was from Whiting where 13 inches (33 cm) was measured.

== See also ==
- Cyclogenesis
- Extratropical cyclone
- Pre-Christmas 2004 snowstorm that impacted the Midwest
- Snowstorm
- Surface weather analysis
