= White Christmas (weather) =

Christmas with the presence of snow, either on Christmas Eve or on Christmas Day

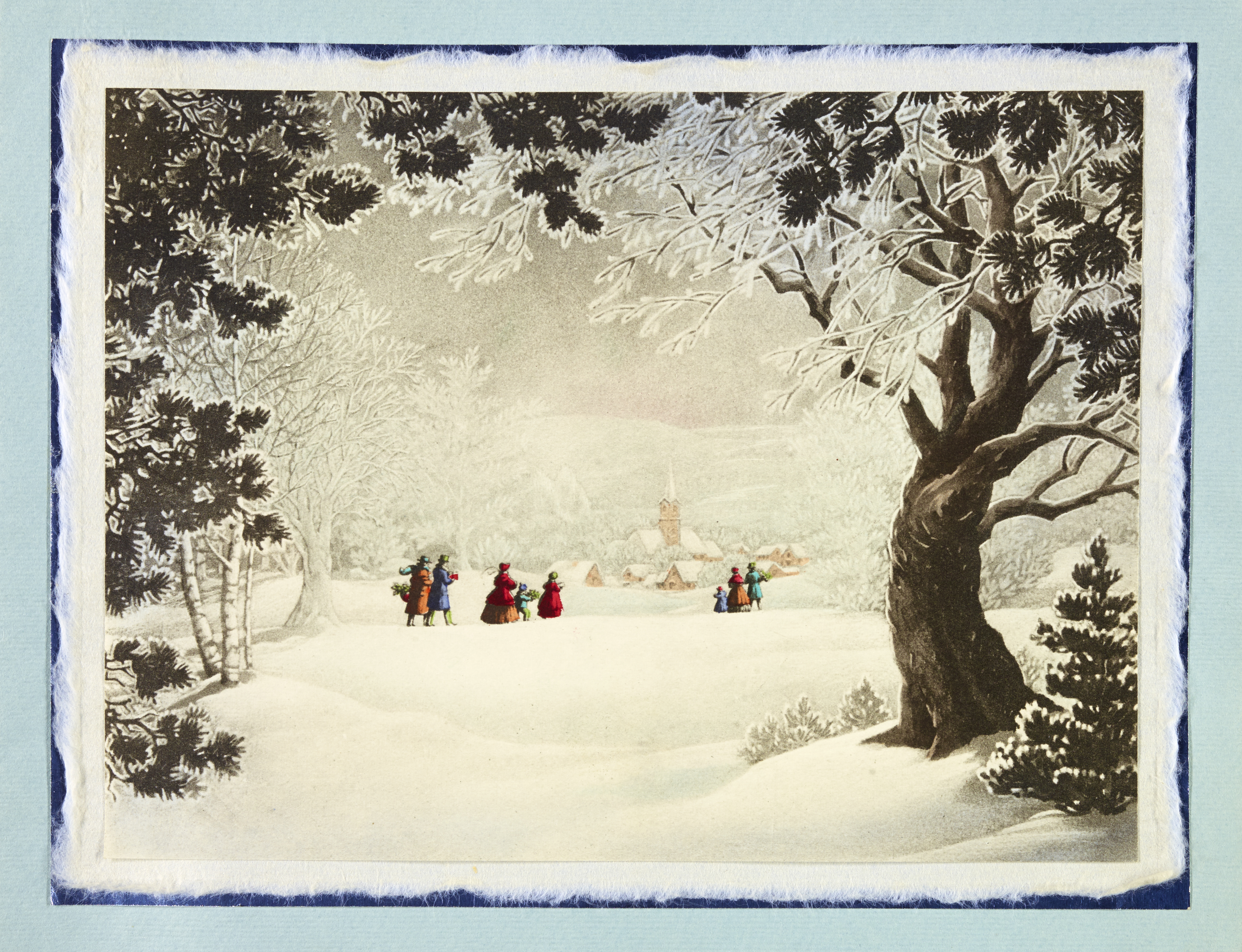
A British Christmas card from the 1950s depicting an ideal of a white Christmas

A white Christmas is a Christmas with the presence of snow, either on Christmas Eve or on Christmas Day, depending on local tradition. The phenomenon is most common in the northern countries of the Northern Hemisphere. This is because December is at the beginning of the Southern Hemisphere summer, and so white Christmases there are extremely rare—with the exception being Antarctica, the Southern Alps of New Zealand's South Island, and parts of the Andes in South America.

== History ==
The notion of "white Christmas" was popularized by writings of Charles Dickens. The depiction of snow-covered Christmas season found in The Pickwick Papers (1836), A Christmas Carol (1843), and his short stories was apparently influenced by memories of his childhood, which coincided with the coldest decade in England in more than a century.

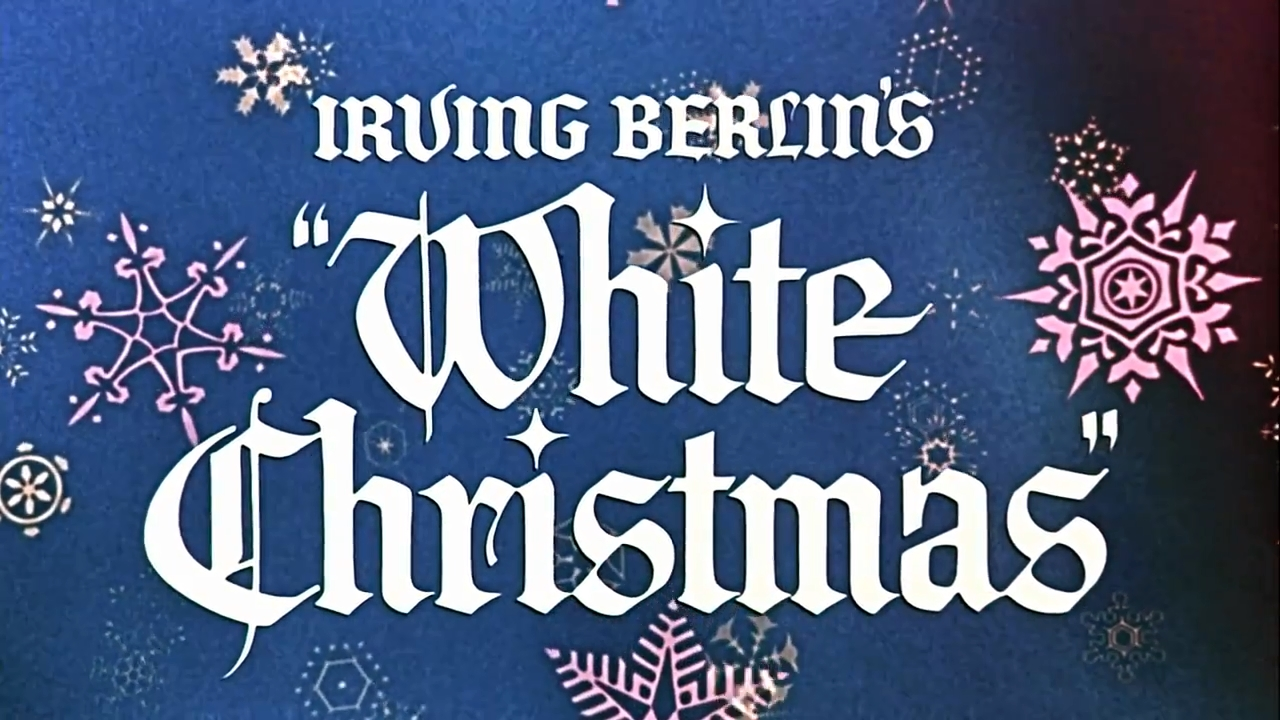
Title screenshot from the theatrical trailer for the film White Christmas (1954)

The song, "White Christmas", written by Irving Berlin and sung by Bing Crosby (with the Ken Darby singers and John Scott Trotter and his orchestra) and featured in the 1942 Paramount Pictures film Holiday Inn, is the best-selling single of all time and speaks nostalgically of a traditional white Christmas and has since become a seasonal standard.

== Definition ==
The criteria for a "white Christmas" varies. In most countries, it simply means that the ground is covered by snow at Christmas, but some countries have more strict definitions. In the United States, the official definition of a white Christmas is that there has to be a snow depth of at least 1 in or 2.5 cm on the ground on 25 December in the contiguous United States, and in Canada the official definition is that there has to be more than 2 cm (0.79 in) on the ground on Christmas Day. In the United Kingdom, although for many a white Christmas simply means a complete covering of snow on Christmas Day, the official definition by the British Met Office and British bookmakers is for snow to be observed falling, however little (even if it melts before it reaches the ground), in the 24 hours of 25 December. Consequently, according to the Met Office and British bookmakers, even 91 cm (3 ft) of snow on the ground at Christmas, because of a heavy snow fall a few days before, will not constitute a white Christmas, but a few snowflakes mixed with rain will, even if they never reach the ground. In the United Kingdom the most likely place to see snowfall on a Christmas Day is in North and North Eastern Scotland, in Aberdeen, Aberdeenshire or the Highlands.

== By country ==
=== Croatia ===
In recent decades, white Christmases in Zagreb have been observed in 1996, 1998, 1999, 2001 and – most recently, as of 2018 – in 2007. The probability of white Christmas in Zagreb has been estimated at 25%.

In continental Croatia, the estimated probability of white Christmas is highest in Gorski Kotar and Lika (50-70%), followed by northwestern Croatia (40-60%) and Slavonia (20-40%). Climate projections suggest white Christmases in Croatia might become rarer in the future.

=== Ireland ===
In Ireland, the prospect of early winter snow is always remote due to the country's mild and wet climate (snowfall is most common in January and February). Bookmakers offer odds every year for a white Christmas, which is officially lying snow being recorded at 09:00 local time on Christmas Day, and recorded at either Dublin Airport or Cork Airport (bets are offered for each airport).

Since 1961, countrywide, snow has fallen on 17 Christmas Days (1961, 1962, 1964, 1966, 1970, 1980, 1984, 1990, 1993, 1995, 1998, 1999, 2000, 2001, 2004, 2009 and 2010), with nine of these having snow lying on the ground at 09:00 (1964, 1970, 1980, 1993, 1995, 1999, 2004, 2009 and 2010). The maximum amount of lying snow ever recorded on Christmas Day was 27 cm (11 in) at Casement Aerodrome in 2010.

At Dublin Airport, there have been 12 Christmas Days with snowfall since 1941 (1950, 1956, 1962, 1964, 1970, 1984, 1990, 1993, 1995, 1999, 2000 and 2004). The statistical likelihood of snow falling on Christmas Day at Dublin Airport is approximately once every 5.9 years. However, the only Christmas Day at the airport ever to have lying snow at 09:00 was 2010 (although no snow actually fell that day), with 20 cm (7.9 in) recorded.

=== North America ===
==== Canada ====
In most parts of Canada it is likely to have a white Christmas in most years, except for the coast and southern interior valleys of British Columbia, southern Alberta, southern Ontario, and parts of Atlantic Canada – in those places Christmas without snow is not uncommon in warmer years, with the British Columbia coast the least likely place to have a white Christmas. The definition of a white Christmas in Canada is 2 cm (0.79 in) of snow-cover or more on Christmas morning at 7 am. Environment Canada started to analyze data from 1955 to 2017 for a total of 63 years, It shows the chance of a White Christmas for several Canadian cities.

The year 2006 saw some of the warmest weather on record, with such places as Quebec City experiencing their first green Christmas in recorded history. In 2008, Canada experienced the first nationwide white Christmas in 37 years, as a series of pre-Christmas storms hit the nation, including the normally rainy BC Pacific coast. In 2015, the weather was mild in the east, with record-setting warm temperatures in Toronto and southern Ontario which made 2015 a green Christmas while the west saw cold and snowy weather.

==== United States ====
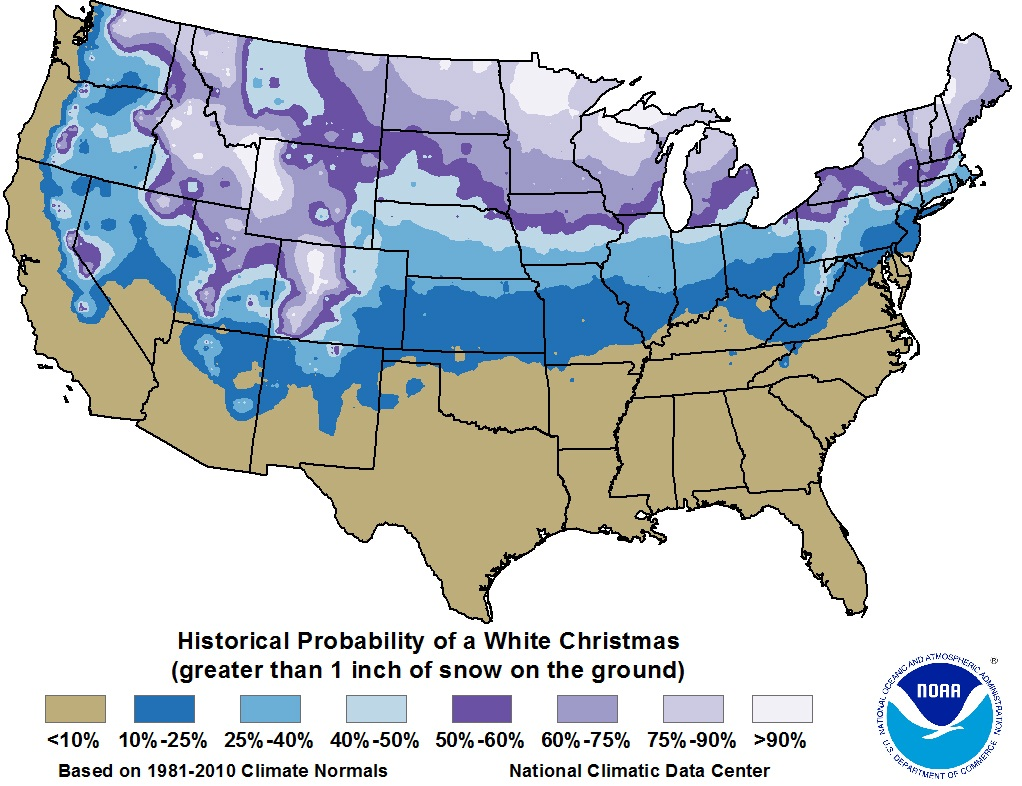
Probability of a white Christmas in the contiguous United States from 1981 to 2010

In the United States, there is often—but not always—snow on the ground at Christmas in the northern states, except in the Pacific Northwest, with Alaska the most likely to see snow on the ground at Christmas. In the contiguous United States, the highest probabilities are in the Upper Midwest and parts of northern New England, along with higher elevations of the Rockies. Some of the least likely white Christmases that have happened include the 2004 Christmas Eve Snowstorm, which brought the first white Christmas in 50 years to New Orleans. The 2004 storm also brought the first measurable snow of any kind since 1895 to Brownsville, Texas, and its twin city of Matamoros, Mexico. The Florida winter storm of 1989 also occurred immediately before Christmas causing a white Christmas for cities like Pensacola and Jacksonville. The same storm buried Wilmington, North Carolina and the rest of southeastern North Carolina under 38 cm (15 in) of snow.

In the United States the notion of a white Christmas is often associated in the American popular consciousness with a Christmas celebration that includes traditional observances in the company of friends and family. "White Christmas" is an Irving Berlin song reminiscing about an old-fashioned Christmas setting.

According to research by the CDIAC, the United States during the second half of the 20th century experienced declining frequencies of white Christmases, especially in the northeastern region. The National Climatic Data Center based the probability of a white Christmas (1 in or 2.5 cm of snow on the ground) at selected cities upon the 1981–2010 numbers from stations with at least 25 years of data.

==== Tables for North America ====
Canada
City	Province	Probability (%)
Brandon	Manitoba	94
Calgary	Alberta	59
Charlottetown	Prince Edward Island	78
Edmonton	Alberta	87
Fredericton	New Brunswick	76
Goose Bay	Newfoundland and Labrador	98
Grande Prairie	Alberta	86
Halifax	Nova Scotia	54
Hamilton	Ontario	62
Iqaluit	Nunavut	100
Kamloops	British Columbia	52
Kelowna	British Columbia	63
Kenora	Ontario	100
London	Ontario	68
Medicine Hat	Alberta	57
Moncton	New Brunswick	73
Montreal	Quebec	76
Ottawa	Ontario	81
Penticton	British Columbia	32
Prince George	British Columbia	92
Quebec City	Quebec	97
Regina	Saskatchewan	90
Saint John	New Brunswick	60
Sarnia	Ontario	59
Saskatoon	Saskatchewan	94
Stephenville	Newfoundland and Labrador	81
St. John's	Newfoundland and Labrador	65
Sudbury	Ontario	94
Thunder Bay	Ontario	97
Timmins	Ontario	98
Toronto	Ontario	46
Vancouver	British Columbia	10
Victoria	British Columbia	11
Whitehorse	Yukon	100
Wiarton	Ontario	81
Windsor	Ontario	46
Winnipeg	Manitoba	98
Yellowknife	Northwest Territories	100

United States
City	State	Probability (%)
Akron	Ohio	38
Albuquerque	New Mexico	4
Amarillo	Texas	11
Anchorage	Alaska	90
Annette Island	Alaska	15
Atlanta	Georgia	1
Boise	Idaho	28
Boston	Massachusetts	19
Casper	Wyoming	54
Charleston	South Carolina	1
Charleston	West Virginia	22
Charlotte	North Carolina	2
Chicago	Illinois	41
Cleveland	Ohio	43
Concord	New Hampshire	59
Dallas	Texas	1
Dayton	Ohio	22
Denver	Colorado	50
Des Moines	Iowa	45
Detroit	Michigan	37
Duluth	Minnesota	92
Fairbanks	Alaska	100
Fargo	North Dakota	78
Hartford	Connecticut	50
Helena	Montana	55
Honolulu	Hawaii	0
Huntington	West Virginia	15
Indianapolis	Indiana	26
Lexington	Kentucky	10
Little Rock	Arkansas	4
Los Angeles	California	0
Louisville	Kentucky	11
Marquette	Michigan	96
Massena	New York	67
Miami	Florida	0
Milwaukee	Wisconsin	47
Minneapolis	Minnesota	74
Nashville	Tennessee	2
Newark	New Jersey	13
New York City	New York	12
Oklahoma City	Oklahoma	8
Omaha	Nebraska	36
Philadelphia	Pennsylvania	8
Phoenix	Arizona	0
Pittsburgh	Pennsylvania	32
Portland	Maine	48
Portland	Oregon	4
Providence	Rhode Island	22
Rapid City	South Dakota	41
Reno	Nevada	21
Richmond	Virginia	6
Salt Lake City	Utah	52
San Francisco	California	0
Savannah	Georgia	1
Seattle	Washington	5
Spokane	Washington	57
St. Louis	Missouri	21
Topeka	Kansas	22
Washington, D.C.	Federal district	8
Wausau	Wisconsin	91
Wilmington	Delaware	10

=== Poland ===
The last white Christmas in Kraków was in 2010. Rzeszów had a white Christmas in 2016, the first since 2011.

=== Romania ===
White Christmases in Romania have been rare in recent times, At high altitudes, white Christmases are common.

Location	Probability
Bucharest	24%
Iași	39%
Timișoara	16%
Cluj Napoca	47%
Braşov	76%

=== United Kingdom ===
Location	Probability
London	9%
Birmingham	13%
Aberporth	8%
Glasgow	11%
Aberdeen	23%
Belfast	14%
Lerwick	38%
Bradford	14%
St Mawgan	10%

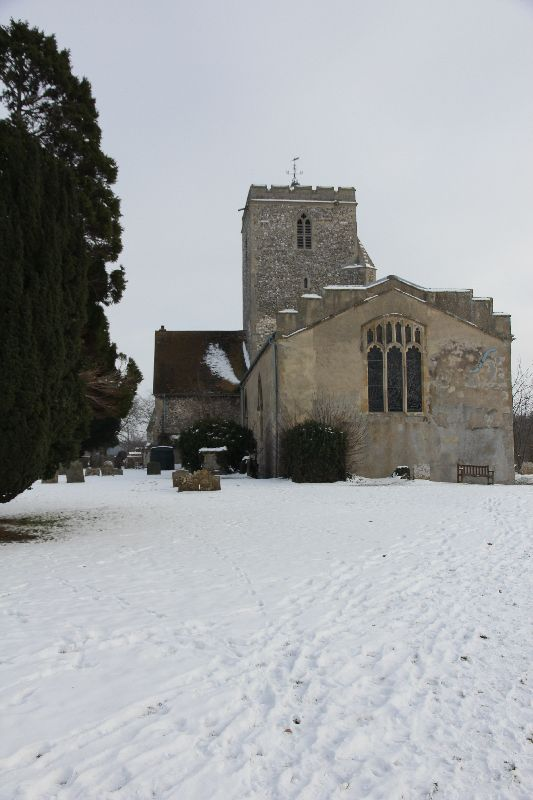
Christmas snow in Oxfordshire, England

In the United Kingdom, white Christmases were more common from the 1550s to the 1850s, during the Little Ice Age; the last frost fair on the River Thames, however, was in the winter of 1813–14. The shift from the Julian to the Gregorian calendar in 1752 also slightly reduced the chance of a white Christmas, by moving Christmas earlier in the winter.

Before 2006 for betting purposes, a Met Office employee was required to record if any snow fell on the London Weather Centre over the 24 hours of Christmas Day; after 2006 computers were used. An "official" white Christmas is defined by the Met Office as "one snowflake to be observed falling in the 24 hours of 25 December somewhere in the UK", but formerly the snow had to be observed at the Met Office building in London. By the newer measure, over half of all years have white Christmases, with snow being observed 38 times in the 54 years to 2015. A more "traditional" idea of snow-covered ground is less common, however, with only 4 occasions in the 51 years to 2015 reporting snow on the ground at 9am at more than 40% of weather stations.

Although most places in the UK do tend to see some snow in the winter, it generally falls in January and February. However white Christmases do occur, on average every 6 years.

Christmas 2009 was a white Christmas in some parts of Britain, with thick lying snow which easterly winds had brought over the previous week. Travel over much of Britain was badly affected by ice and snow on roads, and was made more slippery by partial daytime thaw followed by overnight refreezing. It was the first white Christmas anywhere in the United Kingdom since 2004. There was another white Christmas in 2010, it was also the coldest Christmas Day ever recorded in the United Kingdom. In 2014, parts of the Northern Isles had a white Christmas and again in 2017, Northern England and Southern Scotland had a white Christmas.

== Other parts of Europe ==
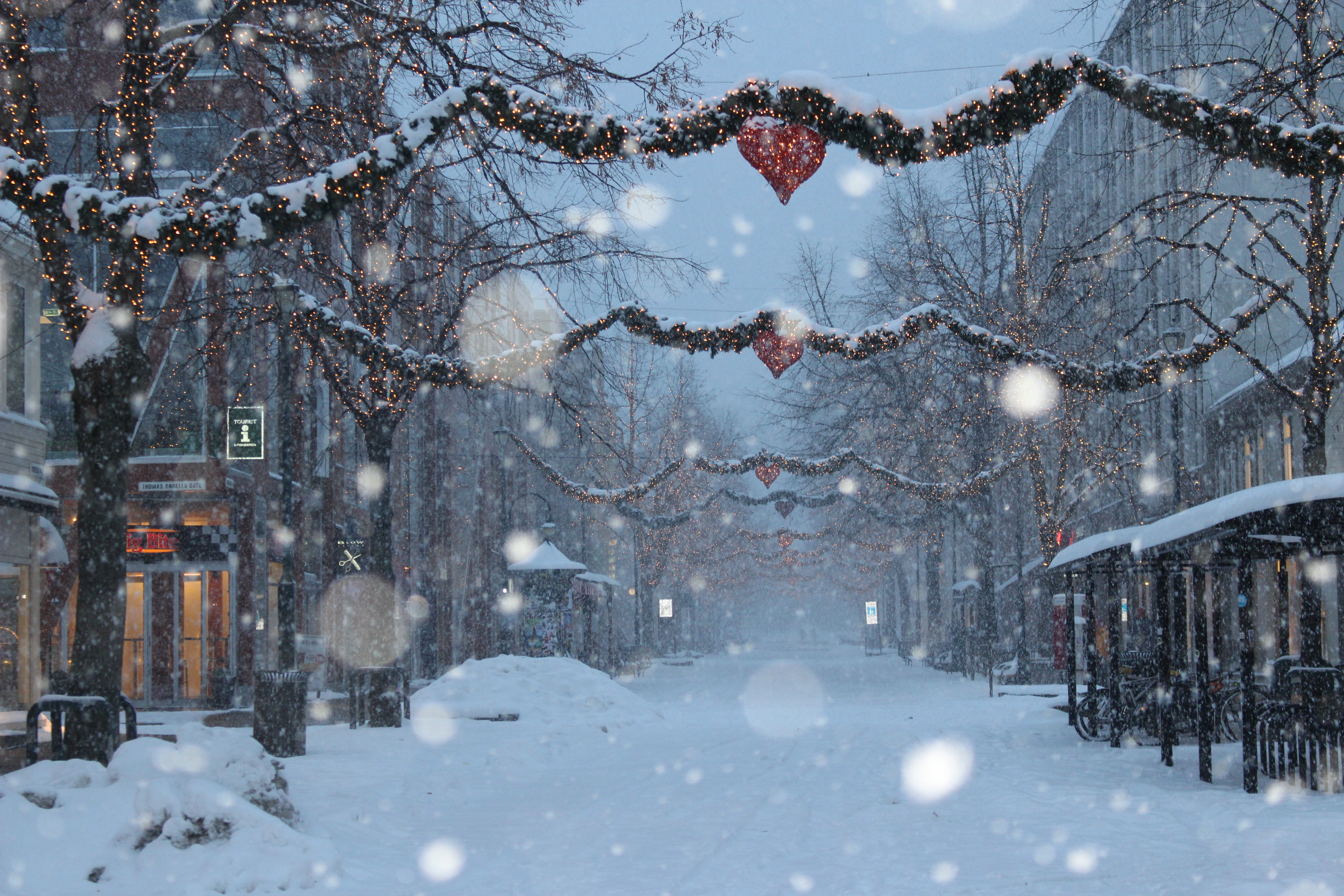
Christmas decorations surround Trondheim during a snowy day.

In Europe, snow at Christmas is common in Norway, Sweden, Finland, the Baltic states, Russia, Slovakia, Ukraine, Belarus, and northeastern Poland. In general, due to the influence of the warm Gulf Stream on European climate, chances of a white Christmas are lower farther west. For example, in southern France a white Christmas is rare, while in Bucharest, Romania, which is at a similar latitude, it is much more likely. Northern Italy and the mountain regions of central-south Italy may also have a white Christmas. In cities such as Turin, Milan or Bologna a Christmas with falling snow or snow on the ground is not a rarity. White Christmases are also common in the Carpathian Mountains, as well as the Alps.

== Southern Hemisphere ==
Because Christmas occurs during the summer in the Southern Hemisphere, white Christmases are especially rare events there, apart from Antarctica, which is generally uninhabited. A white Christmas elsewhere in the Southern Hemisphere is approximately equivalent to having snow in the Northern Hemisphere on 25 June. Some places like Ushuaia, Argentina and Stanley, Falkland Islands have received measurable snowfall on Christmas Day on numerous occasions.

In 2006, a snowstorm hit the Snowy Mountains in New South Wales and Victoria, Australia, arriving on Christmas morning and bringing nearly 12 in (30 cm) of snow in higher areas.

In New Zealand's Southern Alps, snow can fall any day of the year, and a white Christmas is possible. The same situation can be seen in the Andes at elevations above 4,000 m (13,000 ft), with some locations on the Bolivian altiplano, such as El Alto, having the theoretical possibility of a white Christmas.
