= December 21–24, 2004 North American winter storm =

Weather event in the United States and Canada

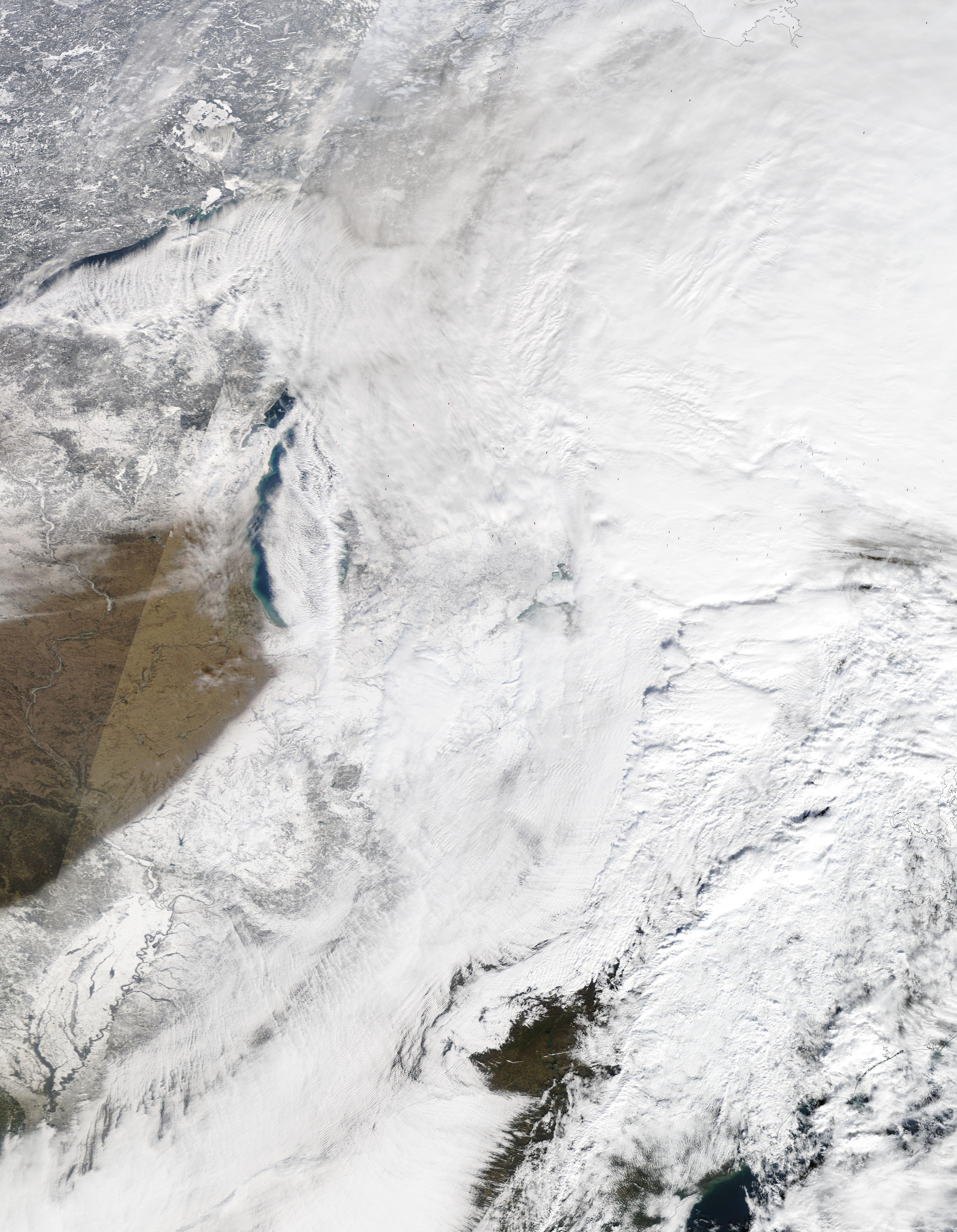
- A true-color satellite image of the storm near its most significant impact, taken on December 23, 2004

Meteorological history
- Formed: December 21, 2004
- Dissipated: December 24, 2004

Category 4 "Crippling" winter storm
- Regional snowfall index: 11.31 (NOAA)
- Lowest pressure: 984 mbar (hPa); 29.06 inHg
- Max. snowfall: 39 inches (99 cm) Medora, Indiana

Overall effects
- Fatalities: 18 (1 from Canada)
- Damage: $900 million (2004 USD)
- Areas affected: South Central United States, Ohio Valley, Eastern Canada

A historic snowstorm struck the Ohio Valley of the United States, as well as Ontario in Canada, on December 22 and 23 and is not the same storm that led to snow in Texas on Christmas Eve. It lasted roughly 30 hours, and brought snowfall amounts up to 29 inches (74 cm) to portions of the Midwestern United States. Damages from the storm totaled US$900 million (2004 dollars). A total of 18 died during the storm, one from Canada, mainly due to car accidents.

== Synoptic history ==
An arctic cold front moved through the Midwest, bringing cold air into the region and a brief 4-10 hour burst of snowfall on December 22. Thereafter, 3–6 hours of freezing rain and sleet fell. The second bout of wintry precipitation, which lasted about 13 hours, was caused by a surface cyclone in the southern stream of the Westerlies which moved northeast from the coastal bend of Texas early on December 22, moving across northern Louisiana, southeast Arkansas, northwest Mississippi, then across middle Tennessee, through western West Virginia early on December 23, eastern Ohio and Pennsylvania.

== Effects ==
Over 20 inches (51 cm) of snow fell across portions of southern Illinois and central Ohio. A band of freezing rain and sleet led to ice and sleet accumulations across western Tennessee, central Kentucky, as well as southern and eastern Ohio. Traffic was paralyzed across the region by plane, train, and automobile, during this winter storm. Interstate and state highways turned into parking lots as over 100,000 vehicle accidents were caused by the weather. Roofs of buildings caved in under the weight of the ice and snow, especially in areas which measured over 10 inches of snow. Almost a million residences saw power outages and numerous phone lines were downed. Four days of sub-freezing temperatures during and after the storm hampered recovery efforts. States of emergency were declared in Kentucky, Illinois, and Ohio.

=== United States ===
==== Arkansas ====
High winds and icing were the main impact in Arkansas. About 11,000 customers lost power for 2–3 days. Six died during the storm statewide.

==== Tennessee ====
About 23,000 customers were without power during the storm.

==== Kentucky ====
A snowfall record was set at Paducah, when 14 inches (36 cm) was measured. A major ice storm struck central portions of the state. After the storm, a record low was set on Christmas Day when the temperature fell to −8 °F (−22 °C) at Paducah. A total of 168,000 customers experienced power failure. Two died statewide.

==== Illinois ====
It was the most significant snowstorm on record for southern sections of the state. Snowfall records were set at Carbondale (12 inches (30 cm)), McLeansboro (14 inches (36 cm)), and Carmi (18 inches (46 cm)). Interstate 64 was blocked for three days.

==== Indiana ====
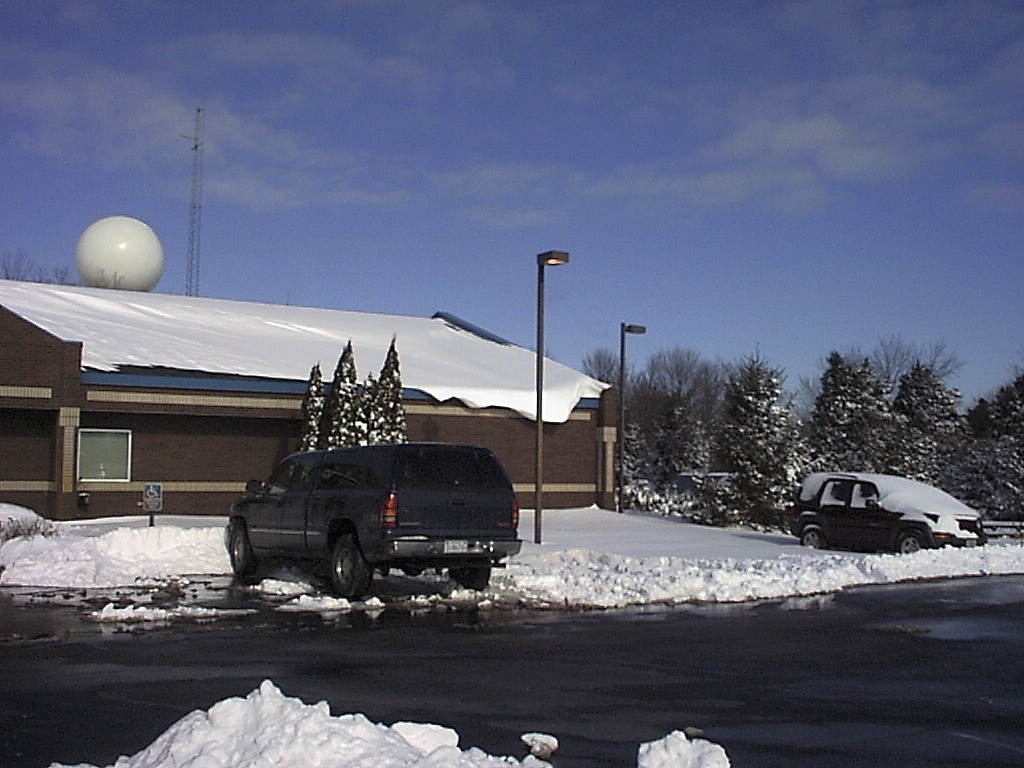
The scene at the National Weather Service Office in Indianapolis on the morning of December 23, 2004

Snowfall records were set in many locations across the Hoosier state. The records above 20 inches (51 cm) included Evansville (22.3 inches (57 cm)), Seymour (29 inches (74 cm)), North Vernon (26 inches (66 cm)), Brownstown (30 inches (76 cm)), Medora (39 inches (99 cm)), Crothersville (37 inches (94 cm)), and Greensburg (24 inches (61 cm)). After the storm, a record low was set at Evansville on Christmas Day when the temperature fell to −11 °F (−24 °C). This combination of factors closed Interstate 64 for three days and Interstate 94 for over two days (reopening Christmas Eve). Five died statewide.

==== Ohio ====
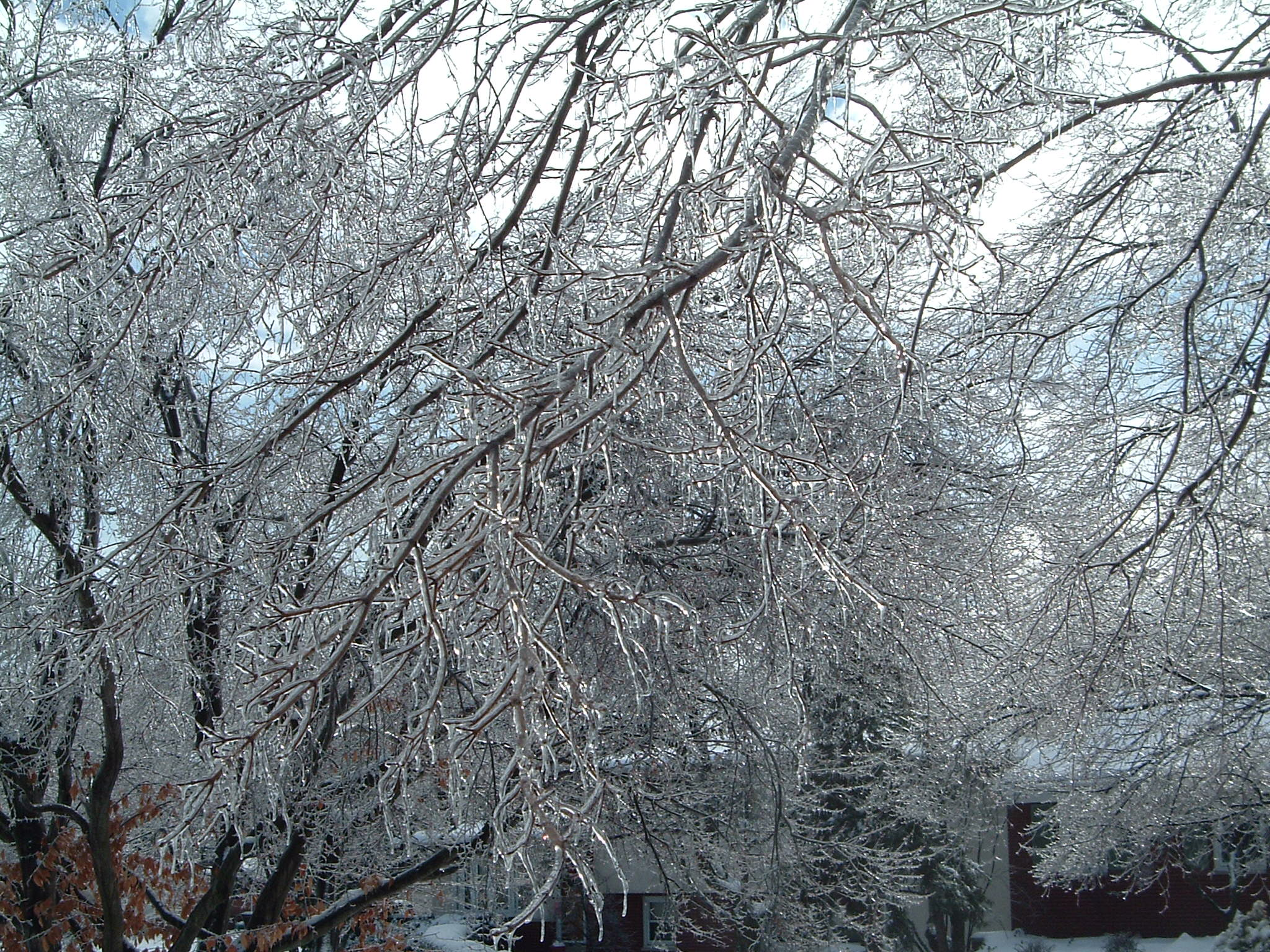
Ice buildup in Columbus, Ohio

Snowfall records were set at Dayton (16 inches (41 cm)), Greenfield (24 inches (61 cm)), and Mansfield (23 inches (58 cm)). A major ice storm impacted southeast and eastern sections of the state. After the storm, a record low was set on Christmas Day when the temperature fell to −17 °F (−27 °C). A total of 678,000 customers went without power. Four died statewide.

The storm devastated the 1,100-unit Woodland Meadows Apartments, one of the largest apartment complexes in the United States. With the power knocked out to much of Columbus, Ohio, including Woodland Meadows, the boiler system that heated the complex's buildings shut down. Pipes burst, and basement apartments flooded. In April 2007, the Columbus City Council voted to tear down Woodland Meadows' 122 buildings, which once housed more than 2,000 government-subsidized tenants. In 2015, the former owner of Woodland Meadows, Jorge Newbery, wrote Burn Zones: Playing Life's Bad Hands, to tell his side of the Woodland Meadows story.

===== Comair computer system crash =====
The storm was particularly notable for causing the regional carrier Comair's computer system to malfunction in light of thousands of flights becoming grounded due to the storm. The antiquated software was only able to accept so many scheduling changes per month, and thus shut down, grounding the airline completely.

=== Canada ===
In Ontario, precipitation was mainly in the form of heavy snow across the southeast sections of the province. Hundreds of flights were cancelled from Toronto's Pearson Airport. Hundreds of car accidents resulted from the storm. One person died.

A wintry mix of precipitation fell across southern Quebec.

== See also ==
- List of Regional Snowfall Index Category 4 winter storms
- 2004 Christmas Eve Snowstorm – struck the Gulf Coast and East Coast
- Extratropical cyclone
- Snowstorm
