= Painter, Virginia =

Painter Virginia
- Town
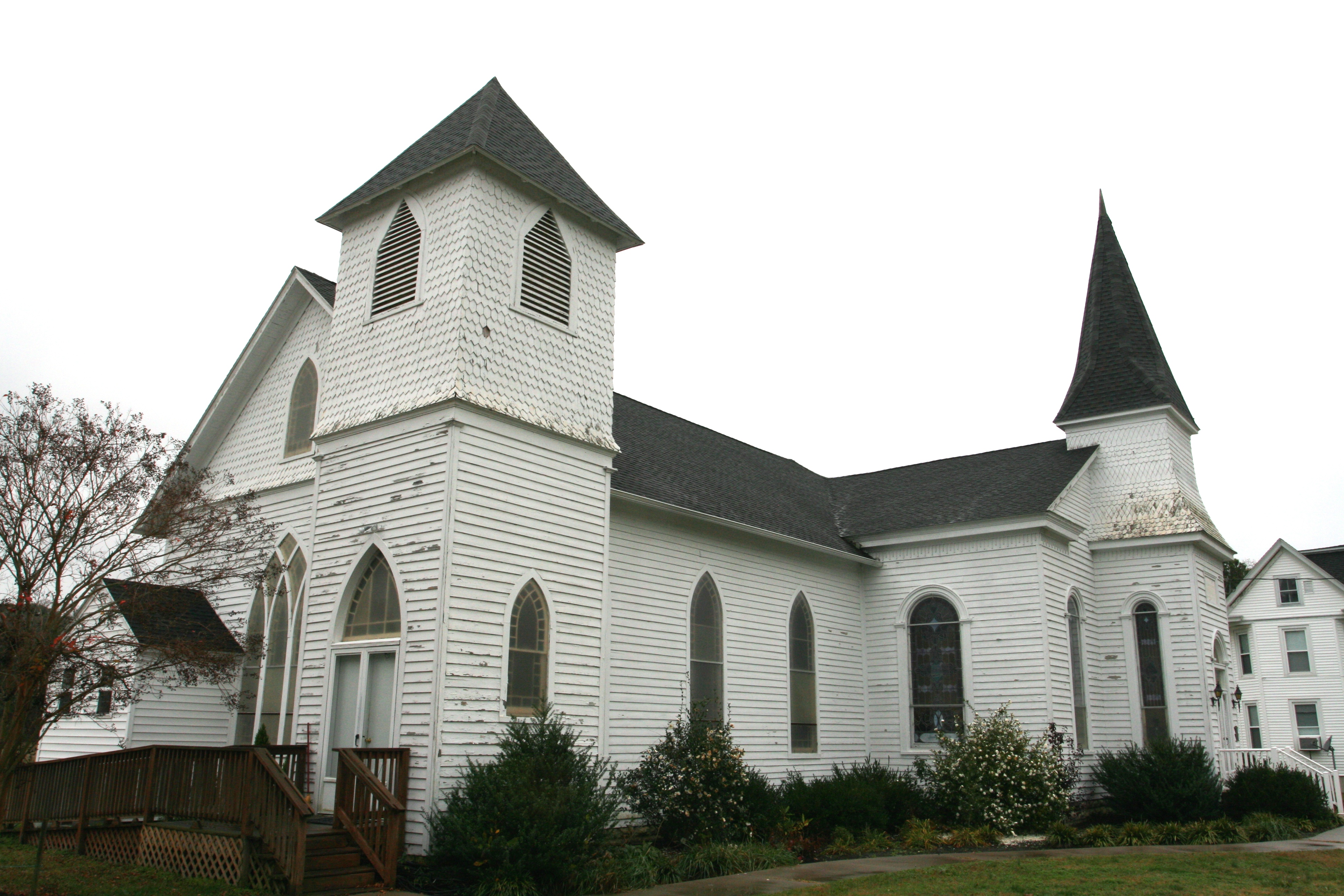
- Painter-Garrisons United Methodist Church, founded in 1784.

- Location in Accomack County and the state of Virginia.
- Coordinates: 37°35′8″N 75°47′0″W
- Country: United States
- State: Virginia
- County: Accomack

Area
  - Total: 0.65 sq mi (1.69 km^{2})
  - Land: 0.65 sq mi (1.69 km^{2})
  - Water: 0 sq mi (0.00 km^{2})
- Elevation: 36 ft (11 m)

Population (2020)
  - Total: 272
  - Estimate (2019): 224
  - Density: 344/sq mi (132.9/km^{2})
- Time zone: UTC−5 (Eastern (EST))
  - Summer (DST): UTC−4 (EDT)
- ZIP code: 23420
- Area codes: 757, 948
- FIPS code: 51-60296
- GNIS feature ID: 1472020

Painter is a town in Accomack County, Virginia, United States. As of the 2020 census, Painter had a population of 272.

== History ==
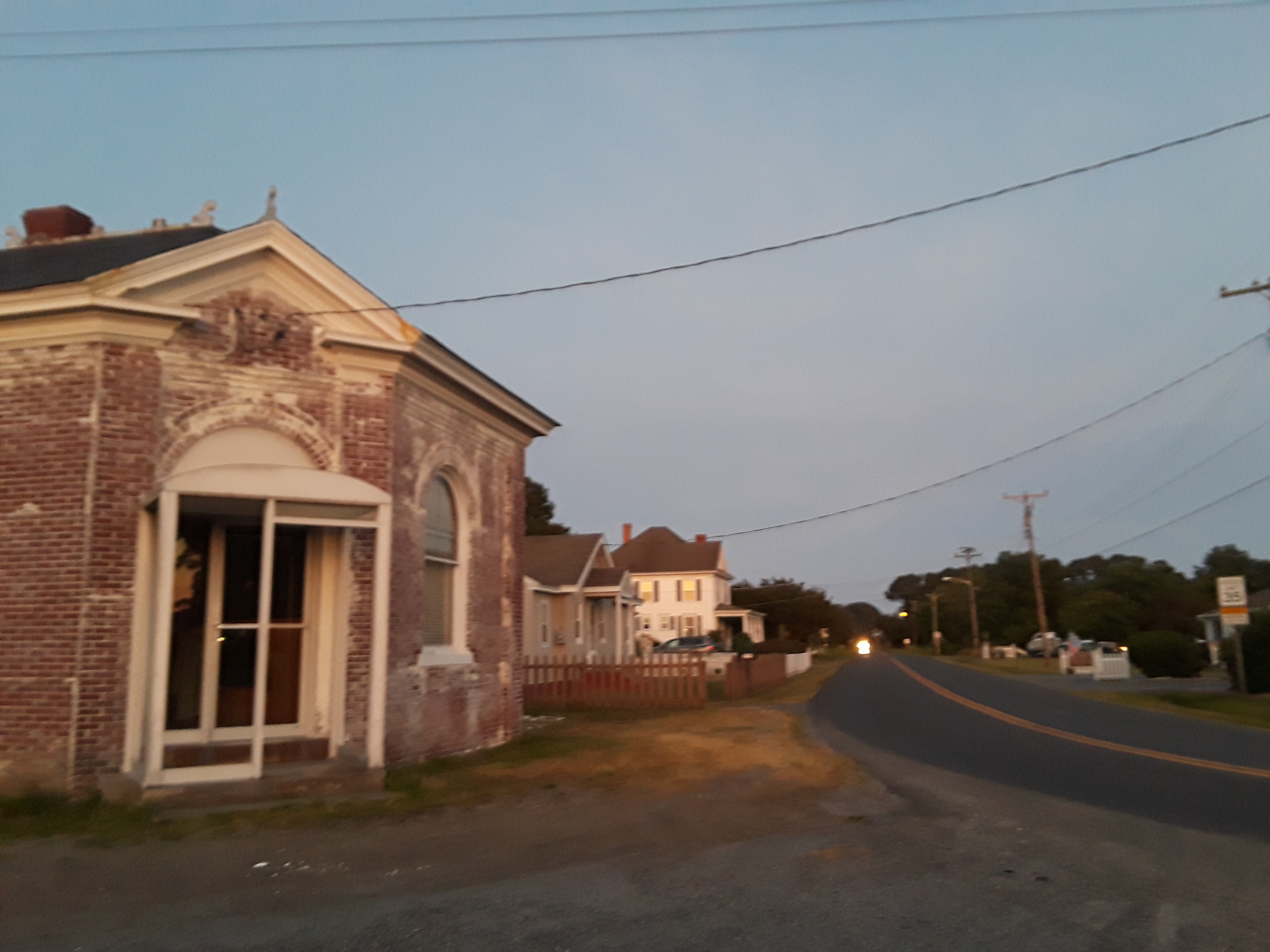
Dusk in Painter, July 2018

From its earliest settlement, most villages and towns on the Eastern Shore of Virginia were located near the coasts at navigable ports where crops or livestock could be transported by boat. The coming of the New York, Pennsylvania, and Norfolk Railroad in the 1880s initiated a shift in population and commerce to the center of the shore and created the need for new towns, including the town of Painter.

The Painter-Garrisons United Methodist Church was established in nearby Mappsburg, Virginia in 1784 when Bishop Francis Asbury made his first of six visits to the home of Jonathan Garrison. The congregation constructed a chapel by 1787, the first house of worship to be built by the Methodist Episcopal Church on the Eastern Shore. The present church was erected in 1855 and was the scene of the establishment of the Independent Convention of Accomack, a group of Methodist Churches that left the northern church in 1860 and, at the close of the war, joined the Methodist Episcopal Church, South. By the turn of the 20th century, as the population continued to shift from Mappsburg to Painter and other new towns, the church erected a second building in Painter in 1906. Twenty years later, the older church was moved to Painter and adjoined to the existing building at which time it took the name Painter-Garrisons Church. The 1855 building is today the second-oldest Methodist Church building on the Eastern Shore.

Willowdale and Central High School are listed on the National Register of Historic Places.

== Geography ==
Painter is located at 37°35′8″N 75°47′0″W (37.585632, −75.783445).

According to the United States Census Bureau, the town has a total area of 0.6 square mile (1.6 km^{2}), all land.

It lies at an elevation of 36 feet.

== Demographics ==
Historical population
| Census | Pop. | Note | %± |
|---|---|---|---|
| 1960 | 349 | | — |
| 1970 | 363 | | 4.0% |
| 1980 | 321 | | −11.6% |
| 1990 | 259 | | −19.3% |
| 2000 | 246 | | −5.0% |
| 2010 | 229 | | −6.9% |
| 2020 | 272 | | 18.8% |
U.S. Decennial Census

At the 2000 census there were 246 people, 104 households, and 69 families living in the town. The population density was 388.0 people per square mile (150.8/km^{2}). There were 117 housing units at an average density of 184.6 per square mile (71.7/km^{2}). The racial makeup of the town was 65.45% White, 30.08% African American, 0.41% Native American, 2.44% from other races, and 1.63% from two or more races. Hispanic or Latino of any race were 5.69%.

Of the 104 households 22.1% had children under the age of 18 living with them, 47.1% were married couples living together, 19.2% had a female householder with no husband present, and 32.7% were non-families. 31.7% of households were one person and 21.2% were one person aged 65 or older. The average household size was 2.37 and the average family size was 2.99.

The age distribution was 22.8% under the age of 18, 9.3% from 18 to 24, 23.2% from 25 to 44, 19.5% from 45 to 64, and 25.2% 65 or older. The median age was 41 years. For every 100 females, there were 75.7 males. For every 100 females aged 18 and over, there were 69.6 males.

The median household income was $19,583 and the median family income was $31,250. Males had a median income of $24,167 versus $20,469 for females. The per capita income for the town was $14,350. About 13.9% of families and 18.5% of the population were below the poverty line, including 37.1% of those under the age of eighteen and 19.4% of those sixty-five or over.

== Climate ==
The climate in this area is characterized by hot, humid summers and generally mild to cool winters. According to the Köppen Climate Classification system, Painter has a humid subtropical climate, abbreviated "Cfa" on climate maps.

Climate data for Painter, Virginia (1991–2020 normals, extremes 1955–present)
| Month | Jan | Feb | Mar | Apr | May | Jun | Jul | Aug | Sep | Oct | Nov | Dec | Year |
|---|---|---|---|---|---|---|---|---|---|---|---|---|---|
| Record high °F (°C) | 75 (24) | 80 (27) | 85 (29) | 93 (34) | 95 (35) | 99 (37) | 101 (38) | 98 (37) | 98 (37) | 93 (34) | 82 (28) | 78 (26) | 101 (38) |
| Mean maximum °F (°C) | 67.1 (19.5) | 68.4 (20.2) | 75.5 (24.2) | 82.6 (28.1) | 88.0 (31.1) | 93.7 (34.3) | 95.6 (35.3) | 92.7 (33.7) | 89.1 (31.7) | 83.1 (28.4) | 74.6 (23.7) | 68.9 (20.5) | 96.8 (36.0) |
| Mean daily maximum °F (°C) | 48.2 (9.0) | 50.8 (10.4) | 57.5 (14.2) | 67.9 (19.9) | 75.7 (24.3) | 83.4 (28.6) | 87.6 (30.9) | 85.5 (29.7) | 80.3 (26.8) | 70.9 (21.6) | 60.2 (15.7) | 52.0 (11.1) | 68.3 (20.2) |
| Daily mean °F (°C) | 39.3 (4.1) | 41.1 (5.1) | 47.4 (8.6) | 57.2 (14.0) | 65.7 (18.7) | 74.0 (23.3) | 78.5 (25.8) | 76.4 (24.7) | 71.2 (21.8) | 61.1 (16.2) | 50.8 (10.4) | 43.1 (6.2) | 58.8 (14.9) |
| Mean daily minimum °F (°C) | 30.4 (−0.9) | 31.4 (−0.3) | 37.3 (2.9) | 46.5 (8.1) | 55.7 (13.2) | 64.6 (18.1) | 69.4 (20.8) | 67.4 (19.7) | 62.1 (16.7) | 51.3 (10.7) | 41.4 (5.2) | 34.2 (1.2) | 49.3 (9.6) |
| Mean minimum °F (°C) | 14.4 (−9.8) | 17.6 (−8.0) | 23.1 (−4.9) | 32.5 (0.3) | 41.6 (5.3) | 51.6 (10.9) | 59.0 (15.0) | 57.6 (14.2) | 48.9 (9.4) | 36.4 (2.4) | 25.9 (−3.4) | 20.4 (−6.4) | 12.3 (−10.9) |
| Record low °F (°C) | −5 (−21) | −1 (−18) | 9 (−13) | 24 (−4) | 31 (−1) | 36 (2) | 47 (8) | 44 (7) | 39 (4) | 24 (−4) | 16 (−9) | −1 (−18) | −5 (−21) |
| Average precipitation inches (mm) | 3.55 (90) | 3.07 (78) | 3.96 (101) | 3.28 (83) | 3.65 (93) | 4.44 (113) | 4.99 (127) | 4.48 (114) | 4.53 (115) | 4.28 (109) | 3.05 (77) | 3.94 (100) | 47.22 (1,199) |
| Average snowfall inches (cm) | 3.4 (8.6) | 1.5 (3.8) | 0.5 (1.3) | 0.0 (0.0) | 0.0 (0.0) | 0.0 (0.0) | 0.0 (0.0) | 0.0 (0.0) | 0.0 (0.0) | 0.0 (0.0) | 0.0 (0.0) | 1.2 (3.0) | 6.6 (17) |
| Average precipitation days (≥ 0.01 in) | 10.6 | 9.5 | 11.2 | 10.1 | 10.4 | 9.7 | 10.3 | 10.0 | 8.2 | 8.9 | 8.8 | 11.2 | 118.9 |
| Average snowy days (≥ 0.1 in) | 1.2 | 0.9 | 0.4 | 0.0 | 0.0 | 0.0 | 0.0 | 0.0 | 0.0 | 0.0 | 0.0 | 0.7 | 3.2 |
Source: NOAA

== Transportation ==
=== Major highways ===
- US 13
- SR 182

=== Public transportation ===
STAR Transit provides public transit services, linking Painter with Cape Charles, Onley, and other communities in Accomack and Northampton counties on the Eastern Shore.

=== Railroads ===
The Bay Coast Railroad provided Painter with freight rail service until going out of business in 2018.
