= Willowdale (Painter, Virginia) =

Historic house in Virginia, United States

- U.S. National Register of Historic Places
- Virginia Landmarks Register
- Location within Virginia Location within the United States
- Location: 18412 Willowdale Dr., Painter, Virginia
- Coordinates: 37°33′38″N 75°45′53″W
- Area: 16 acres (6.5 ha)
- Built: 1666
- Built by: Smith, John; et.al
- Architectural style: Colonial Revival
- NRHP reference No.: 07000401
- VLR No.: 001-0062

Significant dates
- Added to NRHP: May 2, 2007
- Designated VLR: September 6, 2006

Willowdale, also known as Smith Place, Gunther Farm, and Willow Dale, is a historic home located at Painter, Accomack County, Virginia. It is a two-story, five-bay, gambrel roofed, frame dwelling with brick ends. There is a two-bay, single story extension that provides service from a 1 1/2-story kitchen with a large brick cooking fireplace at the south end. The wing dates to the early-19th century. The main block is an expansion of a 17th-century patent house of 1 1/2 stories that now forms the parlor at the north end of the main block. The house is representative of the vernacular "big house, little house, colonnade, kitchen" style that was common in colonial homes on the Eastern Shore of Virginia. Also on the property are the contributing ruins of a barn. Willowdale is one of the few remaining examples of the dwelling of an early colonial settler, landowner and farmer. The Smith family remained owners of Willowdale from 1666 until 2018.

It was added to the National Register of Historic Places in 2007.
