= Central High School (Painter, Virginia) =

Historic high school in Virginia, US

- U.S. National Register of Historic Places
- Virginia Landmarks Register
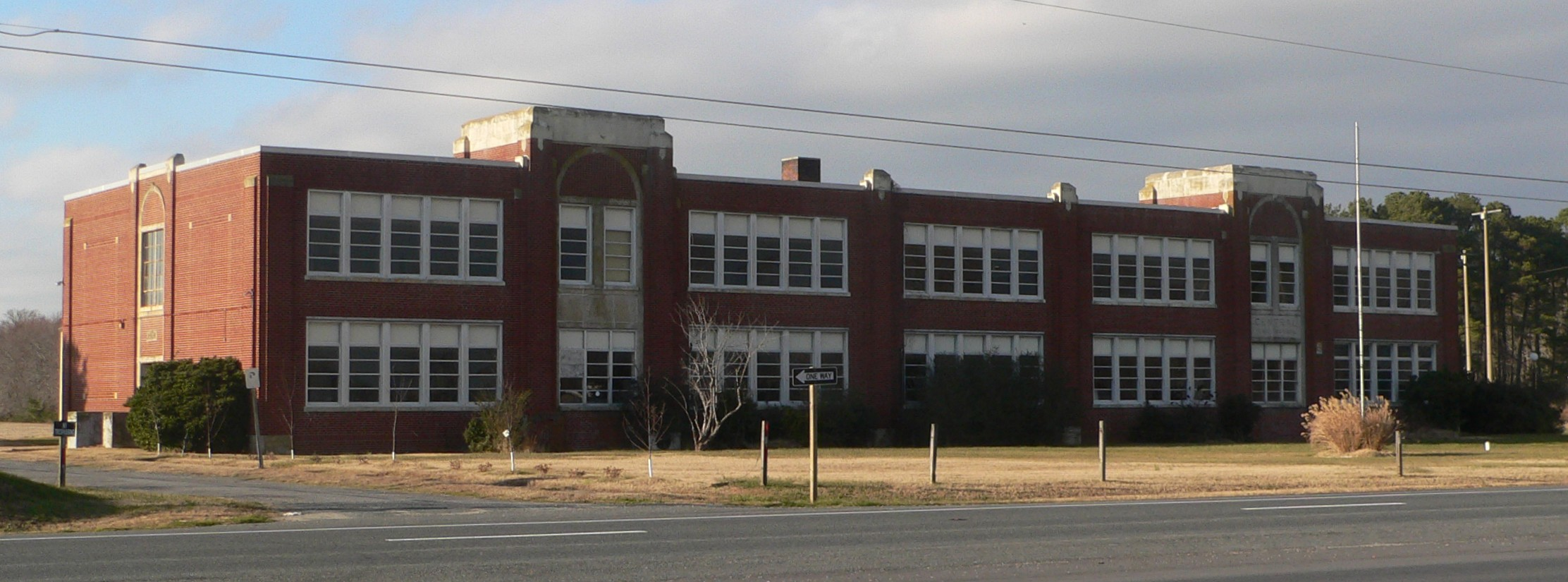
- Central High School in 2014

- Location within Virginia Location within the United States
- Location: 32308 Lankford Hwy., near Painter, Virginia
- Coordinates: 37.599514°N 75.77681°W
- Area: 12.22 acres (4.95 ha)
- Built: 1932-1935
- Built by: J.W. Hudson; J.W. Hudson, Jr.
- Architectural style: Art Deco, Colonial Revival
- NRHP reference No.: 10000561
- VLR No.: 001-5065

Significant dates
- Added to NRHP: August 16, 2010
- Designated VLR: June 17, 2010

Central High School is a historic high school building located near Painter, Accomack County, Virginia.

== History ==
Central High School was built in 1932, with an addition in 1935, and is a two-story, T-shaped, brick building with brick and stone detailing in the Art Deco style. The 1935 addition was funded by the Public Works Administration.

The building served as a high school until 1984, when it was converted to a middle school.

It was sold by Accomack County to a New York furniture designer in 2008, who again relisted the property in 2020.

Also on the property are a contributing one-story wood-frame double classroom building, one-story vocational school building, and a one-story Colonial Revival style dwelling that served as the home economics building.

It was added to the National Register of Historic Places in 2011.
