= Quinby, Virginia =

- Census-designated place
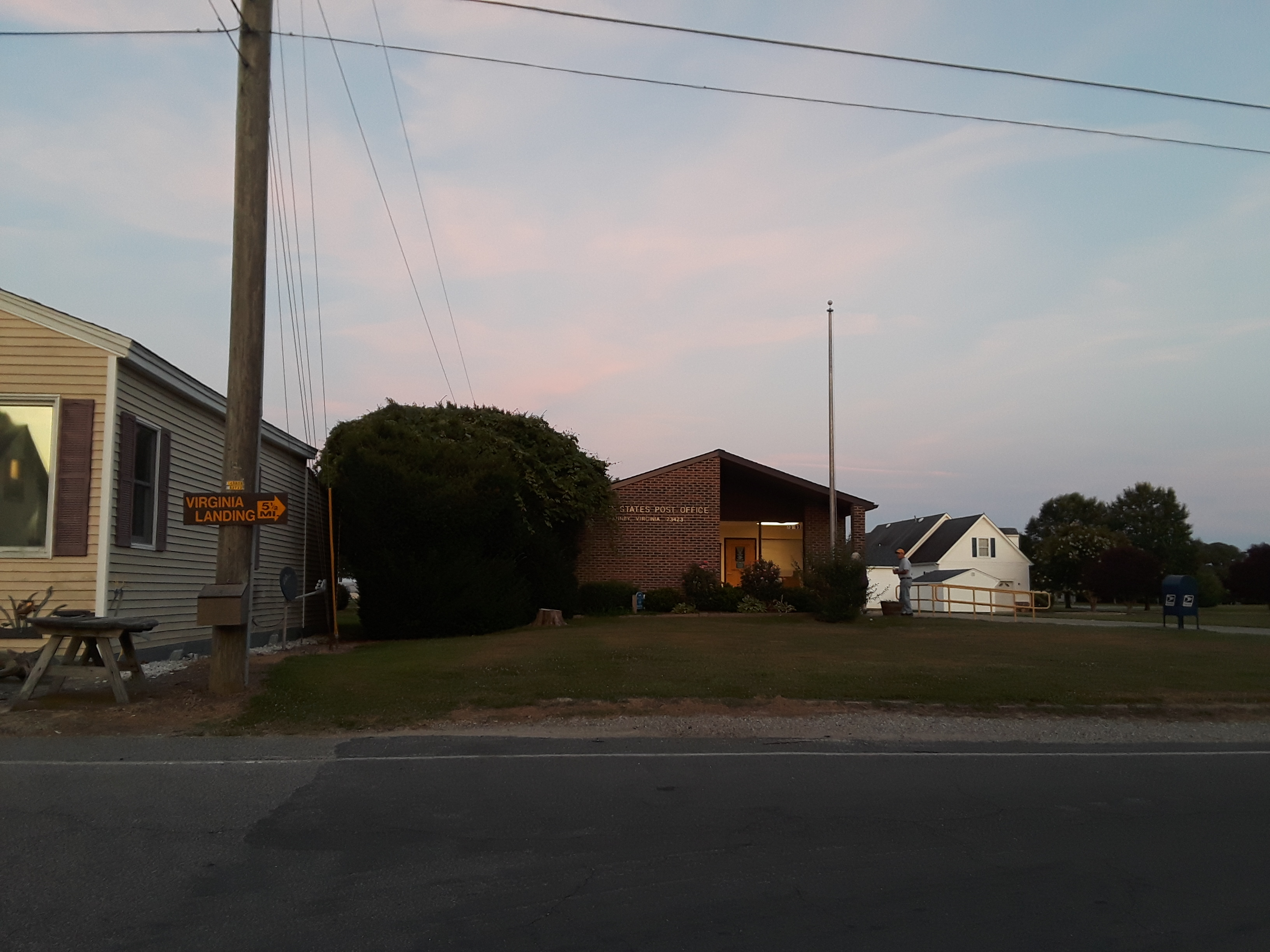
- Quinby post office at dusk, July 2018

- Location in Accomack County and the state of Virginia.
- Coordinates: 37°33′12″N 75°44′12″W
- Country: United States
- State: Virginia
- County: Accomack
- Elevation: 7 ft (2.1 m)

Population (2020)
  - Total: 285
- Time zone: UTC−5 (Eastern (EST))
  - Summer (DST): UTC−4 (EDT)
- FIPS code: 51-48776
- GNIS feature ID: 2584906

Quinby is a census-designated place (CDP) in Accomack County, Virginia, United States. It was first listed as a CDP in 2010. Per the 2020 census, the population was 285.

== Geography ==
The CDP lies at an elevation of 7 feet.

== Demographics ==
Historical population
| Census | Pop. | Note | %± |
|---|---|---|---|
| 2010 | 282 | | — |
| 2020 | 285 | | 1.1% |
U.S. Decennial Census; 2010 2020

Quinby was first listed as a census designated place in the 2010 U.S. census.

=== 2020 census ===
Quinby CDP, Virginia – Racial and ethnic composition Note: the US Census treats Hispanic/Latino as an ethnic category. This table excludes Latinos from the racial categories and assigns them to a separate category. Hispanics/Latinos may be of any race.
| Race / Ethnicity (NH = Non-Hispanic) | Pop 2010 | Pop 2020 | % 2010 | % 2020 |
|---|---|---|---|---|
| White alone (NH) | 250 | 253 | 88.65% | 88.77% |
| Black or African American alone (NH) | 20 | 8 | 7.09% | 2.81% |
| Native American or Alaska Native alone (NH) | 2 | 0 | 0.71% | 0.00% |
| Asian alone (NH) | 0 | 1 | 0.00% | 0.35% |
| Pacific Islander alone (NH) | 0 | 0 | 0.00% | 0.00% |
| Some Other Race alone (NH) | 0 | 0 | 0.00% | 0.00% |
| Mixed Race or Multi-Racial (NH) | 1 | 11 | 0.35% | 3.86% |
| Hispanic or Latino (any race) | 9 | 12 | 3.19% | 4.21% |
| Total | 282 | 285 | 100.00% | 100.00% |
