= Indigenous peoples of the Americas =

- Indigenous population throughout the Americas

Regions with significant populations
- Mexico: 11,800,247 – 23,229,089 (2020)
- United States: 3,727,135 – 9,666,058 (2020)
- Peru: 6,783,697 (2025)
- Guatemala: 6,471,670 (2018)
- Bolivia: 4,277,316 (2024)
- Chile: 2,099,204 (2024)
- Colombia: 1,905,617 (2018)
- Canada: 1,807,250 (2021)
- Brazil: 1,694,836 (2022)
- Argentina: 1,306,730 (2022)
- Ecuador: 1,302,057 (2022)
- Venezuela: 724,592 (2011)
- Panama: 698,114 (2023)
- Honduras: 601,021 (2013)
- Nicaragua: 443,847 (2005)
- Paraguay: 140,039 (2022)
- Costa Rica: 104,143 (2011)
- Uruguay: 84,337 (2023)
- Guyana: 78,492 (2012)
- El Salvador: 68,148 (2024)
- Greenland: 50,189 (2020)
- Belize: 44,322 (2022)
- Suriname: 20,344 (2012)
- Puerto Rico: 19,839 (2010)
- Saint Vincent and the Grenadines: 5,587 (2023)
- Dominica: 2,576 (2011)
- Trinidad and Tobago: 1,394 (2011)
- Saint Lucia: 951 (2010)
- Antigua and Barbuda: 327 (2011)
- Grenada: 221 (2021)
- Saint Kitts and Nevis: 8 (2011)

Languages
- Numerous Indigenous American languages (both extant and extinct); Colonial European languages: Spanish · English · Portuguese · French · Danish · Dutch · Russian (formerly spoken in Russian Alaska)

Religion
- Mostly Christianity (Catholicism · Protestantism · Eastern Orthodoxy · Native American Church · Neo-American Church · Restorationism); Minorities still practice various Indigenous American religions and mythologies

Related ethnic groups
- Métis · Mestiços · Mestizos · Zambos · Pardos

The Indigenous peoples of the Americas, are the first inhabitants of the Americas or the Western Hemisphere. Their ancestors are among the pre-Columbian population of South or North America, including Central America and the Caribbean. Indigenous peoples live throughout the Americas.

There are at least 1,000 different Indigenous languages of the Americas still in use in the 21st century. Some languages, including Quechua, Arawak, Aymara, Guaraní, Nahuatl, and some Mayan languages, have millions of speakers and are recognized as official by governments in Bolivia, Peru, Paraguay, and Greenland.

Indigenous peoples, whether residing in rural or urban areas, often maintain aspects of their cultural practices, including religion, social organization, and subsistence practices. Over time, these cultures have evolved, preserving traditional customs while adapting to modern needs. Some Indigenous groups remain relatively isolated from Western culture, with some still classified as uncontacted peoples.

The Americas also host millions of individuals of mixed Indigenous, European, and sometimes African or Asian descent, historically referred to as mestizos in Spanish-speaking countries. In many Latin American nations, people of partial Indigenous descent constitute a majority or significant portion of the population, particularly in Central America, Mexico, Peru, Bolivia, Ecuador, Colombia, Venezuela, Chile, and Paraguay. Mestizos outnumber Indigenous peoples in most Spanish-speaking countries, according to estimates of ethnic cultural identification. However, since Indigenous communities in the Americas are defined by cultural identification and kinship rather than ancestry or race, mestizos are typically not counted among the Indigenous population unless they speak an Indigenous language or identify with a specific Indigenous culture. Additionally, many individuals of wholly Indigenous descent who do not follow Indigenous traditions or speak an Indigenous language have been classified or self-identified as mestizo due to assimilation into the dominant Hispanic culture. In recent years, the self-identified Indigenous population in many countries has increased as individuals reclaim their heritage amid rising Indigenous-led movements for self-determination and social justice.

In past centuries, Indigenous peoples had diverse societal, governmental, and subsistence systems. Some Indigenous peoples were historically hunter-gatherers, while others practiced agriculture and aquaculture. Various Indigenous societies developed complex social structures, including precontact monumental architecture, organized cities, city-states, chiefdoms, states, monarchies, republics, confederacies, and empires. These societies possessed varying levels of knowledge in fields such as engineering, architecture, mathematics, astronomy, writing, physics, medicine, agriculture, irrigation, geology, mining, metallurgy, art, sculpture, and goldsmithing.

== Terminology ==
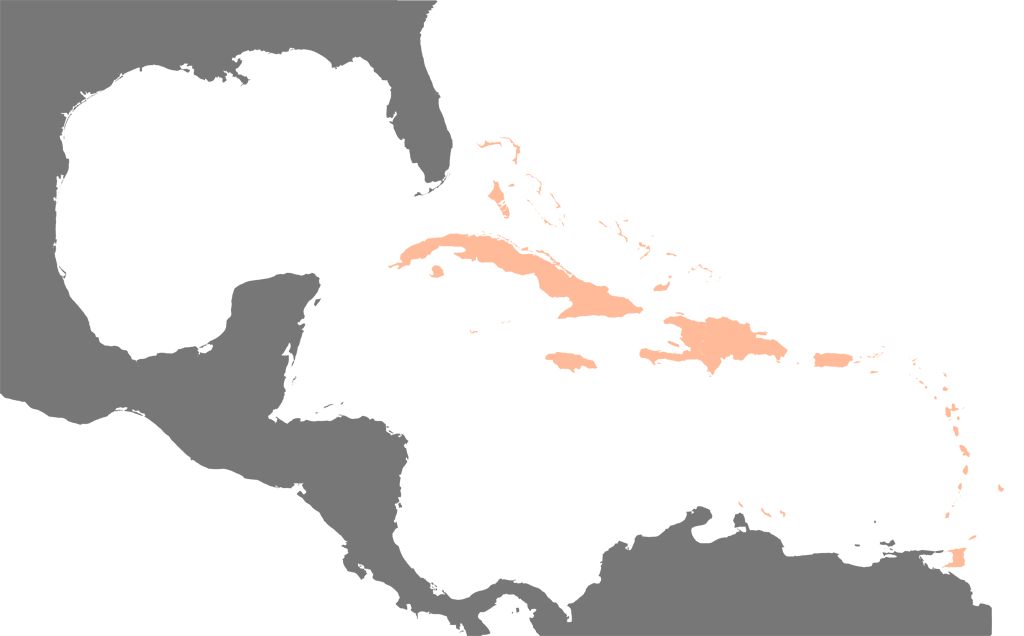
The West Indies (or Antilles) in relation to the continental Americas

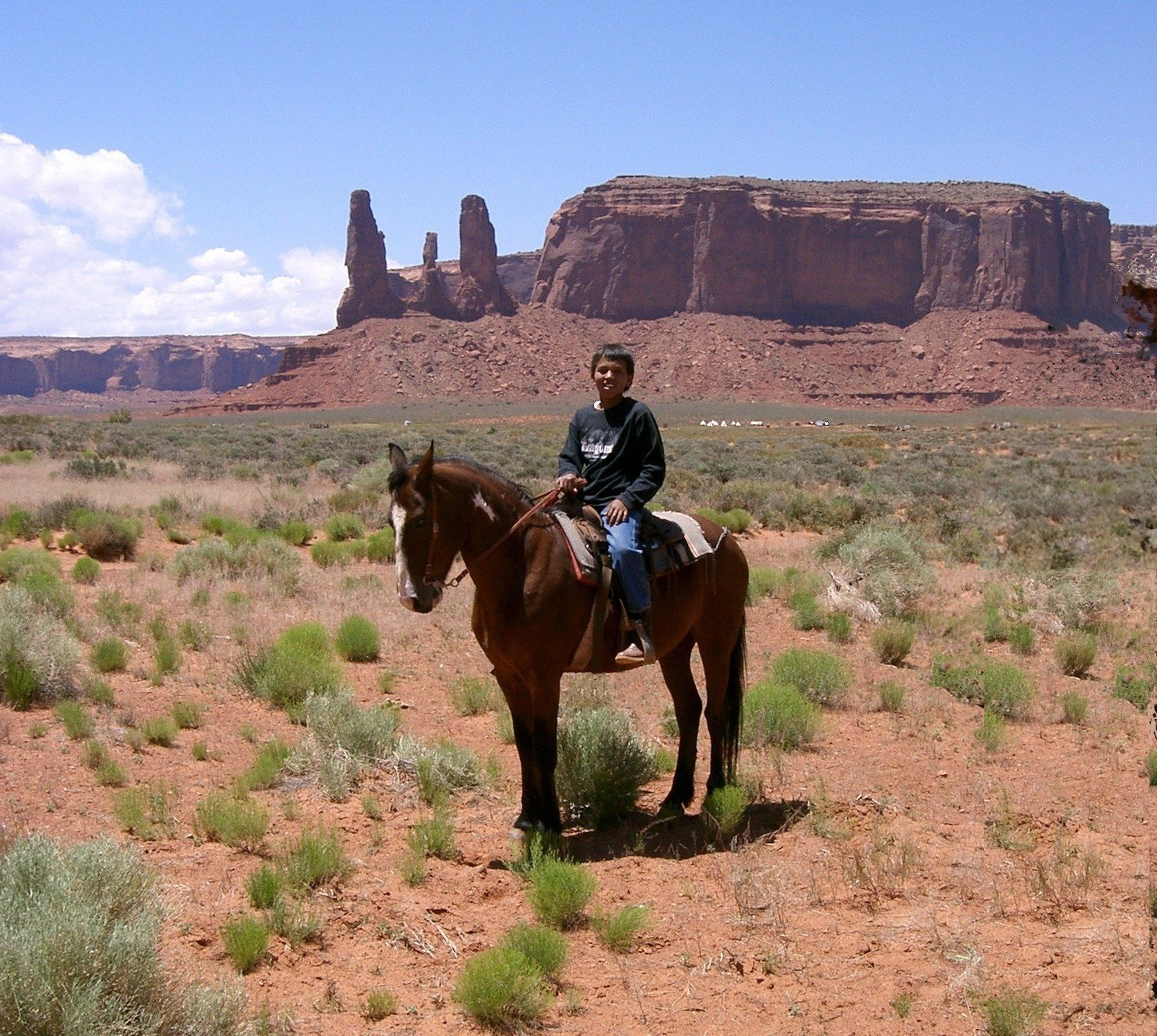
A Navajo boy in the desert in present-day Monument Valley in Arizona with the "Three Sisters" rock formation in the background in 2007

Application of the term "Indian" originated with Christopher Columbus, who, when searching for India, made landfall in the Americas but thought he had arrived in the East Indies.

The islands came to be known as the "West Indies" (or "Antilles"), a name that is still used to describe the islands. This led to the blanket term "Indies" and "Indians" (Spanish: indios; Portuguese: índios; French: indiens; Dutch: indianen) for the Indigenous inhabitants, which implied some kind of ethnic or cultural unity among the Indigenous peoples of the Americas. This unifying concept, codified in law, religion, and politics, was not originally accepted by the myriad groups of Indigenous peoples themselves but has since been embraced or tolerated by many over the last two centuries. The term First Nations is used in Canada to identify that type of Indigenous people.

The term "Indian" (or First Nations in Canada) generally does not include the culturally and linguistically distinct Indigenous peoples of the Arctic regions of the Americas, including the Aleuts, Inuit, or Yupik peoples. These peoples entered the continent as a second, more recent wave of migration several thousand years later and have much more recent genetic and cultural commonalities with the Indigenous peoples of Siberia. However, these groups are nonetheless considered among the "Indigenous peoples of the Americas".

The term Amerindian, a portmanteau of "American Indian", was coined in 1902 by the American Anthropological Association. It has been controversial ever since its creation. It was immediately rejected by some leading members of the Association, and, while adopted by many, it was never universally accepted. While never popular in Indigenous communities themselves, it remains a preferred term among some anthropologists, notably in some parts of Canada and the English-speaking Caribbean.

"Indigenous peoples in Canada" is used as the collective name for First Nations, Inuit, and Métis. The term Aboriginal peoples as a collective noun (also describing First Nations, Inuit, and Métis) is a specific term of art used in some legal documents, including the Constitution Act, 1982. Over time, as societal perceptions and government–indigenous relationships have shifted, many historical terms have changed definitions or been replaced as they have fallen out of favor. The use of the term "Indian" is frowned upon because it represents the imposition and restriction of Indigenous peoples and cultures by the Canadian Government. The terms "Native" and "Eskimo" are generally regarded as disrespectful (in Canada), and so are rarely used unless specifically required. While "Indigenous peoples" is the preferred term, many individuals or communities may choose to describe their identity using a different term.

The Métis people of Canada can be contrasted, for instance, to the Indigenous-European mixed-race mestizos (or caboclos in Brazil) of Hispanic America whose large populations constitute outright majorities, pluralities, or at the least large minorities in most Latin American countries. They identify largely as an ethnic group distinct from Europeans and Indigenous, but consider themselves a subset of the European-derived Hispanic or Brazilian peoplehood in culture and ethnicity (cf. ladinos).

Among Spanish-speaking countries, indígenas or pueblos indígenas ("Indigenous peoples") is a common term, though nativos or pueblos nativos ('native peoples') may also be heard; moreover, aborigen ('aborigine') is used in Argentina and pueblos originarios ('original peoples') is common in Chile. The Spanish equivalent to Indian, nevertheless, could be used to mean any hunter-gatherer or full-blooded Indigenous person, particularly to continents other than Europe or Africa—for example, indios filipinos.

In Portuguese-speaking Brazil, indígenas and povos originários ("Indigenous peoples") are common formal-sounding designations, while índio ('Indian') is still the more often heard term (the noun for the South-Asian nationality being indiano), but since the early 2010s has been considered offensive and pejorative. Aborígene and nativo are rarely used in Brazil in Indigenous-specific contexts (e.g., aborígene is usually understood as the ethnonym for Indigenous Australians).

Indigenous peoples of the United States are commonly known as Native Americans, Indians, First Americans, as well as Alaska Natives. The term "Indian" is still used in some communities and remains in use in the official names of many institutions and businesses in Indian Country.

=== Name controversy ===
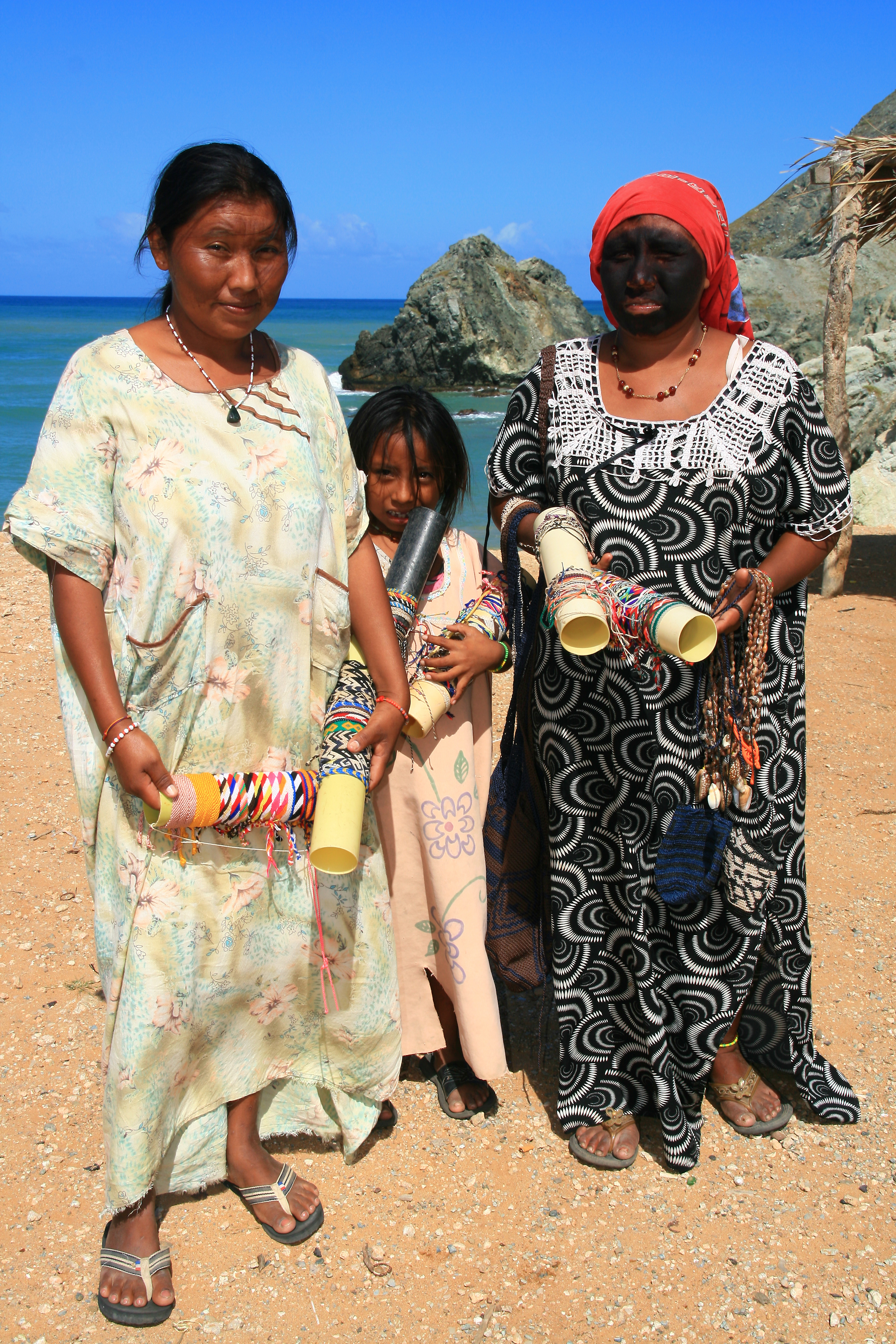
Wayuu women in the Guajira Peninsula, which encompasses parts of Colombia and Venezuela

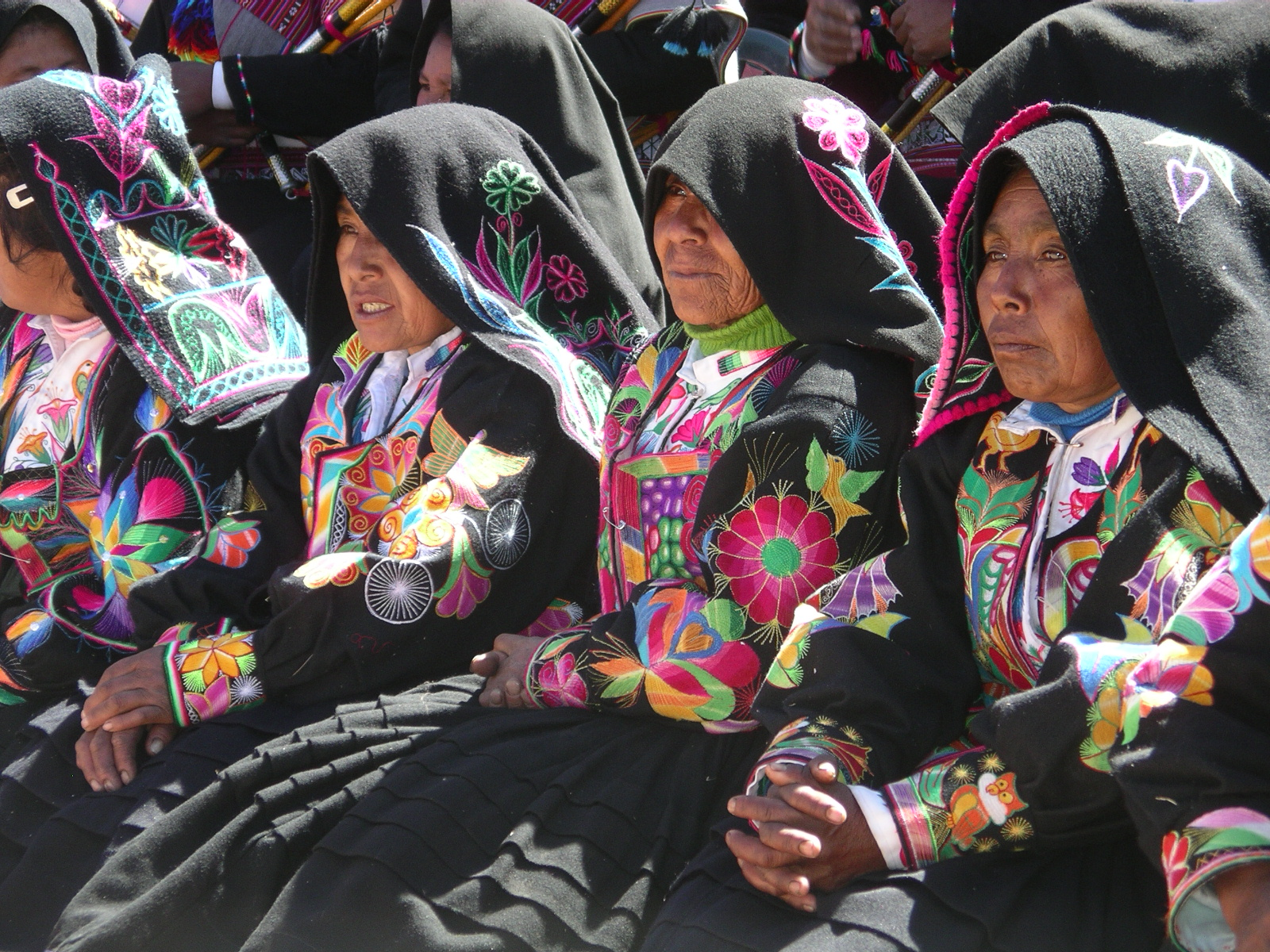
Quechua women in festive dress on Taquile Island on Lake Titicaca, west of Peru

The various nations, tribes, and bands of Indigenous peoples of the Americas have differing preferences in terminology for themselves. While there are regional and generational variations in which umbrella terms are preferred for Indigenous peoples as a whole, in general, most Indigenous peoples prefer to be identified by the name of their specific nation, tribe, or band.

Early settlers often adopted terms that some tribes used for each other, not realizing these were derogatory terms used by enemies. When discussing broader subsets of peoples, naming has often been based on shared language, region, or historical relationship. Many English exonyms have been used to refer to the Indigenous peoples of the Americas. Some of these names were based on foreign language terms used by earlier explorers and colonists, while others resulted from the colonists' attempts to translate or transliterate endonyms from the native languages. Other terms arose during periods of conflict between the colonists and Indigenous peoples.

Since the late 20th century, Indigenous peoples in the Americas have been more vocal about how they want to be addressed, pushing to suppress the use of terms widely considered to be obsolete, inaccurate, or racist. During the latter half of the 20th century and the rise of the Indian rights movement, the United States federal government responded by proposing the use of the term "Native American", to recognize the primacy of Indigenous peoples' tenure in the nation. As may be expected among people of over 400 different cultures in the US alone, not all of the people intended to be described by this term have agreed on its use or adopted it. No single group naming convention has been accepted by all Indigenous peoples in the Americas. Most prefer to be addressed as people of their tribe or nations when not speaking about Native Americans/American Indians as a whole.

Since the 1970s, the word "Indigenous", which is capitalized when referring to people, has gradually emerged as a favored umbrella term. The capitalization is to acknowledge that Indigenous peoples have cultures and societies that are equal to Europeans, Africans, and Asians. This has recently been acknowledged in the AP Stylebook. Some consider it improper to refer to Indigenous people as "Indigenous Americans" or to append any colonial nationality to the term because Indigenous cultures existed before European colonization. Indigenous groups have territorial claims that are different from modern national and international borders, and when labeled as part of a country, their traditional lands are not acknowledged. Some who have written guidelines consider it more appropriate to describe an Indigenous person as "living in" or "of" the Americas, rather than calling them "American"; or simply calling them "Indigenous" without any addition of a colonial state.

== History ==
=== Peopling of the Americas ===
Map of early human migrations based on the Out of Africa theory; figures are in thousands of years ago (kya).

The peopling of the Americas is believed to have begun when Paleolithic hunter-gatherers (Paleo-Indians) entered North America from the North Asian Mammoth steppe via the Beringia land bridge, which had formed between northeastern Siberia and western Alaska due to the lowering of sea level during the Last Glacial Maximum (26,000 to 19,000 years ago). These populations expanded south of the Laurentide ice sheet, either by sea or land, and spread rapidly southward, occupying both North and South America no later than 14,000 years ago, and possibly before 20,000 years ago. The earliest populations in the Americas, before roughly 10,000 years ago, are known as Paleo-Indians. Indigenous peoples of the Americas have been linked to Siberian populations by the distribution of blood types, and in genetic composition as reflected by molecular data, such as DNA.

While there is general agreement that the Americas were first settled from Asia, the migration patterns and the place(s) of origin in Eurasia of the peoples who migrated to the Americas remain unclear. The most generally accepted theory is that Ancient Beringians moved when sea levels were significantly lowered due to the Quaternary glaciation, following herds of now-extinct Pleistocene megafauna along ice-free corridors that stretched between the Laurentide and Cordilleran ice sheets. Another proposed route has them migrating down the Pacific coast to South America as far as Chile, either on foot or using boats. Any archaeological evidence of coastal occupation during the last Ice Age would now have been covered by the sea level rise, up to a hundred meters since then.

The precise date for the peopling of the Americas is a long-standing open question. While advances in archaeology, Pleistocene geology, physical anthropology, and DNA analysis have progressively shed more light on the subject, significant questions remain unresolved. The Clovis First theory refers to the hypothesis that the Clovis culture represents the earliest human presence in the Americas about 13,000 years ago. Evidence of pre-Clovis cultures has accumulated and pushed back the possible date of the first peopling of the Americas. Academics generally believe that humans reached North America south of the Laurentide Ice Sheet at some point between 15,000 and 20,000 years ago. Current debates center around four glacial-age openings which could have allowed entry into North America: coastal around 24,000 and 15,000 years ago, inland around 14,000 years ago, and coastal around 12,000 years ago. The Swan Point Archaeological Site located in Alaska has yielded the oldest evidence of human habitation that is not disputed, with artifacts that have radiocarbon dates of 14,000 years, indicating the site was occupied around 12,000 BCE.

==== Pre-Columbian era ====
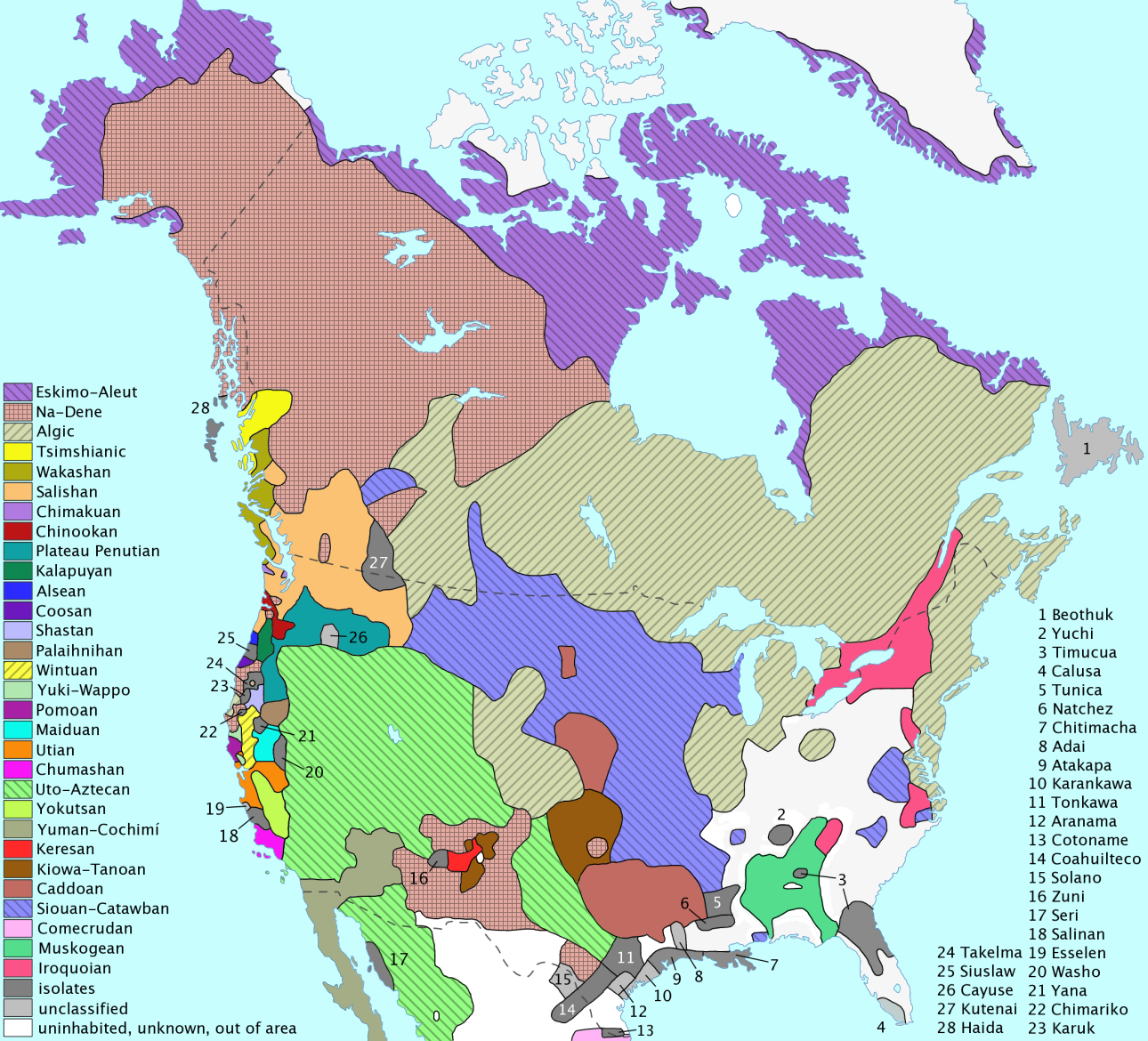
Language families of Indigenous peoples in North America shown across present-day Canada, Greenland, the United States, and northern Mexico

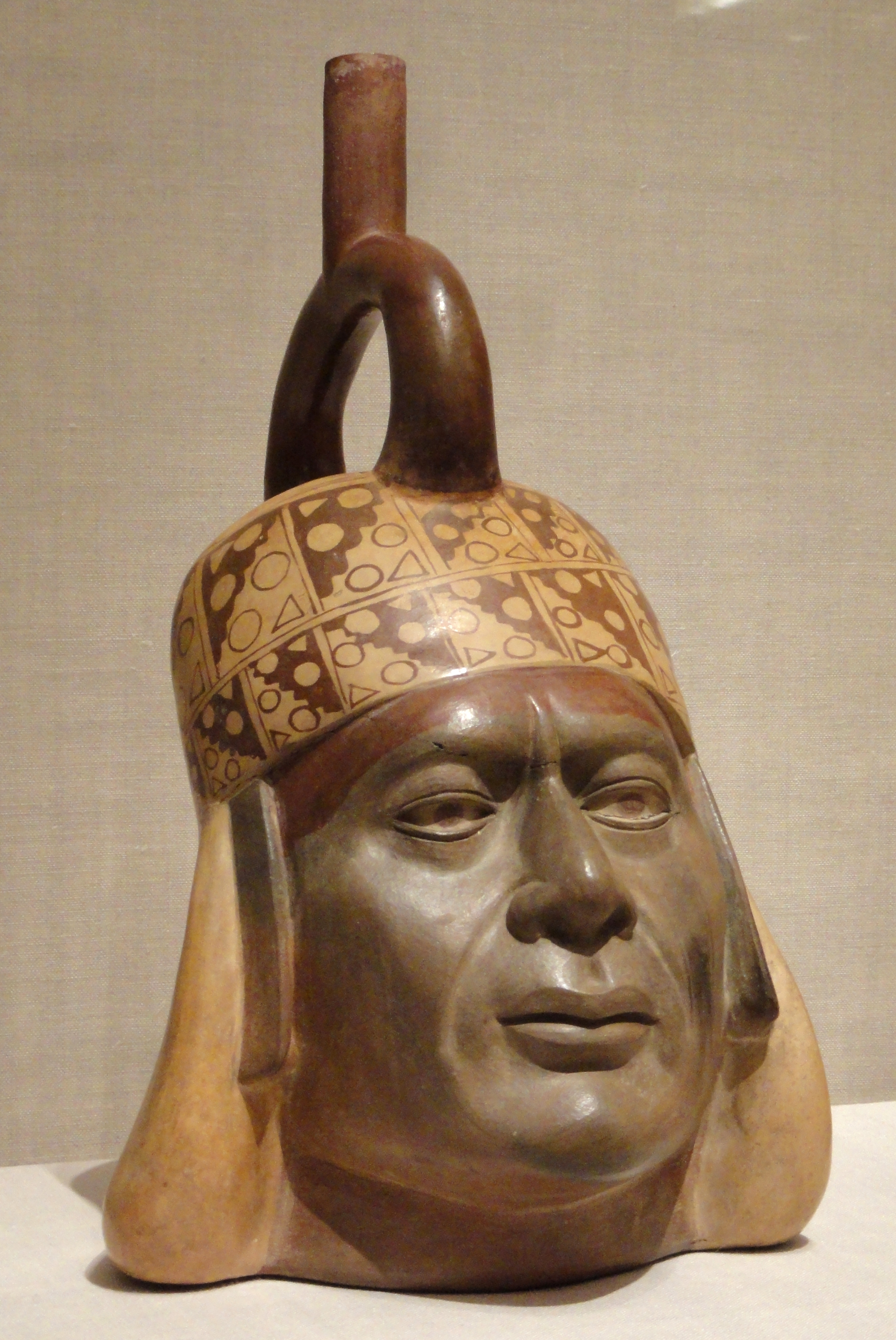
Moche portrait vessel from Peru, 100 BCE–500 CE

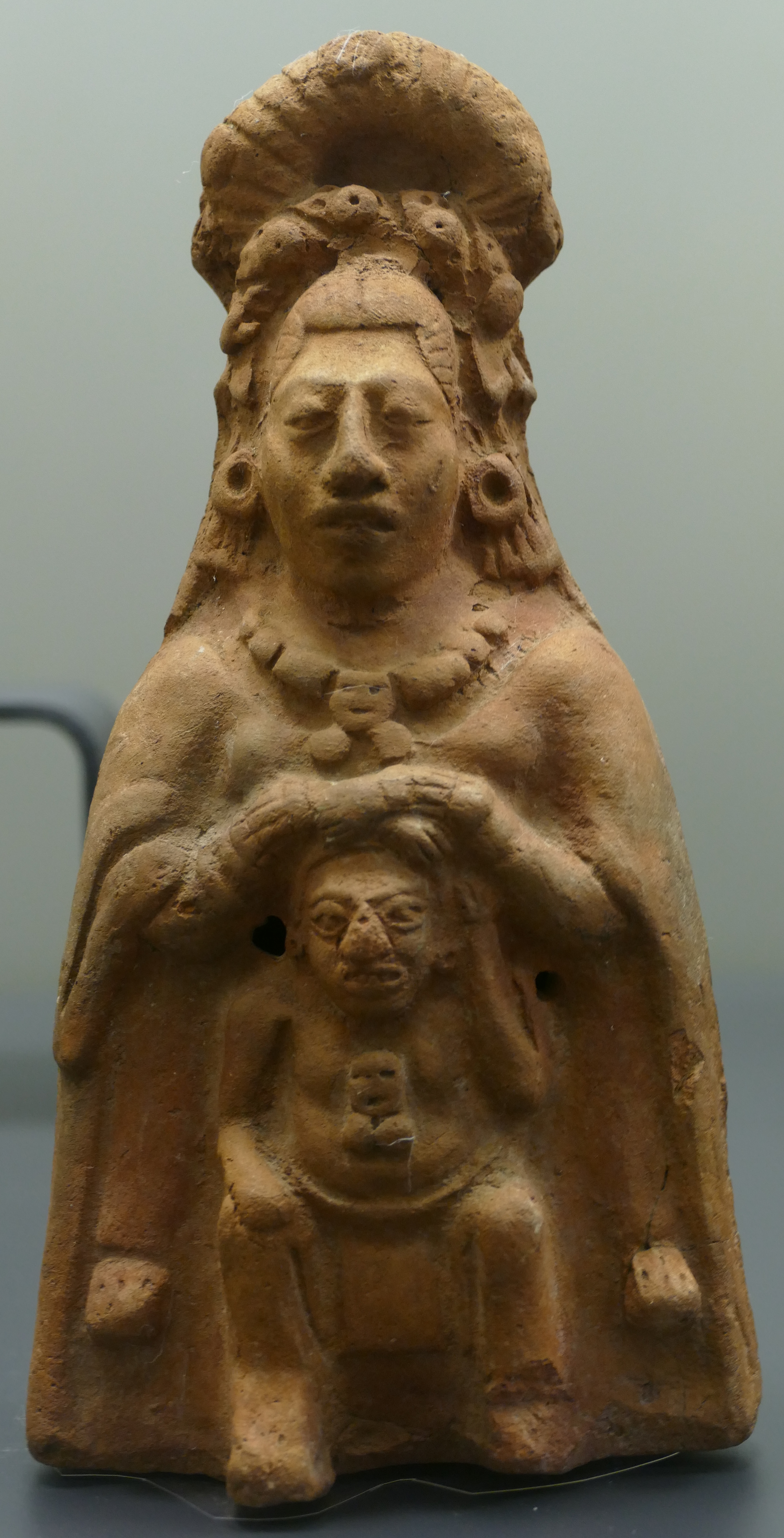
Ceramic portrait of a Maya noblewoman, Jaina Island, Mexico, 600–800 CE

While technically referring to the era before Christopher Columbus' voyages of 1492 to 1504, in practice the term usually includes the history of Indigenous cultures until Europeans either conquered or significantly influenced them. "Pre-Columbian" is used especially often in the context of discussing the pre-contact Mesoamerican Indigenous societies: Olmec; Toltec; Teotihuacano; Zapotec; Mixtec; Aztec and Maya civilizations; and the complex cultures of the Andes: Inca Empire, Moche culture, Muisca Confederation, and Cañari.

The pre-Columbian era refers to all period subdivisions in the history and prehistory of the Americas before the appearance of significant European and African influences on the American continents, spanning the time of the original arrival in the Upper Paleolithic to European colonization during the early modern period. The Norte Chico civilization (in present-day Peru) is one of the defining six original civilizations of the world, arising independently around the same time as that of Egypt. Many later pre-Columbian civilizations achieved great complexity, with hallmarks that included permanent or urban settlements, agriculture, engineering, astronomy, trade, civic and monumental architecture, and complex societal hierarchies. Some of these civilizations had long faded by the time of the first significant European and African arrivals (ca. late 15th–early 16th centuries), and are known only through oral history and through archaeological investigations. Others were contemporary with the contact and colonization period and were documented in historical accounts of the time. A few, such as the Mayan, Olmec, Mixtec, Aztec, and Nahua peoples, had their written languages and records. However, the European colonists of the time worked to eliminate non-Christian beliefs and burned many pre-Columbian written records. Only a few documents remained hidden and survived, leaving contemporary historians with glimpses of ancient culture and knowledge.

According to both Indigenous and European accounts and documents, American civilizations before and at the time of European encounter had achieved great complexity and many accomplishments. For instance, the Aztecs built one of the largest cities in the world, Tenochtitlan (the historical site of what would become Mexico City), with an estimated population of 200,000 for the city proper and a population of close to five million for the extended empire. By comparison, the largest European cities in the 16th century were Constantinople and Paris with 300,000 and 200,000 inhabitants respectively. The population in London, Madrid, and Rome hardly exceeded 50,000 people. In 1523, right around the time of the Spanish conquest, the entire population in the country of England was just under three million people. This fact speaks to the level of sophistication, agriculture, governmental procedure, and rule of law that existed in Tenochtitlan, needed to govern over such a large citizenry. Indigenous civilizations also displayed impressive accomplishments in astronomy and mathematics. The domestication of maize or corn required thousands of years of selective breeding, and continued cultivation of multiple varieties was done with planning and selection, generally by women.

Inuit, Yupik, Aleut, and Indigenous creation myths tell of a variety of origins of their respective peoples. Some were "always there" or were created by gods or animals, some migrated from a specified compass point, and others came from "across the ocean".

=== European colonization ===
Areas of Indigenous peoples in the Americas at time of European colonization

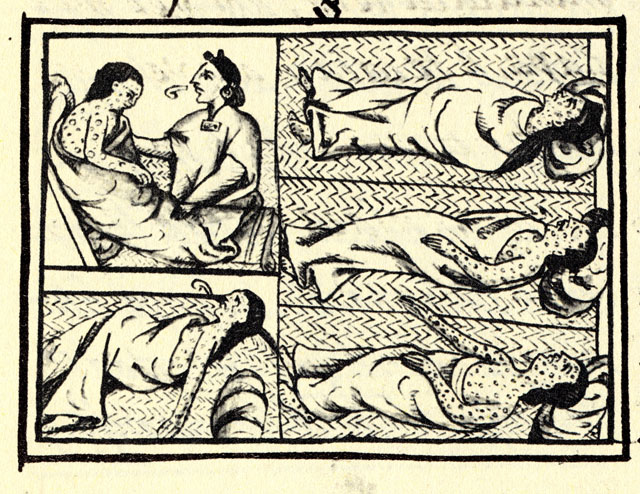
An illustration in Florentine Codex, compiled between 1540 and 1585 CE, depicting the Nahua peoples suffering from smallpox during the conquest-era in central Mexico

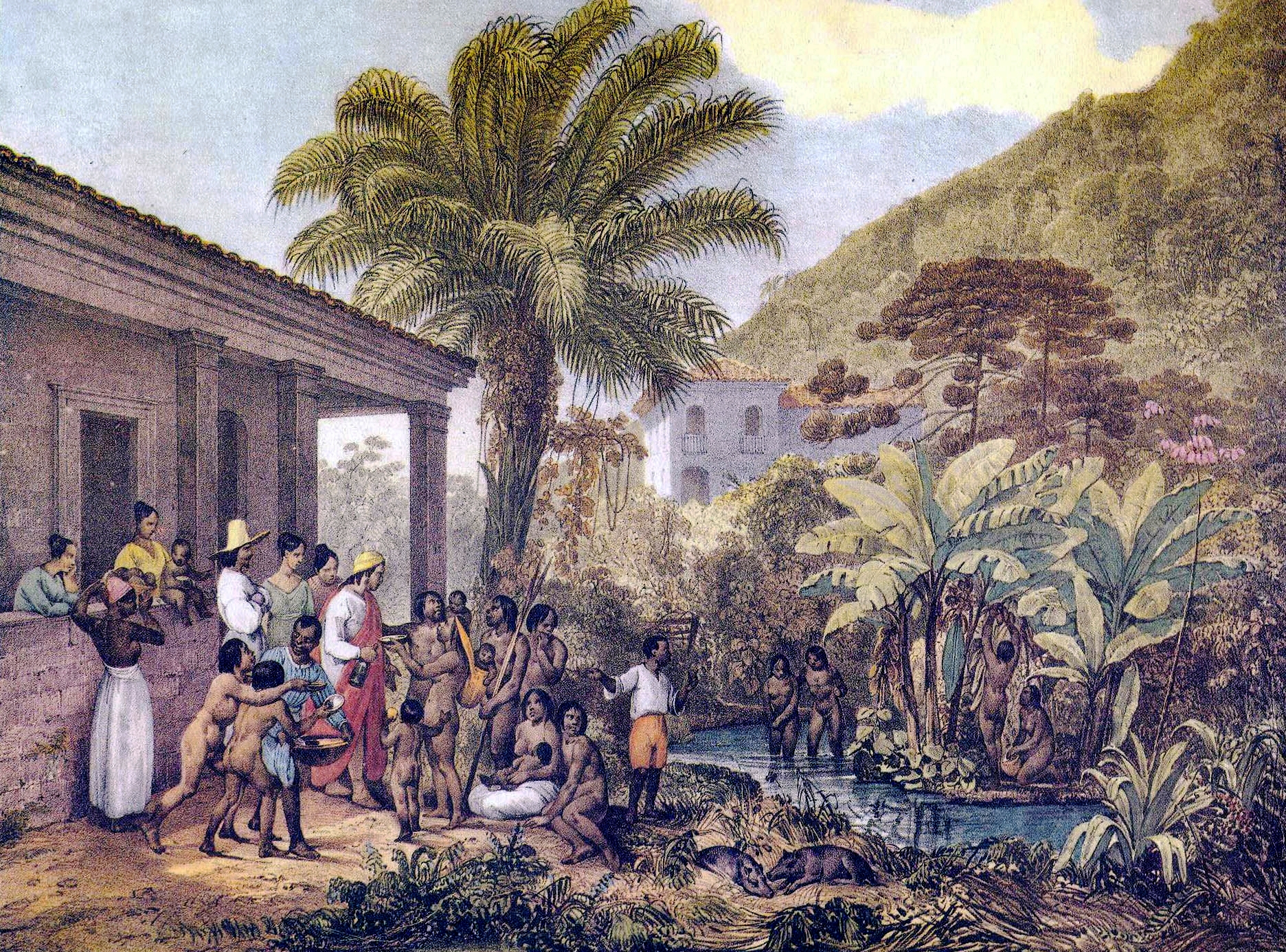
Indigenous people at a farm plantation in Minas Gerais in present-day Brazil, c. 1824

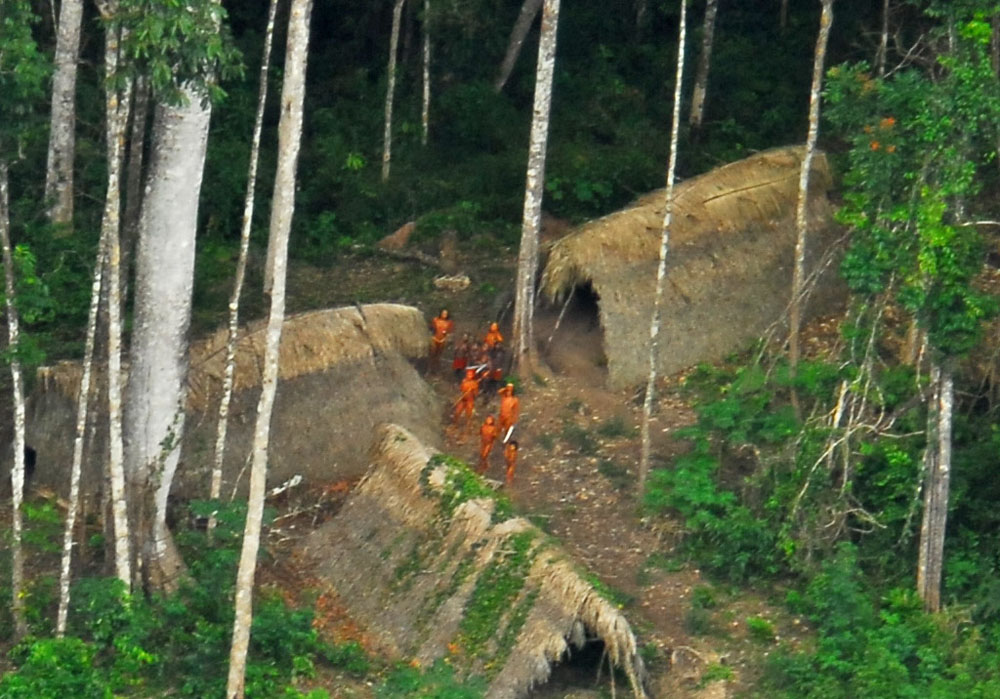
Members of an uncontacted tribe encountered in Acre in Brazil in 2009

The European colonization of the Americas fundamentally changed the lives and cultures of the resident Indigenous peoples. Although the exact pre-colonization population count of the Americas is unknown, scholars estimate that Indigenous populations diminished by between 80% and 90% during the first centuries of European colonization. Most scholars estimate a pre-colonization population of around 50 million, with other scholars arguing for an estimate of 100 million. Estimates reach as high as 145 million. William Denevan estimates of the pre-contact population range from 8 million to 112 million, falling to under 6 million by 1650.

Epidemics ravaged the Americas with diseases, such as smallpox, measles, and cholera, which the early colonists brought from Europe. The spread of infectious diseases was slow initially, as European populations were relatively small. This changed when the Europeans began the trafficking of massive numbers of enslaved Western and Central African people to the Americas, drastically increasing the population. These enslaved Africans carried many of the same diseases as Europeans, such as smallpox, along with many tropical diseases unknown to both the indigenous populations and Europeans. In 1520, an African who had been infected with smallpox had arrived in Yucatán. By 1558, the disease had spread throughout South America and had arrived at the Plata basin. Colonist violence towards Indigenous peoples accelerated the loss of lives. European colonists perpetrated massacres on the Indigenous peoples and enslaved them. According to the U.S. Bureau of the Census (1894), the North American Indian Wars of the 19th century had a known death toll of about 19,000 Europeans and 30,000 Native Americans, and an estimated total death toll of 45,000 Native Americans.

The first Indigenous group encountered by Columbus, the 250,000 Taínos of Hispaniola, represented the dominant culture in the Greater Antilles and the Bahamas. Within thirty years about 70% of the Taínos had died. They had no immunity to European diseases, so outbreaks of measles and smallpox ravaged their population. One such outbreak occurred in a camp of enslaved Africans, where smallpox spread to the nearby Taíno population and reduced their numbers by 50%. Increasing punishment of the Taínos for revolting against forced labor, despite measures put in place by the encomienda, which included religious education and protection from warring tribes, eventually led to the last great Taíno rebellion (1511–1529).

Following years of mistreatment, the Taínos began to adopt suicidal behaviors, with women aborting or killing their infants and men jumping from cliffs or ingesting untreated cassava, a violent poison. Eventually, a Taíno Cacique named Enriquillo managed to hold out in the Baoruco Mountain Range for thirteen years, causing serious damage to the Spanish, Carib-held plantations and their Indian auxiliaries. Hearing of the seriousness of the revolt, Emperor Charles V (also King of Spain) sent Captain Francisco Barrionuevo to negotiate a peace treaty with the ever-increasing number of rebels. Two months later, after consultation with the Audencia of Santo Domingo, Enriquillo was offered any part of the island to live in peace.

The Laws of Burgos, 1512–1513, were the first codified set of laws governing the behavior of Spanish settlers in America, particularly concerning Indigenous peoples. The laws forbade the maltreatment of them and endorsed their conversion to Catholicism. The Spanish crown found it difficult to enforce these laws in distant colonies.

Epidemic disease was the overwhelming cause of the population decline of the Indigenous peoples. After initial contact with Europeans and Africans, Old World diseases caused the deaths of 90 to 95% of the native population of the New World in the following 150 years. Smallpox killed from one-third to half of the native population of Hispaniola in 1518. By killing the Incan ruler Huayna Capac, smallpox caused the Inca Civil War of 1529–1532. Smallpox was only the first epidemic. Typhus (probably) in 1546, influenza and smallpox together in 1558, smallpox again in 1589, diphtheria in 1614, and measles in 1618—all ravaged the remains of Inca culture.

Smallpox killed millions of native inhabitants of Mexico. Unintentionally introduced at Veracruz with the arrival of Pánfilo de Narváez on 23 April 1520, smallpox ravaged Mexico in the 1520s, possibly killing over 150,000 in Tenochtitlán (the heartland of the Aztec Empire) alone, and aiding in the victory of Hernán Cortés over the Aztec Empire at Tenochtitlan (present-day Mexico City) in 1521.

There are many factors as to why Indigenous peoples suffered such immense losses from Afro-Eurasian diseases. Many Old World diseases, like cow pox, are acquired from domesticated animals that are not indigenous to the Americas. European populations had adapted to these diseases, and built up resistance, over many generations. Many of the Old World diseases that were brought over to the Americas were diseases, like yellow fever, that were relatively manageable if infected as a child, but were deadly if infected as an adult. Children could often survive the disease, resulting in immunity to the disease for the rest of their lives. But contact with the disease by adults without this childhood or inherited immunity often proved fatal.

Colonization of the Caribbean led to the destruction of the Arawaks of the Lesser Antilles. Their culture was destroyed by 1650. Only 500 had survived by the year 1550, though the bloodlines continued through to the modern populace. In Amazonia, Indigenous societies weathered centuries of colonization and genocide.

Contact with European diseases such as smallpox and measles killed between 50 and 67 percent of the Indigenous population of North America in the first hundred years after the arrival of Europeans. Some 90 percent of the native population near Massachusetts Bay Colony died of smallpox in an epidemic in 1617–1619. In 1633, in Fort Orange (New Netherland), the Native Americans there were exposed to smallpox because of contact with Europeans. As it had done elsewhere, the virus wiped out entire population groups of Native Americans. It reached Lake Ontario in 1636, and the lands of the Iroquois by 1679. During the 1770s smallpox killed at least 30% of the West Coast Native Americans. The 1775–82 North American smallpox epidemic and the 1837 Great Plains smallpox epidemic brought devastation and drastic population depletion among the Plains Indians. In 1832 the federal government of the United States established a smallpox vaccination program for Native Americans (The Indian Vaccination Act of 1832).

The Indigenous peoples in Brazil declined from a pre-Columbian high of an estimated three million to some 700,000 in 2005

The Spanish Empire and other Europeans re-introduced horses to the Americas. Some of these animals escaped and began to breed and increase their numbers in the wild. The reintroduction of the horse, extinct in the Americas for over 7500 years, had a profound impact on Indigenous cultures in several regions, such as those of the Great Plains, the Northwest Plateau, the Great Basin, Aridoamerica, the Gran Chaco and the Southern Cone. By domesticating horses, some tribes had great success: horses enabled them to expand their territories, exchange more goods with neighboring tribes, and more easily capture game, such as bison.

According to Erin McKenna and Scott L. Pratt, the Indigenous population of the Americas was 145 million in the late 15th and by the late 17th century, had been reduced to 15 million due to epidemics, wars, massacres, mass rapes, starvation, and enslavement.

== Indigenous historical trauma ==
Indigenous historical trauma (IHT) is the trauma that can accumulate across generations and develop as a result of the historical ramifications of colonization and is linked to mental and physical health hardships and population decline. IHT affects many different people in a multitude of ways because the Indigenous community and their history are diverse.

Many studies (such as Whitbeck et al., 2014; Brockie, 2012; Anastasio et al., 2016; Clark & Winterowd, 2012; Tucker et al., 2016) have evaluated the impact of IHT on health outcomes of Indigenous communities from the United States and Canada. IHT is a difficult term to standardize and measure because of the vast and variable diversity of Indigenous people and their communities. Therefore, it is an arduous task to assign an operational definition and systematically collect data when studying IHT. Many of the studies that incorporate IHT measure it in different ways, making it hard to compile data and review it holistically. This is an important point that provides context for the following studies that attempt to understand the relationship between IHT and potential adverse health impacts.

Some of the methodologies to measure IHT include a "Historical Losses Scale" (HLS), "Historical Losses Associated Symptoms Scale" (HLASS), and residential school ancestry studies. HLS uses a survey format that includes "12 kinds of historical losses", such as loss of language and loss of land and asks participants how often they think about those losses. The HLASS includes 12 emotional reactions, and asks participants how they feel when they think about these losses. Lastly, the residential school ancestry studies ask respondents if their parents, grandparents, great-grandparents, or "elders from their community" went to a residential school to understand if family or community history in residential schools is associated with negative health outcomes. In a comprehensive review of the research literature, Joseph Gone and colleagues compiled and compared outcomes for studies using these IHT measures relative to the health outcomes of Indigenous peoples. The study defined negative health outcomes to include such concepts as anxiety, suicidal ideation, suicide attempts, polysubstance abuse, PTSD, depression, binge eating, anger, and sexual abuse.

The connection between IHT and health conditions is complicated because of the difficult nature of measuring IHT, the unknown directionality of IHT and health outcomes, and because the term Indigenous people used in the various samples comprises a huge population of individuals with drastically different experiences and histories. That being said some studies such as Bombay, Matheson, and Anisman (2014), Elias et al. (2012), and Pearce et al. (2008) found that Indigenous respondents with a connection to residential schools have more negative health outcomes (e.g., suicide ideation, suicide attempts, and depression) than those who did not have a connection to residential schools. Additionally, Indigenous respondents with higher HLS and HLASS scores had one or more negative health outcomes. While there are many studies that found an association between IHT and adverse health outcomes, scholars continue to suggest that it remains difficult to understand the impact of IHT. IHT needs to be systematically measured. Indigenous people also need to be understood in separate categories based on similar experiences, location, and background as opposed to being categorized as one monolithic group.

== Agriculture ==
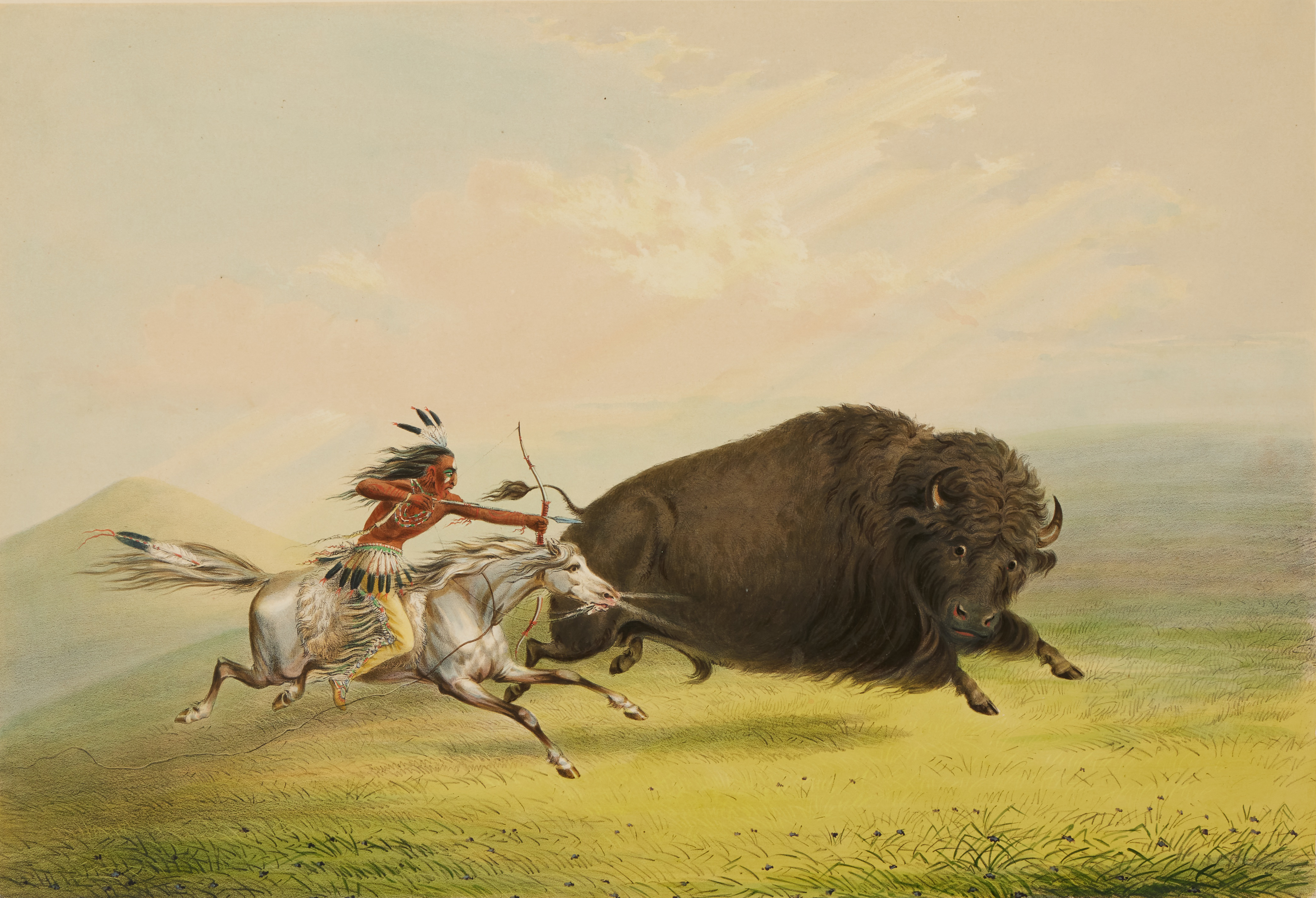
A bison hunt depicted in a painting by George Catlin (1844)

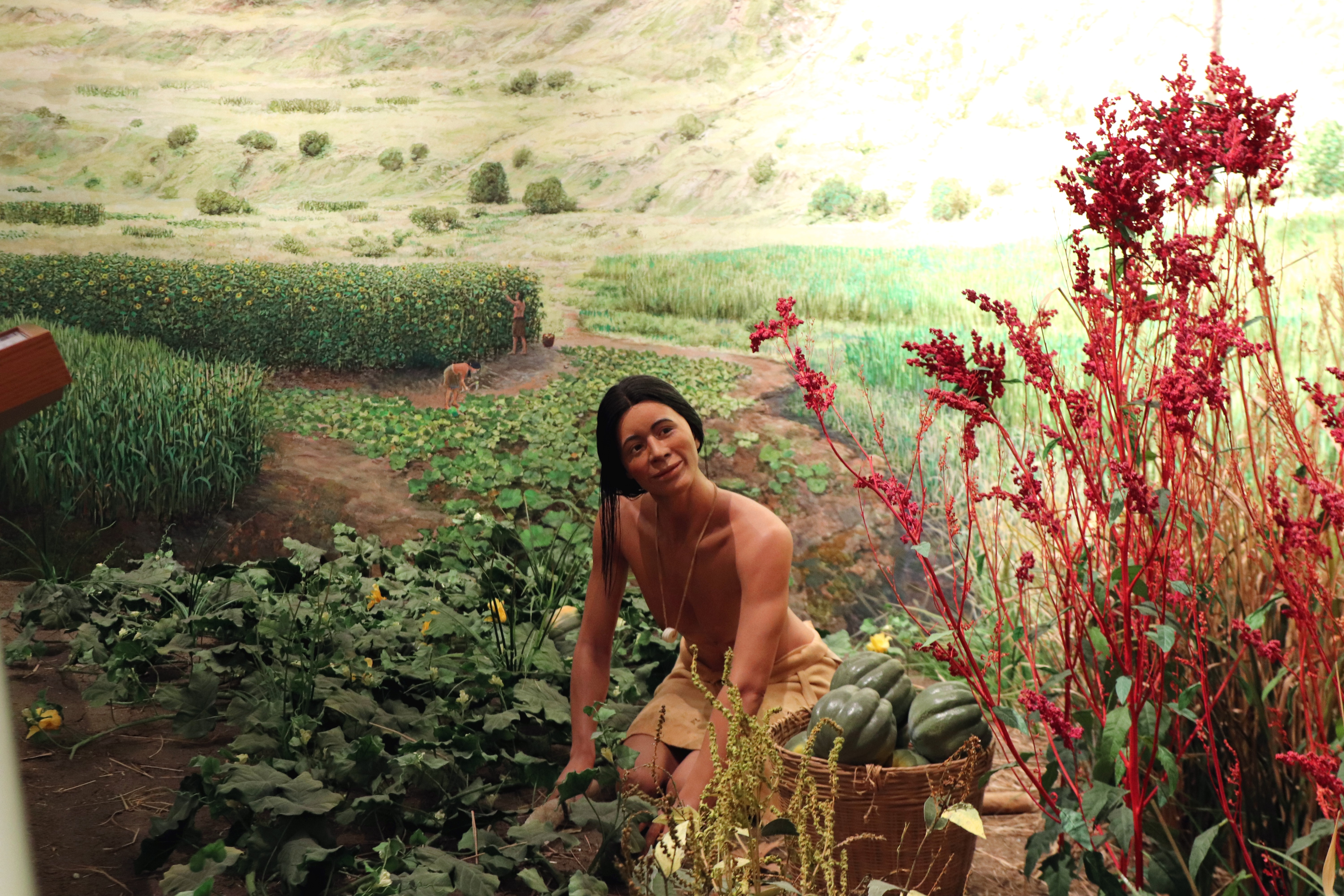
A representation of the domesticated plant species cultivated by Indigenous peoples have influenced the crops that were produced globally.

=== Plants ===
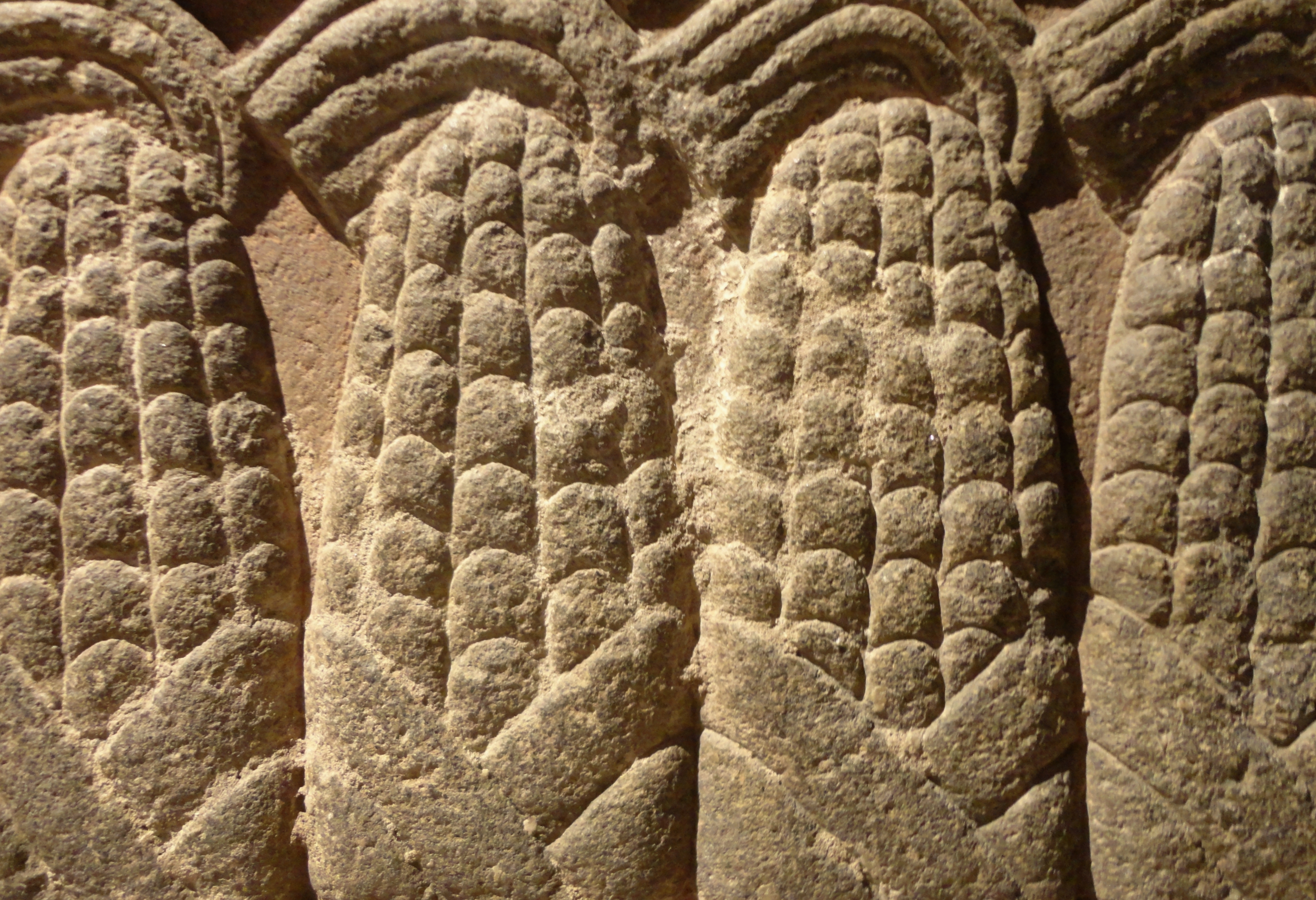
The ancient Mesoamerican engraving of maize now on display at the National Museum of Anthropology in Mexico

For thousands of years, Indigenous peoples domesticated, bred, and cultivated a large array of plant species. These species now constitute between 50% and 60% of all crops in cultivation worldwide. In certain cases, the Indigenous peoples developed entirely new species and strains through artificial selection, as with the domestication and breeding of maize from wild teosinte grasses in the valleys of southern Mexico. Numerous such agricultural products retain their Native names in the English and Spanish lexicons.

The South American highlands became a center of early agriculture. Genetic testing of the wide variety of cultivars and wild species suggests that the potato has a single origin in the area of southern Peru, from a species in the Solanum brevicaule complex. Over 99% of all modern cultivated potatoes worldwide are descendants of a subspecies indigenous to south-central Chile, Solanum tuberosum ssp. tuberosum, where it was cultivated as long as 10,000 years ago. According to Linda Newson, "It is clear that in pre-Columbian times some groups struggled to survive and often suffered food shortages and famines, while others enjoyed a varied and substantial diet."

Persistent drought around AD 850 coincided with the collapse of the Classic Maya civilization, and the famine of One Rabbit (AD 1454) was a major catastrophe in Mexico.

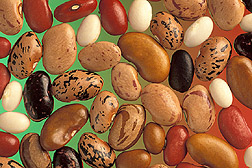
The common bean is native to Mexico and Central America and later began to be cultivated in South America.

Indigenous peoples of North America began practicing farming approximately 4,000 years ago, late in the Archaic period of North American cultures. Technology had advanced to the point where pottery had started to become common and the small-scale felling of trees had become feasible. Concurrently, the Archaic Indigenous peoples began using fire in a controlled manner. They carried out the intentional burning of vegetation to mimic the effects of natural fires that tended to clear forest understories. It made travel easier and facilitated the growth of herbs and berry-producing plants, which were important both for food and for medicines.

In the Mississippi River valley, Europeans noted that Native Americans managed groves of nut and fruit trees not far from villages and towns and their gardens and agricultural fields. They would have used prescribed burning farther away, in forest and prairie areas.

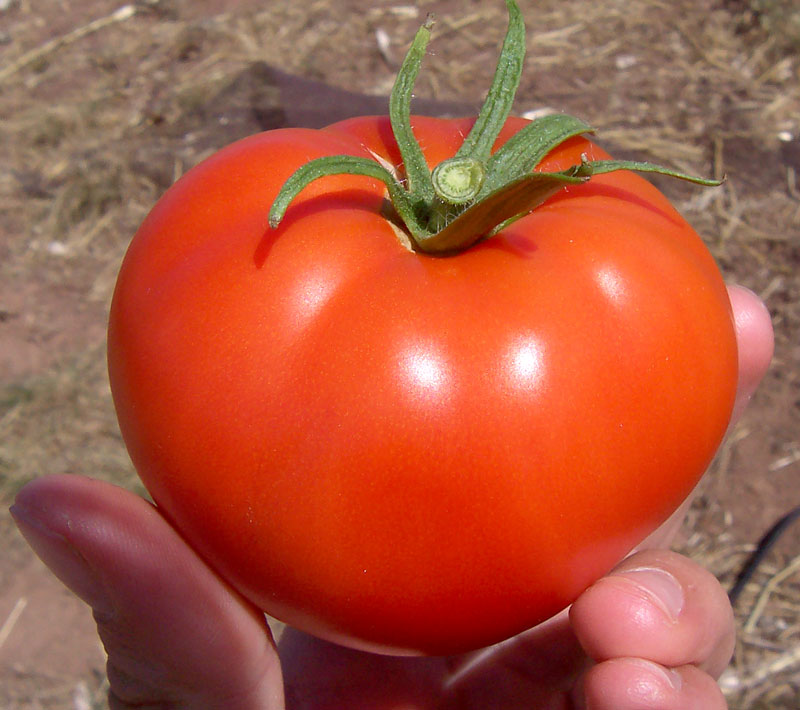
The tomato (jitomate, in central Mexico) was later cultivated by the pre-Hispanic civilizations of Mexico.

Many crops first domesticated by Indigenous peoples are now produced and used globally, most notably maize (or "corn") arguably the most important crop in the world. Other significant crops include cassava; chia; squash (pumpkins, zucchini, marrow, acorn squash, butternut squash); the pinto bean, Phaseolus beans including most common beans, tepary beans, and lima beans; tomatoes; potatoes; sweet potatoes; avocados; peanuts; cocoa beans (used to make chocolate); vanilla; strawberries; pineapples; peppers (species and varieties of Capsicum, including bell peppers, jalapeños, paprika, and chili peppers); sunflower seeds; rubber; brazilwood; chicle; tobacco; coca; blueberries, cranberries, and some species of cotton.

Studies of contemporary Indigenous environmental management—including agro-forestry practices among Itza Maya in Guatemala and hunting and fishing among the Menominee of Wisconsin—suggest that longstanding "sacred values" may represent a summary of sustainable millennial traditions.

=== Animals ===
Numerous Native American dog breeds have been used by the people of the Americas, such as the Canadian Eskimo dog, the Carolina dog, and the Chihuahua. Some Indigenous peoples in the Great Plains used dogs for pulling travois, while others like the Tahltan bear dog were bred to hunt larger game. Some Andean cultures also bred the Chiribaya to herd llamas. The vast majority of indigenous dog breeds in the Americas went extinct, due to being replaced by dogs of European origin.

The Fuegian dog was a domesticated variation of the culpeo that was raised by several cultures in Tierra del Fuego, like the Selkʼnam and the Yahgan. It was exterminated by Argentine and Chilean settlers during the Selknam genocide.

Several bird species, such as turkeys, Muscovy ducks, Puna ibis, and neotropic cormorants were domesticated by various peoples in Mesoamerica and South America to be used for poultry.

In the Andes, Indigenous peoples domesticated llamas and alpacas to produce fiber and meat. The llama was the only beast of burden besides the dog in the Americas before European colonization.

Guinea pigs were domesticated from wild cavies to be raised for meat consumption in the Andean region. Guinea pigs are now widely raised in Western society as household pets.

In Oasisamerica, several cultures raised scarlet macaws imported from Mesoamerica for their feathers.

In the Maya civilization, stingless bees were domesticated to produce balché.

Cochineal were harvested by Mesoamerican and Andean civilizations for coloring fabrics via carminic acid.

== Culture ==
Cultural practices in the Americas seem to have been shared mostly within geographical zones where distinct ethnic groups adopt shared cultural traits, similar technologies, and social organizations. An example of such a cultural area is Mesoamerica, where millennia of coexistence and shared development among the peoples of the region produced a fairly homogeneous culture with complex agricultural and social patterns. Another well-known example is the North American plains where until the 19th century several peoples shared the traits of nomadic hunter-gatherers based primarily on bison hunting.

=== Languages ===
Pre-contact distribution of North American language families

Pre-contact distribution of native American languages in the Southwest US, Mexico, and Central America

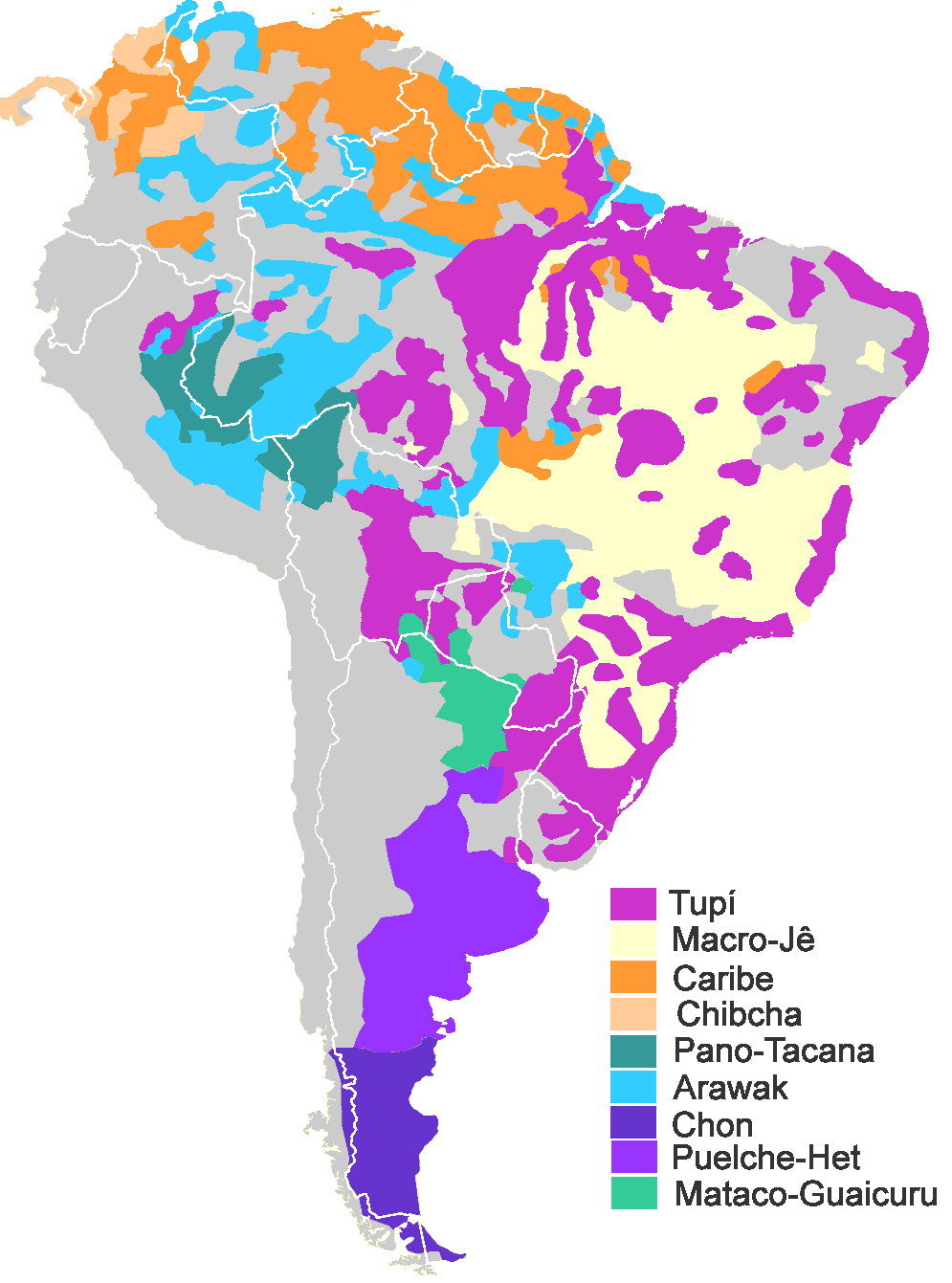
The major indigenous language families of South America, except Quechuan, Aymaran, and Mapuche

Indigenous languages in North America have been classified into 56 groups or stock tongues, in which the spoken languages of the various nations may be said to center. In connection with speech, reference may be made to gesture language which was highly developed in parts of this area. Of equal interest is the picture writing especially well developed among the Anishinaabe and Lenape nations.

=== Writing systems ===
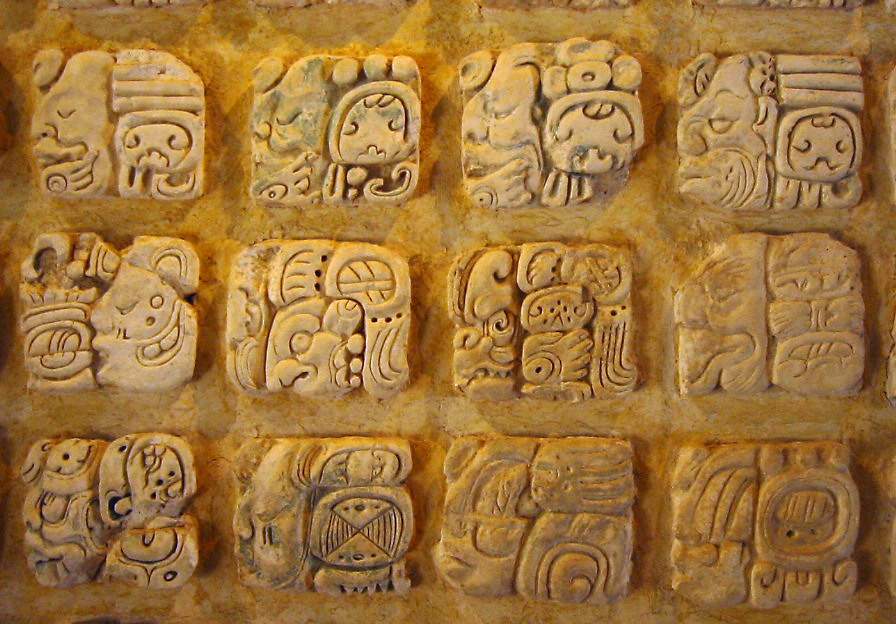
Maya glyphs in stucco now on display at Museo de sitio in Palenque, Mexico

Beginning in the 1st millennium BCE, pre-Columbian cultures in Mesoamerica developed several Indigenous writing systems (independent of any influence from the writing systems that existed in other parts of the world). The Cascajal Block is perhaps the earliest-known example in the Americas of what may be an extensive written text. The Olmec hieroglyphs tablet has been indirectly dated (from ceramic shards found in the same context) to approximately 900 BCE which is around the same time that the Olmec occupation of San Lorenzo Tenochtitlán began to weaken.

The Maya writing system was logosyllabic (a combination of phonetic syllabic symbols and logograms). It is the only pre-Columbian writing system known to have completely represented the spoken language of its community. It has more than a thousand different glyphs, but a few are variations on the same sign or have the same meaning, many appear only rarely or in particular localities, no more than about five hundred were in use in any given time, and, of those, it seems only about two hundred (including variations) represented a particular phoneme or syllable.

The Zapotec writing system, one of the earliest in the Americas, was logographic and presumably syllabic. There are remnants of Zapotec writing in inscriptions on some of the monumental architecture of the period, but so few inscriptions are extant that it is difficult to fully describe the writing system. The oldest example of the Zapotec script, dating from around 600 BCE, is on a monument that was discovered in San José Mogote.

Aztec codices (singular codex) are books that were written by pre-Columbian and colonial-era Aztecs. These codices are some of the best primary sources for descriptions of Aztec culture. The pre-Columbian codices are largely pictorial; they do not contain symbols that represent spoken or written language. By contrast, colonial-era codices contain not only Aztec pictograms, but also writing that uses the Latin alphabet in several languages: Classical Nahuatl, Spanish, and occasionally Latin.

Spanish mendicants in the sixteenth century taught Indigenous scribes in their communities to write their languages using Latin letters, and there are a large number of local-level documents in Nahuatl, Zapotec, Mixtec, and Yucatec Maya from the colonial era, many of which were part of lawsuits and other legal matters. Although Spaniards initially taught Indigenous scribes alphabetic writing, the tradition became self-perpetuating at the local level. The Spanish crown gathered such documentation, and contemporary Spanish translations were made for legal cases. Scholars have translated and analyzed these documents in what is called the New Philology to write histories of Indigenous peoples from Indigenous viewpoints.

The Wiigwaasabak, birch bark scrolls on which the Ojibwa, an Anishinaabe) people, wrote complex geometrical patterns and shapes, can also be considered a form of writing, as can Mi'kmaq hieroglyphics.

Aboriginal syllabic writing, or simply syllabics, is a family of abugidas used to write some Indigenous languages of the Algonquian, Inuit, and Athabaskan language families.

=== Music and art ===
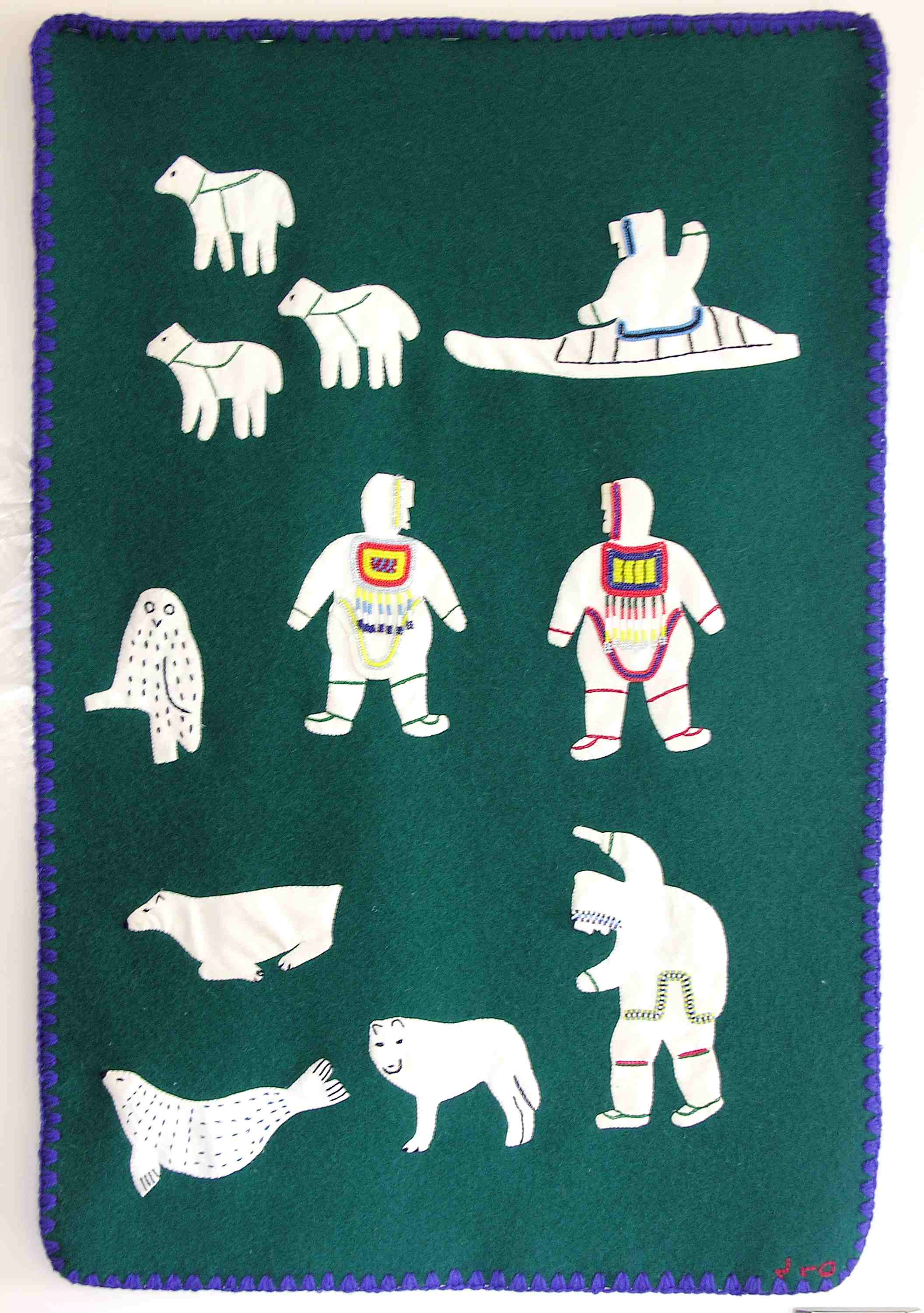
Indigenous peoples textile art in 1995 by Julia Pingushat, including Inuk, Arviat, Nunavut, Canada, wool, and embroidery floss

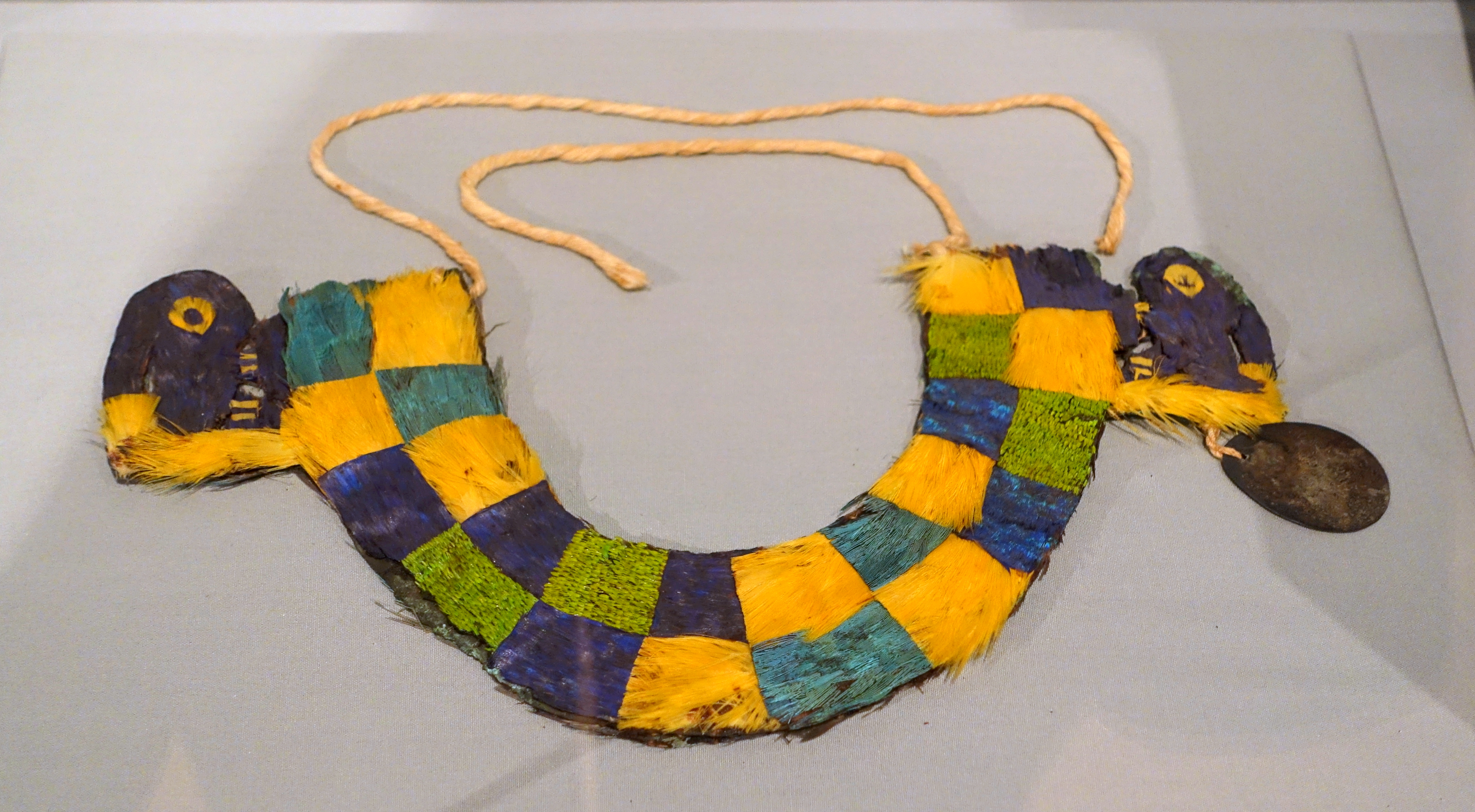
Chimu culture feather pectoral, feathers, reed, copper, silver, hide, cordage, c. 1350–1450

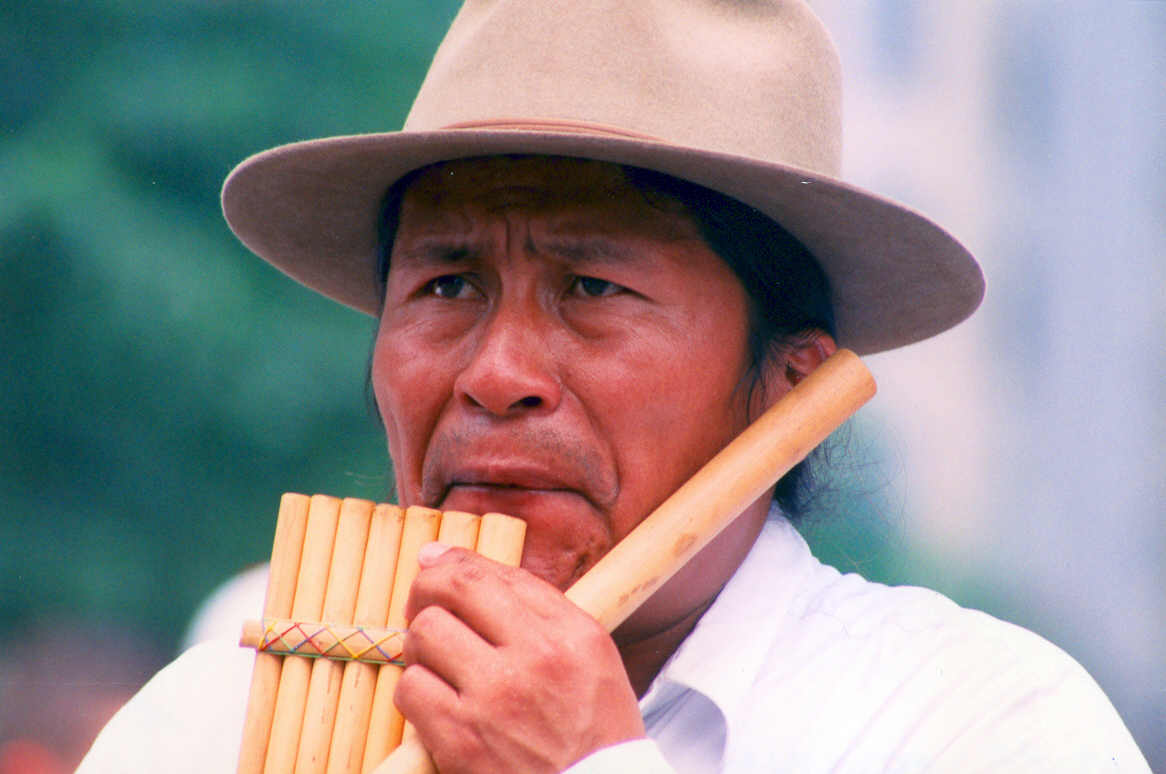
An Indigenous man playing a panpipe, antara, or siku

Indigenous music can vary between cultures, however, there are significant commonalities. Traditional music often centers around drumming and singing. Rattles, clapper sticks, and rasps are also popular percussive instruments, both historically and in contemporary cultures. Flutes are made of river cane, cedar, and other woods. The Apache have a type of fiddle, and fiddles are also found many First Nations and Métis cultures.

The music of the Indigenous peoples of Central Mexico and Central America, like that of the North American cultures, tends to be spiritual ceremonies. It traditionally includes a large variety of percussion and wind instruments such as drums, flutes, sea shells (used as trumpets), and "rain" tubes. No remnants of pre-Columbian stringed instruments were found until archaeologists discovered a jar in Guatemala, attributed to the Maya of the Late Classic Era (600–900 CE); this jar was decorated with imagery depicting a stringed musical instrument, which has since been reproduced. This instrument is one of the very few stringed instruments known in the Americas before the introduction of European musical instruments; when played, it produces a sound that mimics a jaguar's growl.

Visual arts by Indigenous peoples of the Americas comprise a major category in the world art collection. Contributions include pottery, paintings, jewelry, weavings, sculptures, basketry, carvings, and beadwork. Because too many artists were posing as Native Americans and Alaska Natives to profit from the cachet of Indigenous art in the United States, the U.S. passed the Indian Arts and Crafts Act of 1990, requiring artists to prove that they were enrolled in a state or federally recognized tribe. To support the ongoing practice of American Indian, Alaska Native, and Native Hawaiian arts and cultures in the United States, the Ford Foundation, arts advocates, and American Indian tribes created an endowment seed fund and established a national Native Arts and Cultures Foundation in 2007.

After the entry of the Spaniards, the process of spiritual conquest was favored, among other things, by the liturgical musical service to which the natives, whose musical gifts came to surprise the missionaries, were integrated. The musical gifts of the natives were of such magnitude that they soon learned the rules of counterpoint and polyphony and even the virtuous handling of the instruments. This helped to ensure that it was not necessary to bring more musicians from Spain, which significantly annoyed the clergy.

The solution that was proposed was not to employ but a certain number of Indigenous people in the musical service, not to teach them counterpoint, not to allow them to play certain instruments (brass breaths, for example, in Oaxaca, Mexico) and, finally, not to import more instruments so that the Indigenous people would not have access to them. The latter was not an obstacle to the musical enjoyment of the natives, who experienced the making of instruments, particularly rubbed strings (violins and double basses) or plucked (third). It is there where we can find the origin of what is now called traditional music whose instruments have their tuning and a typical Western structure.

== History and status by continent and country ==
=== North America ===
==== Canada ====
A map of Canada showing the percent of self-reported Indigenous identity (First Nations, Inuit, Métis) by census division, according to the 2021 Canadian census

In Canada, Indigenous peoples (also known as Aboriginal Canadians) represent roughly 5% of the overall population. They comprise the Inuit, Métis, and First Nations, of which there are over 600 recognized First Nations governments or bands with distinctive cultures, languages, music and arts.

Old Crow Flats and Bluefish Caves are some of the earliest known sites of human habitation in Canada. The characteristics of Indigenous cultures in Canada prior to European colonization included permanent settlements, possibly agriculture, civic and ceremonial architecture, complex societal hierarchies, and trading networks. Métis nations of mixed ancestry originated in the mid-17th century when First Nations and Inuit married Europeans, primarily French settlers. First Nations and Métis peoples played a critical part in the development of European colonies in Canada, particularly for their role in assisting Europeans during the North American fur trade.

Various Aboriginal laws, treaties, and legislation have been enacted between European immigrants and Indigenous groups across Canada. The impact of settler colonialism in Canada can be seen in its culture, history, politics, laws, and legislatures. Historically, this included assimilationist policies affecting Indigenous languages, traditions, religion and the degradation of Indigenous communities that has contemporarily been described by some, including academics and politicians, as a cultural genocide or genocide.

The modern Indigenous right to self-government provides for Indigenous self-government in Canada and the management of cultural, political, health and economic responsibilities within Indigenous communities. National Indigenous Peoples Day recognizes the vast cultures and contributions of Indigenous peoples to the history of Canada. First Nations, Inuit, and Métis peoples of all backgrounds have become prominent figures in Canada and have helped shape the Canadian cultural identity.

==== Greenland ====
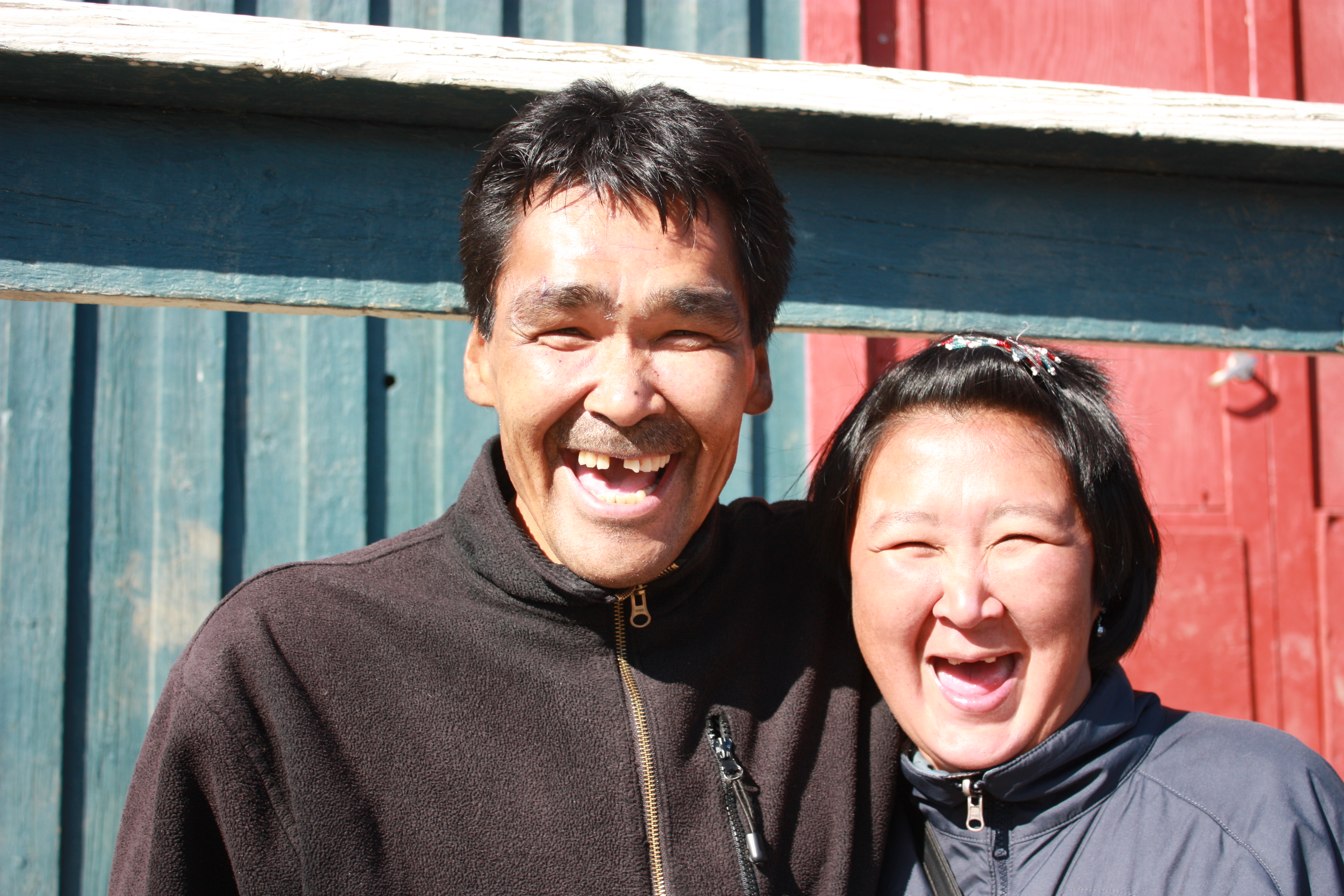
Tunumiit Inuit couple from Kulusuk, Greenland

The Greenlandic Inuit (Kalaallisut: kalaallit, Tunumiisut: tunumiit, Inuktun: inughuit) are the Indigenous and most populous ethnic group in Greenland. This means that Denmark has one officially recognized Indigenous group. the Inuit – the Greenlandic Inuit of Greenland and the Greenlandic people in Denmark (Inuit residing in Denmark).

Approximately 89 percent of Greenland's population of 57,695 is Greenlandic Inuit, or 51,349 people as of 2012. Ethnographically, they consist of three major groups:

- the Kalaallit of west Greenland, who speak Kalaallisut
- the Tunumiit of Tunu (east Greenland), who speak Tunumiit oraasiat ("East Greenlandic")
- the Inughuit of north Greenland, who speak Inuktun ("Polar Inuit")

==== Mexico ====
Proportion of Native Mexicans in each municipalities in 2020.

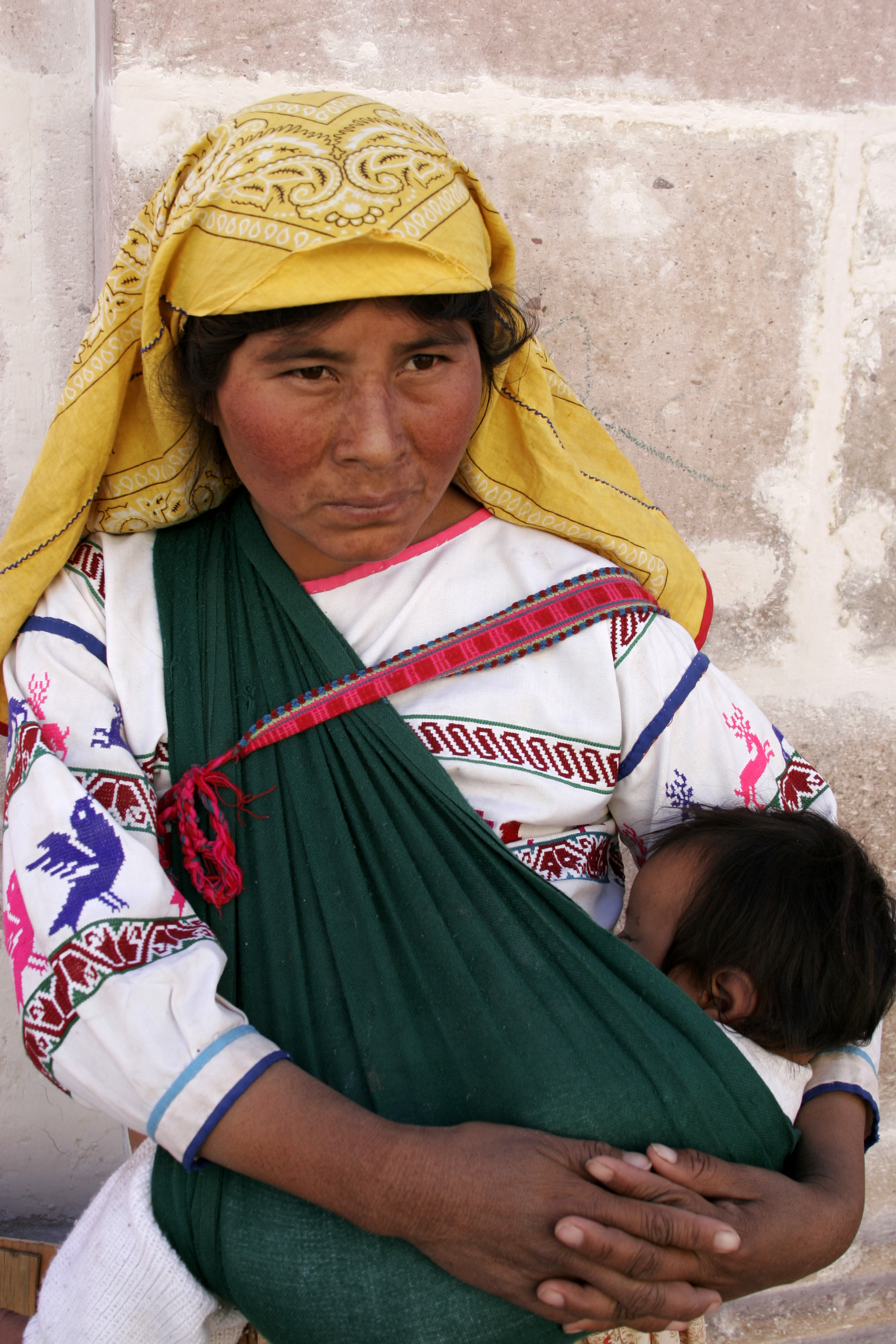
A Huichol woman from Zacatecas, Mexico

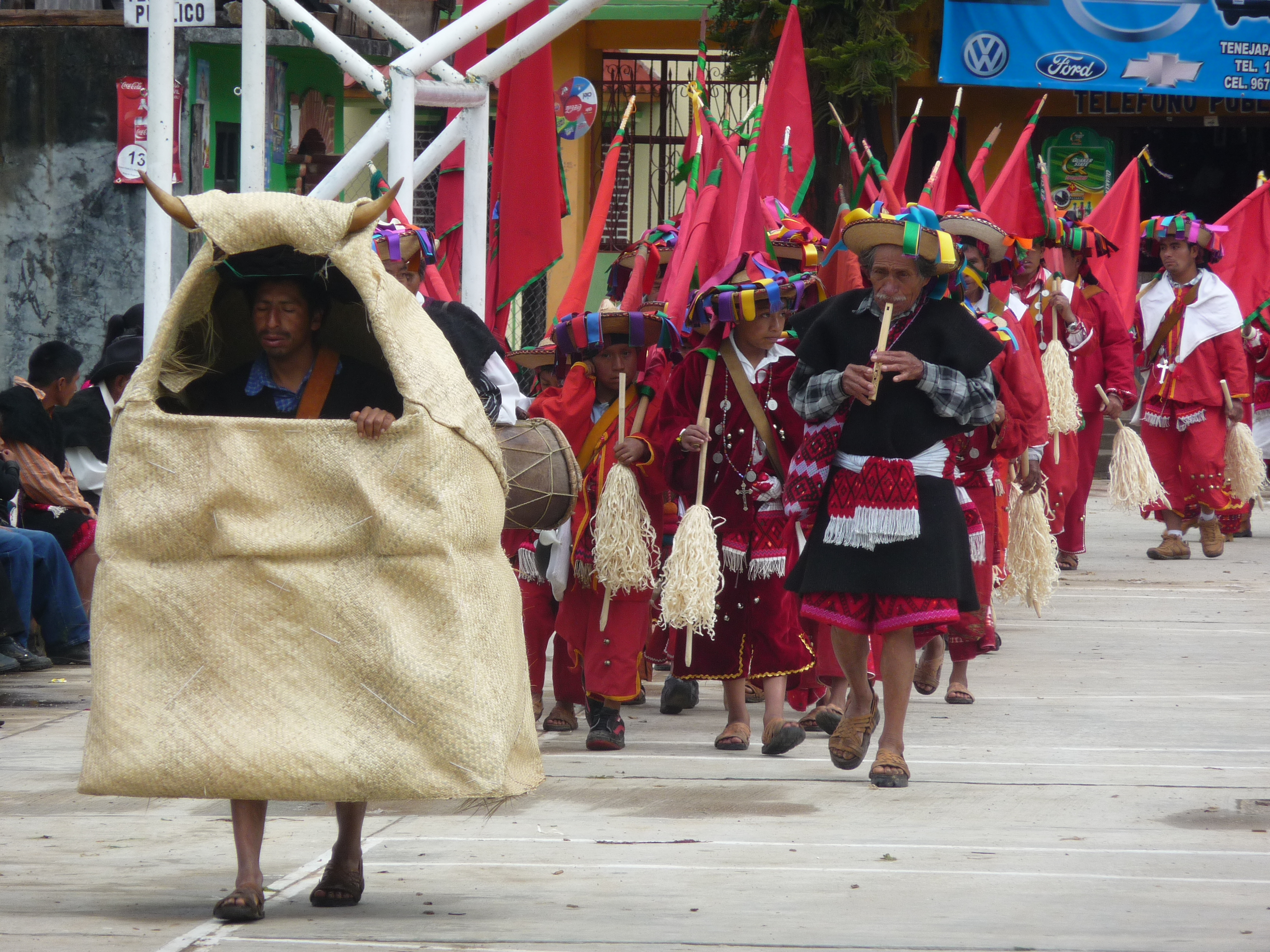
A carnival with Tzeltal people in Tenejapa Municipality, Chiapas

The territory of modern-day Mexico was home to numerous Indigenous civilizations before the arrival of the Spanish conquistadores: The Olmecs, who flourished from between 1200 BCE to about 400 BCE in the coastal regions of the Gulf of Mexico; the Zapotecs and the Mixtecs, who held sway in the mountains of Oaxaca and the Isthmus of Tehuantepec; the Maya in the Yucatán (and into neighboring areas of contemporary Central America); the Purépecha in present-day Michoacán and surrounding areas, and the Aztecs/Mexica, who, from their central capital at Tenochtitlan, dominated much of the center and south of the country (and the non-Aztec inhabitants of those areas) when Hernán Cortés first landed at Veracruz.

In contrast to what was the general rule in the rest of North America, the history of the colony of New Spain was one of racial intermingling (mestizaje). Mestizos, which in Mexico designate people who do not identify culturally with any Indigenous grouping, quickly came to account for a majority of the colony's population. Today, Mestizos in Mexico of mixed Indigenous and European ancestry (with a minor African contribution) are still a majority of the population. Genetic studies vary over whether Indigenous or European ancestry predominates in the Mexican Mestizo population. In the 2020 INEGI census, 23.2 million people (19.4% of the Mexican population aged 3 years and older) self-identified as Indigenous. Somewhat contradictorily, in the same 2020 census, 11.8 million people (9.3% of the Mexican population) were determined to be Indigenous by the Mexican government based on the language spoken in their households. The Indigenous population is distributed throughout the territory of Mexico but is especially concentrated in the Sierra Madre del Sur, the Yucatán Peninsula, and the most remote and difficult-to-access areas, such as the Sierra Madre Oriental, the Sierra Madre Occidental, and neighboring areas. The CDI identifies 62 Indigenous groups in Mexico, each with a unique language.

In the states of Chiapas and Oaxaca and the interior of the Yucatán Peninsula, a large amount of the population is of Indigenous descent with the largest ethnic group being Maya with a population of 900,000. Large Indigenous minorities, including Aztecs or Nahua, Purépechas, Mazahua, Otomi, and Mixtecs are also present in the central regions of Mexico. In the northern, western and Bajio regions of Mexico, Indigenous people are a small minority.

The General Law of Linguistic Rights of the Indigenous Peoples grants all Indigenous languages spoken in Mexico, regardless of the number of speakers, the same validity as Spanish in all territories in which they are spoken, and Indigenous peoples are entitled to request some public services and documents in their native languages. Along with Spanish, the law has granted them—more than 60 languages—the status of "national languages". The law includes all Indigenous languages of the Americas regardless of origin; that is, it includes Indigenous languages of ethnic groups non-native to the territory. The National Commission for the Development of Indigenous Peoples recognizes the language of the Kickapoo, who immigrated from the United States and recognizes the languages of the Indigenous refugees from Guatemala. The Mexican government has promoted and established bilingual primary and secondary education in some Indigenous rural communities. Nonetheless, of the Indigenous peoples in Mexico, 93% are either native speakers or bilingual second-language speakers of Spanish with only about 62.4% of them (or 5.4% of the country's population) speaking an Indigenous language and about a sixth do not speak Spanish (0.7% of the country's population).

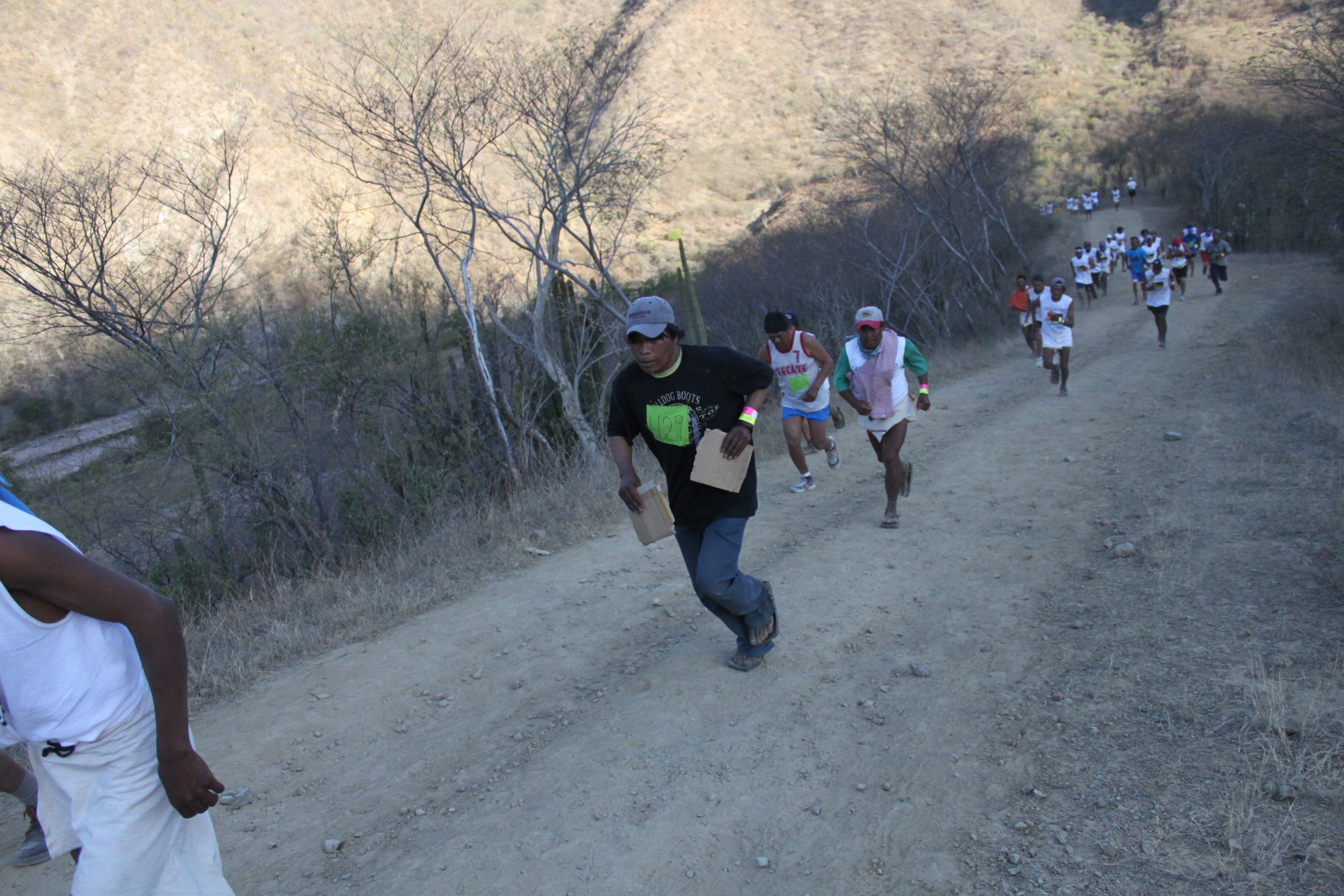
The Rarámuri marathon in Urique

The Indigenous peoples in Mexico have the right of free determination under the second article of the constitution. According to this article, the Indigenous peoples are granted:

- the right to decide the internal forms of social, economic, political, and cultural organization;
- the right to apply their normative systems of regulation as long as human rights and gender equality are respected;
- the right to preserve and enrich their languages and cultures;
- the right to elect representatives before the municipal council in which their territories are located;

amongst other rights.

==== United States ====
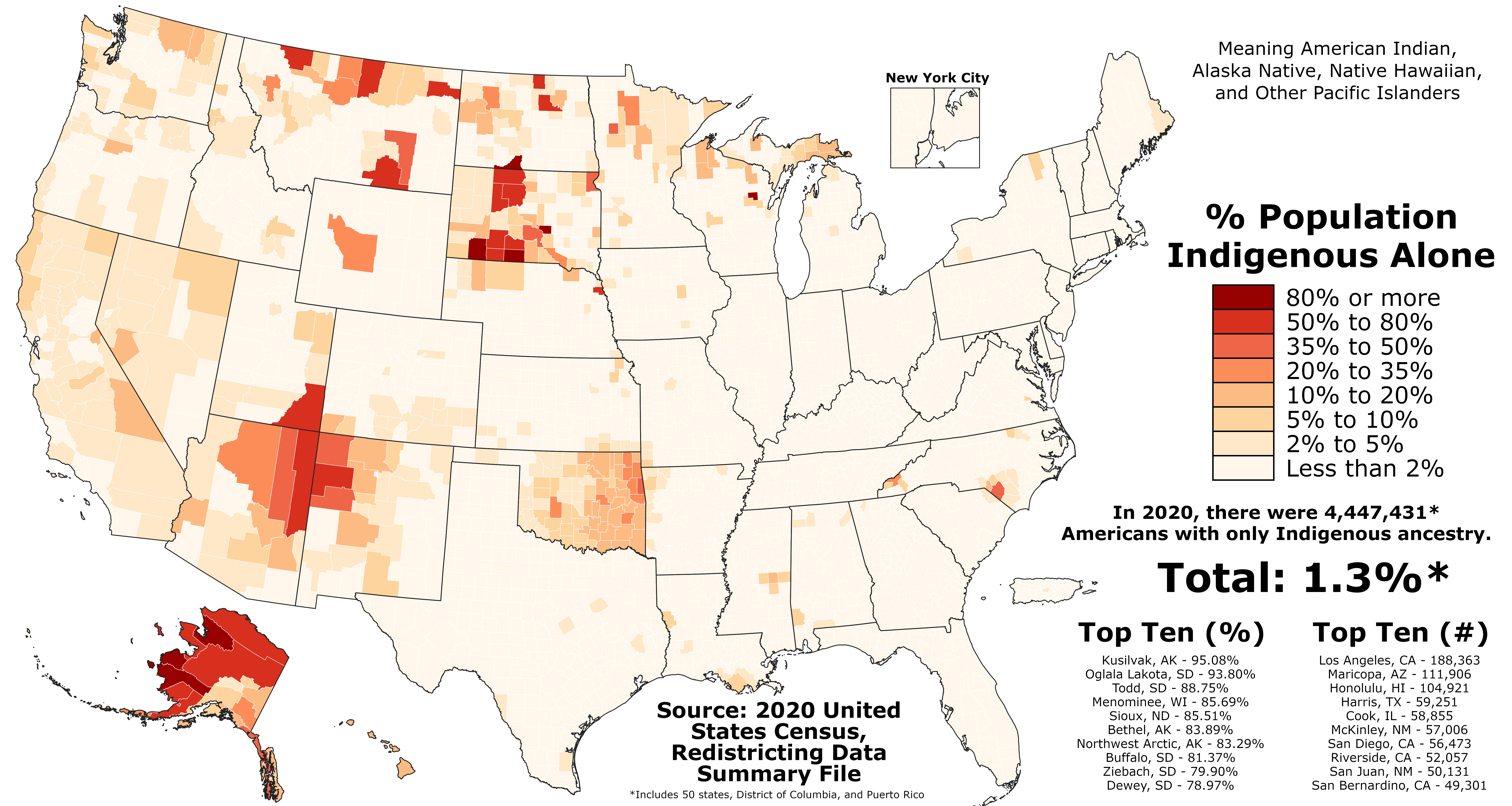
Proportion of Native Americans in each county in 2020.

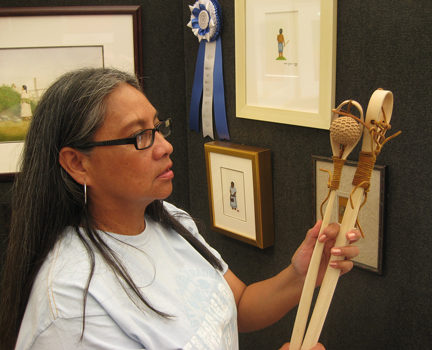
A Choctaw artist in present-day Oklahoma

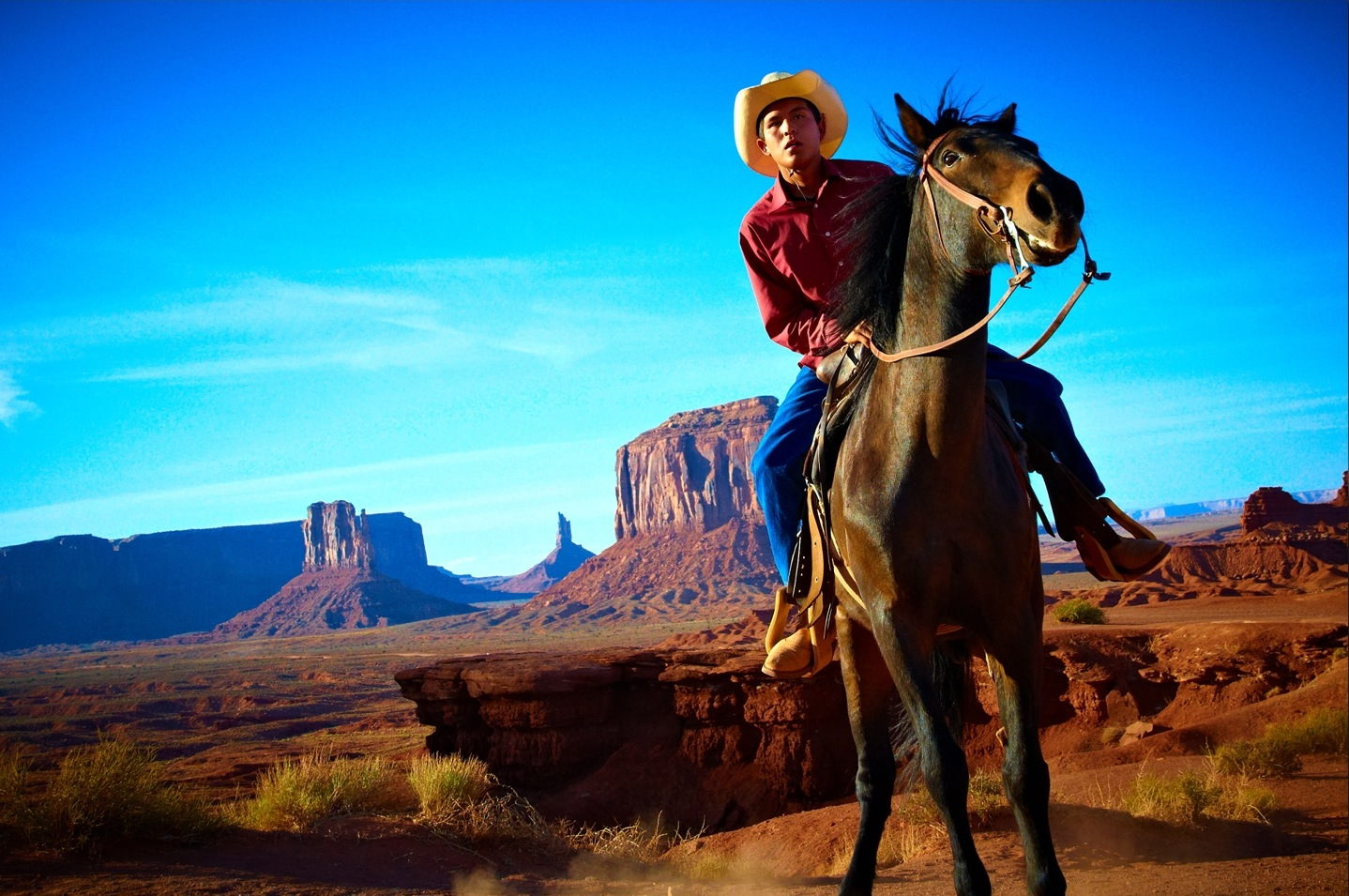
A Navajo man on horseback in present-day Monument Valley in Arizona

Indigenous peoples in what is now the contiguous United States, including their descendants, were commonly called American Indians, or simply Indians domestically and since the late 20th century the term Native American came into common use. In Alaska, Indigenous peoples belong to 11 cultures with 11 languages. These include the St. Lawrence Island Yupik, Iñupiat, Athabaskan, Yup'ik, Cup'ik, Unangax, Alutiiq, Eyak, Haida, Tsimshian, and Tlingit, and are collectively called Alaska Natives. They include Native American peoples as well as Inuit, who are distinct but occupy areas of the region.

The United States has authority over Indigenous Polynesian people, which include Hawaiians, Marshallese (Micronesian), and Samoan; politically they are classified as Pacific Islander Americans. They are geographically, genetically, and culturally distinct from Indigenous peoples of the mainland continents of the Americas.

In the 2020 census 2.9% of the U.S. population claimed to have some degree of Native American heritage. When answering a question about racial background, 3.7 million people identified solely as "American Indian or Alaska Native", while another 5.9 million did so in combination with other races. Aztecs were the largest single Native American group in the 2020 census, while Cherokee was the largest group in combination with any other race. Tribes have established their criteria for membership, which are often based on blood quantum, lineal descent, or residency. A minority of Native Americans live in land units called Indian reservations.

Some California and Southwestern tribes, such as the Kumeyaay, Cocopa, Pascua Yaqui, Tohono O'odham, and Apache, span both sides of the US–Mexican border. By treaty, Haudenosaunee people have the legal right to freely cross the US–Canada border. Athabascan, Tlingit, Haida, Tsimshian, Iñupiat, Blackfeet, Nakota, Cree, Anishinaabe, Huron, Lenape, Mi'kmaq, Penobscot, and Haudenosaunee, among others, live in both Canada and the United States, whose international border intersects their common cultural territory.

=== Central America ===
==== Belize ====
Mestizos (mixed European-Indigenous) number about 51% of the population; unmixed Maya make up another 11% (Kekchi, Mopan, and Yucatec). The Garifuna, who came to Belize in the 19th century from Saint Vincent and the Grenadines, have mixed African, Kalinago, and Arawak ancestry and make up another 4% of the population.

==== Costa Rica ====
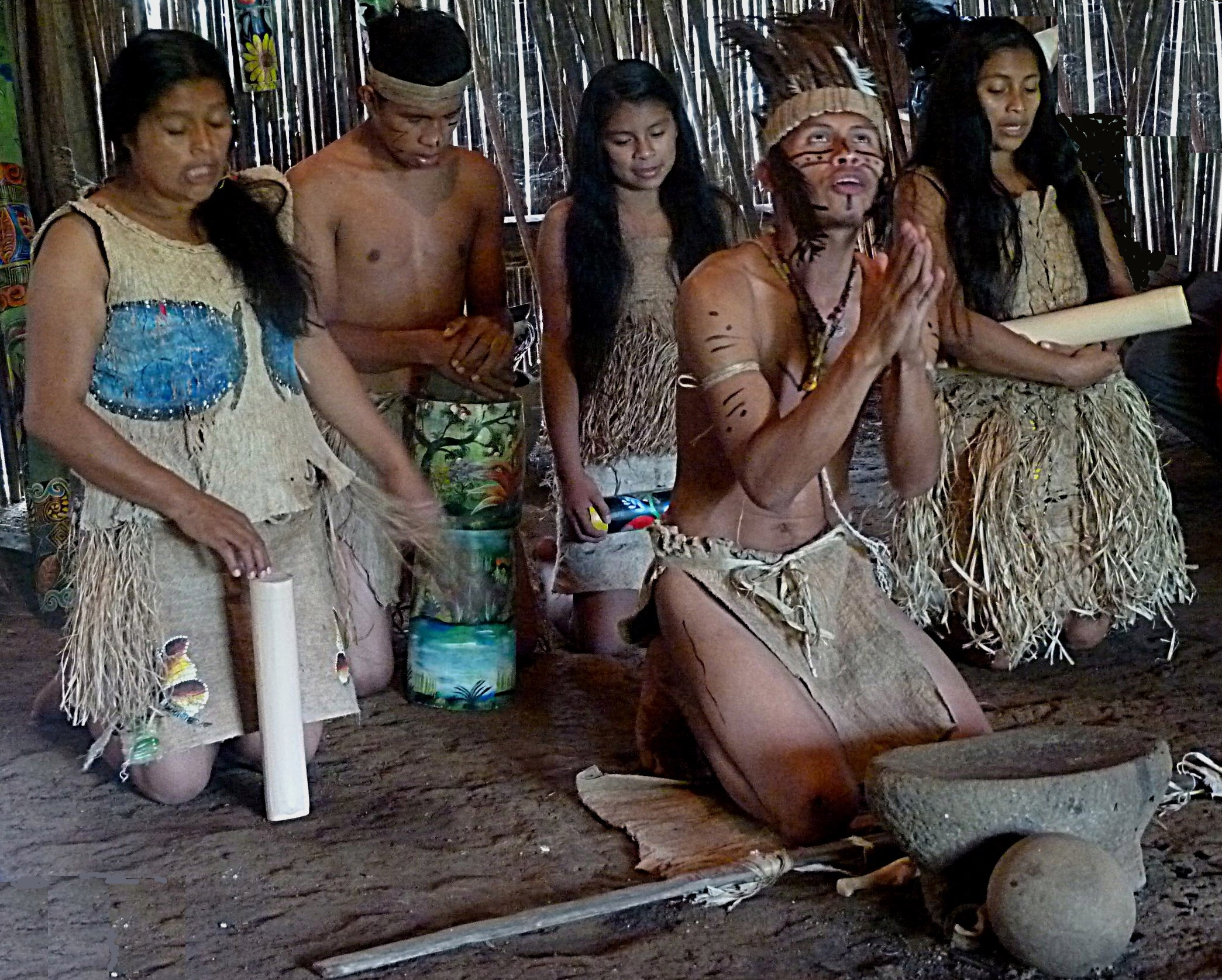
Indigenous Maleku people in Costa Rica

There are over 114,000 inhabitants of Native American origins, representing 2.4% of the population. Most of them live in secluded reservations, distributed among eight ethnic groups: Quitirrisí (In the Central Valley), Matambú or Chorotega (Guanacaste), Maleku (Northern Alajuela), Bribri (Southern Atlantic), Cabécar (Cordillera de Talamanca), Boruca (Southern Costa Rica) and Ngäbe (Southern Costa Rica along the Panamá border).

These native groups are characterized by their work in wood, like masks, drums, and other artistic figures, as well as fabrics made of cotton.

==== El Salvador ====
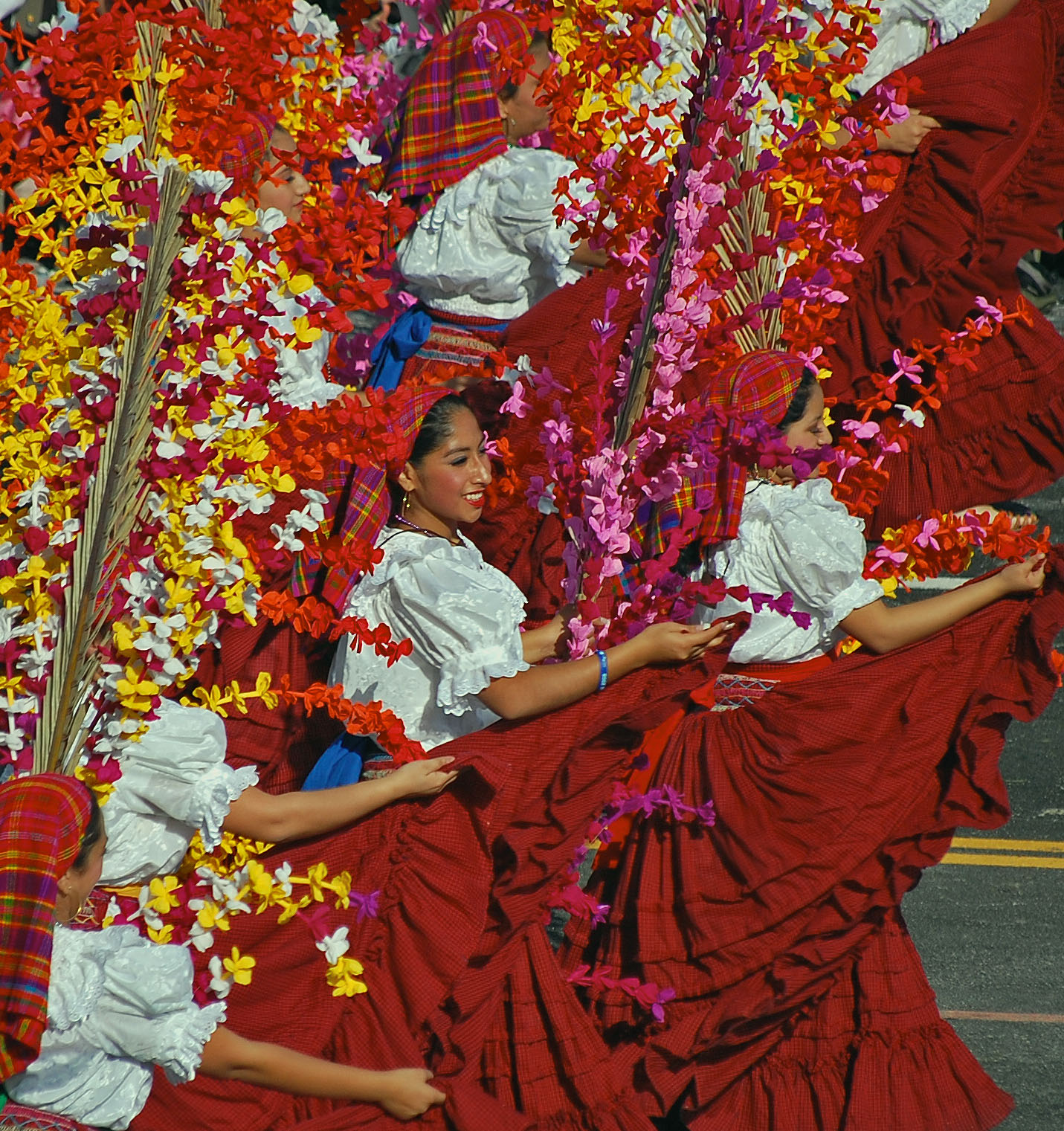
Indigenous Pipil women dancing in the traditional Procession of Palms in Panchimalco, El Salvador

Estimates for El Salvador's Indigenous population vary. The 2024 census found that 1.2% of the population, or 68,148 people identified as Indigenous. Historically, estimates have claimed higher amounts. A 1930 census stated that 5.6% were Indigenous. By the mid-20th century, there may have been as much as 20% (or 400,000) that would qualify as "Indigenous". Another estimate stated that by the late 1980s, 10% of the population was Indigenous, and another 89% was mestizo (or people of mixed European and Indigenous ancestry).

Much of El Salvador was home to various Indigenous groups like the Pipil, the Lenca, Mayas (Chorti and Poqomam), Chorotegas, and Xincas. The Pipil lived in western El Salvador, spoke Nawat, and had many settlements there, most notably Cuzcatlan. The Pipil had no precious mineral resources, but they did have rich and fertile land that was good for farming. The Spaniards were disappointed not to find gold or jewels in El Salvador as they had in other lands like Guatemala or Mexico, but upon learning of the fertile land in El Salvador, they attempted to conquer it. Noted Mesoamerican Indigenous warriors who rose against the Spanish included Princess Atonal and Atlacatl of the Pipil people in central El Salvador, and Princess Antu Silan Ulap of the Lenca people in eastern El Salvador, who saw the Spanish not as gods but as barbaric invaders. After fierce battles, the Pipil successfully fought off the Spanish army led by Pedro de Alvarado along with their Indigenous allies (the Tlaxcalas), sending them back to Guatemala. After many other attacks with an army reinforced with Indigenous allies, the Spanish were able to conquer Cuzcatlan. After further attacks, the Spanish also conquered the Lenca people. Eventually, the Spaniards intermarried with Pipil and Lenca women, resulting in the mestizo population that would make up the vast majority of the Salvadoran people. Today many Pipil and other Indigenous populations live in the many small towns of El Salvador like Izalco, Panchimalco, Sacacoyo, and Nahuizalco.

==== Guatemala ====
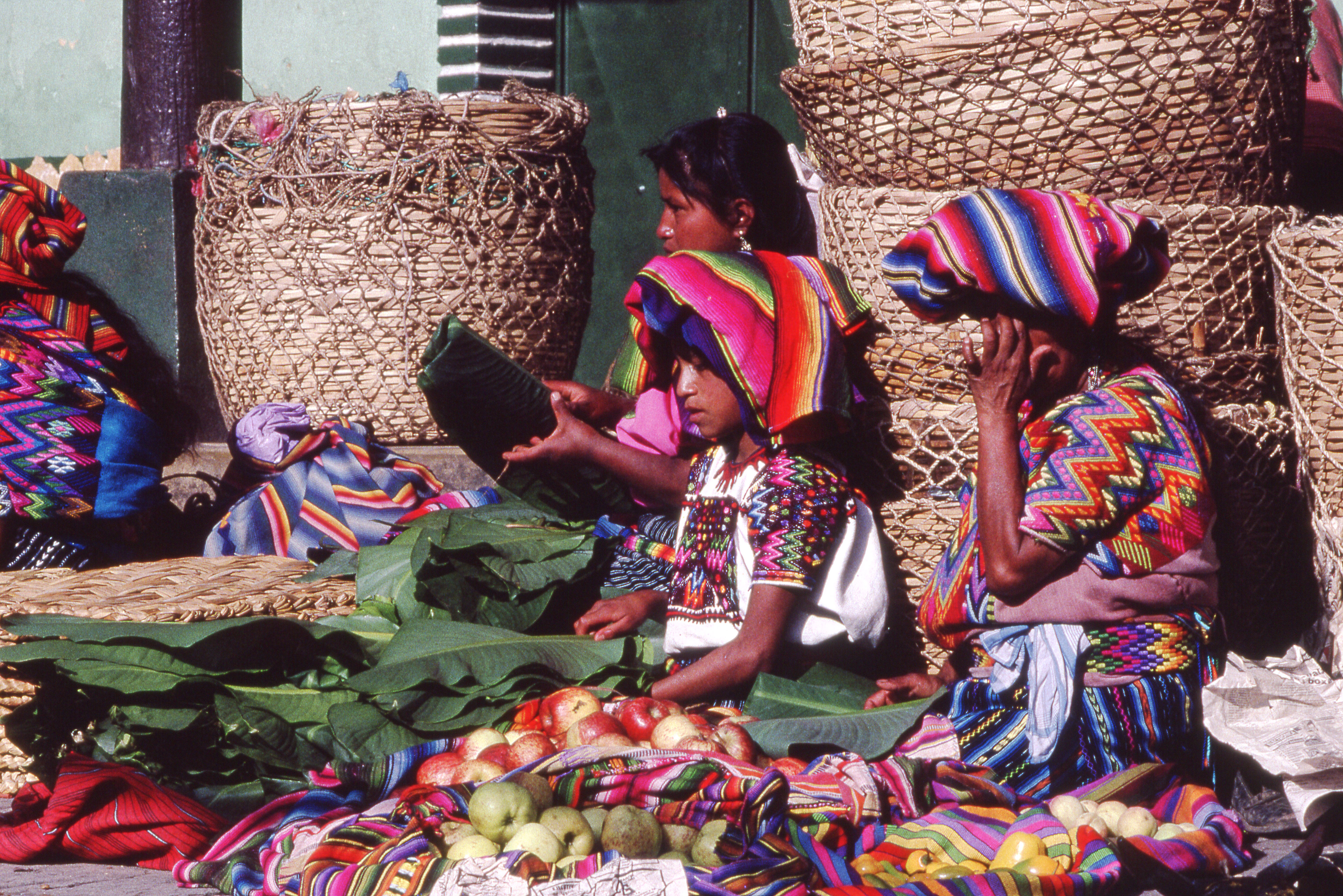
Modern Maya people in Sololá, Guatemala

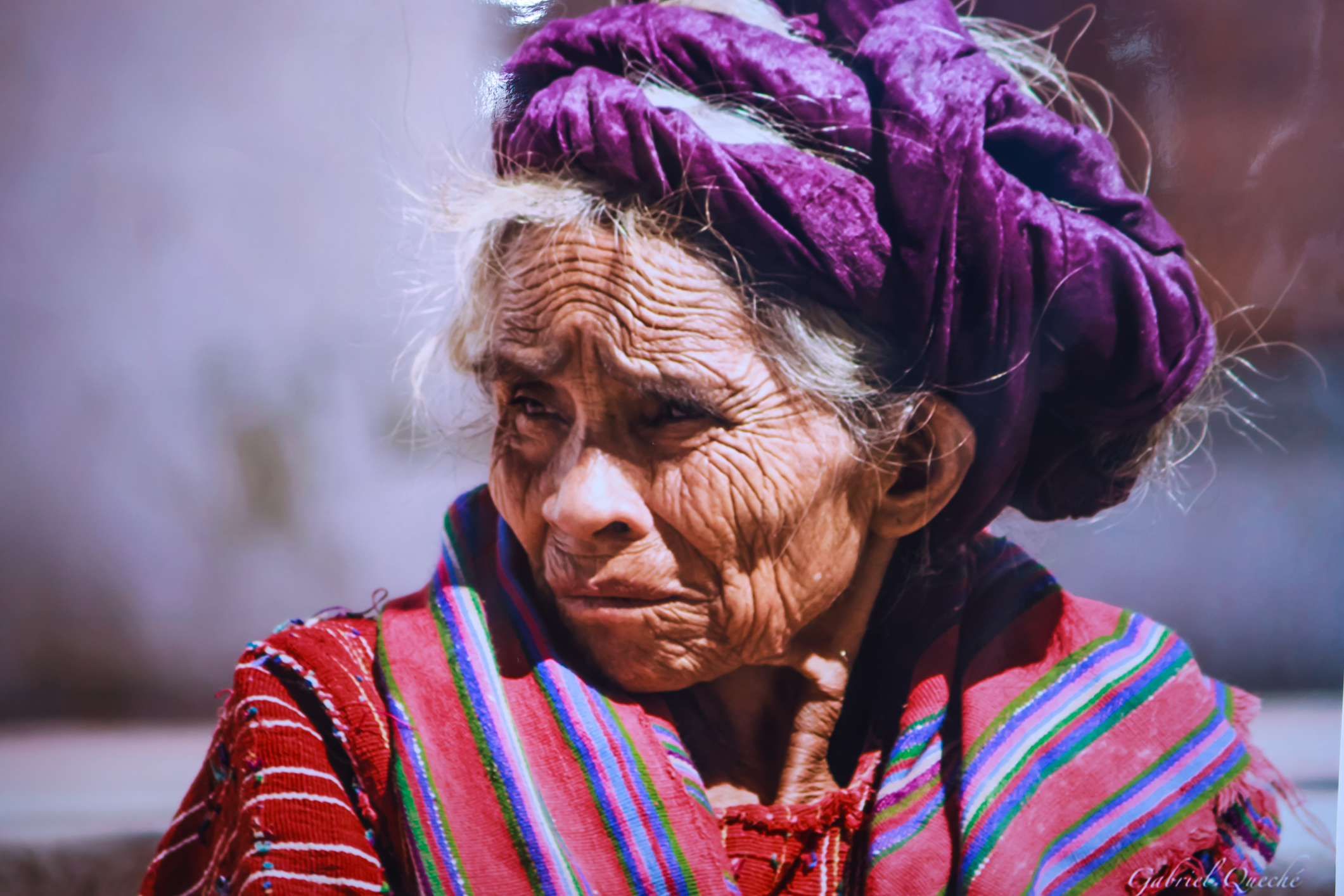
An elderly Maya woman

Guatemala has one of the largest Indigenous populations in Central America, with approximately 43.6% of the population considering themselves Indigenous. The Indigenous demographic portion of Guatemala's population consists of a majority of Maya groups and one non-Maya group. The Mayan language-speaking portion makes up 29.7% of the population and is distributed into 23 groups namely Q'eqchi' 8.3%, K'iche 7.8%, Mam 4.4%, Kaqchikel 3%, Q'anjob'al 1.2%, Poqomchi' 1%, and Other 4%. The non-Maya group consists of the Xinca who are another set of Indigenous people making up 1.8% of the population. Other sources indicate that between 50% and 60% of the population could be Indigenous because part of the Mestizo population is predominantly Indigenous.

The Maya peoples cover a vast geographic area throughout Central America and expand beyond Guatemala into other countries. One could find vast groups of Maya people in Boca Costa, in the Southern portions of Guatemala, as well as the Western Highlands living together in close communities. Within these communities and outside of them, around 23 Indigenous languages (or Native American Indigenous languages) are spoken as a first language. Of these 23 languages, they only received official recognition by the Government in 2003 under the Law of National Languages. The Law on National Languages recognizes 23 Indigenous languages including Xinca, enforcing that public and government institutions not only translate but also provide services in said languages. It would provide services in Cakchiquel, Garifuna, Kekchi, Mam, Quiche, and Xinca.

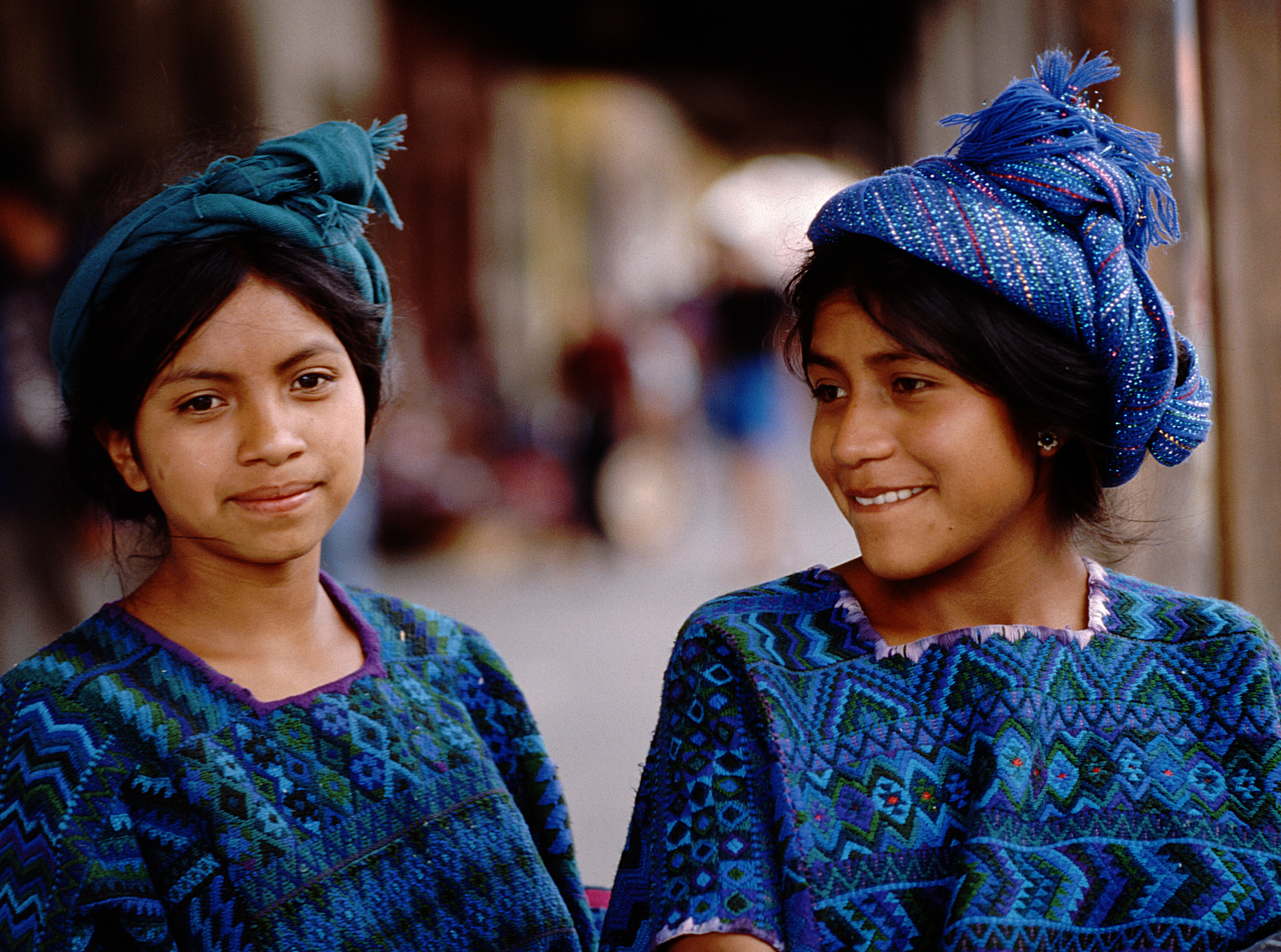
Indigenous girls in Quiché Department, 1996

The Law of National Languages has been an effort to grant and protect Indigenous peoples' rights not afforded to them previously. Along with the Law of National Languages passed in 2003, in 1996 the Guatemalan Constitutional Court had ratified the ILO Convention 169 on Indigenous and Tribal Peoples. The ILO Convention 169 on Indigenous and Tribal Peoples, is also known as Convention 169. Which is the only International Law regarding Indigenous peoples that Independent countries can adopt. The convention establishes that governments like Guatemala must consult with Indigenous groups before any projects occur on tribal lands.

==== Honduras ====
About 5 percent of the population is of full-blooded Indigenous descent, but as much as 80 percent of Hondurans are mestizo or part-Indigenous with European admixture, and about 10 percent are of Indigenous or African descent. The largest concentrations of Indigenous communities in Honduras are in the westernmost areas facing Guatemala and along the coast of the Caribbean Sea, as well as on the border with Nicaragua. The majority of Indigenous people are Lencas, Miskitos to the east, Mayas, Pech, Sumos, and Tolupan.

==== Nicaragua ====
About 5 percent of the Nicaraguan population is Indigenous. The largest Indigenous group in Nicaragua is the Miskito people. Their territory extended from Cabo Camarón, Honduras, to La Cruz de Rio Grande, Nicaragua along the Mosquito Coast. There is a native Miskito language, but large numbers speak Miskito Coast Creole, Spanish, Rama, and other languages. Their use of Creole English came about through frequent contact with the British, who colonized the area. Many Miskitos are Christians. Traditional Miskito society was highly structured, politically and otherwise. It had a king, but he did not have total power. Instead, the power was split between himself, a Miskito Governor, a Miskito General, and by the 1750s, a Miskito Admiral. Historical information on Miskito kings is often obscured by the fact that many of the kings were semi-mythical.

Another major Indigenous culture in eastern Nicaragua is the Mayangna (or Sumu) people, counting some 10,000 people. A smaller Indigenous culture in southeastern Nicaragua is the Rama.

Other Indigenous groups in Nicaragua are located in the central, northern, and Pacific areas and they are self-identified as follows: Chorotega, Cacaopera (or Matagalpa), Xiu-Subtiaba, and Nicarao.

==== Panama ====
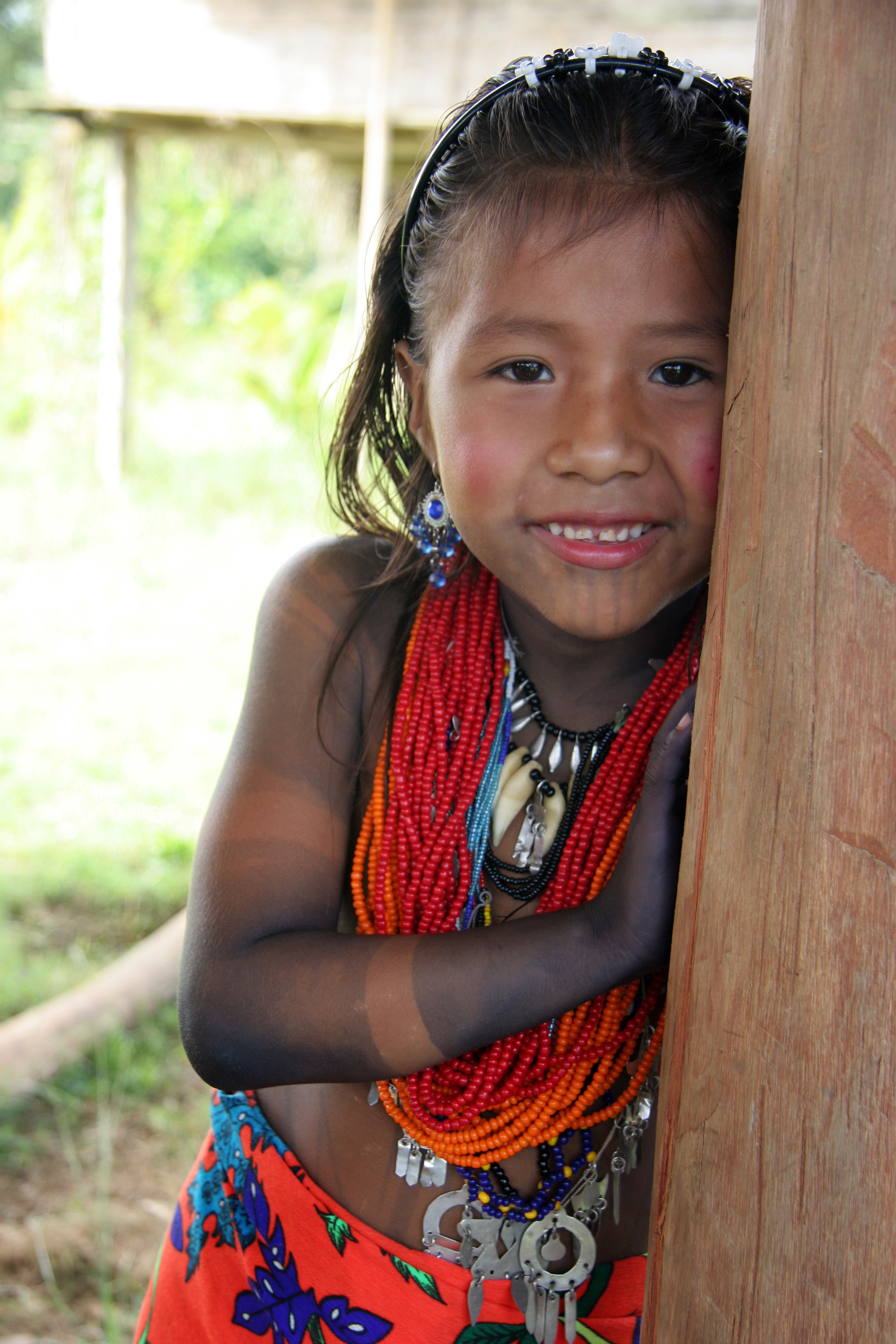
Embera girl in the Darién Province, 2006.

Indigenous peoples of Panama, or Native Panamanians, are the Native peoples of Panama. As of the 2023 census, Indigenous peoples constitute 17.2% of Panama's population of 4.5 million, totaling just over 698,000 individuals. The Ngäbe and Buglé comprise half of the Indigenous peoples of Panama.

Many of the Indigenous Peoples live on comarca indígenas, which are administrative regions for areas with substantial Indigenous populations. Three comarcas (Comarca Emberá-Wounaan, Guna Yala, Ngäbe-Buglé) exist as equivalent to a province, with two smaller comarcas (Guna de Madugandí and Guna de Wargandí) subordinate to a province and considered equivalent to a corregimiento (municipality).

=== South America ===
==== Argentina ====
Proportion of Native Argentines in each department in 2022.

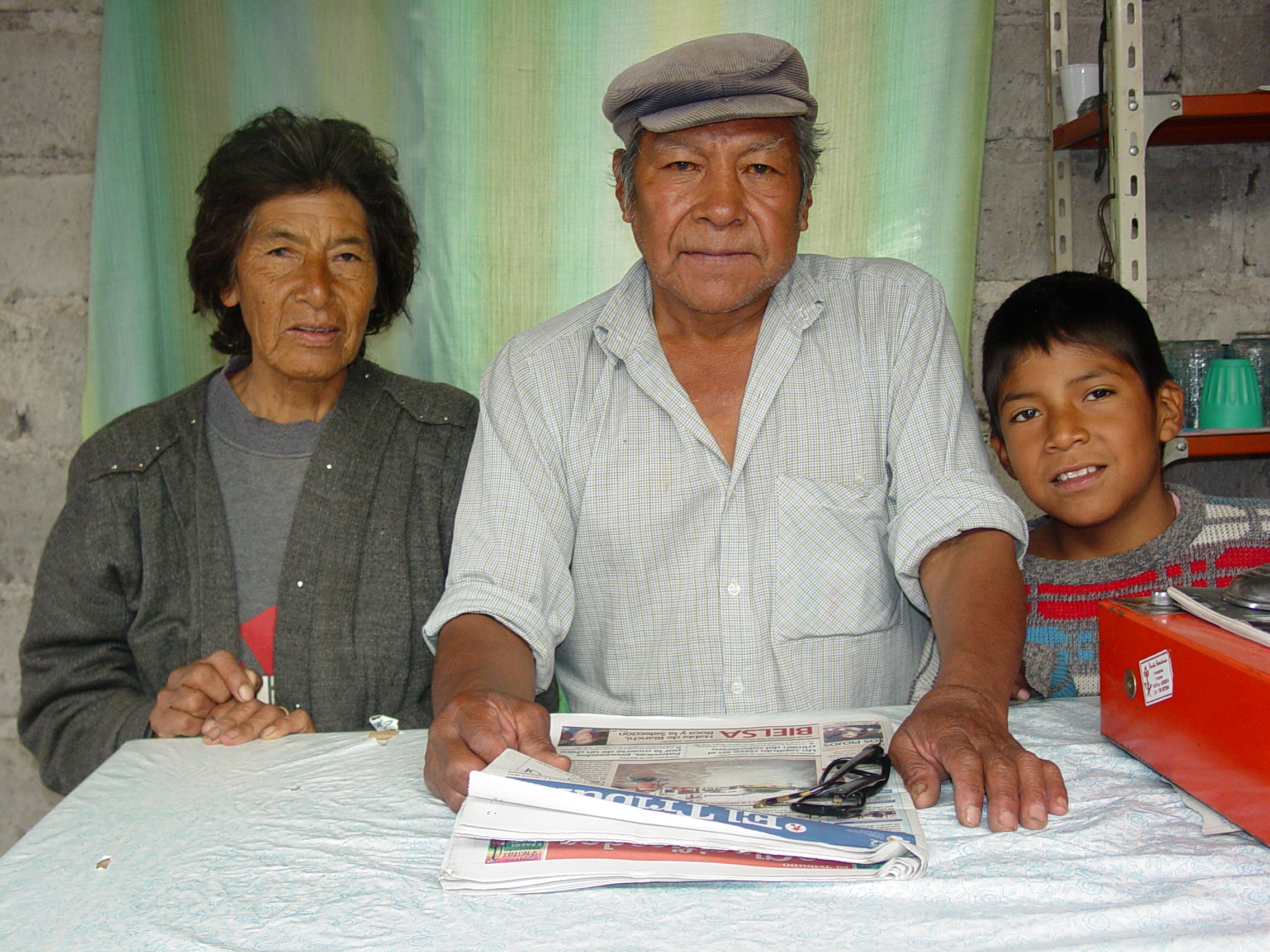
Owners of a roadside cafe near Cachi, Salta Province, Argentina

In 2005, the Indigenous population living in Argentina (known as pueblos originarios) numbered about 600,329 (1.6% of the total population); this figure includes 457,363 people who self-identified as belonging to an Indigenous ethnic group and 142,966 who identified themselves as first-generation descendants of an Indigenous people. The ten most populous Indigenous peoples are the Mapuche (113,680 people), the Kolla (70,505), the Toba (69,452), the Guaraní (68,454), the Wichi (40,036), the Diaguita–Calchaquí (31,753), the Mocoví (15,837), the Huarpe (14,633), the Comechingón (10,863) and the Tehuelche (10,590). Minor but important peoples are the Quechua (6,739), the Charrúa (4,511), the Pilagá (4,465), the Chané (4,376), and the Chorote (2,613). The Selkʼnam (Ona) people are now virtually extinct in its pure form. The languages of the Diaguita, Tehuelche, and Selkʼnam nations have become extinct or virtually extinct: the Cacán language (spoken by Diaguitas) in the 18th century and the Selkʼnam language in the 20th century; one Tehuelche language (Southern Tehuelche) is still spoken by a handful of elderly people.

==== Bolivia ====
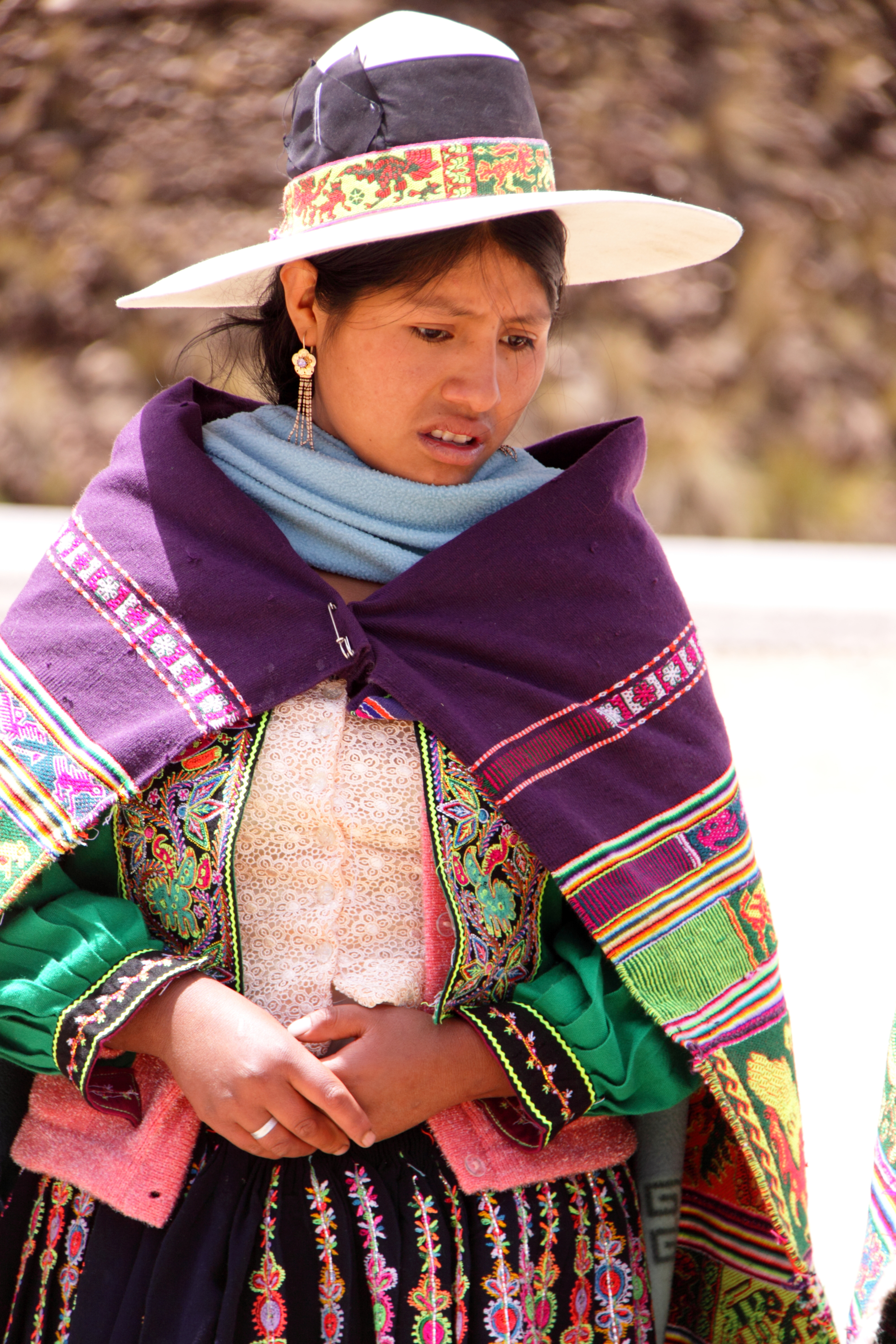
An Indigenous woman in traditional dress near Cochabamba, Bolivia

In Bolivia, the 2024 National Census reported that about 38% of their population self-identified as Indigenous. The census gathers a diversity of answers and forms "referential" groupings of Indigenous peoples based on them, it's not an "official" listing of the existing Indigenous groups. According to the 2024 census, the largest Indigenous ethnic groups are Quechua, about 1.6 million people; Aymara, 1.5 million; Guarani, 103 thousand and Chiquitano, 98 thousand. Some 544 thousand declared belonging to more than one Indigenous group and 335 thousand identified as "campesinos" (meaning farmers or peasants).

The Constitution of Bolivia, enacted in 2009, recognizes 36 cultures, each with its language, as part of a pluri-national state. Some groups, including CONAMAQ (the National Council of Ayllus and Markas of Qullasuyu), draw ethnic boundaries within the Quechua- and Aymara-speaking population, resulting in a total of 50 Indigenous peoples native to Bolivia.

Large numbers of Bolivian highland peasants retained Indigenous language, culture, customs, and communal organization throughout the Spanish conquest and the post-independence period. They mobilized to resist various attempts at the dissolution of communal landholdings and used legal recognition of "empowered caciques" to further communal organization. Indigenous revolts took place frequently until 1953. While the National Revolutionary Movement government began in 1952 and discouraged people identifying as Indigenous (reclassifying rural people as campesinos, or peasants), renewed ethnic and class militancy re-emerged in the Katarista movement beginning in the 1970s. Many lowland Indigenous peoples, mostly in the east, entered national politics through the 1990 March for Territory and Dignity organized by the CIDOB confederation. That march successfully pressured the national government to sign the ILO Convention 169 and to begin the still-ongoing process of recognizing and giving official titles to Indigenous territories. The 1994 Law of Popular Participation granted "grassroots territorial organizations;" these are recognized by the state and have certain rights to govern local areas.

Some radio and television programs are produced in the Quechua and Aymara languages. The constitutional reform in 1997 recognized Bolivia as a multi-lingual, pluri-ethnic society and introduced education reform. In 2005, for the first time in the country's history, an Indigenous Aymara, Evo Morales, was elected as president.

Morales began work on his "Indigenous autonomy" policy, which he launched in the eastern lowlands department on 3 August 2009. Bolivia was the first nation in the history of South America to affirm the right of Indigenous people to self-government. Speaking in Santa Cruz Department, the President called it "a historic day for the peasant and Indigenous movement", saying that, though he might make errors, he would "never betray the fight started by our ancestors and the fight of the Bolivian people". A vote on further autonomy for jurisdictions took place in December 2009, at the same time as general elections to office. The issue divided the country.

At that time, Indigenous peoples voted overwhelmingly for more autonomy: five departments that had not already done so voted for it; as did Gran Chaco Province in Taríja, for regional autonomy; and 11 of 12 municipalities that had referendums on this issue.

==== Brazil ====
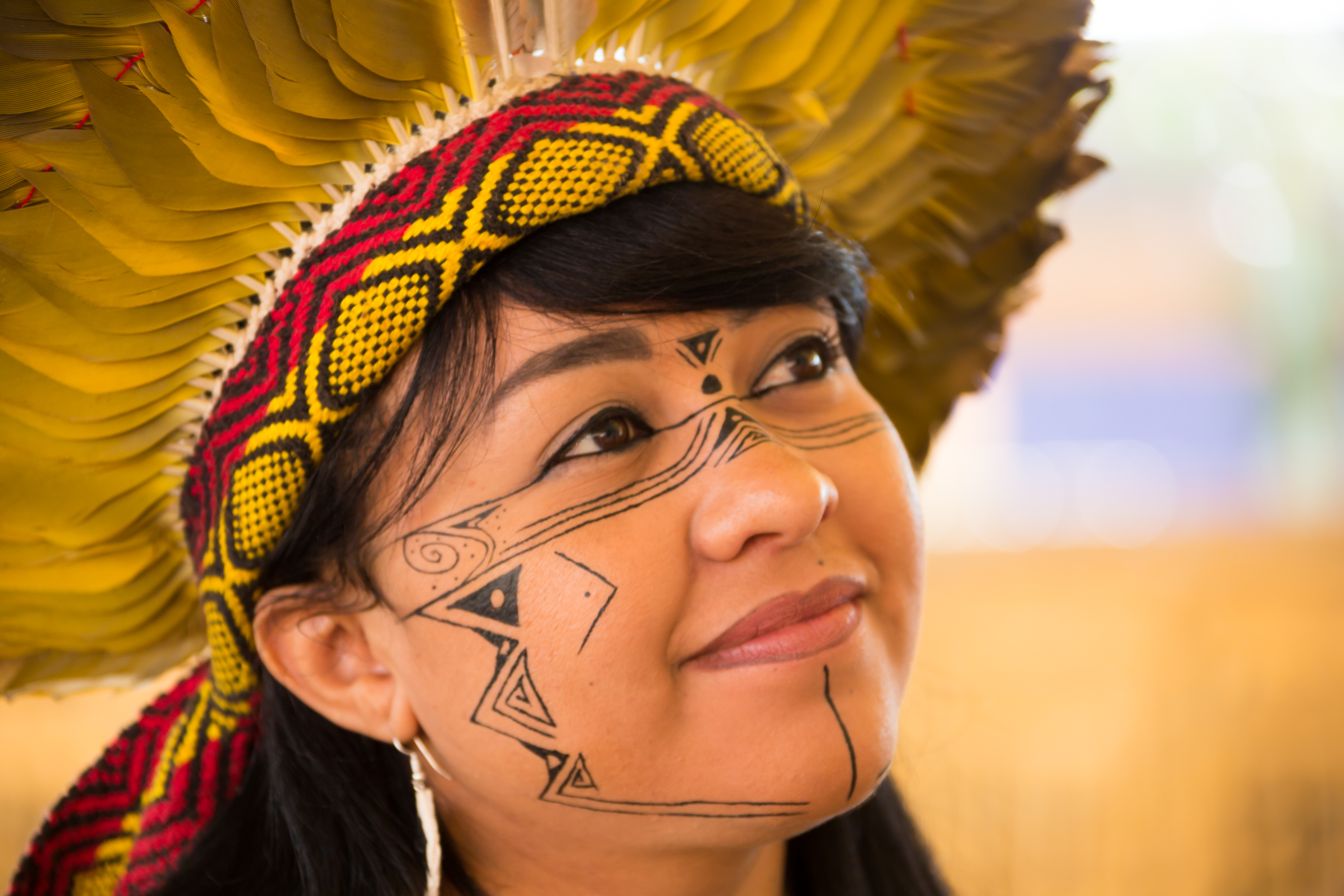
Célia Xakriabá, an Indigenous activist and politician from Brazil

Indigenous peoples of Brazil make up 0.83% of Brazil's population, or about 1,694,836 people according to the 2022 demographic census, but millions of Brazilians are mestizo or have some Indigenous ancestry. Indigenous peoples are found in the entire territory of Brazil, although in the 21st century, the majority of them live in Indigenous territories in the North and Center-Western parts of the country. On 18 January 2007, Fundação Nacional do Índio (FUNAI) reported that it had confirmed the presence of 67 different uncontacted tribes in Brazil, up from 40 in 2005. Brazil is now the nation that has the largest number of uncontacted tribes, and the island of New Guinea is second.

The Washington Post reported in 2007, "As has been proved in the past when uncontacted tribes are introduced to other populations and the microbes they carry, maladies as simple as the common cold can be deadly. In the 1970s, 185 members of the Panara tribe died within two years of discovery after contracting such diseases as flu and chickenpox, leaving only 69 survivors."

==== Chile ====
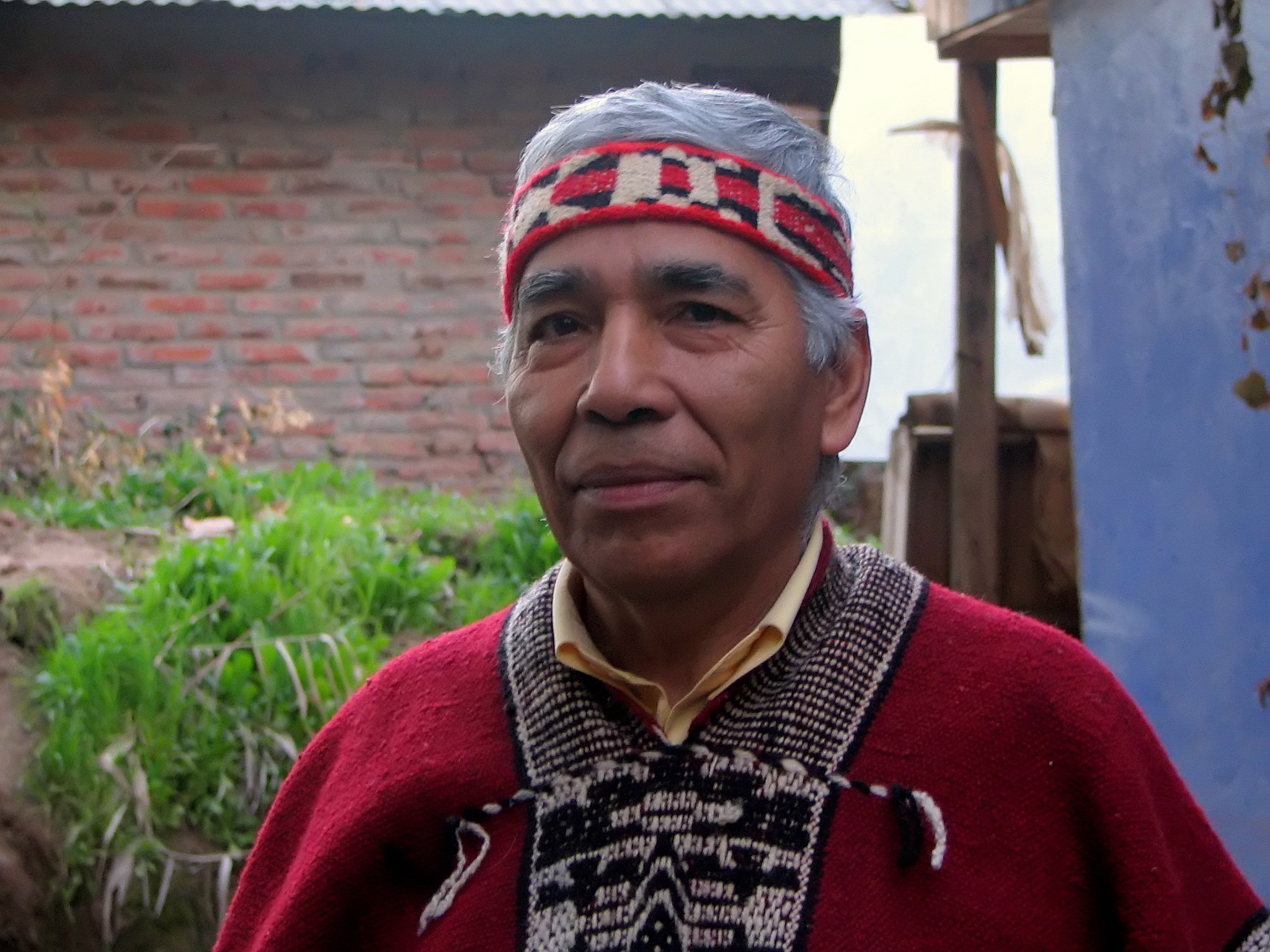
A Mapuche man in present-day Chile

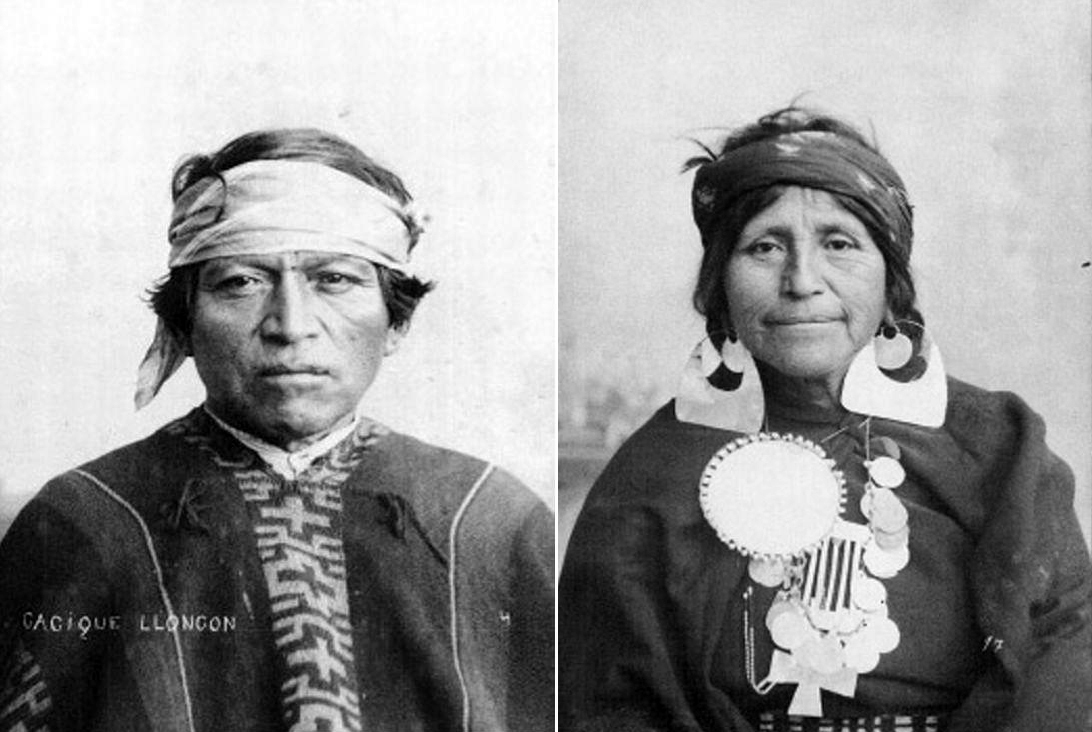
A Mapuche man and woman; the Mapuche make up about 85% of Indigenous population that live in Chile.

According to the 2024 Census, 11.5% of the Chilean population, including the Rapa Nui (a Polynesian people) of Easter Island, was Indigenous, although most show varying degrees of mixed heritage. Many are descendants of the Mapuche and live in Santiago, Araucanía, and Los Lagos Region. The Mapuche successfully fought off defeat in the first 300–350 years of Spanish rule during the Arauco War. Relations with the new Chilean Republic were good until the Chilean state decided to occupy their lands. During the Occupation of Araucanía, the Mapuche surrendered to the country's army in the 1880s. Their land was opened to settlement by Chileans and Europeans. Conflict over Mapuche land rights continues to the present.

Other groups include the Aymara, the majority of whom live in Bolivia and Peru, with smaller numbers in the Arica-Parinacota and Tarapacá regions, and the Atacama people (Atacameños), who reside mainly in El Loa.

==== Colombia ====
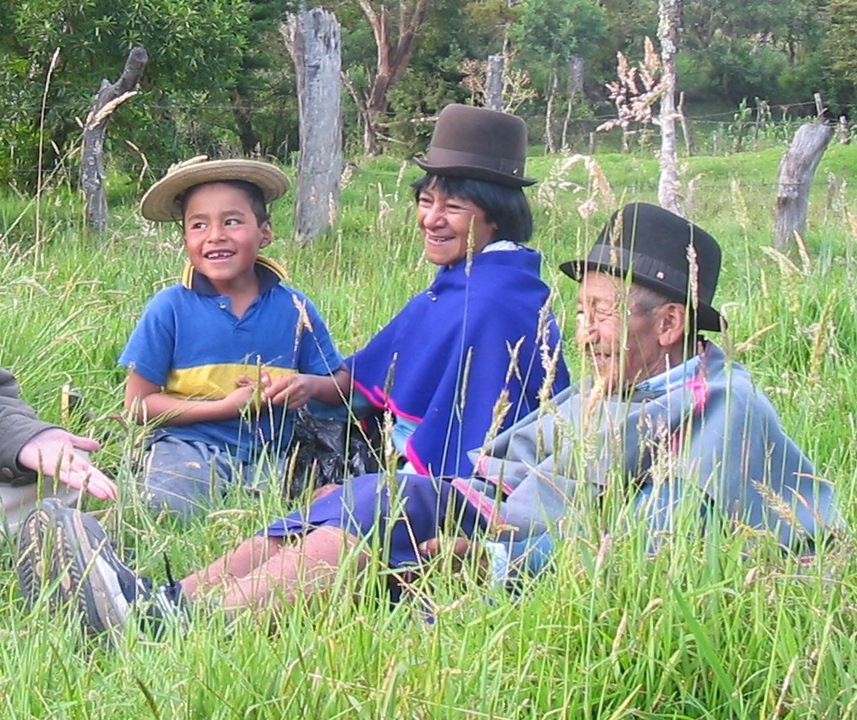
Guambía people relaxing in Colombia

A minority today within Colombia's mostly mestizo and White Colombian population, Indigenous peoples living in Colombia, consist of around 85 distinct cultures and around 1,905,617 people, however, it is likely much higher. A variety of collective rights for Indigenous peoples are recognized in the 1991 Constitution. One of the influences is the Muisca culture, a subset of the larger Chibcha ethnic group, famous for their use of gold, which led to the legend of El Dorado. At the time of the Spanish conquest, the Muisca were the largest Indigenous civilization geographically between the Inca and the Aztec empires.

==== Ecuador ====
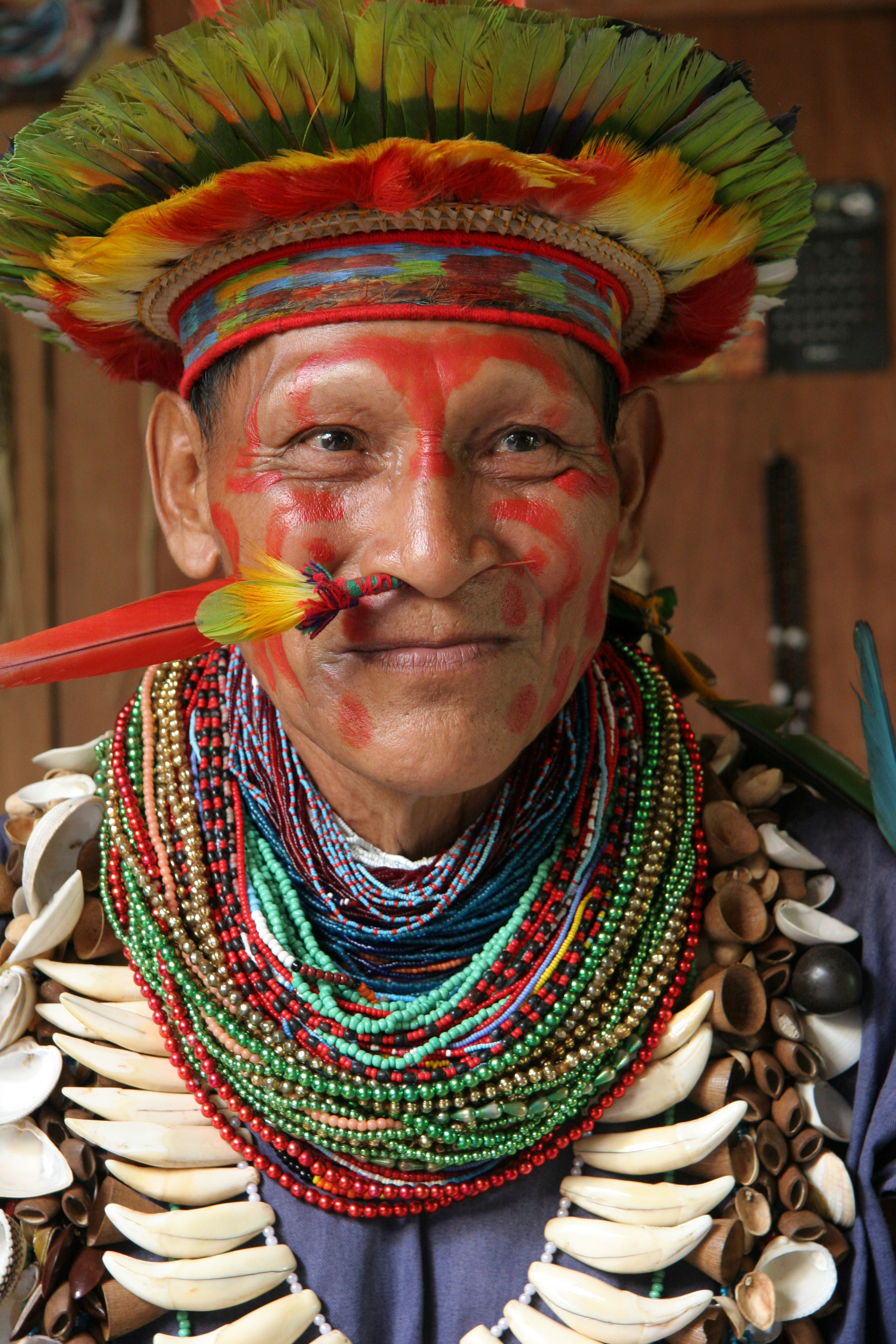
Shaman of the Cofán people from the Amazonian forest in present-day Ecuador

Ecuador was the site of many Indigenous cultures and civilizations of different proportions. An early sedentary culture, known as the Valdivia culture, developed in the coastal region, while the Caras and the Quitus unified to form an elaborate civilization that ended at the birth of the Capital Quito. The Cañaris near Cuenca were the most advanced, and most feared by the Inca, due to their fierce resistance to the Incan expansion. Their architectural remains were later destroyed by the Spaniards and the Incas.

Between 55% and 65% of Ecuador's population consists of Mestizos of mixed Indigenous and European ancestry, while Indigenous people comprise about 25%. Genetic analysis indicates that Ecuadorian Mestizos are of predominantly Indigenous ancestry. Approximately 96.4% of Ecuador's Indigenous population are Highland Quichuas living in the valleys of the Sierra region. Primarily consisting of the descendants of peoples conquered by the Incas, they are Kichwa speakers and include the Caranqui, the Otavalos, the Cayambe, the Quitu-Caras, the Panzaleo, the Chimbuelo, the Salasacan, the Tugua, the Puruhá, the Cañari, and the Saraguro. Linguistic evidence suggests that the Salascan and the Saraguro may have been the descendants of Bolivian ethnic groups transplanted to Ecuador as mitimaes.

Coastal groups, including the Awá, Chachi, and the Tsáchila, make up 0.24% percent of the Indigenous population, while the remaining 3.35 percent live in the Oriente and consist of the Oriente Kichwa (the Canelo and the Quijos), the Shuar, the Huaorani, the Siona-Secoya, the Cofán, and the Achuar.

In 1986, Indigenous peoples in Ecuador formed the first "truly" national political organization. The Confederation of Indigenous Nationalities of Ecuador (CONAIE) has been the primary political institution of Indigenous peoples since then and is now the second-largest political party in the nation. It has been influential in national politics, contributing to the ouster of presidents Abdalá Bucaram in 1997 and Jamil Mahuad in 2000.

==== French Guiana ====
French Guiana is home to approximately 10,000 Indigenous peoples, such as the Kalina and Lokono. Over time, the Indigenous population has protested against various environmental issues, such as illegal gold mining, pollution, and a drastic decrease in wild game.

==== Guyana ====
During the early stages of colonization, the Indigenous peoples in Guyana partook in trade relations with Dutch settlers and assisted in militia services such as hunting down escaped slaves for the British, which continued until the 19th century. Indigenous Guyanese people are responsible for the invention of the Guyanese pepperpot and the foundation of the Alleluia church.

Guyana's Indigenous peoples have been recognized under the Constitution of 1965 and comprise 9.16% of the overall population.

==== Paraguay ====
The vast majority of Indigenous peoples in Paraguay are concentrated in the Gran Chaco region in the northwest of the country, with the Guaraní making up the majority of the Indigenous population in Paraguay. The Guaraní language is recognized as an official language alongside Spanish, with approximately 90% of the population speaking Guaraní. The Indigenous population in Paraguay faces challenges such as low literacy rates and lack of safe drinking water or electricity.

==== Peru ====
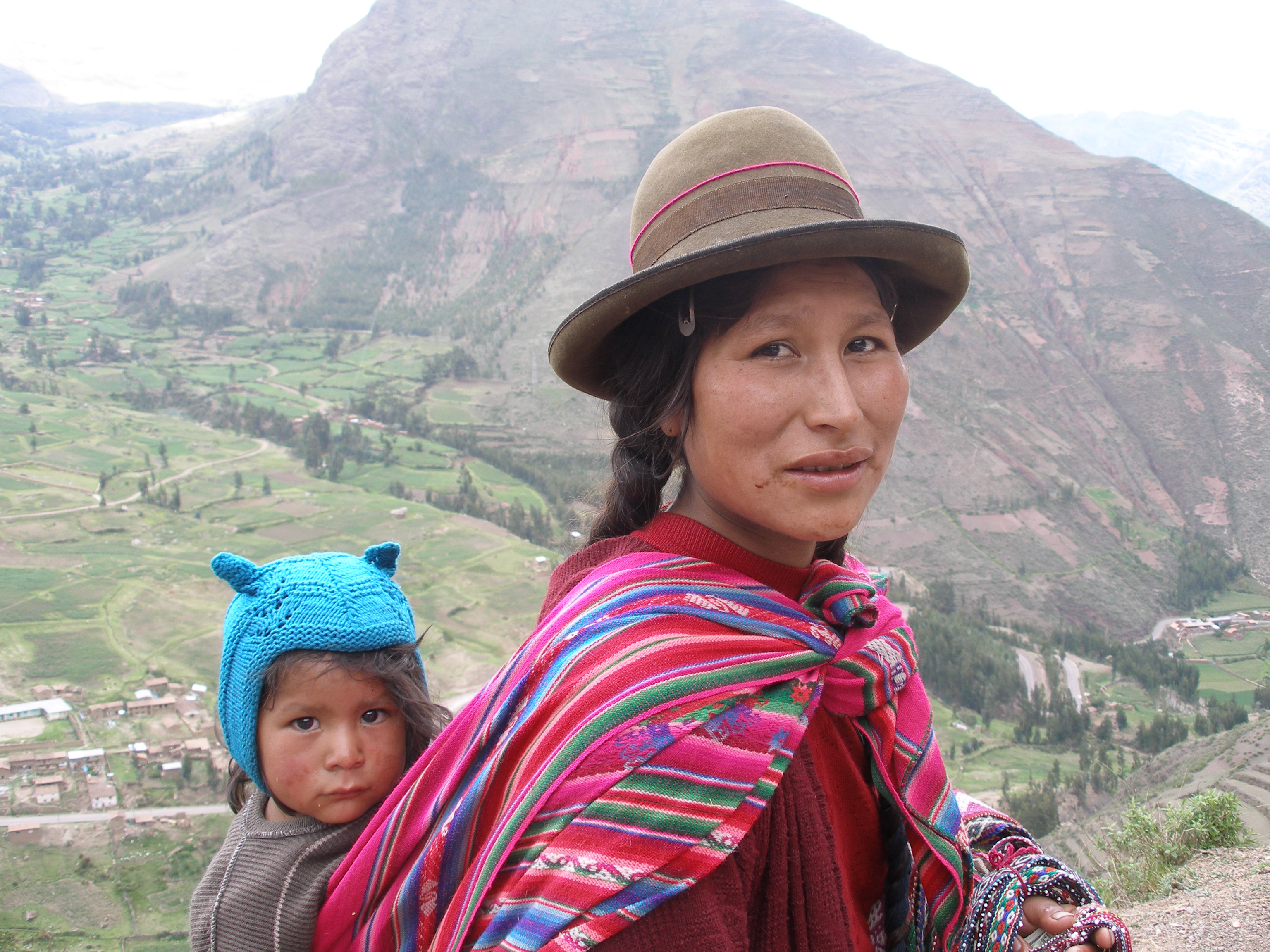
A Quechua woman and child in the Sacred Valley in Cuzco Region, Peru

According to the 2025 Peruvian census, the Indigenous in Peru make up 20.7% of the population. This does not include mestizos of mixed Indigenous and European descent, who make up the majority of the population. Genetic testing indicates that Peruvian Mestizos are of predominantly Indigenous ancestry. Indigenous traditions and customs have shaped the way Peruvians live and see themselves today. Cultural citizenship — or what Renato Rosaldo has called, "the right to be different and to belong, in a democratic, participatory sense" (1996:243) — is not yet very well developed in Peru. This is most apparent in the country's Amazonian region, where Indigenous societies continue to struggle against state-sponsored economic abuses, cultural discrimination, and pervasive violence.

==== Suriname ====
According to the 2012 census, the Indigenous population of Suriname numbers around 20,000, amounting to 3.8% of the population. The most numerous Indigenous groups in Suriname primarily comprise the Lokono, Kalina, Tiriyó, and Wayana.

==== Uruguay ====
In the 2023 census, 6.4% of the population in Uruguay claimed to have some degree of indigenous ancestry while 2.4% of the population identified it as their main ancestry.

==== Venezuela ====
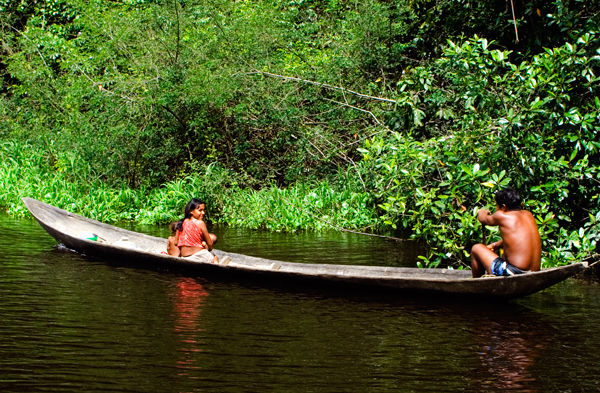
A Warao family traveling in their canoe in Venezuela

Most Venezuelans have some degree of Indigenous heritage even if they may not identify as such. The 2011 census estimated that around 52% of the population identified as mestizo. But those who identify as Indigenous, from being raised in those cultures, make up only around 2% of the total population. The Indigenous peoples speak around 29 different languages and many more dialects. As some of the ethnic groups are very small, their native languages are in danger of becoming extinct in the next decades. The most important Indigenous groups are the Ye'kuana, the Wayuu, the Kali'na, the Ya̧nomamö, the Pemon, and the Warao. The most advanced Indigenous peoples to have lived within the boundaries of present-day Venezuela are thought to have been the Timoto-cuicas, who lived in the Venezuelan Andes. Historians estimate that there were between 350,000 and 500,000 Indigenous inhabitants at the time of Spanish colonization. The most densely populated area was the Andean region (Timoto-cuicas), thanks to their advanced agricultural techniques and ability to produce a surplus of food.

The 1999 constitution of Venezuela gives Indigenous peoples special rights, although the vast majority of them still live in very critical conditions of poverty. The government provides primary education in their languages in public schools to some of the largest groups, in efforts to continue the languages.

=== Caribbean ===
The Indigenous population of the Caribbean islands consisted of the Taíno of the Lucayan Archipelago, the Greater Antilles and the northern Lesser Antilles, the Kalinago of the Lesser Antilles, the Ciguayo and Macorix of parts of Hispaniola, and the Guanahatabey of western Cuba. The overall population suffered the most adverse colonial effects out of all the Indigenous populations in the Americas, as the Kalinago have been reduced to a few islands in the Lesser Antilles such as Dominica and the Taíno are culturally extinct, though a large proportion of populations in Greater Antillean islands such as Puerto Rico and Cuba to a lesser extent, possesses degrees of Taíno ancestry. The Cayman Islands were the only island group in the Caribbean to have remained unsettled by Indigenous peoples before the colonial era.

==== Cuba ====
Cuba was populated by Indigenous peoples prior to the arrival of Europeans in 1492. However, due to the Taíno genocide that took place in the West Indies during the 16th century, most of their culture no longer remains, including the Taíno language. The census of Cuba does not count Indigenous people either.

=== Asia ===
==== Philippines ====
Historically, during the Spanish colonization of the Philippines, the territory was ruled as a province of the Mexico-centered Viceroyalty of New Spain and thus many Mexicans including those of Nahua descent, were sent as colonists there. According to a genetic study by the National Geographic, Filipinos can trace an average of 2% of their ancestry to Native Americans.

== Demography ==
The following table lists census figures for each country and territory in the Americas of the populations of Indigenous peoples, each expressed as a percentage of the total population. Where census data is not available, it provides an estimate. This table includes people who are considered Indigenous in each of the listed countries and territories, and it does not count people with just partially Indigenous identity such as Mestizos and Pardos in Latin America or people who identify as Native American in combination with another race in the United States. One exception is Canada, where the Métis are also counted as Indigenous in this table.

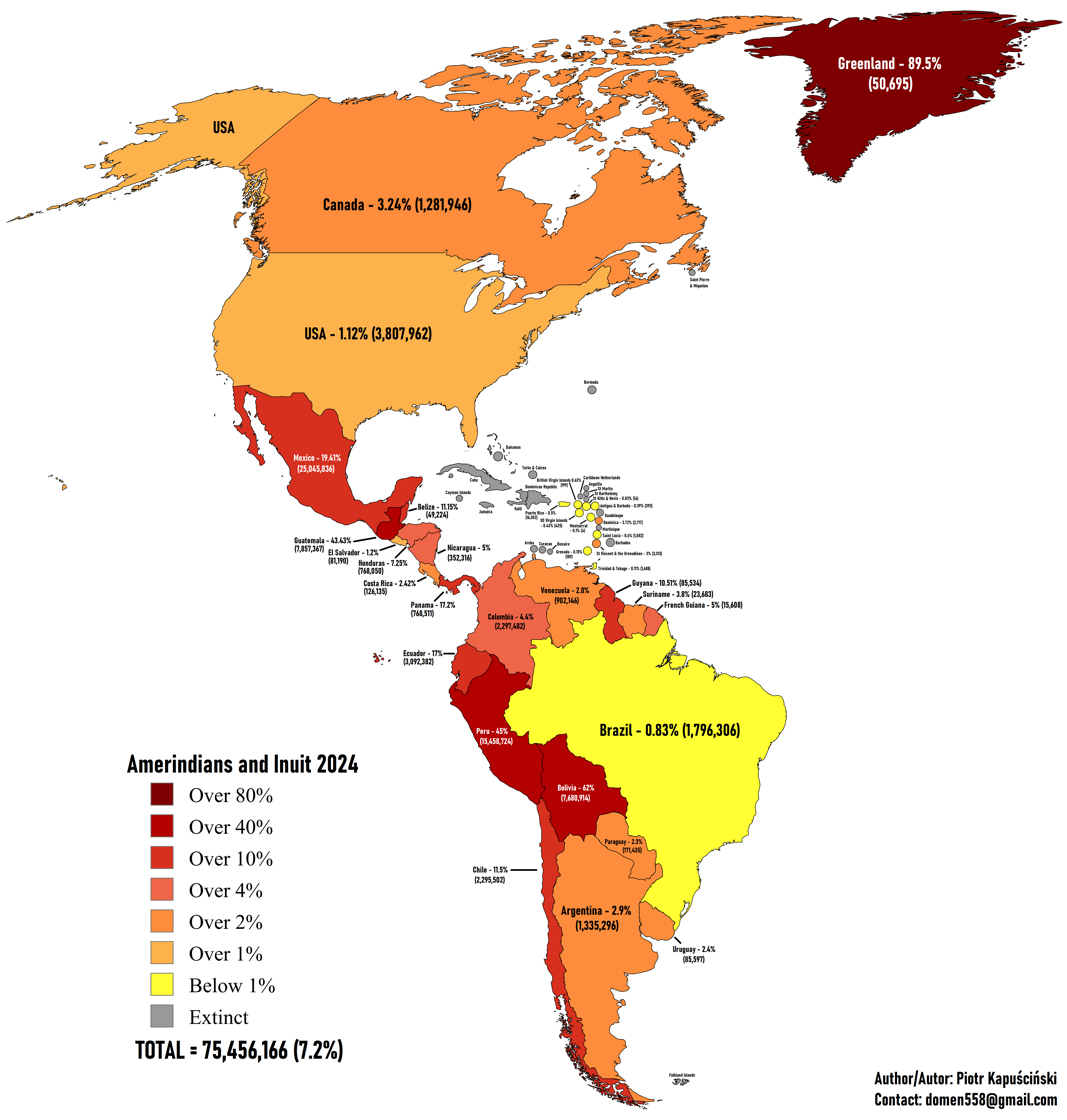
Indigenous populations of the Americas in 2024.

Indigenous populations of the Americas as percentage of total country's or territory's population
Country or Territory	Indigenous % (Most recent census available)	Ref.
Antigua and Barbuda	0.39%	
Argentina	2.9%	
Belize	11.15%	
Bolivia	37.63%	
Brazil	0.83%	
British Virgin Islands	0.63%	
Canada	5.0%	
Chile	11.46%	
Colombia	4.4%	
Costa Rica	2.42%	
Cuba (estimate)	0.04%	
Dominica	3.72%	
Ecuador	7.7%	
El Salvador	1.2%	
French Guiana (estimate)	4% - 10%	
Greenland	89.5%	
Grenada	0.2%	
Guatemala	43.43%	
Guyana	10.51%	
Honduras	7.25%	
Jamaica (estimate)	0.11%	
Mexico	19.41%	
Montserrat	0.35%	
Nicaragua	6.0%	
Panama	17.17%	
Paraguay	2.3%	
Peru	20.74%	
Puerto Rico	0.5%	
Saint Lucia	0.6%	
Saint Kitts and Nevis	0.02%	
Saint Vincent and the Grenadines	5.1%	
Suriname	3.8%	
Trinidad and Tobago	0.11%	
U.S. Virgin Islands	0.43%	
Uruguay	2.4%	
United States	1.12%	
Venezuela	2.8%	

Other countries and territories, not listed in this table, either have no Indigenous population, or there is no data.

== Rise of Indigenous movements ==
Since the late 20th century, Indigenous peoples in the Americas have become more politically active in asserting their treaty rights and expanding their influence. Some have organized to achieve some sort of self-determination and preservation of their cultures. Organizations such as the Coordinator of Indigenous Organizations of the Amazon River Basin and the Indian Council of South America are examples of movements that are overcoming national borders to reunite Indigenous populations, for instance, those across the Amazon Basin. Similar movements for Indigenous rights can also be seen in Canada and the United States, with movements like the International Indian Treaty Council and the accession of native Indigenous groups into the Unrepresented Nations and Peoples Organization.

There has been a recognition of Indigenous movements on an international scale. The membership of the United Nations voted to adopt the Declaration on the Rights of Indigenous Peoples, despite dissent from some of the stronger countries of the Americas.

In Colombia, various Indigenous groups have protested the denial of their rights. People organized a march in Cali in October 2008 to demand the government live up to promises to protect Indigenous lands, defend the Indigenous against violence, and reconsider the free trade pact with the United States.

=== Indigenous heads of state ===
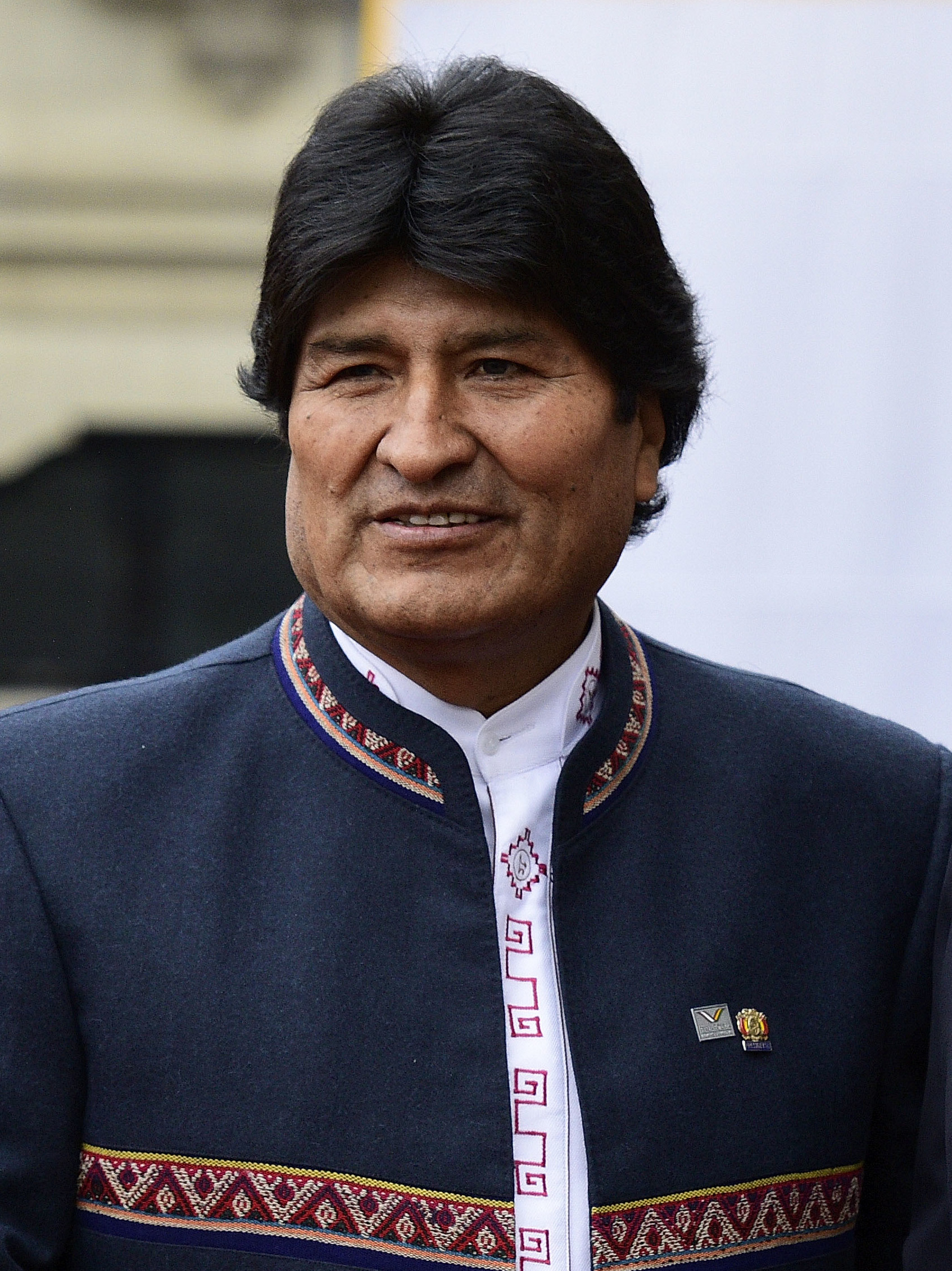
Evo Morales, an Aymara member and former President of Bolivia

The first Indigenous President of the Americas was José María Melo, of Pijao descent, who led Colombia in 1854 starting on 17 April 1854. José was born on 9 October 1800, in Chaparral, Tolima, and before his presidency, he fought alongside Simon Bolivar in the Spanish-American Wars of Independence. José María Melo led the Republic of New Granada during the Colombian Civil War of 1854 but eventually lost and was exiled on 4 December 1854.

The first Indigenous candidate to be democratically elected as head of a country in the Americas was Benito Juárez, a Zapotec Mexican who was elected President of Mexico in 1858 and led the country until 1872 and led the country to victory during the Second French intervention in Mexico.

In 1930 Luis Miguel Sánchez Cerro became the first Peruvian President with Indigenous Peruvian ancestry and the first in South America. He came to power in a military coup.

In 2005, Evo Morales of the Aymara people was the first Indigenous candidate elected as president of Bolivia and the first elected in South America.

== Genetic research ==
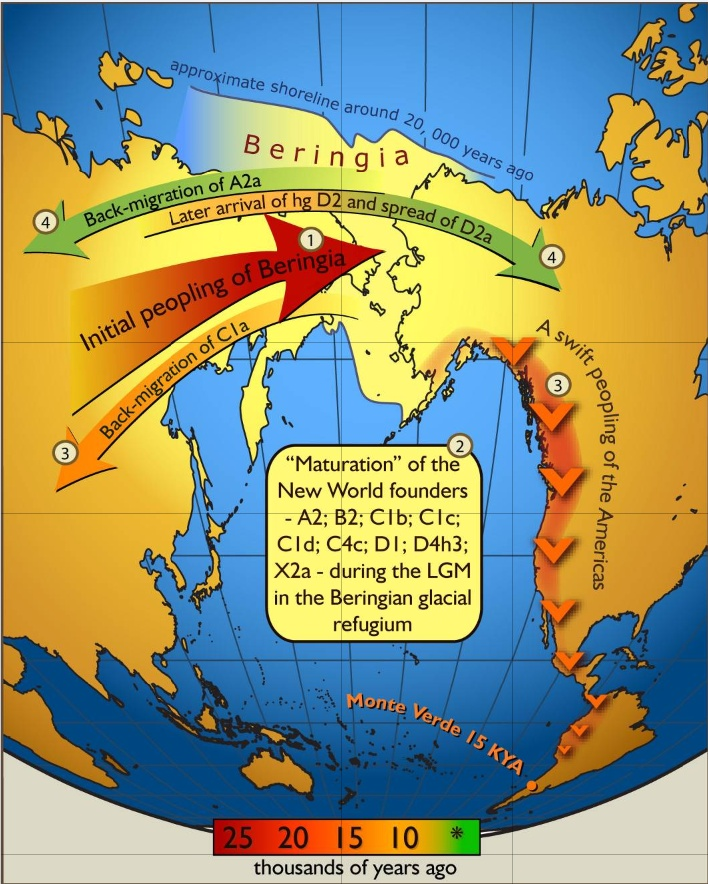
A schematic illustration of maternal (mtDNA) gene-flow in and out of Beringia, from 25,000 years ago to present

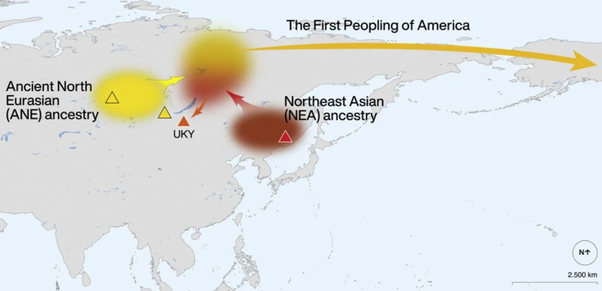
A map showing the origin of the first wave of humans into the Americas, including the Ancestral Northern Eurasian, which represent a distinct Paleolithic Siberian population, and the Northeast Asians, which are an East Asian-related group. The admixture happened somewhere in Northeast Siberia.

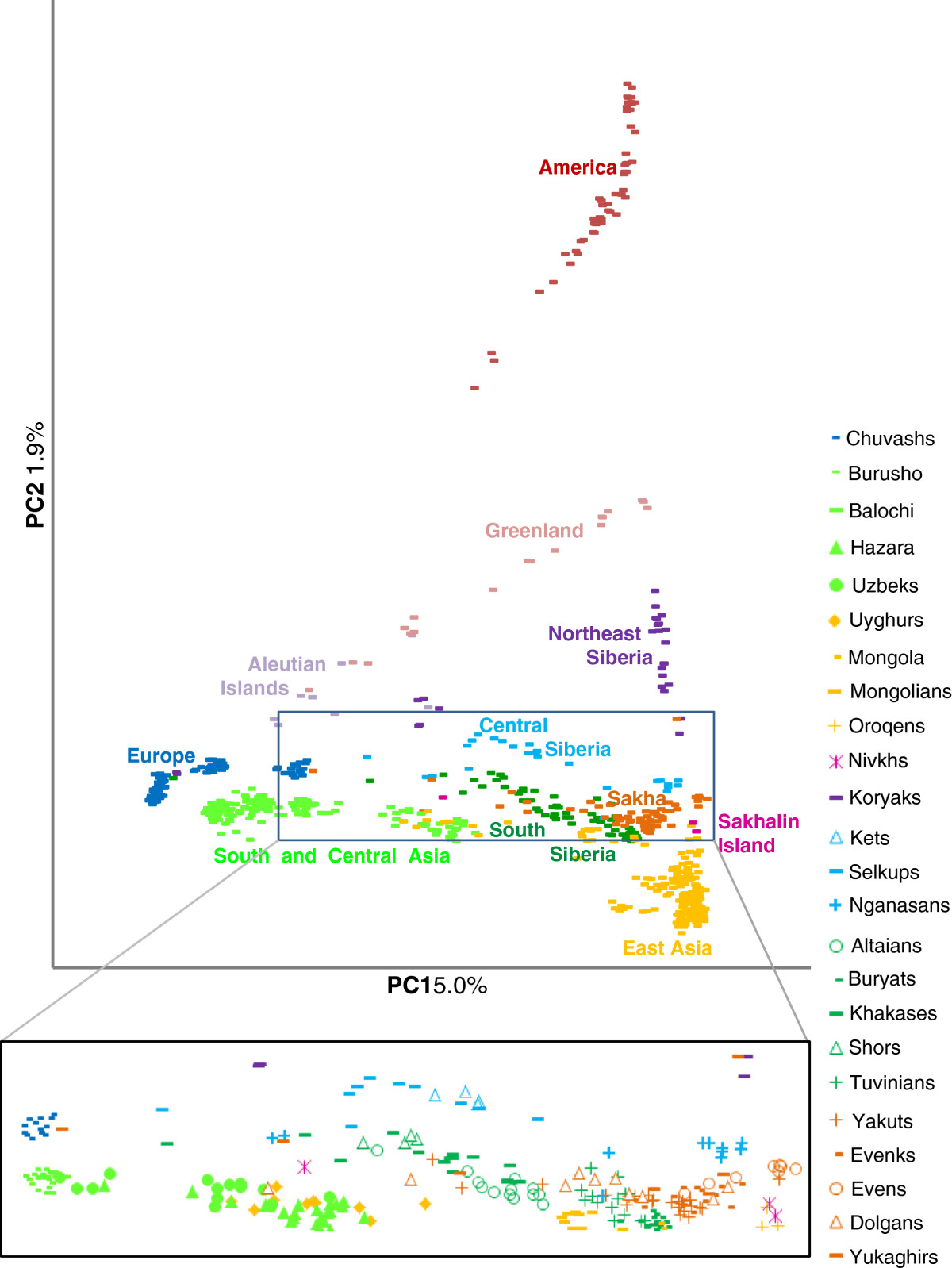
Principal component analysis showing the Native American cluster in other Eurasian populations.

Genetic history of Indigenous peoples of the Americas primarily focuses on Human Y-chromosome DNA haplogroups and Human mitochondrial DNA haplogroups. "Y-DNA" is passed solely along the patrilineal line, from father to son, while "mtDNA" is passed down the matrilineal line, from mother to offspring of both sexes. Neither recombines and thus Y-DNA and mtDNA change only by chance mutation at each generation with no intermixture between parents' genetic material. Autosomal "atDNA" markers are also used but differ from mtDNA or Y-DNA in that they overlap significantly. AtDNA is generally used to measure the average continent-of-ancestry genetic admixture in the entire human genome and related isolated populations.

Genetic comparisons of the mitochondrial DNA (mtDNA) and Y-chromosome of Native Americans to that of certain Siberian and Central Asian peoples (specifically Paleo-Siberians, Turkic, and historically the Okunev culture) have led Russian researcher I.A. Zakharov to believe that, among all the previously studied Asian peoples, it is "the peoples living between Altai and Lake Baikal along the Sayan mountains that are genetically closest to" Indigenous Americans.

Some scientific evidence links them to North Asian peoples, specifically the Indigenous peoples of Siberia, such as the Ket, Selkup, Chukchi, and Koryak peoples. Indigenous peoples of the Americas have been linked to some extent to North Asian populations by the distribution of blood types, and in genetic composition as reflected by molecular data, and limited DNA studies.

The common occurrence of the Asian mtDNA haplogroups A, B, C, and D among eastern Asian and Native American populations has been noted. Some subclades of C and D that have been found in the limited populations of Native Americans who have agreed to DNA testing bear some resemblance to the C and D subclades in Mongolian, Amur, Japanese, Korean, and Ainu populations.

Available genetic patterns lead to two main theories of genetic episodes affecting the Indigenous peoples of the Americas; first with the initial peopling of the Americas, and secondly with European colonization of the Americas. The former is the determinant factor for the number of gene lineages, zygosity mutations, and founding haplotypes present in today's Indigenous peoples of the Americas populations.

The most popular theory among anthropologists is the Bering Strait theory, of human settlement of the New World occurring in stages from the Bering Sea coastline, with a possible initial layover of 10,000 to 20,000 years in Beringia for the small founding population. The micro-satellite diversity and distributions of the Y lineage specific to South America indicate that certain Indigenous peoples of the Americas populations have been isolated since the initial colonization of the region. The Na-Dené, Inuit, and Indigenous populations of Alaska exhibit haplogroup Q (Y-DNA) mutations, however are distinct from other Indigenous peoples of the Americas with various mtDNA and atDNA mutations. This suggests that the earliest migrants into the northern extremes of North America including Greenland derived from later migrant populations.

Multiple recent findings on autosomal DNA and full genome revealed more information about the formation, settlement, and external relationships of the Indigenous peoples of the Americas to other populations. Native Americans are very closely related to the Paleosiberian tribes of Siberia, and to the ancient samples of the Mal'ta–Buret' culture (Ancient North Eurasians) as well as to the Ancient Beringians. Native Americans also share a relatively higher genetic affinity with East Asian peoples. Native American genetic ancestry is occasionally dubbed as "Amerindian". This type of ancestry largely overlaps with "Paleosiberian" ancestry but is differentiated from "Neo-Siberian" ancestry, which represents historical expansions from Northeast Asia and is today widespread among Siberian populations. The ancestors of Native Americans used a single migration route, most likely through Beringia, and subsequently populated all of the Americas in a time range between 25,000 and 15,000 years ago. Possible contact between Native Americans and Polynesians dates back to 1,400 years ago. Previously hypothesized "Paleo-Indian" groups turned out to be genetically identical to modern Native Americans. The controversial claim that the first peoples came from Europe via the North Atlantic, based on an ostensible similarity in stone-tool technology between the Solutrean culture of Pleistocene Europe and Clovis in North America, was undermined by the genome of the Anzick Clovis child, which sits squarely on the branch of Ancestral Native American peoples. No ancient or present-day genome (or mtDNA or Y chromosome marker) in the Americas has shown any direct affinities to Upper Palaeolithic European populations.

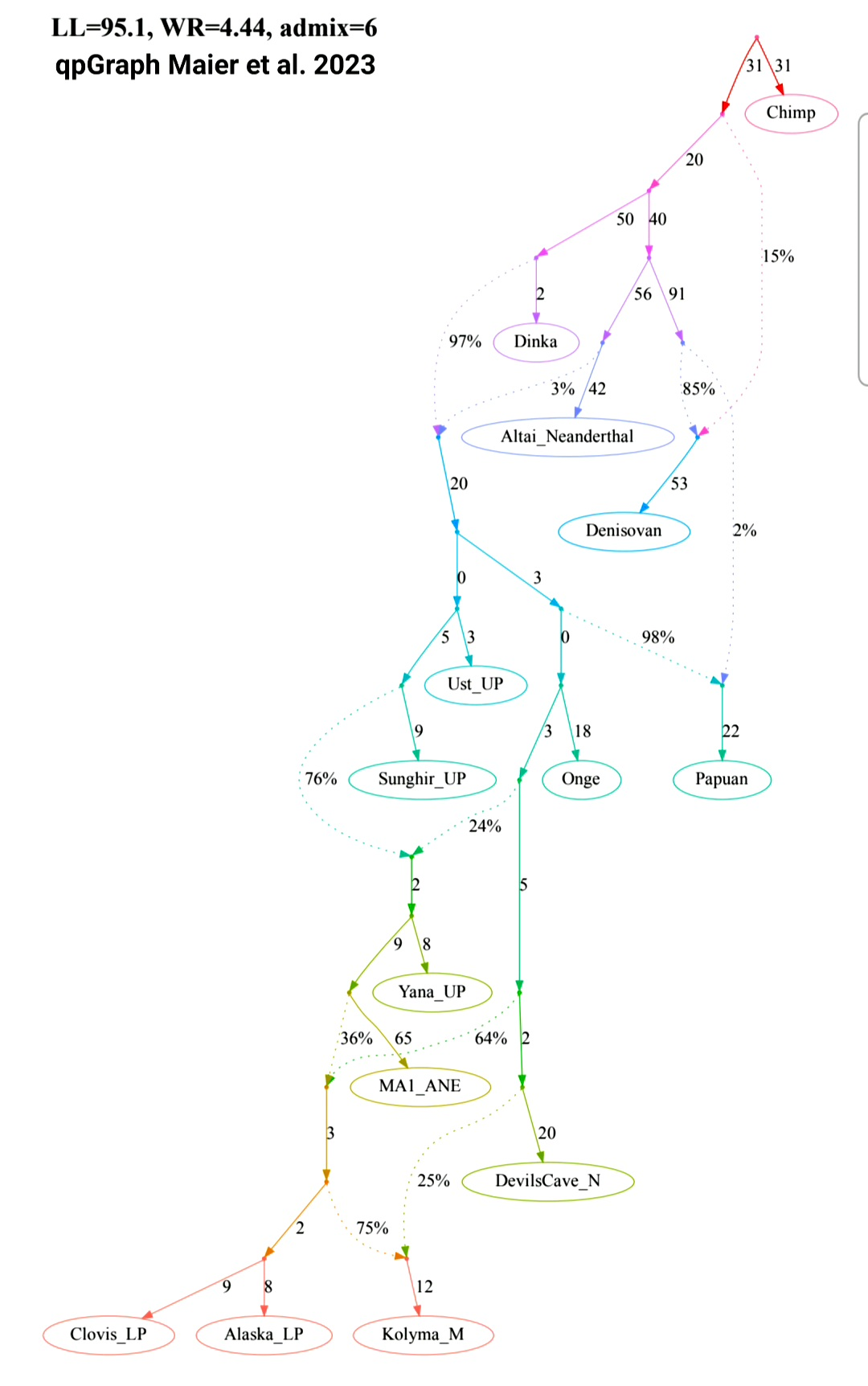
A qpGraph on the formation of Ancient Paleo-Siberians and Native American populations.

The date for the gene pool formation of Indigenous Americans ranges from 36,000 to 25,000 years ago, with their internal diverging being around 21,000 years ago, during the settlement of the Americas. Native Americans formed from the admixture of a lineage that diverged from Ancient East Asian people around 36,000 years ago somewhere in Southern China, and subsequently migrated northwards into Siberia where they merged with a Paleolithic Siberian population known as Ancient North Eurasians (ANE), deeply related to European hunter-gatherers, giving rise to both Indigenous peoples of Siberia and Ancestral Native Americans. Both Paleo-Siberians and Ancestral Native Americans derive between 32 and 44% of their ancestry from Ancient North Eurasians (ANE), and 56–68% ancestry from Ancient East Asians. Based on a 2023 mitochondrial DNA study, a subsequent wave of migration from Northern China, originating near the present-day cities of Beijing and Tianjin, occurred as recently as 9000 BCE, following a previously unknown coastal route from Asia to America.

== See also ==
- Indigenous peoples in Ecuador
- Indigenous peoples in Paraguay
- Indigenous peoples of Costa Rica
- Indigenous peoples in Argentina
- Indigenous peoples of Peru
- Indigenous peoples in Canada
- Indigenous peoples in Colombia
- Indigenous peoples in Brazil
- Indigenous peoples in Chile
- Languages of Guatemala
- Indigenous languages of the Americas
- Ancient American engineering
- Andean culture (disambiguation)

=== List of Indigenous peoples ===
- List of Greenlandic Inuit
- List of Indigenous artists of the Americas
- List of Indigenous peoples of the Americas
- List of Indigenous writers from the Americas

=== Culture ===
- Ceramics of Indigenous peoples of the Americas
- Chunkey
- Fully feathered basket
- Indian Mass
- Native American religion
- Pow wow
- Shamanism

=== Population and demographics ===
- Child development of the Indigenous peoples of the Americas
- Classification of the Indigenous peoples of the Americas
- Indigenous Movements in the Americas
- Origins of Paleoindians
- Pacific Islander
- Population history of the Indigenous peoples of the Americas

=== Central and South America ===
- Indigenous peoples of South America
- List of Mayan languages
- Society in the Spanish Colonial Americas

=== Caribbean ===
- Indigenous peoples of the Caribbean
- Indigenous peoples of Guyana
- Indigenous peoples of Suriname

=== North America ===
- Genocide of Indigenous peoples of the Americas
- History of the west coast of North America
- List of traditional territories of the Indigenous peoples of North America
- Native Americans in the United States
  - List of American Inuit
  - Native American Languages Act of 1990
  - Native American weaponry
  - Native Americans in German popular culture
  - Republic of Lakotah
- Redskin
