= Mosquito Creek =

Mosquito Creek may refer to:

- Mosquito Creek (British Columbia), a creek at North Vancouver district of British Columbia
- Mosquito Creek (Feather River), a California tributary of the North Fork Feather River
- Mosquito Creek (Iowa), a tributary of the Missouri River
- Mosquito Creek (Lake Oroville), a California tributary of the Feather River source
- Mosquito Creek (Pennsylvania), a tributary of the West Branch Susquehanna River
- Mosquito Creek, Queensland, a locality in Queensland, Australia
- Mosquito Creek (Tawana Creek), a stream in Ohio
- Mosquito Creek (South Dakota), a stream in South Dakota
- Mosquito Creek (Virginia), a tributary of Chincoteague Bay
- Mosquito Creek (Washington), a stream on the Olympic Peninsula
- Mosquito Creek (Wisconsin River tributary), a stream in Wisconsin
- Mosquito Creek Lake, reservoir in Trumbull County, northeast Ohio
