= Virginia State Route 175 =

Highway in eastern Virginia, US

State Route 175
- Chincoteague Road

Route information
- Maintained by VDOT
- Length: 10.83 mi (17.43 km)
- Existed: 1933–present

Major junctions
- West end: US 13 at Nash Corner
- East end: Main Street / Maddox Boulevard in Chincoteague

Location
- Country: United States
- State: Virginia
- Counties: Accomack

Highway system
- Virginia Routes; Interstate; US; Primary; Secondary; Byways; History; HOT lanes
← SR 174	→ SR 176

State Route 175 (SR 175) is a primary state highway in the U.S. state of Virginia. Known as Chincoteague Road, the state highway runs 10.49 miles (16.88 km) from U.S. Route 13 (US 13) at Nash Corner east to Main Street in Chincoteague. SR 175 passes through the northeastern corner of Accomack County, providing the primary access to NASA's Wallops Flight Facility and both Chincoteague Island and the Virginia portion of Assateague Island. The route travels between the mainland and Chincoteague Island along the John B. Whealton Memorial Causeway.

In 1928, SR 520 was designated to run from US 13 in Oak Hall east toward Chincoteague Island, being extended onto the island in 1930. The route was extended south along US 13 and west to a railroad crossing west of Oak Hall in 1930. SR 520 became SR 175 in the 1933 Virginia state highway renumbering. SR 175 was extended south on Main Street in Chincoteague a year later and east on Beebe Road the following year, at which time a spur route known as SR 175Y was designated onto the northern portion of Main Street. The western terminus was moved to its current location in 1947, with the section west of US 13 becoming part of SR 703. SR 175 was routed to bypass Wallops Station to the south in 1954. In 1992, the section of SR 175 in Chincoteague, along with all of SR 175Y, was transferred to the secondary system. SR 175 was rerouted to bypass Marsh Island and a swing bridge over Chincoteague Channel with a new bascule bridge further north in 2010, tying into Main Street at Maddox Boulevard. The former swing bridge was demolished and a spur off the new bridge was built to serve Marsh Island.

== Route description ==
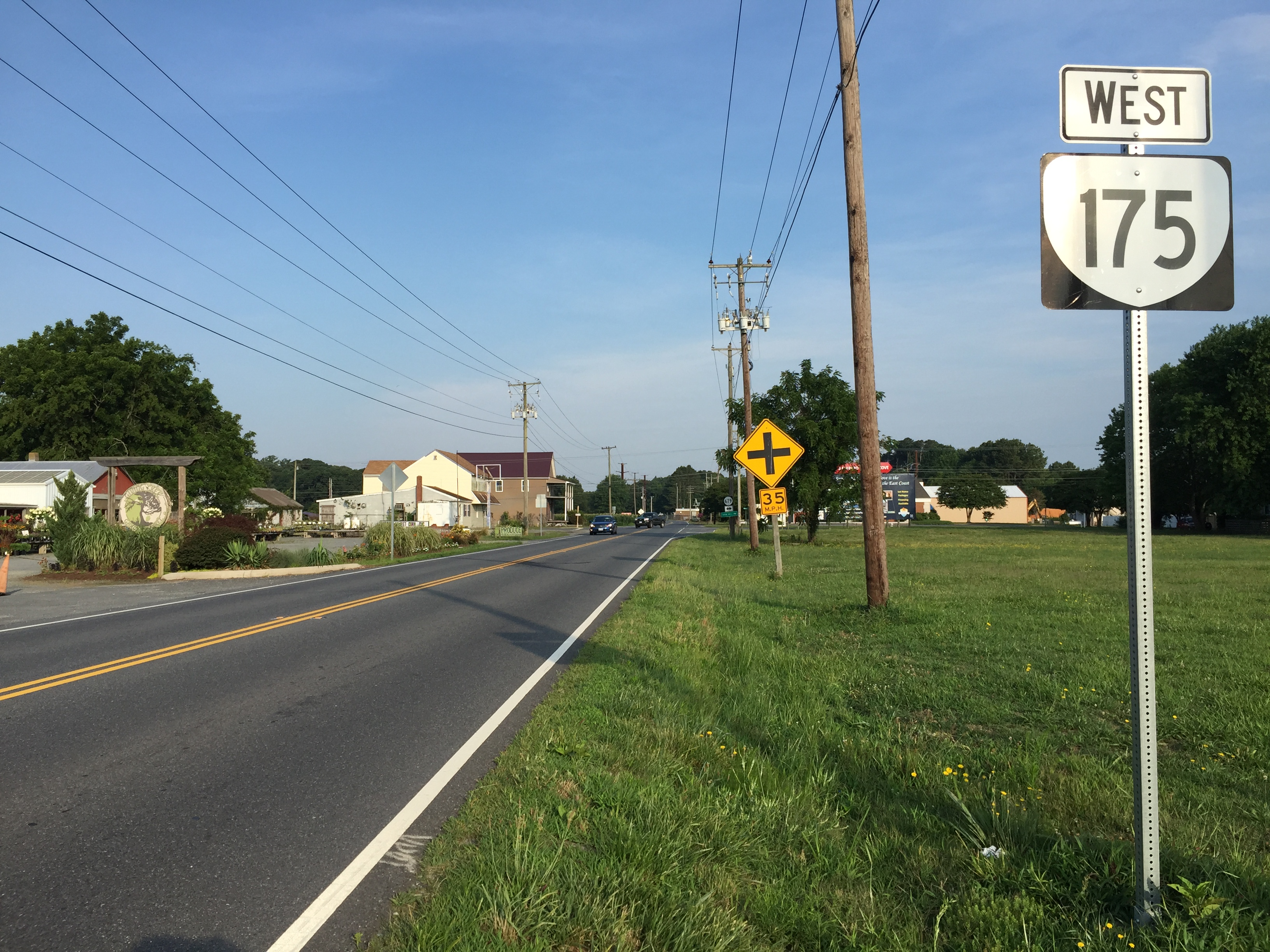
View west along SR 175 in Wattsville

SR 175 begins at an intersection with US 13 (Lankford Highway) at Nash Corner 4 miles (6.4 km) south of the Maryland state line. The state highway heads east as two-lane undivided Chincoteague Road through a mix of farmland and woodland. Upon reaching the community of Wattsville, the highway intersects SR 679 (Fleming Road) and SR 798 (Mill Dam Road). The road crosses over Wallops Pond, an impoundment of Wattsville Branch of Mosquito Creek, onto Wallops Island. SR 175 heads east, intersecting SR 798 (Atlantic Avenue) again, then curves north through Wallops Island National Wildlife Refuge and around NASA's Wallops Flight Facility, a rocket launch site operated as a subsidiary of Goddard Space Flight Center. While heading north parallel to one of the flight facility's runways, the state highway passes the NASA Visitor Center. SR 175 curves to the east as it passes the main entrance to the flight facility.

SR 175 heads east onto the John B. Whealton Memorial Causeway between the mainland and Chincoteague Island. The causeway passes over marshland adjacent to the southern end of Chincoteague Bay and includes bridges over Mosquito Creek, Cockle Creek, Queen Sound Channel, and Wire Narrows. A fifth bridge curves to the north and then east around the northern end of Marsh Island to cross Black Narrows and Chincoteague Channel onto Chincoteague Island. The bridge has a bascule span over Chincoteague Channel and lands on Chincoteague Island north of the downtown area. Marsh Island is served by a connector bridge that meets SR 175 over Black Narrows. SR 175 reaches its eastern terminus at Main Street in the town of Chincoteague. The roadway continues east as Maddox Boulevard toward Assateague Island. SR 175 serves as the access road from US 13 to both Chincoteague and the Virginia section of Assateague Island.

== History ==
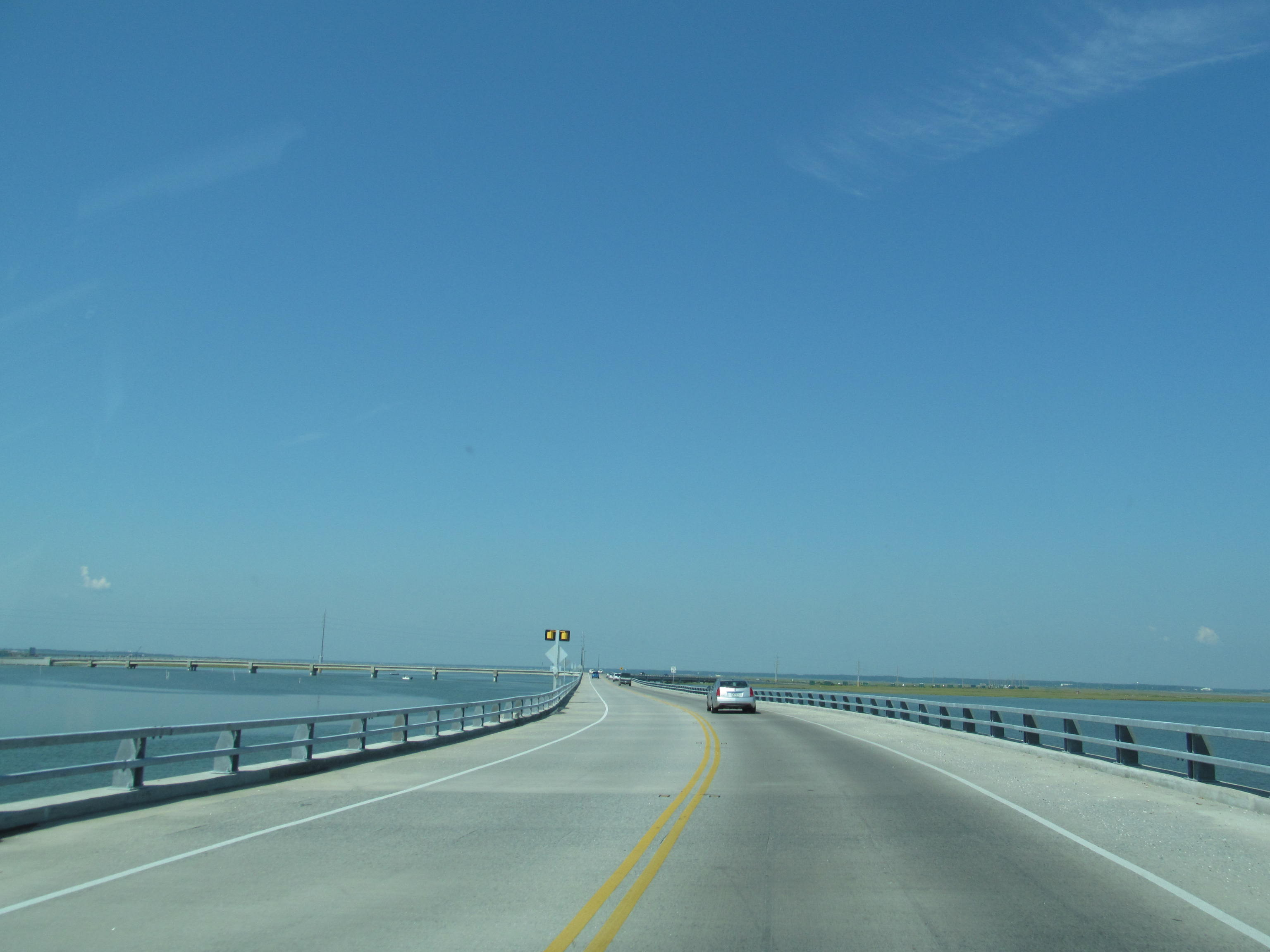
The Whealton Memorial Causeway between the mainland and Chincoteague

A causeway linking Chincoteague Island to the mainland was proposed by John B. Whealton, who formed the Chincoteague Toll Road and Bridge Company in 1919. On November 15, 1922, the causeway to Chincoteague Island was completed. Tolls were collected on the causeway until 1930. The road between US 13 in Oak Hall and Chincoteague Island became a part of the state highway system as SR 520 in August 1928. The route was extended onto Chincoteague Island in June 1930. In December of that year, SR 520 was extended south on US 13 and west along CR 107 to a railroad crossing west of Oak Hall. In the 1933 Virginia state highway renumbering, SR 520 was replaced with SR 175. In August 1934, SR 175 was extended south along Main Street in Chincoteague on the former SR 717. A year later, the route was extended east along Beebe Road to the boundary of Chincoteague. The western terminus of SR 175 was cut back to its current location at US 13 in June 1947, with an extension of SR 703 replacing the small section of the route that extended west from US 13. SR 175 was rerouted to bypass the Wallops Station facility to the south in May 1954; SR 798 was assigned to part of the former alignment. The SR 175 designation was removed from Main Street and Beebe Road in June 1992 when that stretch of road was transferred to the secondary system, leaving the eastern terminus at Main Street just east of the causeway onto the island.

In January 2007, construction began to build a new bridge to Chincoteague Island for SR 175. This new crossing was built as the old bridges were narrow and deteriorating, in addition to reducing traffic congestion in downtown Chincoteague and providing a more direct route to the island's main commercial district and Assateague Island. The project constructed a bascule bridge over Black Narrows and Chincoteague Channel that would enter the island and terminate at Main Street and Maddox Boulevard, replacing the previous crossing by way of Marsh Island that consisted of a swing bridge over the Chincoteague Channel. A connector bridge was built to serve Marsh Island. SR 175 was relocated to the new bridge in October 2010. The old bridge over Black Narrows and the swing bridge over Chincoteague Channel were demolished following the completion of the new bridge.

== Major intersections ==
The entire route is in Accomack County.

Location	mi	km	Destinations	Notes
Nash Corner	0.00	0.00	US 13 (Lankford Highway) – Norfolk, Salisbury	Western terminus
Chincoteague Bay			John B. Whealton Memorial Causeway	
Chincoteague	10.83	17.43	Main Street / Maddox Boulevard east – Assateague Island	Eastern terminus
1.000 mi = 1.609 km; 1.000 km = 0.621 mi

== SR 175Y ==
State Route 175Y
- Location: Chincoteague
- Length: 0.8 mi (1,300 m)
- Existed: 1935–1992

State Route 175Y (SR 175Y) was an eight-tenths-mile-long (1.3 km) spur route of SR 175 in Chincoteague. The route ran from SR 175 near the eastern end of the original causeway onto the island north along Main Street to the northern border of Chincoteague. When SR 175Y was designated in August 1935, it replaced a section of SR 717. The route was transferred to the secondary system in June 1992.

== See also ==
< SR 519	District 5 State Routes; 1928–1933	SR 521 >
