= Mosquito (disambiguation) =

Mosquito most commonly refers to flying insects of the family Culicidae.

Mosquito or Mosquitoes may also refer to:

== Arts and entertainment ==
- Mosquito (film), a 1995 science fiction film directed by Gary Jones
- The Mosquito (film), a 1954 West German drama film
- Mosquitoes (film), a 2025 comedy drama film
- Mosquitos (band), a New York City-based musical band
- Mosquitoes (novel), a 1927 novel by William Faulkner
- Mister Mosquito, a 2001 PlayStation 2 game

=== Albums ===
- Mosquito, a 1995 album by Michael Kulas
- Mosquito, a 1994 album by Psychotic Waltz
- Mosquito (album), by Yeah Yeah Yeahs, 2013
- Mosquitos (album), by Stan Ridgway, 1989

=== Songs ===
- "Mosquito" (song), by PinkPantheress from Heaven Knows, 2023
- "Mosquito", by Red Velvet from Summer Magic, 2017
- "Mosquito", by SR-71 from their Japan-only album Here We Go Again, 2004
- "Mosquitoes", a song by the Beths from Straight Line Was a Lie
- "The Mosquito" (song), by The Doors from Full Circle, 1972

== Places ==
=== United States ===
- Mosquito, California, in Calaveras County
- Mosquito County, original name of Orange County, Florida
- Mosquito Creek (disambiguation), various creeks in the US
- Mosquito Lagoon, Florida
- Mosquito Range, Rocky Mountains range in central Colorado
- Mosquito Pass, a high mountain pass in the Mosquito Range

=== Multiple countries ===
- Mosquito River (disambiguation)

=== Elsewhere ===
- Mosquito, Newfoundland and Labrador, a settlement in Canada
- Mosquito Coast, in Central America
- Point Mosquitos (Spanish: Punta Mosquitos or Mosquito), on the Caribbean coast of Panama
- Mosquito Mound, a volcano in Canada
- Mosquito Island, a nickname for Selirong Island in Temburong District, Brunei

== People ==
- Sam Bockarie (1964–2003), Sierra–Leonean rebel leader nicknamed "Mosquito"
- Carlos Domingos Massoni (1933–2001), Brazilian basketball player nicknamed "Mosquito"
- Coco Mosquito, stage name of Croatian musician, Gordan Muratović
- Emilia Mosquito (born 1982), Swedish film director
- Mosquito (footballer) (born 1996), Brazilian footballer
- Irving Mosquito (born 2000), Australian footballer
- Musquito or Mosquito, Indigenous Australian resistance leader
- Yvonne Mosquito (born 1964), British politician

== Transportation ==
=== Aviation ===
- ABC Mosquito, a 1916 British aircraft engine
- de Havilland Mosquito, a twin-engine British fighter-bomber during WWII
- Glasflügel Mosquito, a German-manufactured glider
- Golden Gate Mosquito, an American ultralight aircraft
- Innovator Mosquito Air, a Canadian ultralight home-built helicopter
- Mosquito Aviation XE, an ultralight home-built turbine powered helicopter
- Partenavia Mosquito, Italian, two-seat, civil, trainer aircraft
- Swedish Aerosport Mosquito, powered hang glider
- T-6 Mosquito, the designation for the North American T-6 Texan trainer when used as a combat aircraft

=== Rail ===
- Mosquito, a GWR Metropolitan Class locomotive

== Military ==
=== Aerial ===
- de Havilland Mosquito, a British Second World War aircraft
- Focke-Wulf Ta 154 Moskito, a German World War II aircraft
- P-270 Moskit, Russian cruise missile
- Spirit Mosquito, a British UCAV formerly in development by Spirit AeroSystems Belfast

=== Naval ===
- HMS Mosquito, twelve Royal Navy ships
- USS Mosquito (1775), a sloop of the Continental Navy
- USS Mosquito (1822), a barge or cutter in the West Indies Squadron
- Mosquito Fleet, several groups of ships in US naval and maritime history
- HMQS Mosquito, a torpedo boat operated by the Queensland Maritime Defence Force and the Commonwealth Naval Forces

=== Land ===
- Mosquito (missile), an Italian anti-tank guided missile which entered service in 1961

== Sports ==
- Manchester Mosquitoes, British, Australian rules football club
- The Mosquitos, nickname of the Papua New Guinea national Australian rules football team

== Other uses ==
- MOSQUITO, a cryptographic cypher algorithm
- The Mosquito, an audio device to discourage loitering

== See also ==
- El Mosquito, an Argentine newspaper
- Mesquito, a NASA sounding rocket
- Miskito (disambiguation)
- Moskito (disambiguation)
- SIG Sauer Mosquito, a .22 caliber handgun
