= Michael C. Horgan =

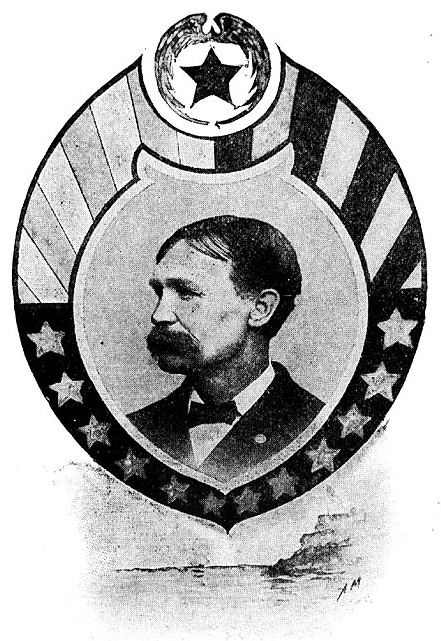
- Landsman Michael Horgan
- Born: September 17, 1846; Ireland
- Died: November 27, 1910 (aged 64)
- Burial place: Holy Cross Cemetery, Malden, Massachusetts
- Military career
- Allegiance: United States; Union
- Branch: United States Navy; Union Navy
- Service years: 1863–1868
- Rank: Landsman
- Unit: USS Tacony
- Conflicts: American Civil War • First Battle of Fort Fisher • Second Battle of Fort Fisher
- Awards: Medal of Honor

Michael C. Horgan (September 17, 1846 – November 27, 1910) was a Union Navy sailor in the American Civil War who served under the alias Martin Howard. He received the United States military's highest decoration, the Medal of Honor, for his actions during the capture of Plymouth, North Carolina.

== Biography ==
A native of Ireland, Horgan immigrated to the United States at age five. He enlisted in the U.S. Navy from the state of New York in April 1863 and was assigned as a landsman to the USS Tacony. Horgan enlisted under an assumed name, Martin Howard, and his birth year is recorded as 1843 in his military records.

In late October 1864, the Tacony steamed up the Roanoke River in North Carolina with a squadron of Union ships tasked with capturing the city of Plymouth. The CSS Albemarle had been sunk days earlier, leaving no Confederate ships to oppose the attack. Finding the Roanoke obstructed by the wreckage of sunken vessels, the squadron turned up the Middle River, from which it could lob shells over a stretch of forest and into Plymouth.

Fortifications along the river included a 9-inch artillery gun about 30 yards (27 m) from the shore. Confederate soldiers would crawl out to the gun, load it, then retreat to the safety of a bombproof shelter and, when Union ships came within range, fire the weapon by use of a long string. On October 31, Horgan and a small boat of men from the Tacony landed ashore and, under intense small arms fire, disabled the gun by "spiking" it, that is, by driving a metal spike into the touch hole. After exchanging heavy artillery fire with the squadron, the Confederates abandoned their positions and the city quickly fell. For his actions during the battle, Horgan was awarded the Medal of Honor two months later, on December 31. The medal was issued to "Martin Howard", the alias under which Horgan had enlisted. Three other men from the gun-spiking group were also awarded the medal: Landsman Henry Brutsche, Landsman Robert Graham, and Quarter Gunner James Tallentine.

In December 1864, he participated in the First Battle of Fort Fisher, North Carolina. While clearing naval mines (then known as "torpedoes") to make way for Union ironclads, Horgan was lightly wounded by flying shards of wood when a Confederate artillery shell struck nearby. The next month, at the Second Battle of Fort Fisher, he was among a party from the Tacony which joined the January 15 assault against the fort. Wounded twice during this action, Horgan spent the next eight months in a hospital.

Horgan was discharged from the Navy in April 1868, having served two terms of enlistment. He died at age 64 and was buried at Holy Cross Cemetery in Malden, Massachusetts.

== Medal of Honor citation ==
Horgan's official Medal of Honor citation reads:

Served on board the U.S.S. Tacony during the taking of Plymouth, N.C., 31 October 1864. Carrying out his duties faithfully during the capture of Plymouth, Howard distinguished himself by a display of coolness when he participated in landing and spiking a 9-inch gun while under a devastating fire from enemy musketry.

== See also ==
- List of Medal of Honor recipients
- List of American Civil War Medal of Honor recipients: G–L
