= Miskito =

Miskito may refer to:

- Miskito Coast, alternate spelling of Mosquito Coast
- Miskito people, ethnic group of the Mosquito Coast
  - Miskito Sambu, branch of Miskito people with African admixture
  - Tawira Miskito, branch of Miskito people of largely Indigenous origin
- Miskito languages, alternate name for Misumalpan languages
  - Miskito language, Misumalpan language of the Miskito people
- Miskito Coast Creole, English-based creole spoken on the Mosquito Coast
- Miskito Cays, group of small islands in the Caribbean near Nicaragua
- Miskito Governor, hereditary official in the Mosquito Kingdom
- Miskito General, hereditary official in the Mosquito Kingdom
- Miskito Admiral, hereditary official in the Mosquito Kingdom

== See also ==
- Mosquito (disambiguation)
- Moskito (disambiguation)
