= Nike-Yardbird =

Nike Yardbird was an American sounding rocket with two stages, based upon the Nike Hercules M5E1 booster and a Thiokol TE-289 Yardbird upper stage. Yardbird was an improved Thiokol XM-19 motor. The Nike Yardbird was launched 2 times from Wallops Island on Sphere Test aeronomy missions both of which were classified as failures. Information available does not state the reason for the mission failures but Astronautix lists the apogee of both missions as 10 km (6 mi) which is well below the goal of 120 km (70 mi).

== Nike Yardbird ==
Section source: Astronautix

- Type: two stage
  - Stage 1: Nike M5E1 - solid propellant rocket stage, loaded/empty mass 599/256 kg
  - Stage 2: Yardbird - solid propellant rocket stage
- Gross mass: 200 kg (440 lb)
- Height: 2.50 m (8.20 ft)
- Diameter: 0.23 m (0.75 ft)
- Thrust: 75.00 kN (16,860 lbf)
- Apogee: 120 km (70 mi)
- First date: 1961-06-01
- Last date: 1962-07-26
- Number: 2 launches
