= Hearts in Bondage =

1936 American war drama film by Lew Ayres

- DVD cover
- Directed by: Lew Ayres
- Written by: Wallace MacDonald (original story); Bernard Schubert; Olive Cooper; Karl Brown
- Produced by: Nat Levine
- Starring: James Dunn; Mae Clarke; David Manners
- Cinematography: Jack A. Marta; Ernest Miller
- Edited by: Ralph Dixon
- Music by: Hugo Riesenfeld
- Production company: Republic Pictures
- Distributed by: Republic Pictures
- Release date: August 15, 1936
- Running time: 72 minutes
- Country: United States
- Language: English

Hearts in Bondage is a 1936 American black-and-white war drama film directed by Lew Ayres for Republic Pictures. Set during the American Civil War, the film depicts the Union Navy's deliberate sinking of USS Merrimack, the Confederate States Navy's salvage and refitting of the ship as the ironclad CSS Virginia, the Union Navy's development of the ironclad USS Monitor to counter Virginia, and the subsequent engagement of the two vessels in the Battle of Hampton Roads. It also features many historical characters, including United States President Abraham Lincoln, Secretary of the Navy Gideon Welles, and Confederate States President Jefferson Davis. The fictional plot, starring James Dunn, Mae Clarke, and David Manners, pits two friends and future brothers-in-law on opposite sides of the North–South conflict, dividing their families and threatening their survival. Hearts in Bondage is notable as a rare example of a Hollywood film to depict the naval battles of the American Civil War.

== Plot ==
Lieutenant Kenneth Reynolds and his good friend, fellow naval officer Raymond Jordan, go ice-skating with their girls in anticipation of being called to war. Reynolds' beau, Constance (Connie) Jordan, who is Raymond's sister, accepts Kenneth's marriage proposal. Meanwhile, at a government war council discussing the secession of six Southern states to form the Confederacy, two officials from Virginia are asked to declare their loyalty to the Union. Captain Buchanan resigns from the Navy to join the Confederates, while Commodore Jordan remains. A similar loyalty test confronts Raymond, who does not want to be separated from his fiancée, Captain Buchanan's daughter Julie, and leaves to join the Confederates in Virginia. Kenneth decides to stay with the Union and is put in charge of USS Merrimack. When the ship is attacked by Confederate troops at Gosport Navy Yard, Kenneth receives orders to burn the ship, but defies the orders and sinks the vessel to save the hull and engines. He is court-martialed and dishonorably discharged from the Union Navy. He cannot find another job because everyone considers him a traitor, so he goes to help his uncle John Ericsson complete his new design of USS Monitor, an ironclad warship.

The Union learns that the Confederates have salvaged Merrimack and refitted her in iron as the CSS Virginia. Kenneth encourages his uncle to submit to the government his design of the ironclad Monitor, which features a unique revolving gun turret. Though the Navy has accepted the plans of Bushnell, another shipbuilder, Commodore David G. Farragut smooths things over and helps everyone see that the Monitor is a better choice to engage in battle with the enemy.

Not enough volunteers answer the call to man Monitor, so Kenneth is accepted despite his dishonorable discharge. Meanwhile, Raymond has been named third in command on the CSS Virginia. When Connie finds out that Kenneth will be fighting against her brother, she is unable to forgive him. Though Kenneth still wants to be with her, he must fulfill the call of duty.

The Battle of Hampton Roads finds Virginia attacking and sinking USS Cumberland and USS Congress in the harbor. The next day, Virginia approaches USS Minnesota and Monitor engages it in battle. Lieutenant Worden is wounded and Kenneth is put in charge of the second gun. After further exchange of gunfire, Raymond suggests that Virginia pull up alongside Monitor and board it. Through the gun hole, Kenneth sees Raymond approaching at the head of the boarding party and is distraught that he must kill him, but orders his men to fire both guns. The boarding party is repulsed and Virginia backs off. After he returns to civilian life with an honorable discharge, Kenneth tries to renew his relationship with Connie, who is grief-stricken over her brother's death. The two meet President Abraham Lincoln on their walk by the Potomac River, and the president encourages them to pursue a future of peace. Connie is comforted and resolves to renew her relationship with Kenneth.

== Cast ==
- James Dunn as Lieutenant Kenneth Reynolds
- Mae Clarke as Constance Jordan
- David Manners as Raymond Jordan
- Charlotte Henry as Julie Buchanan
- Henry B. Walthall as Captain Buchanan
- Fritz Leiber, Sr. as Captain John Ericsson
- George Irving as Commodore Jordan
- Irving Pichel as Secretary of the Navy Gideon Welles
- J.M. Kerrigan as Paddy Callahan
- Frank McGlynn Sr. as Abraham Lincoln
- Ben Alexander as Eggleston
- Oscar Apfel as Captain Gilman
- Clay Clement as Lieutenant Worden
- Edward Gargan as 'Mac' McPherson
- Russell Hicks as Senator Pillsbury
- George "Gabby" Hayes as Ezra
- Douglas Wood as Commodore David G. Farragut
- Bodil Rosing as Mrs. Adams
- Erville Alderson as Jefferson Davis
- John Hyams as Bushnell
- Etta McDaniel as Mammy
- Warner Richmond as Bucko
- Lloyd Ingraham as Timekeeper
- Ethan Laidlaw as Seaman (uncredited)

== Production ==
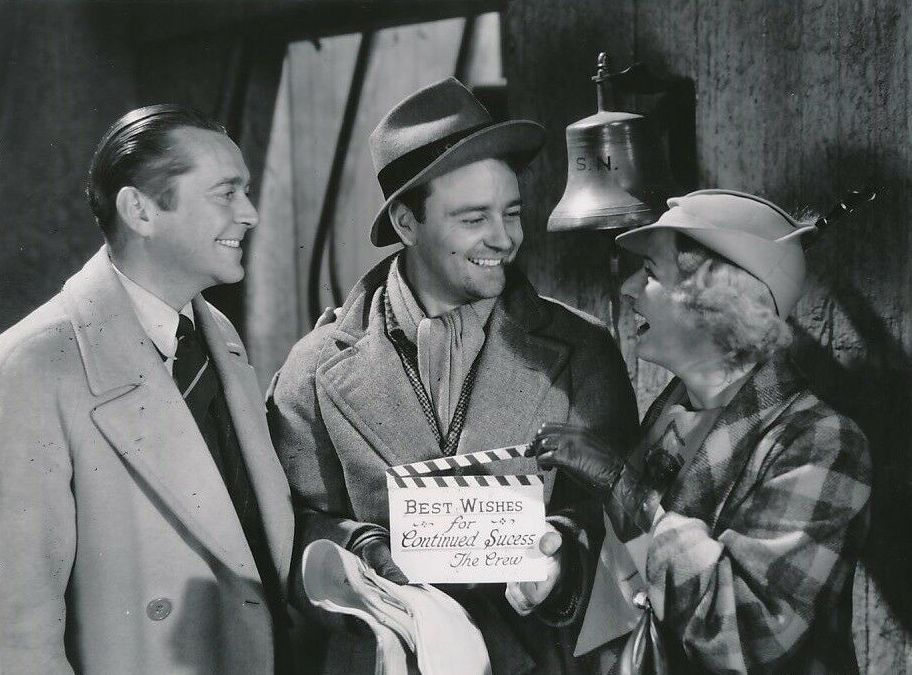
(L. to r.) James Dunn, Lew Ayres, and Mae Clarke on the set of Hearts in Bondage

=== Development ===
As a genre, the American Civil War had receded from Hollywood filmmaking after World War I; Stokes counts less than a dozen films on the subject in the 1920s and 1930s, with Gone with the Wind being the only box-office success. Films depicting naval battles of the war have been rare. Thomas notes that Hearts in Bondage was the first film to depict an American Civil War naval battle since the 1914 silent film The Southerners.

The film was produced under the working title The Glory Parade. The screenplay by Bernard Schubert, Olive Cooper, and Karl Brown was adapted from an original story by Wallace MacDonald. Lt. Franklyn Adreon, USMC (credited onscreen as Andreon) served as technical supervisor.

This was the only film directed by actor Lew Ayres. Ayres had negotiated with Republic Pictures to star in two of their films in return for allowing him to direct one. The two Republic films in which he starred were The Leathernecks Have Landed (1936) and King of the Newsboys (1938).

A title card at the start of the film provides this dedication:

This is a story of ships and men – iron ships and men of iron – the monitors of liberty. To the first Monitor of them all, to the gallant men who fought for and against her, this picture is respectfully dedicated.

=== Casting ===
James Dunn had broken his seven-year studio contract with Fox Film in 1935. He signed a two-picture deal with Republic in 1936, with Hearts in Bondage being his first starring turn.

Frank McGlynn Sr., who plays President Abraham Lincoln, first portrayed the president in the 1918 play Abraham Lincoln by John Drinkwater; he would go on to portray Lincoln in a total of seven Hollywood films.

With a cast of "72 important speaking parts", the production also employed more than 1,000 extras in period costume.

=== Filming ===
Filming took place from March 16 to early April 1936. A 1936 news item noted that the production used 84 different studio sets for the film's 356 scenes. Nearly half of these sets were exterior stages set up for action sequences. An article in the trade journal Refrigeration Engineering described the refrigerated sound stage used for the ice-skating scene, which required more than 85 tons of refrigeration to offset the heat of the arc lights needed for filming. An "ice slinger" produced authentic-looking ice and snow that "drifts, packs, whirls in a breeze and can be made into real snowballs". Fine river sand was laid directly on the floor and covered with ice-cold water to produce a smooth skating surface. The actors' breath is plainly visible in the low-temperature environment. Dunn reportedly engaged in figure skating to keep warm between takes on the 22 °F set.

The naval battles were staged using scale models constructed by the studio's special-effects team under the direction of Bud Thackery.

== Release ==
Hearts in Bondage was released on August 15, 1936.

The film's runtime was later cut from 72 minutes to 54 minutes for television release.

== Critical reception ==
New York's Daily News gave the film three stars, describing it as "vivid and arresting, if not completely authentic". It noted that there is no historical record of a Kenneth Reynolds assisting John Ericsson in his design of the USS Monitor, but it appreciated the "sentimentality" which this plot device contributes to the story.

The Oklahoma News called the film "one of the better dips into Civil War history as a gesture toward modern cinema pleasure". It explained that supporters of both the North and South would leave the film thinking that their side won due to "the triumph of diplomacy and photography". This review called the battle scenes generally accurate historically, aside from the sailors standing on the deck of the Minnesota cheering for the Monitor during the fight.

An Associated Press news item commended the "unexpectedly good" on-screen action, though it felt the film was "handicapped by an unexciting title".

Contemporary reviews praised the battle scenes but were lukewarm on the fictional elements. In his 1996 book The Blue and the Gray on the Silver Screen, Kinnard writes:

Hearts in Bondage contains some capable artists, a plot that sometimes intrigues, plenty of production and numerous actionful moments. And yet it never jells as a gripping picture except possibly in its naval battle episodes. ... This will be labeled as a historical costume picture, and possibly the weakest of the current crop.

TV Guide, which gives the film 2 out of 5 stars, writes off the non-historical sequences as "a standard soap opera plot". AllMovie, which gives the film 2 1/2 out of 5 stars, asserts that Dunn and Clarke are both miscast. It does, however, laud director Ayres, who "performs miracles on a tiny budget", and the special-effects team, led by Howard and Theodore Lydecker, who constructed the scale models of the ironclads used in the "exciting and convincing" battle scenes. Reinhart opines that while Frank McGlynn Sr. provides a close likeness to Abraham Lincoln, his scenes fall short because they are not based on historical fact.

== Legacy ==
Republic Pictures contributed footage from the battle scenes between CSS Virginia and USS Monitor, as well as scenes relating to the start of the Civil War, for inclusion in the 1939 documentary Land of Liberty.

The 1991 television movie Ironclads, produced by Ted Turner, also depicts the battle between Virginia and Monitor.

== See also ==
- List of films and television shows about the American Civil War

== General sources ==
- Kinnard, Roy (1996). The Blue and the Gray on the Silver Screen: More Than Eighty Years of Civil War Movies. Carol Publishing Group. ISBN 9781559723831.
- Nollen, Scott Allen (2016). The Making and Influence of 'I Am a Fugitive from a Chain Gang'. McFarland. ISBN 9780786466771.
- Pitts, Michael R. (2012). Western Movies: A Guide to 5,105 Feature Films (2nd ed.). McFarland. ISBN 9780786463725.
- Reinhart, Mark S. (2009). Abraham Lincoln on Screen: Fictional and Documentary Portrayals on Film and Television. McFarland. ISBN 9780786452613.
- Rosberg, Nels H. (May 1936). "Refrigeration in the Movies". Refrigeration Engineering. 31 (5).
- Stokes, Melvyn (2013). Hollywood Film: From the Revolution to the 1960s. A&C Black. ISBN 9781441177476.
- Thomas, Tony (1988). The Cinema of the Sea: A Critical Survey and Filmography, 1925-1986. McFarland. ISBN 9780899503424.
- Wills, Brian Steel (2011). Gone with the Glory: The Civil War in Cinema. Rowman & Littlefield. ISBN 9781461739579.
