= Las Flores Partido =

Las Flores Partido de Las Flores
- Department
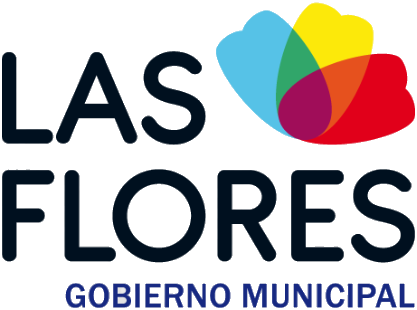
- Flag Logo

- location of Las Flores Partido in Buenos Aires Province
- Coordinates: 36°02′S 59°06′W
- Country: Argentina
- Established: December 25, 1839
- Founder: Juan Manuel de Rosas
- Seat: Las Flores

Government
  - Intendant: Alberto César Gelene (PJ)

Area
  - Total: 3,340 km^{2} (1,290 sq mi)

Population
  - Total: 23,551
  - Density: 7.05/km^{2} (18.3/sq mi)
- Demonym: florense
- Postal Code: B7800
- IFAM: BUE069
- Area Code: 02244
- Website: http://www.lasflores.gov.ar/

Las Flores Partido is a partido of Buenos Aires Province in Argentina.

The provincial subdivision has a population of about 23,000 inhabitants in an area of 3,340 km^{2} (1,290 sq mi), and its capital city is Las Flores, which is 186 km (116 mi) from Buenos Aires. It is connected to the rest of the province by National Route 3 and Provincial Routes RP 30, RP 61 and RP 63.

== Economy ==
The economy of Las Flores partido is dominated by agriculture. The mainstays of agricultural production in the region are arable crops, cattle, and dairy farming.

== Settlements ==
- Las Flores
- Coronel Boerr
- El Trigo
- Pardo
- Rosas
- PLaza Montero
- El Gualichu
- La Porteña
- Vilela
- El Mosquito
- Harosteguy
- Estrugamou
- Pago de Oro
- El Despunte
- El Tropezón
- Sol de Mayo
- El Toro
