= Peter I of the Miskito nation =

Peter I
- King of the Miskito
- Reign: 1729–1739
- Predecessor: Jeremy II
- Successor: Edward I

Peter I was a ruler of the Miskito kingdom, 1729–1739.

He came to power as a result of the death of his brother, his predecessor, probably Jeremy II. Another official, called the governor had died at the same time, and as a result there was a civil war that resulted in the loss of property belonging to some of the English traders in the area. Peter wrote to the governor of Jamaica to seek commissions, signed with the Great Seal of Jamaica for himself and for two officials, a "governor" to control the south and a "general" to control the north.
