= Patrick Colbert =

- Born: 1842; Ireland
- Died: January 19, 1877 (aged 34–35); Detroit, Michigan
- Burial place: Mount Elliott Cemetery
- Military career
- Allegiance: United States of America
- Branch: United States Navy
- Rank: Coxswain
- Unit: USS Commodore Hull
- Conflicts: Capture of Plymouth
- Awards: Medal of Honor

Coxswain Patrick Colbert (1842 to January 19, 1877) was an Irish soldier who served in the United States Navy during the American Civil War.

Colbert received the United States' highest award for bravery during combat, the Medal of Honor, for his action aboard the ferry USS Commodore Hull during the Capture of Plymouth on 31 October 1864. He was honored with the award on 31 December 1864.

== Biography ==
Colbert was born in Ireland in 1842. He enlisted into the United States Navy. He died on 19 January 1877 and his remains are interred at the Mount Elliott Cemetery in Michigan.

== Medal of Honor citation ==
Served on board the U.S.S. Commodore Hull at the capture of Plymouth, 31 October 1864.

== See also ==
- List of American Civil War Medal of Honor recipients: A–F
