= Moskito =

Moskito may refer to:

- Mosquito Island
- Comte AC-12 Moskito, Swiss light touring airplane
- Focke-Wulf Ta 154 Moskito, German night fighter

== See also ==
- Mosquito (disambiguation)
- Miskito (disambiguation)
