= James Tallentine =

American sailor (1845–1865)

- Civil War era Navy Medal of Honor
- Born: 1840; England, United Kingdom
- Died: January 15, 1865 (aged 24–25); Fort Fisher, North Carolina
- Military career
- Allegiance: United States of America; Union
- Branch: United States Navy; Union Navy
- Rank: Quarter Gunner
- Unit: USS Tacony (1863)
- Conflicts: American Civil War • Second Battle of Fort Fisher • Capture of Plymouth
- Awards: Medal of Honor

Quarter Gunner James Tallentine aka Tallentire (1840 – January 15, 1865) was a Union Navy sailor who fought in the American Civil War. Tallentine received his country's highest award for bravery during combat, the Medal of Honor, for his action in the Capture of Plymouth, North Carolina, while serving on the USS Tacony. He was posthumously honored with the award after his death in the Second Battle of Fort Fisher.

== Biography ==
Tallentine was born in England in 1840. He died on 15 January 1865 during the Second Battle of Fort Fisher, the Lieutenant commander of the USS Tacony, W. T. Truxtun, wrote in his report of the battle to the United States Secretary of the Navy, Gideon Welles, that Tallentine "...ever foremost in the discharge of his duties, reached the top of the parapet, under a murderous fire, only to fall inside the fortifications, giving a valuable life to his country."

His home was recorded in Baltimore, Maryland.

== Medal of Honor citation ==
Citation: Served as quarter gunner on board the U.S.S. Tacony during the taking of Plymouth, N.C., 31 October 1864. Carrying out his duties faithfully during the capture of Plymouth, Tallentine distinguished himself by a display of coolness when he participated in landing and spiking a 9-inch gun while under devastating fire from enemy musketry. Tallentine later gave his life while courageously engaged in storming Fort Fisher, 15 January 1865.

== See also ==
- List of American Civil War Medal of Honor recipients: T–Z
