= Las Flores, Buenos Aires =

City in Buenos Aires Province, Argentina

Las Flores
- City
- Flag

- Location in Argentina
- Coordinates: 36°0′50″S 59°06′00″W
- Country: Argentina
- Province: Buenos Aires
- Partido: Las Flores
- Founded: March 25, 1856
- Elevation: 36 m (118 ft)

Population (2022 census [INDEC])
  - Total: 26,651
- CPA Base: B 7200
- Area code: +54 2244

Las Flores is a city in the province of Buenos Aires, Argentina, and the only city in Las Flores Partido. It had a population of about 26,000 at the 2022 census [INDEC]. It is located 187 km from Buenos Aires City. The main economic activities in the area are agriculture and cattle breeding.

It is served by Las Flores Airport, a rural airport 4 kilometres (2 mi) south of the city.

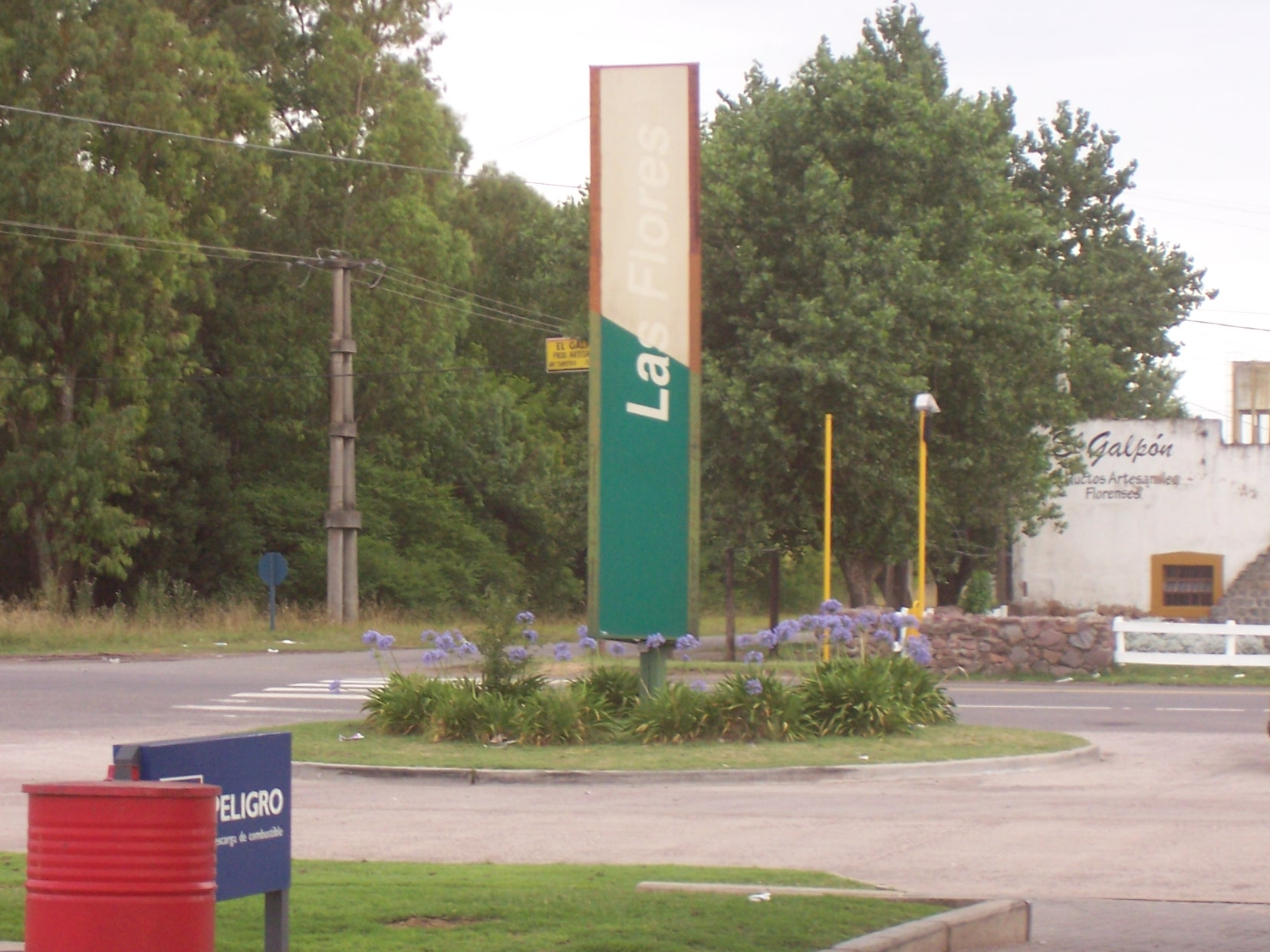
Las Flores sign

== Climate ==
Climate data for Las Flores, Buenos Aires Province (1991–2020, extremes 1961–present)
Month	Jan	Feb	Mar	Apr	May	Jun	Jul	Aug	Sep	Oct	Nov	Dec	Year
Record high °C (°F)	41.8 (107.2)	39.5 (103.1)	38.0 (100.4)	33.5 (92.3)	31.0 (87.8)	26.0 (78.8)	29.0 (84.2)	32.5 (90.5)	33.0 (91.4)	35.2 (95.4)	36.4 (97.5)	39.8 (103.6)	41.8 (107.2)
Mean daily maximum °C (°F)	29.7 (85.5)	28.4 (83.1)	26.2 (79.2)	22.1 (71.8)	18.1 (64.6)	14.7 (58.5)	13.9 (57.0)	16.5 (61.7)	18.4 (65.1)	21.4 (70.5)	25.0 (77.0)	28.4 (83.1)	21.9 (71.4)
Daily mean °C (°F)	22.6 (72.7)	21.4 (70.5)	19.4 (66.9)	15.4 (59.7)	12.0 (53.6)	9.0 (48.2)	8.1 (46.6)	10.2 (50.4)	12.1 (53.8)	15.4 (59.7)	18.4 (65.1)	21.2 (70.2)	15.4 (59.7)
Mean daily minimum °C (°F)	15.2 (59.4)	14.7 (58.5)	13.0 (55.4)	9.7 (49.5)	6.8 (44.2)	4.1 (39.4)	3.2 (37.8)	4.8 (40.6)	6.4 (43.5)	9.4 (48.9)	11.9 (53.4)	14.1 (57.4)	9.4 (48.9)
Record low °C (°F)	3.2 (37.8)	1.2 (34.2)	0.5 (32.9)	−4.7 (23.5)	−7.6 (18.3)	−9.0 (15.8)	−9.3 (15.3)	−6.5 (20.3)	−6.0 (21.2)	−5.5 (22.1)	−3.9 (25.0)	0.0 (32.0)	−9.3 (15.3)
Average precipitation mm (inches)	98.3 (3.87)	104.5 (4.11)	118.8 (4.68)	105.9 (4.17)	61.4 (2.42)	52.5 (2.07)	49.9 (1.96)	57.1 (2.25)	65.4 (2.57)	102.6 (4.04)	92.7 (3.65)	71.6 (2.82)	980.7 (38.61)
Average precipitation days (≥ 0.1 mm)	7.6	7.1	7.8	8.1	6.3	6.6	6.3	5.9	6.6	9.0	8.2	7.7	87.1
Average relative humidity (%)	69.3	73.7	77.4	79.4	82.1	82.2	81.8	79.3	77.5	76.2	72.1	68.5	76.6
Mean monthly sunshine hours	279.0	243.0	238.7	192.0	164.3	141.0	145.7	179.8	189.0	220.1	249.0	279.0	2,520.6
Mean daily sunshine hours	9.0	8.6	7.7	6.4	5.3	4.7	4.7	5.8	6.3	7.1	8.3	9.0	6.9
Percentage possible sunshine	64.3	65.1	60.4	52.4	52.6	46.4	48.5	56.9	51.2	52.8	58.2	59.5	55.7
Source: Servicio Meteorológico Nacional (percent sun 1991–2000)
