= Wallops Island National Wildlife Refuge =

United States National Wildlife Refuge in Virginia

- IUCN category IV (habitat/species management area)
- Location within Virginia Location within the United States
- Location: Wallops Island, Accomack County, Virginia, United States
- Nearest city: Chincoteague, Virginia
- Coordinates: 37°53′50″N 75°26′59″W
- Area: 373 acres (1.51 km^{2})
- Established: 1975
- Governing body: U.S. Fish and Wildlife Service
- Website: Wallops Island National Wildlife Refuge

The Wallops Island National Wildlife Refuge is a National Wildlife Refuge located on Wallops Island, Virginia; the refuge was created on July 10, 1975, with the transfer of 373 acres (1.51 km^{2}) of land from the National Aeronautics and Space Administration, and is administered by the United States Fish and Wildlife Service (FWS) along with Chincoteague National Wildlife Refuge (FWS). Much of the property is marshy, and there is also a sea-level fen on the island.

== History, geography, and management ==
The refuge is adjacent to the Wallops Flight Facility of the National Aeronautics and Space Administration (NASA), and crowd have gathered along the beaches of the refuge to watch rockets launch from the spaceport.

The NWR contains mostly salt marsh and woodland, and also includes the "Lucky Boy" sea-level fen, a rare geographic feature along the Atlantic coast. The refuge hosts northern harriers, eagles, and great horned owls, as well as various migratory birds.

NASA and the FWS's predecessor entered into a "noninterference/nonexclusive use agreement" in 1971; under the agreement, the FWS managed, but did not own, approximately 3,000 acres of land and marshland on the Wallops Island. NASA transferred 373 acres to the ownership of the FWS in 1975, and the FWS continued to manage the remaining 3,000 acres of land under renewals of the 1971 agreement with NASA until around 2006, when the agreement was not renewed. NASA, the FWS, and the Marine Science Consortium entered into a new collaborative agreement in 2011.

The refuge is not staffed by FWS personnel and is not actively managed, although the A&N Electric Cooperative (and previously Delmarva Power) maintains their power line right-of-way by removing certain vegetation, such as non-native autumn olive trees.

The refuge is closed to the public with the exception of deer hunting; hunts of white-tailed deer was authorized beginning in 2002 in an attempt to control local deer populations and prevent overbrowsing, reduce deer–vehicle collisions along Virginia State Route 175, and prevent deer collisions with aircraft at NASA's Wallops Flight Facility.
