= Las Flores Airport =

Airport in Argentina

Las Flores Airport Aerodromo Las Flores
- IATA: none; ICAO: SAEL

Summary
- Airport type: Public
- Serves: Las Flores, Argentina
- Elevation AMSL: 125 ft / 38 m
- Coordinates: 36°04′02″S 59°6′15″W

Map
- Location of airport in Argentina

Runways
Direction	Length		Surface
Direction	m	ft	Surface
02/20	1,000	3,281	Grass
09/27	1,150	3,773	Grass
- Source: Landings.com Google Maps FallingRain

Las Flores Airport (Spanish: Aerodromo Las Flores, ICAO: SAEL) is a rural airport serving Las Flores, a town in the Buenos Aires Province of Argentina. The airport is 5 kilometres (3 mi) south of the town.

There is a major highway intersection close to the north corner of the airport. Runway 02/20 length includes a 145 metres (476 ft) displaced threshold on Runway 20.

The General Belgrano VOR (Ident: GBE) is located 36.5 nautical miles (68 km) east-northeast of the airport.

== See also ==
- Transport in Argentina
- List of airports in Argentina
