= Chincoteague Bay Field Station =

Residential, environmental learning center and field station in Virginia

- Predecessor: Marine Science Consortium
- Type: Residential, environmental learning center and field station
- Location: Virginia
- Coordinates: 37°56′05″N 75°28′58″W
- Website: www.cbfieldstation.org

Chincoteague Bay Field Station is a residential, environmental learning center and field station located on the Eastern Shore of Virginia. The Field Station offers programs for all ages, including among others school programs, summer camps, college courses, research opportunities, Road Scholar programs, family camps, community events, homeschool programs, and Boy Scout and Girl Scout badging.

Formerly the Marine Science Consortium, the Field Station has campuses on Wallops Island, VA, and Greenbackville, VA.
