= Mosquito River =

There are several rivers named Mosquito River.

== Brazil ==
- Mosquito River (Minas Gerais)
- Mosquito River (Tocantins)
- Mosquito River (Pardo River tributary)

== United States ==
- Mosquito River (Michigan)

== See also ==
- Mosquito (disambiguation)
