= Capture of Plymouth =

Coordinates: 35.86648°N 76.7519°W

- Part of the American Civil War
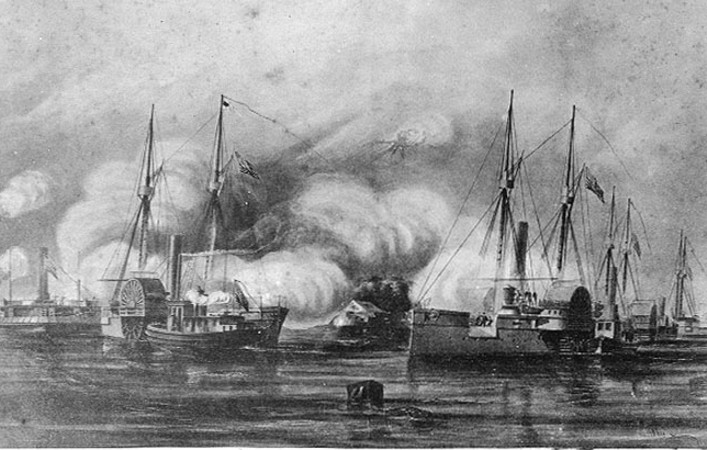
- "Capture of Plymouth, N.C. Oct. 1864" by Alexander C. Stuart.
Date	October 29–31, 1864
Location	Plymouth, North Carolina, Roanoke River, Middle River
Result	United States victory

Belligerents
United States	(Confederate States of America) Confederate States

Commanders and leaders
William H. Macomb; William B. Cushing	unknown

Strength
9 gunboats 1 torpedo boat	3,500; 22 artillery pieces 3 shore batteries

Casualties and losses
6 killed 9 wounded 3 gunboats damaged	37 captured 22 artillery pieces captured 3 shore batteries captured

The Capture of Plymouth was a battle of the American Civil War, fought in October 1864. Following the sinking of CSS Albemarle during a commando raid led by Lieutenant William B. Cushing, Union naval forces attacked Plymouth, North Carolina, which was defended by Confederate artillery. After three days of fighting, the Confederates retreated from the area, allowing the Union navy to land men and occupy the town.

== Order of battle ==
United States Navy:

- USS Wyalusing, gunboat, 1,173 tons, 14 guns
- USS Shamrock, gunboat, 974 tons, 11 guns, flagship
- USS Otsego, gunboat, 974 tons, 10 guns
- USS Tacony, gunboat, 974 tons, 9 guns
- USS Chicopee, gunboat, 974 tons, 10 guns
- USS Commodore Hull, gunboat, 376 tons, 6 guns
- USS Valley City, gunboat, 190 tons, 4 guns
- USS Whitehead, gunboat, 136 tons, 1 gun
- USS Bazely, gunboat, 50 tons
- USS Belle, torpedo boat, 52 tons, 2 guns, 1 spar torpedo

== See also ==
- Naval battles of the American Civil War
