= USS Tacony (1863) =

Gunboat of the United States Navy

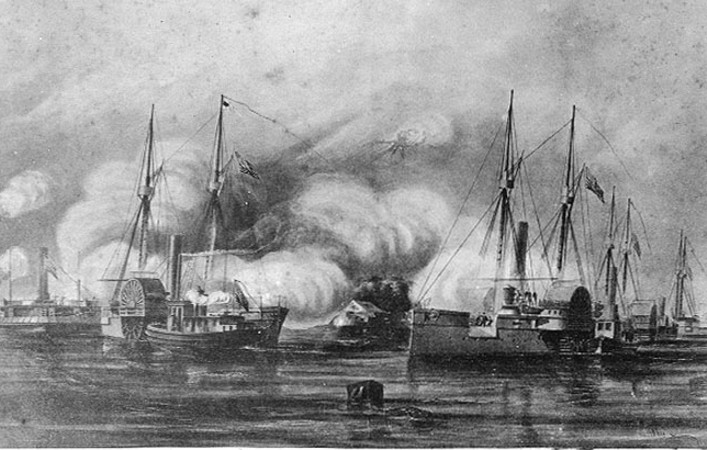
- USS Tacony (far left) attacking Plymouth, North Carolina

History

United States
- Name: USS Tacony
- Namesake: A section of northeastern Philadelphia on the bank of the Delaware River
- Builder: Philadelphia Navy Yard
- Laid down: Date unknown
- Launched: 7 May 1863
- Commissioned: 12 February 1864 at Philadelphia, Pennsylvania
- Decommissioned: 7 October 1867 at Portsmouth, New Hampshire
- Stricken: 1868 (est.)
- Fate: Sold, 26 August 1868
- Notes: Double ended ship

General characteristics
- Class & type: Sassacus-class gunboat
- Displacement: 974 tons
- Length: 205 ft (62 m)
- Beam: 35 ft (11 m)
- Draft: 8 ft 10 in (2.69 m)
- Depth of hold: 11 ft 6 in (3.51 m)
- Propulsion: Steam engine, side wheel-propelled
- Speed: 15 knots (28 km/h; 17 mph)
- Complement: 145
- Armament: 2 × 11 in (280 mm) Dahlgren smoothbore guns; 3 × 9 in (230 mm) Dahlgren smoothbore guns; 1 × 24-pounder howitzer; 2 × 12-pounder guns; 1 × brass fieldpiece

USS Tacony was a double-ended, side-wheel steamboat acquired by the Union Navy during the third year of the American Civil War. She was outfitted as a heavy gunboat with powerful guns and used in the Union blockade of the waterways of the Confederate States of America.

== Service history ==
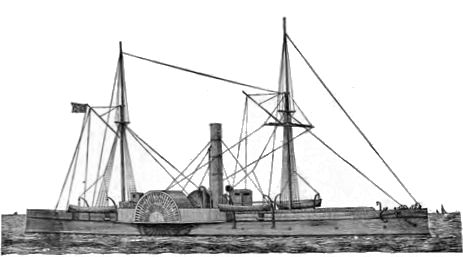
Tacony

Built by the Philadelphia Navy Yard, Tacony – the first ship to be so named by the U.S. Navy – was launched on 7 May 1863; sponsored by Miss Ellie M. Wells, daughter of Lieutenant Commander Clark H. Wells, the captain of the yard at Philadelphia; and commissioned there on 12 February 1864, Lt. Comdr. William T. Truxtun in command. The double-ender was assigned to the East Gulf Blockading Squadron and sailed south from Philadelphia, Pennsylvania soon thereafter, bound for Key West, Florida. She reached Newport News, Virginia, on the 15th and entered the Norfolk Navy Yard for repairs to her steering machinery. While the steamer was undergoing this yard work, a dispatch arrived reassigning her to the North Atlantic Blockading Squadron.

She departed Hampton Roads before dawn on the morning of 27 February, bound for the North Carolina sounds to strengthen Union forces afloat in those dangerous waters against the attacks by the Confederate ironclad ram Albemarle, then reportedly nearing completion up the Roanoke River. But for a brief run—via Norfolk, Virginia – to Washington, D.C. for repair, she served in the sounds until after the destruction of Albemarle on the night of 27 and 28 October. On 31 October 1864, the ship participated in the capture of Plymouth, North Carolina. Four sailors from the Tacony were awarded the Medal of Honor for going ashore and disabling a Confederate artillery gun while under heavy fire during this action. The men were Landsman Henry Brutsche, Landsman Robert Graham, Landsman Michael C. Horgan, and Quarter Gunner James Tallentine.

In December, Tacony left the sounds to join the force Rear Admiral David D. Porter was assembling to destroy the defenses of Wilmington, North Carolina; and she participated in the abortive attack against Fort Fisher on Christmas Eve and Christmas Day. She was part of the powerful fleet which Porter led back to Fort Fisher in mid-January 1865, and she supported the effort which finally compelled that valuable Confederate stronghold to surrender on the 15th. She also participated in the attack against Fort Anderson late in the month. The ship continued blockade duty through the collapse of the Confederacy and then sailed north.

She was decommissioned at Boston, Massachusetts on 21 June 1865 for repairs and Recommissioned on 16 September 1865 and stationed at Vera Cruz, Mexico, to observe the events surrounding the abdication and execution of Maximilian I, Emperor of Mexico on 19 June 1867. She was decommissioned for the final time at Portsmouth, New Hampshire. Tacony remained in ordinary until 26 August 1868 when she was sold. No trace of her subsequent career has been found.
