= Mosquito Creek (Wisconsin River tributary) =

River in Wisconsin, U.S.

Coordinates: 44°25′33″N 89°47′28″W

Mosquito Creek is a stream in the U.S. state of Wisconsin. It is a tributary to the Wisconsin River.

Mosquito Creek was named for the swarms of mosquitoes in the wetlands along its course.
