= Mosquito Creek (Tawana Creek tributary) =

Stream in Ohio, U.S.

Mosquito Creek is a stream in the U.S. state of Ohio. The 11.5-mile (18.5 km) long stream is a confluence of the Mahoning River.

Mosquito Creek was descriptively named for the mosquitos which were once frequent there. Native Americans called this creek the Tawawa. The creek runs from SE of Warren, Ohio, to Mosquito Creek Lake in Cortland, Ohio. The exact geographical location of the beginning of Mosquito Creek is 41.17690° N, 80.76242° W.

== See also ==
- List of rivers of Ohio
