= List of naval battles of the American Civil War =

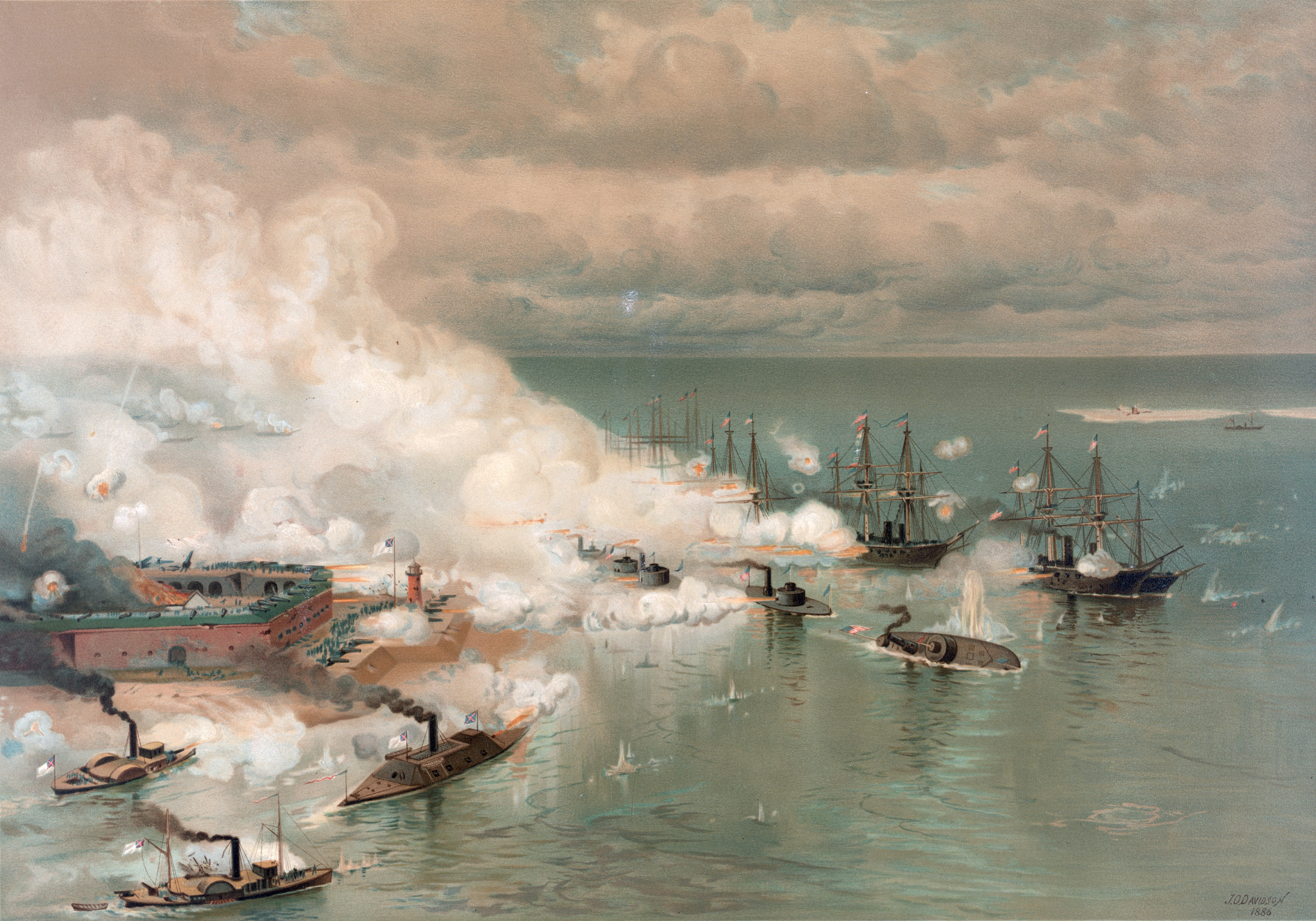
The Battle of Mobile Bay, by Louis Prang

The naval battles of the American Civil War, fought between the Union and the Confederacy, changed the foundations of naval warfare with the first use of ironclads and submarines, and the introduction of newer and more powerful naval artillery.

The first shots of the naval war were fired on April 12, 1861, during the Battle of Fort Sumter, by the US Revenue Cutter Service cutter USRC Harriet Lane. The final shots were fired on June 22, 1865, by the Confederate raider CSS Shenandoah in the Bering Strait, more than two months after General Robert E. Lee's surrender of the Confederate Army.

== Significant battles ==
=== Hampton Roads ===
One of the most important and famous naval battles of the American Civil War was the clash of the ironclads, between USS Monitor and CSS Virginia at the Battle of Hampton Roads. The battle took place on March 8, 1862, and lasted for several hours, resulting in a tactical draw. These revolutionary new warships were protected by the thick armor plating that gives them the name ironclad, which prevented any lasting damage to either ship.

=== New Orleans ===
The battle of Forts Jackson and St. Philip in 1862 can be divided into two parts: a mostly-ineffective bombardment of the Confederate-held forts by the raft-mounted mortars, and the successful passage of the forts by much of Farragut's fleet on the night of April 24. During the passage, one Federal warship was lost and three others turned back, while the Confederate gunboats were virtually obliterated. The subsequent capture of the city, achieved with no further significant opposition, was a serious, even fatal, blow from which the Confederacy never recovered.

=== First Charleston ===
A second great naval battle occurred at Charleston, South Carolina, in 1863. In this battle, called the First Battle of Charleston Harbor, the Union Navy sent Admiral Du Pont with nine ironclads to attack Charleston. When given the order, the admiral did not expect to be victorious. He would have to steer his ships upriver to the fort and attack it from a standstill, giving the Confederates a valuable edge. The Union Navy was forced to retreat within two hours to prevent too many casualties in a single battle, which would irreparably cripple the navy. Because of this failure, the Union would blockade Charleston for two more years, while the Confederacy was able to set up several more forts along the coast of South Carolina.

=== Cherbourg ===
The Battle of Cherbourg was an intense naval battle that ended in the sinking of CSS Alabama, one of the most powerful ships in the Confederate fleet, by USS Kearsarge. Alabama fired the first shot, but Kearsarge was slightly faster, had more firepower, and carried a larger crew complement than Alabama, giving the Union the advantage. The Confederate ship took many hits and casualties, and the rising water shut off its engines, leaving the surviving crew with no other choice but to surrender and be rescued by Kearsarge.

== Other purposes ==
The navies on both sides not only engaged in battle, but also transported foot soldiers, equipment, and supplies. Without a navy, neither army would have had the supplies or manpower necessary to successfully carry out the war.

Thus, one major strategy of the Union navy involved blockading Southern ports, preventing the South from receiving supplies or aid from allies via shipping ports. Vital supplies such as food, water, ammunition, guns, clothes, and medical supplies never made it to the Confederate troops. The Confederates retained a sufficient amount of resources to withstand the blockade for an extended period of time, causing the war to last longer than expected. However, the blockade continued to prevent the Confederate troops from replenishing their supplies, which in part led to their eventual surrender.

Naval ships on both sides also served as much-needed floating hospitals, housing and treating soldiers who had been injured in battle.

== Battles ==
Battle	Start date	End date	Notes
First Battle of Fort Sumter	April 12, 1861	April 13, 1861	First shots of the naval war fired, first battle of the war
Battle of Gloucester Point	May 7, 1861	May 7, 1861	First naval battle of the war
Battle of Sewell's Point	May 18, 1861	May 19, 1861	
Battle of Aquia Creek	May 29, 1861	June 1, 1861	First use of torpedoes by Confederate forces in combat
Battle of Pig Point	June 5, 1861	June 5, 1861	
Battle of Mathias Point	June 27, 1861	June 27, 1861	
Sinking of the Petrel	July 28, 1861	July 28, 1861	One of the last naval battles in history involving a privateer ship
Battle of Hatteras Inlet Batteries	August 28, 1861	August 29, 1861	The first battle of the war involving both the Union Army and Navy.
Battle of Cockle Creek	October 5, 1861	October 5, 1861	
Battle of the Head of Passes	October 12, 1861	October 12, 1861	First use of ironclad ram in the war
Battle of Port Royal	November 7, 1861	November 7, 1861	First major naval battle of the war
Battle of Cockpit Point	January 3, 1862	January 3, 1862	
Battle of Lucas Bend	January 11, 1862	January 11, 1862	First battle involving Union ironclads in the war
Battle of Fort Henry	February 6, 1862	February 6, 1862	
Battle of Elizabeth City	February 10, 1862	February 10, 1862	
Battle of Hampton Roads	March 8, 1862	March 9, 1862	First naval battle between two ironclad warships
Battle of Forts Jackson and St. Philip	April 16, 1862	April 28, 1862	Led to the Union capture of New Orleans
Battle of Island Number Ten	February 28, 1862	April 8, 1862	First Confederate defeat on the Mississippi River
Battle of Plum Point Bend	May 10, 1862	May 10, 1862	First sinking of Union ironclads by Confederate River Defense Fleet
Battle of Drewry's Bluff	May 15, 1862	May 15, 1862	
First Battle of Memphis	June 6, 1862	June 6, 1862	Confederate River Defense Fleet destroyed by Union rams and ironclad gunboats
Battle of Saint Charles	June 17, 1862	June 17, 1862	
Battle of Tampa	June 30, 1862	July 1, 1862	
Battle of Corpus Christi	August 12, 1862	August 18, 1862	
Battle of Galveston Harbor	October 4, 1862	October 4, 1862	
Battle of Crumpler's Bluff	October 3, 1862	October 3, 1862	
Battle of Fort Hindman	January 9, 1863	January 11, 1863	Led to the largest surrender of Confederate troops west of the Mississippi River prior to the end of the war
Battle off Galveston Lighthouse	January 11, 1863	January 11, 1863	
Battle of Fort McAllister	March 3, 1863	March 3, 1863	
Battle of Fort Pemberton	March 11, 1863	March 11, 1863	
First Battle of Charleston Harbor	April 7, 1863	April 7, 1863	
Battle of Grand Gulf	April 29, 1863	April 29, 1863	
Battle of Wassaw Sound	June 17, 1863	June 17, 1863	
Battle of Portland Harbor	June 27, 1863	June 27, 1863	
First Battle of Fort Wagner	July 10, 1863	July 11, 1863	
Second Battle of Fort Wagner	July 18, 1863	July 18, 1863	
Second Battle of Charleston Harbor	August 17, 1863	September 8, 1863	
Second Battle of Sabine Pass	September 8, 1863	September 8, 1863	Most one-sided Confederate victory of the war
Second Battle of Fort Sumter	September 9, 1863	September 9, 1863	
Attack on USS New Ironsides	October 5, 1863	October 5, 1863	CSS David becomes the first torpedo boat to make a successful attack on an enemy warship in combat
Battle of Fort Brooke	October 16, 1863	October 18, 1863	
Sinking of USS Housatonic	February 17, 1864	February 17, 1864	H. L. Hunley becomes the first submarine to sink an enemy warship in combat
Battle of Fort Pillow	April 12, 1864	April 12, 1864	
Battle of Plymouth	April 17, 1864	April 20, 1864	
Battle of Albemarle Sound	May 5, 1864	May 5, 1864	
Battle of Cherbourg	June 19, 1864	June 19, 1864	Led to the sinking of the Confederate raider CSS Alabama
Battle of Mobile Bay	August 2, 1864	August 23, 1864	Greatest Union naval victory of the war
Bahia Incident	October 7, 1864	October 7, 1864	Led to the capture of the Confederate raider CSS Florida, international incident with Brazil
Capture of Plymouth	October 29, 1864	October 31, 1864	
Jamesville Incident	December 9, 1864	December 9, 1864	
Second Battle of Fort Fisher	January 13, 1865	January 15, 1865	Largest amphibious assault of the war
Battle of Trent's Reach	January 23, 1865	January 25, 1865	Final major naval battle of the war

== See also ==
- Union Navy
- Confederate States Navy
- Bibliography of early American naval history
- History of the United States Navy
- History of the United States Coast Guard
