= Henry Brutsche =

- Civil War era Navy Medal of Honor
- Born: c. 1846; Philadelphia, Pennsylvania
- Died: December 27, 1880 (aged 33–34); Philadelphia, Pennsylvania
- Burial place: Lawnview Memorial Park, Rockledge, Pennsylvania
- Military career
- Allegiance: United States of America; Union
- Branch: United States Navy; Union Navy
- Rank: Landsman
- Unit: USS Tacony (1863)
- Awards: Medal of Honor

Landsman Henry Brutsche (c. 1846 – December 27, 1880) was a Union Navy sailor who fought in the American Civil War. Brutsche received the country's highest award for bravery during combat, the Medal of Honor, for his action aboard the USS Tacony at Plymouth, North Carolina, on 31 October 1864. He was honored with the award on 31 December 1864.

== Biography ==
Brutsche was born in Philadelphia, Pennsylvania, in 1846. He enlisted into the United States Navy. He died on 27 December 1880, and his remains are interred at the Lawnview Memorial Park in Rockledge, Pennsylvania.

== Medal of Honor citation ==
Served on board the U.S.S. Tacony during the taking of Plymouth, N.C., 31 October 1864. Carrying out his duties faithfully during the capture of Plymouth, Brutsche distinguished himself by a display of coolness when he participated in landing and spiking a 9-inch gun while under a devastating fire from enemy musketry.

== See also ==
- List of American Civil War Medal of Honor recipients: A–F
