= Mosquito Creek (South Dakota) =

Stream in South Dakota, U.S.

Coordinates: 42°57′26″N 98°21′04″W

Mosquito Creek is a stream in the U.S. state of South Dakota.

Mosquito Creek derives its name not from the mosquito, but from a Sioux Indian.

== See also ==
- List of rivers of South Dakota
