= Miskito regional rulers =

Official in the Kingdom of Mosquitia

The decentralized Kingdom of Mosquitia (also known as the Mosquito Kingdom), a hereditary indigenous monarchy located along the Caribbean coast of Central America, included several high-ranking hereditary regional rulers appointed or recognized by the Miskito king: Governor, General, and Admiral.

== Historical context ==
The Kingdom of Mosquitia emerged during the early colonial period as a confederated indigenous polity that allied closely with the British from the 17th century onward. As British influence grew, particularly through trade and military support, the Miskito political system began to incorporate European-style titles, such as King, Governor, General, and Admiral—each corresponding to a specific geographic division and set of responsibilities.

== Regional rulers ==
The Governor typically oversaw the region of the kingdom between the Ulang River and the Awaltara River.

The General was commonly in charge of the north-western between the Aguan River and Wanks River. This role emerged more clearly by the early 18th century, during a period of increased British influence and the formalization of Miskito political structures.

The title of Admiral reflected the Miskito’s maritime prowess and their use of river and coastal mobility as strategic assets. The Admiral’s domain was typically situated in the southern quadrant of the kingdom, covering the coastal and inland communities between the Awaltara River to the Bluefields Lagoon. The position’s naval-sounding title reflected both geographic function and military responsibility, particularly regarding control over boat travel, fishing rights, and military operations along the southern coast.

== List of Governors ==
- Piquirin (−1711)
- John Hanibal (1719–1729)
- John Briton (1729–1757)
- William Briton (1757–1775)
- Timothy Briton (c. 1775 – c. 1776
- Colvin Briton (1776–1791)
- Robin Lee (c. 1791 – ?)
- Clement (c. 1791 – 1840)

== List of Generals ==
- Peter (1722–1729)
- Charles Hobby (1729-c. 1740)
- Handyside (c 1740–1764)
- Tempest (1764-c. 1785)
- Thomas Lee (1785–1790)
- Perkin Tempest (1796–1797)
- Edward Trelawney (1790-1790)
- Jaspar Hall (1790–1797)
- Lowry Robinson (1800-?)
- Barras (1820)
- Thomas Lowry Robinson (c. 1830-c. 1847)
- Mettison (1847)

== List of Admirals ==
- Dilly (c. 1740)
- Trelawney "Alparis" Dilson (c 1760-1770)
- "The King's Brother" (c. 1800)
- Earnee (c. 1816)
