= El Mosquito =

Late 19th Century Argentinian satirical journal

- Front page 21 May 1882
- Type: Weekly newspaper
- Founded: 24 May 1863
- Political alignment: Political Satirical paper
- Language: Spanish
- Ceased publication: 16 July 1893
- Headquarters: Buenos Aires, Argentina

El Mosquito was an independent weekly satire newspaper published in Buenos Aires, Argentina. It was the first political humor newspaper in Argentina.

== Overview ==
After the fall of the Juan Manuel de Rosas regime, there was increased press freedom and many newspapers were started. El Mosquito was one of them and it was established in 1863. It was published every Sunday. It did become daily in April 1968 but it did not succeed. The newspaper was known for its cartoons, caricature and political humour. Later on Henri Stein became its owner and chief cartoonist. Then President of Argentina Domingo Faustino Sarmiento had his cartoons drawn by Henri Stein published in El Mosquito.

== Gallery ==
Front page 1876

Front page 1882

Front page 1882

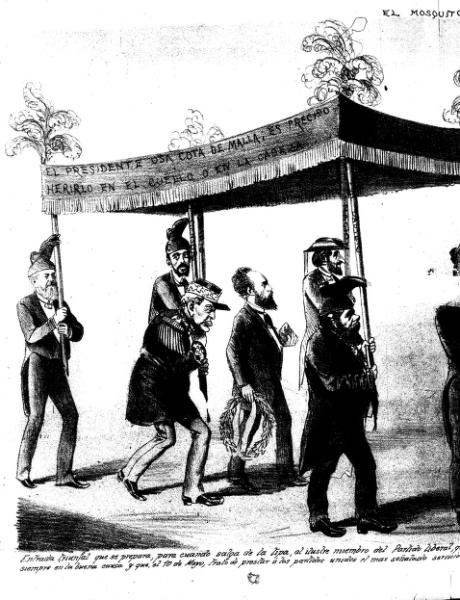
Front page 2 July 1886

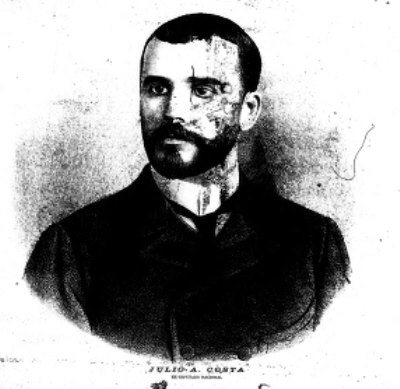
1886

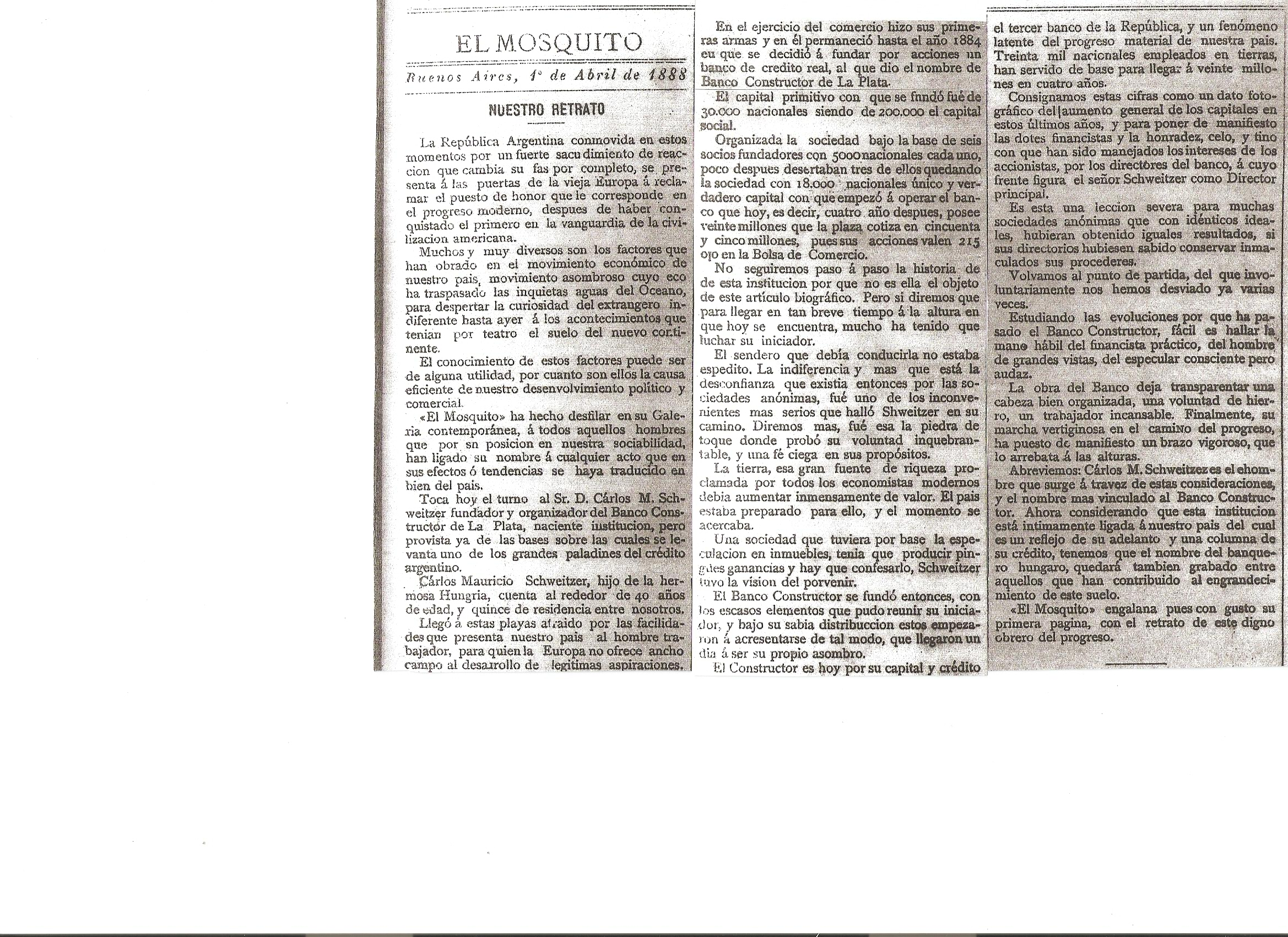
1888

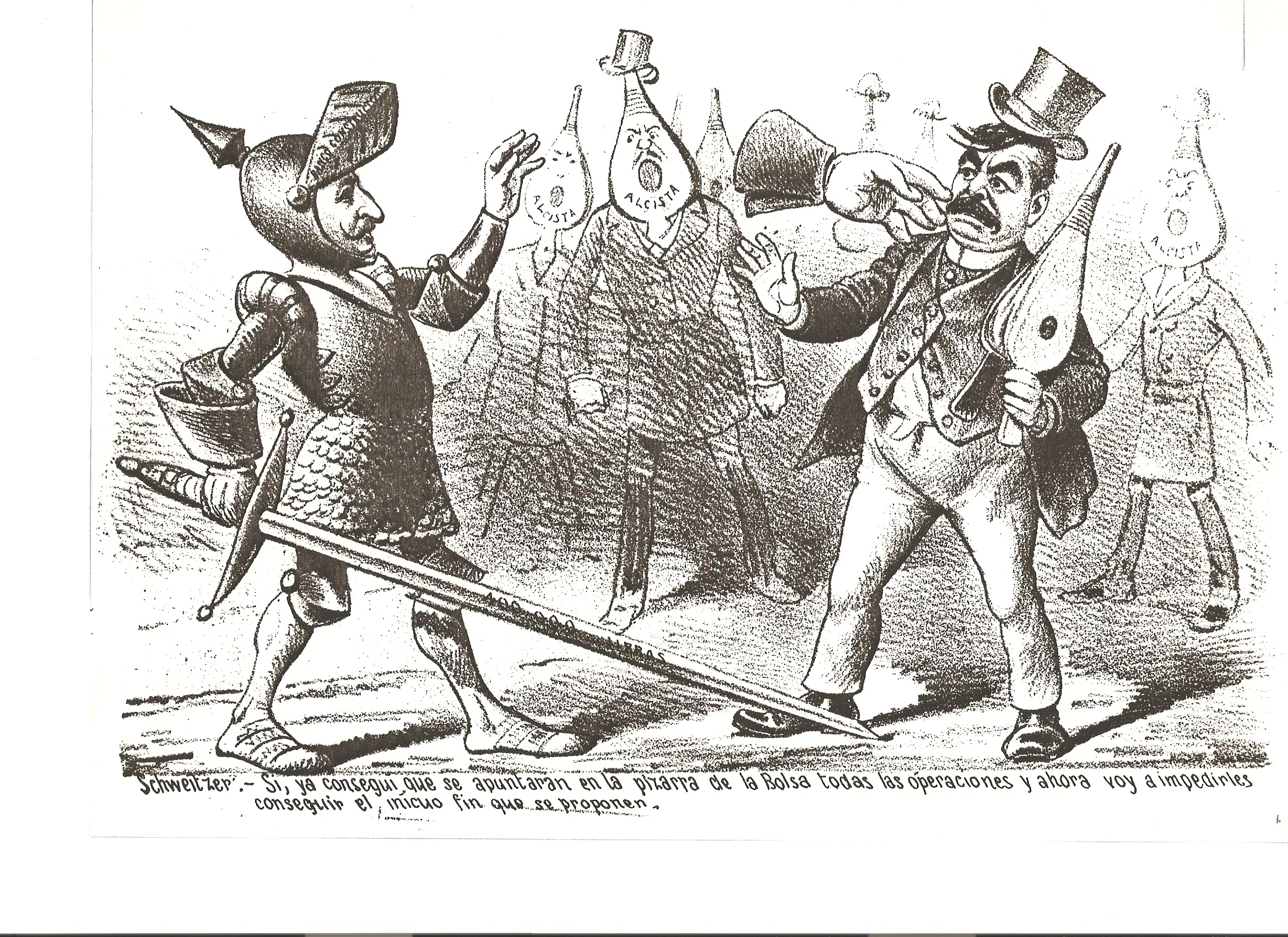
1888

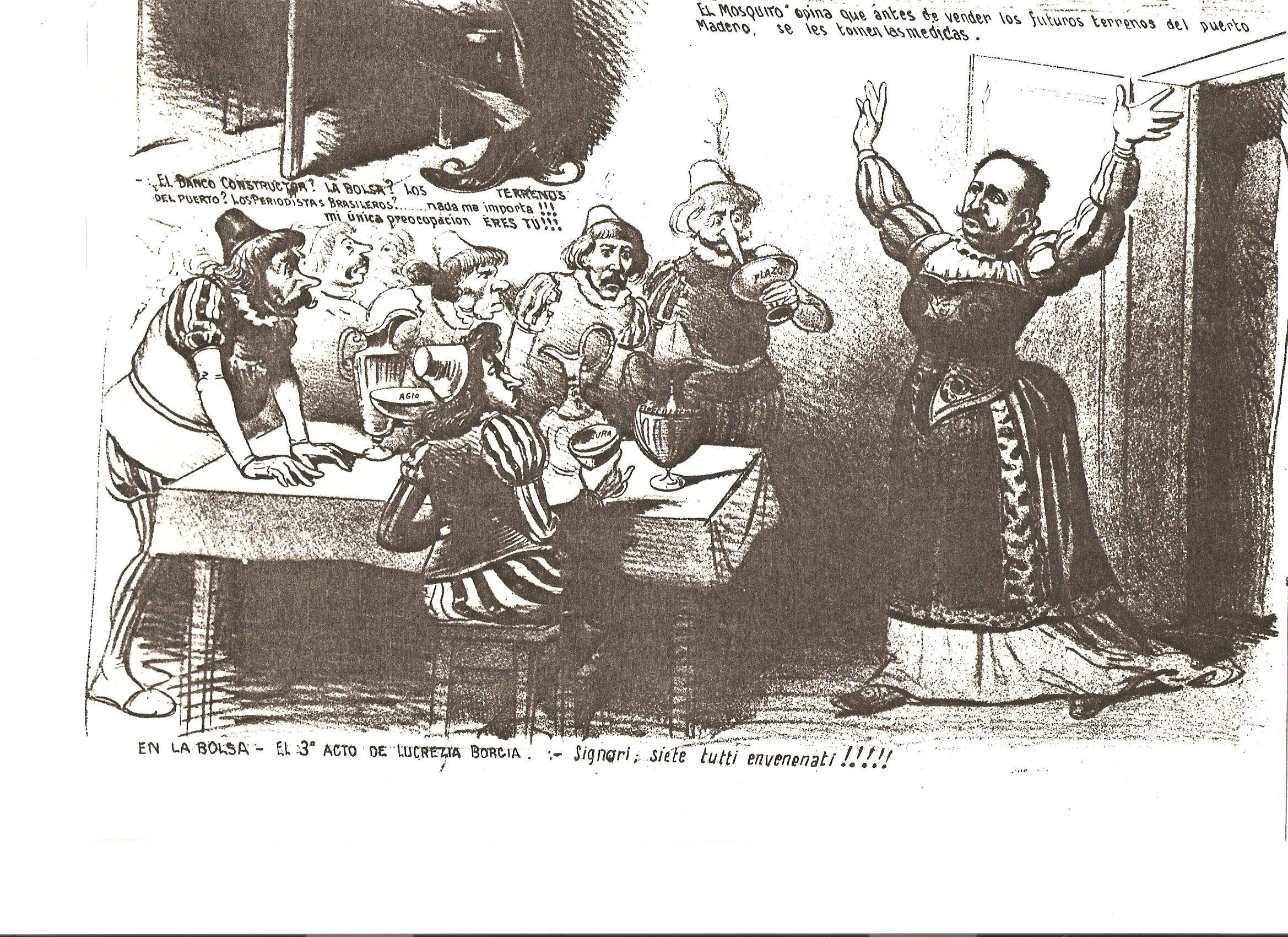
1888

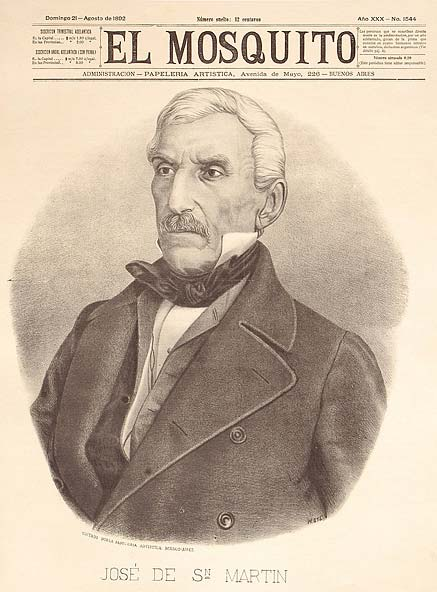
1892
