= Mosquito Creek (Virginia) =

Coordinates: 37.942757°N 75.445861°W

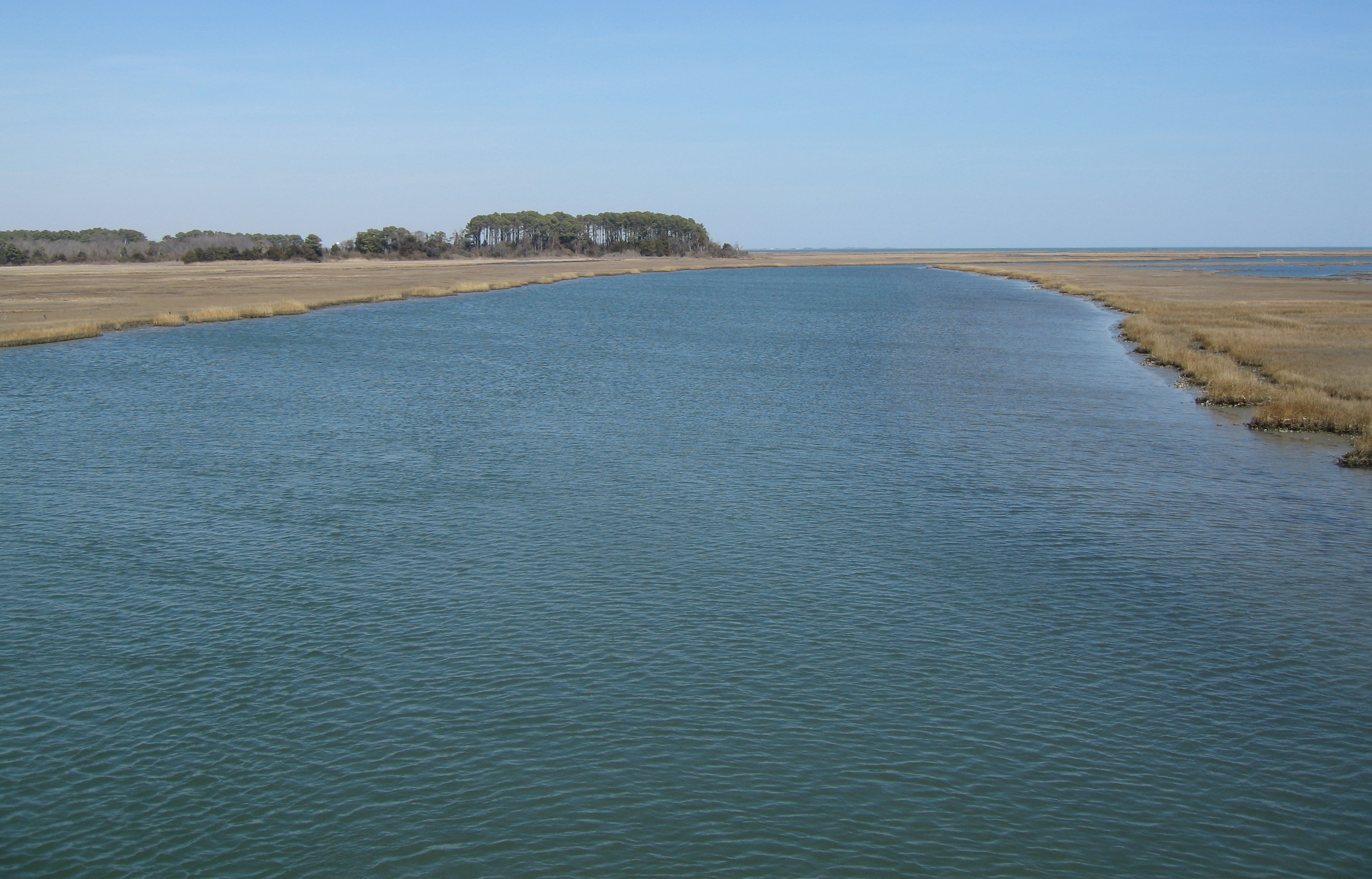
- Mosquito Creek

Location
- Country: United States

Physical characteristics
- Source
  - location: Cockle Creek
- Mouth
  - location: Chincoteague Bay
- Length: 2 mi (3.2 km)

Mosquito Creek is a stream in Chincoteague, Virginia that connects with Cockle Creek to the south and a mouth at Chincoteague Bay to the North.

== History ==
The name of the creek first appeared in the Decisions of the United States Board on Geographical Names in 1943.

== See also ==
- List of Virginia rivers
