= Cockle Creek (Virginia) =

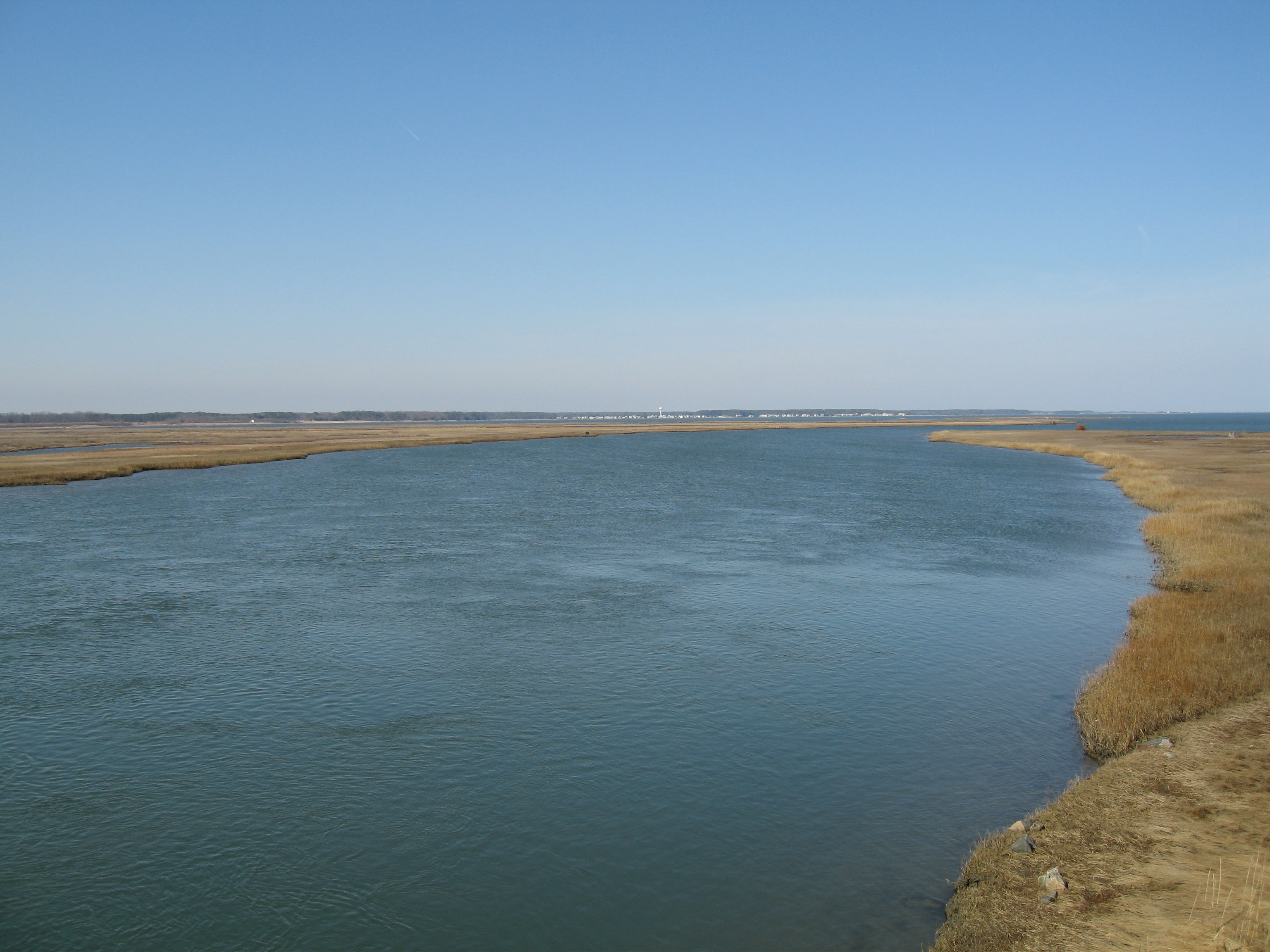

- Location of mouth

Location
- Country: United States

Physical characteristics
- Source
  - location: Chincoteague Inlet
  - elevation: sea level
- Mouth
  - location: Chincoteague Bay
  - coordinates: 37.914898°N 75.444144°W
  - elevation: sea level
- Length: 3.5 miles (5.6 km)

Cockle Creek is a 3.5-mile-long (5.6 km) stream in Chincoteague, Virginia between Chincoteague Inlet to the south and Chincoteague Bay to the north. It was the site of a naval battle during the American Civil War, the Battle of Cockle Creek.

== See also ==
- List of rivers of Virginia
