= Wallops Island =

Island on the U.S. East Coast, within Virginia

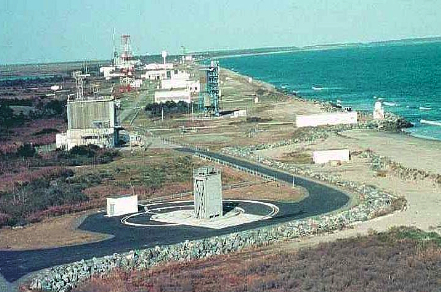

- Location within Virginia Location within the United States

Geography
- Coordinates: 37°51′N 75°28′W
- Area: 6 sq mi (16 km^{2})

Administration
- United States
- State: Virginia
- County: Accomack County

Additional information
- Time zone: Eastern (UTC−05:00)
  - Summer (DST): EDT (UTC−04:00)

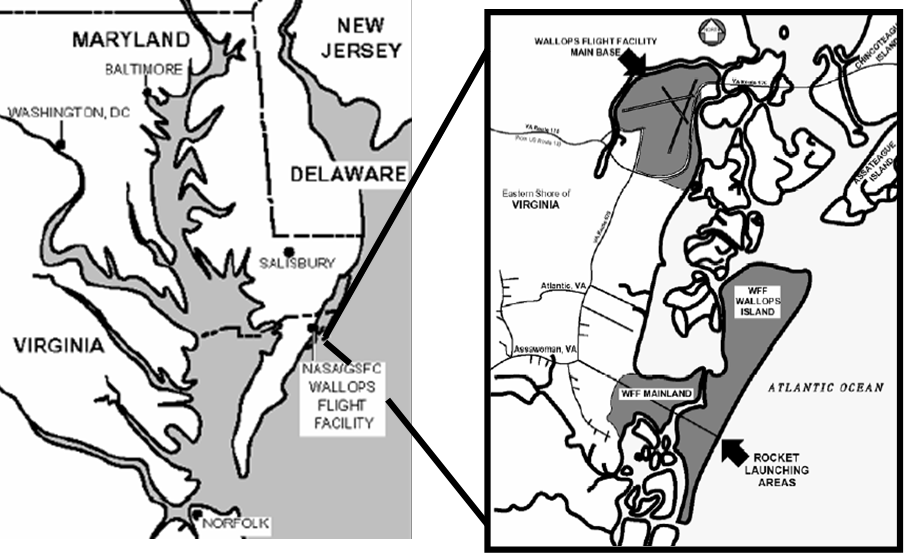
NASA Wallops Flight Facility

Wallops Island is a six-square-mile (16 km^{2}) island in Accomack County, Virginia, part of the Virginia Barrier Islands that stretch along the eastern seaboard of the United States. It is just south of Chincoteague Island, a popular tourist destination.

Wallops Island proper, originally known as Kegotank Island, was granted to John Wallop by the Crown on April 29, 1692. Ownership was divided through the years, until the Commonwealth of Virginia seized the property in 1876 and 1877 in lieu of unpaid taxes. From 1877, ownership was again divided and subdivided until 1889, when it was held by various trustees for the Wallops Island Club. The club was incorporated and assumed ownership in 1933 as the Wallops Island Association, Inc. Association members and their families spent the summers fishing and swimming on the island. The Association grazed sheep, cattle, and ponies on the area until the mid-1940s. In 1947, the U.S. Navy began using the upper two-thirds of the island on a lease-rental basis for aviation ordnance testing. The National Advisory Committee for Aeronautics (NACA), forerunner of NASA, leased the lower 1,000 acres (4.0 km^{2}) for rocket launching facilities.

The island is used primarily for the Wallops Flight Facility, including the Mid-Atlantic Regional Spaceport, although the name also refers to the peninsula area surrounding the island for the purpose of mailing addresses. The Wallops Island National Wildlife Refuge and the Chincoteague Bay Field Station are located on the island.

Some of the World War II film Our Father was filmed on Wallops Island.

== Climate ==
Climate data for Wallops Island, 1991–2020 normals, extremes 1966–present
Month	Jan	Feb	Mar	Apr	May	Jun	Jul	Aug	Sep	Oct	Nov	Dec	Year
Record high °F (°C)	79 (26)	79 (26)	86 (30)	93 (34)	97 (36)	100 (38)	102 (39)	100 (38)	96 (36)	93 (34)	82 (28)	78 (26)	102 (39)
Mean maximum °F (°C)	65.9 (18.8)	67.5 (19.7)	74.7 (23.7)	82.4 (28.0)	88.2 (31.2)	93.1 (33.9)	95.5 (35.3)	93.1 (33.9)	89.5 (31.9)	83.2 (28.4)	73.8 (23.2)	67.7 (19.8)	96.4 (35.8)
Mean daily maximum °F (°C)	46.2 (7.9)	48.5 (9.2)	54.5 (12.5)	64.3 (17.9)	72.7 (22.6)	81.3 (27.4)	86.1 (30.1)	84.2 (29.0)	78.7 (25.9)	69.1 (20.6)	58.8 (14.9)	50.5 (10.3)	66.2 (19.0)
Daily mean °F (°C)	37.9 (3.3)	39.8 (4.3)	45.8 (7.7)	55.1 (12.8)	64.1 (17.8)	73.2 (22.9)	78.2 (25.7)	76.5 (24.7)	70.8 (21.6)	60.2 (15.7)	49.7 (9.8)	42.0 (5.6)	57.8 (14.3)
Mean daily minimum °F (°C)	29.5 (−1.4)	31.1 (−0.5)	37.0 (2.8)	45.9 (7.7)	55.5 (13.1)	65.1 (18.4)	70.4 (21.3)	68.7 (20.4)	63.0 (17.2)	51.4 (10.8)	40.7 (4.8)	33.5 (0.8)	49.3 (9.6)
Mean minimum °F (°C)	12.3 (−10.9)	16.6 (−8.6)	22.4 (−5.3)	32.1 (0.1)	42.4 (5.8)	52.4 (11.3)	60.5 (15.8)	59.2 (15.1)	49.6 (9.8)	36.0 (2.2)	25.9 (−3.4)	19.3 (−7.1)	9.9 (−12.3)
Record low °F (°C)	0 (−18)	−1 (−18)	14 (−10)	26 (−3)	33 (1)	43 (6)	53 (12)	48 (9)	43 (6)	29 (−2)	19 (−7)	4 (−16)	−1 (−18)
Average precipitation inches (mm)	3.15 (80)	2.81 (71)	3.91 (99)	3.12 (79)	3.20 (81)	3.39 (86)	4.37 (111)	4.32 (110)	4.33 (110)	4.02 (102)	2.88 (73)	3.75 (95)	43.25 (1,099)
Average snowfall inches (cm)	3.5 (8.9)	2.3 (5.8)	0.7 (1.8)	0.2 (0.51)	0.0 (0.0)	0.0 (0.0)	0.0 (0.0)	0.0 (0.0)	0.0 (0.0)	0.0 (0.0)	0.0 (0.0)	1.7 (4.3)	8.4 (21)
Average precipitation days (≥ 0.01 in)	10.8	9.4	10.9	10.5	11.0	10.1	10.7	9.0	8.4	8.4	8.7	10.5	118.3
Average snowy days (≥ 0.1 in)	2.0	1.4	0.8	0.1	0.0	0.0	0.0	0.0	0.0	0.0	0.0	0.7	4.9
Source: NOAA

Preceded by Assateague Island	Beaches of Delmarva	Succeeded by Virginia Barrier Islands
