= Pughsville =

Pughsville may refer to:

- Pughsville, Virginia
- Pughsville, Florida, an African American neighborhood that developed adjacent to Winter Haven
