= Jody Jaress =

American actress

- Born: Ottawa, Illinois
- Occupations: Actress, singer, director, writer
- Years active: 1960s–present
- Notable work: Inducted as Jazz & Blues Living Legend 2015 (LA)
- Children: 2

Jody Jaress is an American actress, director, writer and jazz and blues singer in the Los Angeles, California area. She began studying acting, singing, and dancing in the mid 1950s.

== Early life ==
Jaress was born in Ottawa, Illinois, and is the eldest daughter of realtor, John William "Bill" Schafer (1923–2017) from Marion, Illinois and Freda Ellen Jones Schafer (1921–2005), formerly of Johnston City, Illinois, who was a member of the Business and Professional Women's Association in Southern California.

== Early Days In Acting ==
Jaress began her entertainment career at a very young age (1950s) in Michigan and has made appearances on stage, film, television and radio. Early in her acting endeavors, she received acclaim at the Will-O-Way Apprentice Theatre (Michigan) for her Command Performance as Kate in "Taming of the Shrew" requested by Sir Basil Rathbone, (the original Sherlock Holmes (1939-1944). Jaress sang, danced, and recited verse as a guest on local television (After Hours) WXYZ-TV, Bill Kennedy's Showtime, The Auntie Dee Show, CKLW-TV and several radio stations in Detroit and Canada (1955–1960).

Divorce Court (1957) was an early reenactment television series filmed in Michigan, where Jaress played the very young child of an estranged couple. In the early 1960s Jaress joined the American Guild of Variety Artists as a singer/dancer, and by 1970 she had been accepted into the Screen Actors Guild. By 1979 Jaress had many legitimate stage performances in her repertoire like, Peter Pan, Stage Door, Of Mice And Men, then performing as a roller skater, she began her film career in Skatetown, USA, starring Patrick Swayze in his feature film debut. Also in 1979, she had a small role as a dancer in the film Love at First Bite starring George Hamilton. This movie was shot in Los Angeles. Her first adult acting credit was in a feature film (also in 1979) as Rhea, directed and written by Richard Gardner, called The Hunting Season which began as The Bigot and then re-released as a limited edition on DVD/Blu-ray in 1987 by Troma Entertainment and Vinegar Syndrome as Deadly Daphne's Revenge with James Avery from the television series, The Fresh Prince of Bel-air playing a small role as a detective. In the new DVD/Blu-ray release, there is an additional perk called Answering the Call where Jaress gives an interview about director/writer Gardner and the filming of The Hunting Season. Crisis Counselor (1982) was a reality based reenactment television series, which starred Jaress as Julie in the episode: Breast Cancer. Gaining career momentum, Jaress appeared as Jane in director/writer Joseph Merhi's feature film, Fresh Kill with Robert Z'Dar. Jaress did some work as a stand-in for Karen Black in the remake of Invaders from Mars (1986), and the same stand-in work for all the lead actresses who guest starred on Michael Nesmith's late night music video television series titled "Television Parts" CBS.

== Acting Through Millennium ==
Starting in 2001, Independent short films became popular as well as Ms Jaress who starred in many over several years. In 2005, she appeared in the David Gaz directed feature film Diamond Zero that starred Tippi Hedren and Bronson Pinchot . In 2008 she garnered top five credit listing, playing Rhea in the award-winning feature film, Chain Link, directed and written by Dylan Reynolds. Also that same year she co-starred as Ruby in the TV series, Terminator: The Sarah Connor Chronicles in Self Made Man Season II, episode 11.

In 2014, she was given top five billing as Agnes in the Stanley Yung directed horror film, 2 Bedroom 1 Bath that starred Andrew W. Walker, Michele Hicks, Eric Roberts and Dee Wallace. Also in the same year, she appeared in the Diane Cornell directed short See Me which also starred Tina Cole.

In 2015 she starred in the Dawn Fields directed Fragile Storm, an award-winning short film that also starred Lance Henriksen and Mackenzie Mason. A short film titled, Duke (2016) Jaress stars alongside of actress, Spice Williams-Crosby, directed by Anthony De Longis (actor, stunt master, director/writer) and co-written and produced by Gregory Crosby producer, Hacksaw Ridge directed by Mel Gibson 2016.

== Other Work In Film ==
She directed and wrote the psychological screenplay, Traces of Memory, a short film, and Sara Ballantine, were the lead actors, with Daniela Torchia in a featured role with Jody appearing in a cameo. It was produced by Hal Alpert, Rick Honstrater and co-produced by Robert Amico It was Jaress's directorial film debut garnering her honors as a new director.

== Music ==
Jaress is a singer in the blues and jazz genres. She has opened for artists that include Louis Armstrong, Harry Belafonte, Dinah Shore, and Janet Blair. She has also shared dual billing with multi-Grammy winner, Bili Redd Thedford.

For her years of performing and contribution to the jazz and blues community, on April 30, 2015, Jaress was named as a "Jazz and Blues Living Legend" and Inducted into the foundation by the Duke Ellington Society of L.A., the Living Legend Foundation, JaZzabration, NAACP Beverly Hills and Hollywood, and by the City of Los Angeles as an official event to celebrate "International Jazz Day" created by the United Nations Educational, Scientific and Cultural Organization UNESCO), and held annually since 2011, around the globe in more than 196 countries to date. For four years she performed a monthly gig with her friend and smooth jazz/pop singer, Linda A. as "Just Us... Jody & Linda" and musical friends.

== Personal life ==
Jaress has two children, a son, JC Jaress (married to Anastasia King Jaress), and a daughter, Michele Lea Jaress (1967-1998). She divorced Michael F. Jaress, the father of her two children, in 1975.

== Discography ==
- Whisper Low (2015)
- Hearts On Fire (2007)
