= Professional Building (Suffolk, Virginia) =

Historic commercial building in Virginia, United States

- U.S. National Register of Historic Places
- U.S. Historic district – Contributing property
- Virginia Landmarks Register
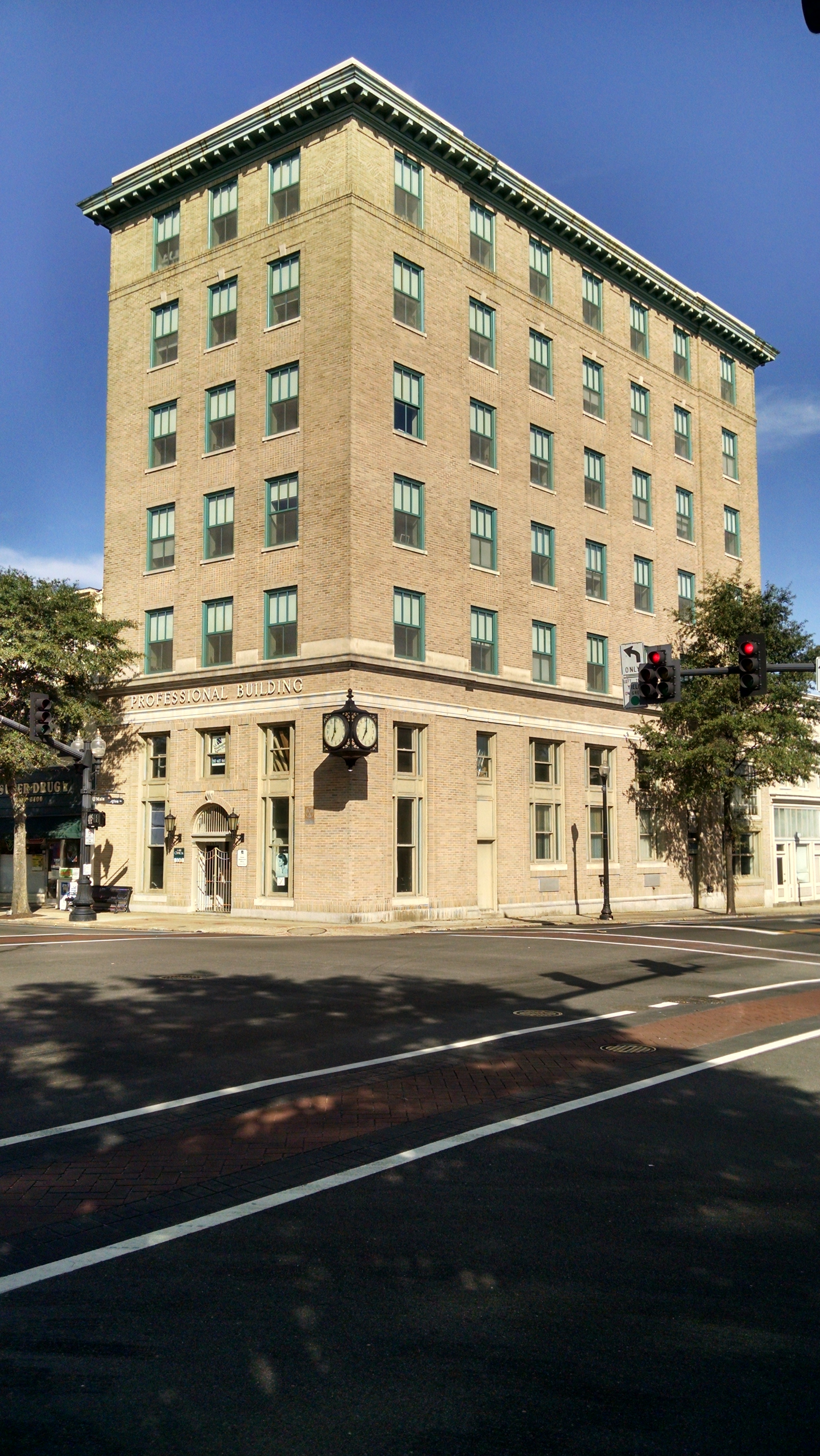

- Location within Virginia Location within the United States
- Location: 100 N. Main St., Suffolk, Virginia
- Coordinates: 36°43′41″N 76°35′0″W
- Area: less than one acre
- Built: 1916
- Architect: Peebles, John Kevan; Harwood & Moss
- Architectural style: Colonial Revival, Skyscraper
- NRHP reference No.: 99001005
- VLR No.: 133-5032

Significant dates
- Added to NRHP: August 12, 1999
- Designated VLR: June 16, 1999

Professional Building, also known as the American Bank and Trust Company building, is a historic commercial building located at Suffolk, Virginia. It was built between 1916 and 1919, and is a seven-story, steel frame building with Pyrobar fireproofing. The building measures 35.2 feet wide by 81 feet deep. It is 80 feet tall and has Colonial Revival style architectural details.

It was added to the National Register of Historic Places in 1999. It is located in the Suffolk Historic District.
