= Ribbons of shame =

Ribbons of shame is a Japanese management training practice of giving ribbons with criticisms to those employees who fail to meet the expectations of the management.

Ribbons of shame are a prominent feature of the Kanrisha Yosei Gakko (KYG), a management training "hell camp" that became well-known in the 1970s and 1980s. Trainees were issued with 13 or 14 ribbons upon arriving at the camp, each corresponding to a task or a shortcoming that the trainee had to overcome before graduating. In the late 1980s, KYG opened a branch in Malibu, California, where the ribbons of shame were renamed "ribbons of challenge." The ribbons remained in use at KYG as of 2024.

The concept was popularized in the United States by the 1986 movie Gung Ho, starring Michael Keaton.
