= Rambo: The Force of Freedom =

1986 American animated series

- Promotional release poster
- Genre: Action-adventure
- Based on: First Blood by David Morrell
- Written by: Michael Chain
- Directed by: John Kimball; Charles A. Nichols
- Voices of: Neil Ross; Alan Oppenheimer; Michael Ansara; Lennie Weinrib; Peter Cullen; Mona Marshall; James Avery; Frank Welker; Edmund Gilbert; Robert Ito
- Opening theme: Jerry Goldsmith
- Ending theme: Jerry Goldsmith
- Composers: Haim Saban; Shuki Levy
- Country of origin: United States
- Original language: English
- No. of seasons: 1
- No. of episodes: 65

Production
- Executive producers: Joe Ruby; Ken Spears
- Producers: Walt Kubiak; Cos Anzilotti
- Running time: 25 minutes
- Production companies: Ruby-Spears Enterprises; Carolco Pictures

Original release
- Network: First-run syndication
- Release: September 15 – December 26, 1986

Rambo: The Force of Freedom (also known simply as Rambo) is a 1986 American animated series based on the character of John Rambo from David Morrell's book First Blood and the subsequent films First Blood (1982) and Rambo: First Blood Part II (1985). Though both the book and films were targeted strictly towards adults and featured extreme violence, Rambo: The Force of Freedom was targeted towards children. It was the first animated series to be adapted from an R-rated film series. This series was adapted for television by story editor/head writer Michael Chain and also spawned a toy line.

The series ran for 65 episodes and was produced by Ruby-Spears Enterprises. It debuted on April 14, 1986, as a five-part miniseries and was renewed in September as a daily cartoon. The series is set in a separate universe which ignores the events of Rambo III (1988).

== Plot ==
On Colonel Trautman's request, John Rambo leads a special unit called "The Force of Freedom" all over the globe with their goal being protecting the world against the paramilitary terrorist organization S.A.V.A.G.E. (Specialist-Administrators of Vengeance, Anarchy and Global Extortion) led by the nefarious General Warhawk.

== Characters ==
=== The Force of Freedom ===
The Force of Freedom is a team commanded by Colonel Trautman and led by Rambo that goes around the world fighting the forces of S.A.V.A.G.E. Among the core members of the Force of Freedom are:

- John Rambo - The protagonist of the series. He leads the Force of Freedom in fighting S.A.V.A.G.E. when called in by Colonel Samuel Trautman. When not on missions, Rambo enjoys tending to animals and helping kids with their survival training.
- Colonel Samuel "Sam" Trautman - He serves as the group's commanding officer. He often calls in Rambo during his break time. Colonel Trautman sometimes accompanies Rambo on his missions.
- Edward "Turbo" Hayes - An African-American mechanical engineer and race car driver. According to his toy bio, Turbo is also a First Lieutenant who graduated from the US Air Force Academy.
- Katherine Anne "K.A.T." Taylor - An Asian-American military woman who is a master of disguises, gymnastics, and martial arts. K.A.T. seems to have a crush on Rambo. K.A.T.'s toy bio says she grew up as an army brat who hit her first bullseye at 100 yards when she was 10 years old.
- White Dragon - A heroic ninja who is Black Dragon's twin brother. According to his toy bio, White Dragon was raised by mystical mountain warriors and had also developed a ninja training program for the U.S. military forces.
- T.D. "Touchdown" Jackson - A former football player and ally of Rambo. He joined the Force of Freedom at the time when Mad Dog's gang forces elderly couples out of their homes as part of General Warhawk's plot to dig into a military base and steal a top secret new supertank in "Blockbuster". T.D.'s toy bio also revealed that he is an expert discus thrower and wielded an M77 Disc Launcher that Turbo created for him.
- Chief - A Native American ally of Rambo. He joined the Force of Freedom after he rescued his friends in the swamp and from S.A.V.A.G.E. following the plane crash. He helps prevent General Warhawk from burying the gold in the sacred grounds on Spirit Island (where the graves of Chief's forefathers are located) in "Skyjacked Gold". Chief's toy bio states that he is an expert at commando tactics who is strong as a grizzly bear enough to wrestle a mountain lion with is bare hands, silent as an eagle, clever as a fox, and fast as a mountain wind.

=== S.A.V.A.G.E. ===
S.A.V.A.G.E. (short for Specialist-Administrators of Vengeance, Anarchy and Global Extortion) are the main antagonists of the show consisting of international criminals and outcasts. Their goal of world domination leads them into conflict with the Force of Freedom, especially Rambo. In addition to a substantial number of soldiers and other like-minded allies, among the core members of S.A.V.A.G.E. are:

- General Warhawk - The leader of S.A.V.A.G.E. Wearing reflective sunglasses, he serves as the primary villain. General Warhawk was previously a European army captain (possibly West Germany) who was convicted of selling state secrets and exiled for his coup. He then organized and built S.A.V.A.G.E.
- Sergeant Havoc - General Warhawk's second-in-command and top enforcer. He has strength that rivals Rambo's strength. Sergeant Havoc's toy bio states that he was previously a drill sergeant for the free world. After being court-martialed for espionage, he joined up with S.A.V.A.G.E.
- Gripper - A European mercenary and member of S.A.V.A.G.E with a metal right hand (hence the name) that wears an eyepatch. His toy bio mentions that Gripper was a former member of the French Foreign Legion until he was dismissed after failing to recognize the surrender flag and joined S.A.V.A.G.E.
- Nomad - A burnoose-wearing Middle-Eastern member of S.A.V.A.G.E. He was a wandering nomadic warrior that calls no country his home. Nomad leads a group of outcasts which consists of cutthroats and thieves that are familiar with the deserts. Like Mad Dog in one episode "The Taking of Tierra Libre", he was called "Omar" by Rambo. In all subsequent episodes, he was renamed Nomad.
- S.A.V.A.G.E. Street Bikers - A biker gang that is loyal to S.A.V.A.G.E. They get their name from their leader's toy bio.
  - Mad Dog - The leader of the S.A.V.A.G.E Street Bikers who sports a mohawk and a S.A.V.A.G.E. logo tattoo on his chest. He is first called "Spike" in the episode "Battlefield Bronx," but renamed Mad Dog in all subsequent episodes. According to his toy bio, Mad Dog was found unfit for military services and has an extended criminal record for theft, reckless driving, and arson.
  - Animal - A member of the S.A.V.A.G.E. Street Bikers who sports a white mohawk.
  - Jerkface - A crafty member of the S.A.V.A.G.E. Street Bikers who sports a black mohawk and a blue paint over his right eye.
  - Razor - An overconfident member of the S.A.V.A.G.E. Street Bikers who sports spiky brown hair.
- Black Dragon - A rogue ninja who is the twin brother of White Dragon. He was raised by mystical mountain warriors and is known as the greatest assassin that ever lived. Black Dragon would sell his service to any group that would pay his fee with his recurring clients being S.A.V.A.G.E. He sometimes has other ninjas under his command when assisting S.A.V.A.G.E. in some of their plots. Although Black Dragon's ultimate goal is to kill White Dragon, he also considers Rambo as a worthy opponent.
- Snakebite - A member of S.A.V.A.G.E. who was raised in the Okeefenokee Swamp and likes wild animals like venomous snakes, insects, and black rats which he carries in his Beast Pack.
- Dr. Hyde - A cybernetic mad scientist, thief, spy, and member of S.A.V.A.G.E. whose head is in a dome-shaped helmet. According to General Warhawk in the episode "Robot Raid", he and X-Ray were thought to be long dead, but became mad geniuses.
  - X-Ray - Dr. Hyde's cybernetic henchman. Along with Dr. Hyde, he was also thought to be long dead and became a mad genius in his own right.
  - Max - Dr. Hyde's android henchman and enforcer who was created by Dr. Hyde and X-Ray.

Two villains were members of S.A.V.A.G.E. and appeared twice:

- Admiral Nomak - An admiral who assists General Warhawk. First, he helps General Warhawk in "Raise the Yamato" in a plot to raise the Yamato Battleship in order to take over Tierra Libre. He then appears in "Pirate Peril" along with Captain Scar, assisting General Warhawk in a plot to raise the French submarine Liberte off the coast of Hong Kong. Afterwards, both he and Captain Scar are captured by Rambo, yet the former was later arrested for conspiring with S.A.V.A.G.E. and for treason.
- Count - A descendant of Vlad III the Impaler who works with General Warhawk. He captures Nobel Prize–winning physicist Herbert Kengsington in "Deadly Keep". He helps General Warhawk in a plot to capture the President of the United States in "Return of the Count". He is locked up in a closet and captured by Rambo.

Other members of S.A.V.A.G.E. only appeared once. Among them were Rama, the leader of the Cult of the Cobra, and Mike Flynn, an old fried of Rambo.

== Episodes ==
=== Miniseries ===
No.	Title	Written by	Original release date
1	"First Strike"	Mike Chain	April 14, 1986
S.A.V.A.G.E. arrives in the country of Tierra Libre in a plot to conquer it. It is up to Rambo to stop S.A.V.A.G.E. from rolling his forces from the bridge at the river of "Rio Hondo".
2	"The Angel of Destruction"	Barbara Chain	April 15, 1986
A warplane called the Spectre gets stolen by S.A.V.A.G.E. in their plot to take over Tierra Libre. It is up to Rambo to stop S.A.V.A.G.E. and reclaim the Spectre from General Warhawk's Headquarters at the "Rainbow Peak" mountains.
3	"Battlefield Bronx"	Rowby Goren	April 16, 1986
General Warhawk sends Mad Dog (once called "Spike") to capture President Ramon's daughter Estrella during his visit to the United Nations and convince him to surrender Tierra Libre to him. It is up to Rambo to rescue the President's daughter from Mad Dog's outpost in the Bronx.
4	"Raise the Yamato"	Jack Bornoff	April 17, 1986
General Warhawk and his ally Admiral Nomak raise the battleship Yamato in his latest plot to take over Tierra Libre. It is up to Rambo to stop S.A.V.A.G.E. from sailing it to the Tierra Libre Harbor.
5	"The Taking of Tierra Libre"	Jack Bornoff	April 18, 1986
S.A.V.A.G.E. plots to dispose of Rambo and Colonel Trautman so that they would be out of the way for them to take over Tierra Libre. It is up to Rambo and the Force of Freedom to liberate Tierra Libre from S.A.V.A.G.E.'s hostile takeover.

=== Regular series ===
No.	Title	Written by	Original release date
6	"Subterranean Holdup"	Jack Bornoff	September 15, 1986
General Warhawk's latest plan is to steal the solid gold plates from Chicago's Federal Reserve Bank to print out U.S. currency so he could print his own money. It is up to Rambo to prevent S.A.V.A.G.E. from stealing the solid gold plates.
7	"Trouble in Tibet"	Steve Hayes	September 16, 1986
General Warhawk and Sergeant Havoc capture a young monk who would become the next Dalai Lama and gains control of a small village in Tibet.
8	"S.A.V.A.G.E. Island"	Rowby Goren	September 17, 1986
Gripper steals the Pandora Missile that was meant for the Carlaya Islands in order for S.A.V.A.G.E. to force Carlaya's Indonesian neighbors to surrender.
9	"General Warhawk's Curse"	Sheryl Scarborough	September 18, 1986
Under the orders of General Warhawk, Sergeant Havoc, Gripper, Nomad and an ally named Bashir take advantage of three countries by passing off fake curses in S.A.V.A.G.E.'s plot to steal the artifacts in the ruins.
10	"Deadly Keep"	Matt Uitz	September 19, 1986
Nobel Prize–winning physicist Dr. Herbert Kensington is kidnapped by the Count (a descendant of Vlad III the Impaler) and plans to hand him over to S.A.V.A.G.E. in the Moldavian Mountains. General Warhawk plans to use Herbert in a plot to use neutron fusion energy for world domination.
11	"Beneath the Streets"	Bob Forward	September 22, 1986
Mad Dog enters the sewers beneath the Special Forces building and places a bomb there while encountering Rambo's war buddy nicknamed "Wrongway." Upon rescuing Wrongway, Rambo ends up stumbling upon Mad Dog and General Warhawk's plot to plant a bomb underneath the White House unaware that the bomb that Mad Dog had already planted was underneath the Special Forces building as well.
12	"Cult of the Cobra"	Matt Uitz	September 23, 1986
General Warhawk teams up with the Cult of the Cobra and its leader Rama to halt the food shipments to the Indian province of Assam in a plot to force the people of Assam to make him their dictator.
13	"Raid on Las Vegas"	Matt Uitz	September 24, 1986
General Warhawk plans to blow up Boulder Dam as a diversion so that he can rob the casino money in Las Vegas, Nevada. It is up to Rambo and the Force of Freedom to stop General Warhawk, Nomad, Mad Dog, Black Dragon, and a female panther trainer operative named Pandora from robbing the casinos.
14	"The Lost City of Acra"	Barbara Chain	September 25, 1986
General Warhawk locates the lost city of Acra in India and leads his soldiers into rounding up the Bindus in a plot to force them to dig up its treasures.
15	"Guns Over the Suez"	Jack Bornoff	September 26, 1986
General Warhawk sets his sights on the Suez Canal and threatens to blow up all shipping on the Suez Canal unless his is paid $1,000,000. Now Rambo must locate the special gun that will help General Warhawk blow up all the shipping on the Suez Canal and defeat General Warhawk and his ally Sheik Hassat.
16	"Exercise in Terror"	Barbara Chain	October 6, 1986
S.A.V.A.G.E. does three terrorist attacks in order to gain money for General Warhawk to start an international terrorist training camp. First, General Warhawk has Sergeant Havoc, Nomad, Gripper, and Mad Dog hold a teacher and her students for ransom in the Statue of Liberty, threaten to blow up the Eiffel Tower, and finally plans to set up his headquarters in Bagdinia.
17	"The Doomsday Machine"	Steve Hayes	October 7, 1986
Rambo's old friend Mike Flynn steals the XK-7 fighter jet and uses it to help General Warhawk in enslaving the Zimboli to mine diamonds for him.
18	"Disaster in Delgado"	Rowby Goren	October 8, 1986
S.A.V.A.G.E. has been intercepting transports for relief supplies bound for the country of Delgado which has been torn apart by natural disasters. It is up to Rambo and the Force of Freedom to get the supplies to Delgado and drive S.A.V.A.G.E. away.
19	"Fire in the Sky"	Chris A. Weber and Karen E. Wilson	October 9, 1986
Under orders of General Warhawk, Sergeant Havoc, Gripper, Nomad, and a female operative named Varinia steal a submarine called the USS Typhoon and plan to auction it to any terrorist that is interested in it.
20	"Enter the Black Dragon"	Jack Bornoff	October 10, 1986
When S.A.V.A.G.E. attacks a foreign base only to end up being thwarted by Rambo and the Force of Freedom, General Warhawk calls in a ninja assassin called Black Dragon to take Rambo down.
21	"Reign of the Boy King"	Barbara Chain	October 13, 1986
The boy king Alexander of Morovia has been kidnapped by Sergeant Havoc and Gripper allowing Alexander's uncle Black Duke Lucan to succeed him allowing S.A.V.A.G.E. to build a base in Morovia. It is up to Rambo to rescue King Alexander and overthrow Black Duke Lucan.
22	"Rambo and the White Rhino"	Steve Hayes	October 14, 1986
S.A.V.A.G.E. steals a sacred white rhinoceros named Mabuto from the African country of Namboola in order to set up its neighboring country of Ombasi for stealing their white rhinoceros. General Warhawk uses the approaching war as a diversion to mine platinum in Namboola's sacred burial grounds.
23	"Pirate Peril"	Steve Hayes	October 15, 1986
General Warhawk and Admiral Nomak team up with Captain Scar and his pirates in a plot to raise the sunken Liberte submarine off the coast of Hong Kong. Note: This was the second appearance of Admiral Nomak since the Tierra Libre episode "Raise the Yamato".
24	"Mephisto's Magic"	Rowby Goren	October 16, 1986
When Rambo and the Force of Freedom stop General Warhawk's plot to steal the Liberty Bell, General Stedring insists to Colonel Trautman that his own army rather than the Force of Freedom be used next time in an attempt to discredit Rambo and disband the team as well. This problem comes into conflict when General Warhawk and his magician ally Mephisto successfully steal the Washington Monument. Note: This was the first out of three attempts by General Stedring to discredit Rambo and disband the Force of Freedom.
25	"The Halley Microbe"	Jack Bornoff	October 17, 1986
Kat's scientific brother, David is investigating the ion trail left by Halley's Comet and a space probe sent to gather samples left by the comet is targeted by S.A.V.A.G.E. who plan to use the alien microbe samples which turns anyone exposed to them into raving lunatics.
26	"Death Merchant"	Matt Uitz	October 20, 1986
When Rambo's team captures the Death Merchant from his own fortified mansion, the train they are carrying him on is intercepted by S.A.V.A.G.E. who plan to use Death Merchant's services in a plot to rob the treasures of King Tut, even supplying S.A.V.A.G.E. with new weapons to combat the Force of Freedom, especially Rambo.
27	"Return of the Count"	Matt Uitz	October 21, 1986
On Halloween, the Count resurfaces and captures a boy named Danny. Even when Rambo escapes his trap and rescues Danny, he discovers that the Count is collaborating with General Warhawk to capture the President of the United States.
28	"Night of the Voodoo Moon"	Dan DiStefano	October 22, 1986
Rambo, Kat, and Turbo investigate Haiti when a scientist named Dr. Stark goes missing. They discover that General Warhawk has allied with a Haitian Voodoo magician named Mombo Igthayan in a plot to enslave the islanders and mine the island.
29	"Lagoon of Death"	Dan DiStefano	October 23, 1986
While vacationing in Venice, Rambo and the Force of Freedom discover that General Warhawk, Sergeant Havoc, Gripper, and Mad Dog are forcing the monks at a monastery to use their special ceramic to make nosecones for S.A.V.A.G.E.'s missiles.
30	"Snow Kill"	Dan DiStefano	October 24, 1986
While out testing the survival equipment in Utah, Colonel Trautman ends up stumbling upon Gripper attacking a nearby town and ends up captured as well. General Warhawk uses the Earth-Eater machine to go through a gold mine and take over the Warton Missile Complex and threatens to launch an attack from the missile base to all of North America if his demands aren't met.
31	"Terror Beneath the Sea"	Steve Hayes	October 27, 1986
While out inspecting a base in the Arctic Circle, Colonel Trautman is told by the Eskimo's Chief Molok that a Killer whale named Korac keeps attacking their village. Colonel Trautman and a security captain are then captured by Gripper. When Rambo and the Force of Freedom come to the rescue, they discover that General Warhawk and his ally Dr. Blackburn are using a mind-control electro box on Korac in a plot to attack the NORAD Bases.
32	"Swamp Monster"	Jack Bornoff	October 28, 1986
Rambo and Turbo come to the aid of Turbo's uncle, Oliver when a swamp monster terrorizes the local town. Rambo discovers that the so-called "swamp monster" is a disguised vehicle piloted by Sergeant Havoc as part of General Warhawk's plot to build a communication center that will enable S.A.V.A.G.E. to control the defense satellites.
33	"Freedom Dancer"	Barbara Chain	October 29, 1986
While in England, General Warhawk sends S.A.V.A.G.E. to steal the world's fastest race horse named Freedom Dancer who is owned by Colonel Trautman's friend Winslow and his daughter Sara. While on a mission to rescue Freedom Dancer, Rambo discovers that General Warhawk has done it on behalf of an Arab horse owner named Al Rasheed in order to remove it from the competition in return for General Warhawk's fighter jets.
34	"Texas Inferno"	Rowby Goren	October 30, 1986
Rambo's old friend Lucky calls upon Rambo when his oil drilling platform keeps exploding. What Rambo is unaware of, was that Lucky's partner Jake is in league with Nomad in a S.A.V.A.G.E. plot to work on a warhead that will help them in world domination.
35	"The Iron Mask"	Matt Uitz	October 31, 1986
While attending Oktoberfest in Munich, Rambo's team discover a scheme by General Warhawk and his ally Iron Mask to steal a recently located old warplane containing a fortune of gold. During the stay, Rambo encounters a boy named Hors who got amnesia when he learns of S.A.V.A.G.E.'s plot and Iron Mask's true identity.
36	"Children for Peace"	Matt Uitz	November 3, 1986
The Force of Freedom (including Rambo, Colonel Trautman, Kat, White Dragon, and Turbo) is providing security for the Children's Peace Conference in Sydney. General Warhawk sends S.A.V.A.G.E. in a plan to capture the children.
37	"S.A.V.A.G.E. Rustlers"	Rowby Goren	November 4, 1986
Rambo's team helps a rancher named Shane Dobbs whose cattle have been stolen by Mad Dog. They soon discover that S.A.V.A.G.E. is in an alliance with an outlaw scientist named Dr. Gore to slip a belligerence formula into the beef which will cause all humans and animals to act very mean including the US Army soldiers which will cause a lot of chaos.
38	"Mind Control"	Matt Uitz	November 5, 1986
S.A.V.A.G.E.'s scientist Professor Larson brainwashes three brilliant scientists, Dr. Paulsen, Dr. James, and Kat's college friend Lisa, using a mind-controlled remote device in order to obtain the plans for a special laser that will help General Warhawk shoot down a passing satellite.
39	"Vote of Terror"	Rowby Goren	November 6, 1986
Kai Moon's President Wang is forced by S.A.V.A.G.E. to read a letter of resignation days before his reelection. The Force of Freedom ends up coming to the country's aid when S.A.V.A.G.E. does various attacks to discourage President Wang and get General Warhawk's friend Mr. Leong elected.
40	"Target, Supertanker"	Steve Hayes	November 7, 1986
S.A.V.A.G.E. hijacks a supertanker and anchor it off the coast of Hawaii. General Warhawk plans to scuttle the tanker causing an ecological disaster if his demands for a warship aren't met.
41	"Enter the White Dragon"	Jack Bornoff	November 10, 1986
In this episode, it shows how Rambo met White Dragon at the time when General Warhawk has Black Dragon (White Dragon's twin brother) steal priceless samurai swords from Ishikawa Electronic Co. in return for sending the prototype Robots to be armed with weapons for takeover.
42	"Skyjacked Gold"	Steve Hayes	November 11, 1986
When his team ends up captured by S.A.V.A.G.E. when they end up skyjacking a shipment of government gold heading to the Denver Mint following a plane crash in the swamp, Rambo befriends a helpful Indian named Chief who helps rescue his friends. Once that is done, the group must now prevent General Warhawk from burying the gold in the sacred grounds on Spirit Island (where the graves of Chief's forefathers are located).
43	"Attack on El Dorado"	Steve Hayes	November 12, 1986
S.A.V.A.G.E. invades El Dorado near Tartatinga and plots to take it over which includes stealing all of the Inca's gold. It is up to Rambo and the Force of Freedom to liberate El Dorado and drive off S.A.V.A.G.E.
44	"The Ninja Dog"	Jack Bornoff	November 13, 1986
While Rambo's team provides security for Senator Thorne during his trip to Japan to meet with President Fujita, a prototype chip for an American defense project is stolen by the science team leader Dr. Hiro Gosho who places the chip in the collar of the senator's dog, Peewee, allowing General Warhawk to send Gripper and Black Dragon to abduct Peewee and obtain the chip.
45	"When S.A.V.A.G.E. Stole Santa"	Sheryl Scarborough	November 14, 1986
During Christmas in Colorado, Rambo and Turbo rescue a kid when visiting Rambo's old friend Kris Kaufman who is a former rocket scientist turned toy maker for an orphanage that goes around his village on Christmas dressed as Santa Claus. At the same time, General Warhawk, Sergeant Havoc and Gripper have plans for Kris to make weapons for S.A.V.A.G.E.
46	"Blockbuster"	Steve Hayes	November 17, 1986
Rambo, Kat, and Turbo are joined by Rambo's old friend T.D. "Touchdown" Jackson at the time when Mad Dog's biker gang forces elderly couples out of their homes as part of General Warhawk's plot to dig into a military base and steal a top secret new supertank.
47	"Supertrooper"	Jack Bornoff	November 18, 1986
General Warhawk steals a WWII vintage U-Boat No.505 from the Museum of Science and Industry. In the submarine, there is a map showing the location of a German Supertrooper developed during the war by combining the cells of German soldiers and vicious animals. This process was created by an Egyptian scientist named Dr. Jamal who General Warhawk has enlisted as part of his plot to make more Supertroopers like it.
48	"Warhawk's Fortress"	Matt Uitz	November 19, 1986
Following some security guards stopping a thief from stealing the plans to some prototype combat military vehicles, Rambo, Kat, Turbo, T.D. and White Dragon go undercover where three accidents that Rambo survives are discovered to be the work of the plant's foreman Mr. Dirkson who is allied with General Warhawk in a plot to steal the prototypes.
49	"The Konichi"	Jack Bornoff	November 20, 1986
Rambo's team is sent to guard the plans for a new medical laser that are being transported from Cleveland to St. Louis by train. When Turbo encounters a female doctor named Dr. Omi Ikawa when she treats his sprained ankle following an accident, Black Dragon appears and identifies Omi as the last of the Konichi Ninja Clan. Black Dragon also states that her supervisor Dr. Nori Yamata was the last living ninja of another clan that dishonored the Konichi.
50	"Robot Raid"	Jack Bornoff	November 21, 1986
A girl named Jennifer (who will soon be the leader of a major defense company) is targeted by S.A.V.A.G.E. when her uncle, Merick (the current president of the company), wants to stop the transition. She escapes S.A.V.A.G.E.'s soldiers and runs into Rambo and the Force of Freedom who protects her from the attacks of S.A.V.A.G.E.'s mad scientist Dr. Hyde, his cybernetic henchmen X-Ray, and their android Max.
51	"Alphas, Arms, and Ambush: Part 1"	Mike Chain	November 24, 1986
Rambo's team is enlisted to help General Stedring's Alpha Force guard a ship loaded with NATO military supplies bound for Europe. Meanwhile, General Warhawk's men attack and capture a remote NATO base in Norway.
52	"Alphas, Arms, and Ambush: Part 2"	Mike Chain	November 25, 1986
After evading a missile launched at their helicopter by Black Dragon, Rambo's team and the Alpha Force work to prevent General Warhawk from auctioning the NATO military supplies to the other terrorists, with one of them being the dreaded Al-Khamsen, and rescue Colonel Trautman, General Stedring and the others.
53	"Crash"	Dick Sebast	November 26, 1986
When a plane carrying a doctor and his patient Nicky (who is in need of a kidney operation) crashes near Rambo's mountain cabin, Rambo must get them to the hospital before S.A.V.A.G.E. gets to them first.
54	"Mirage"	Barbara Chain	November 27, 1986
The Force of Freedom end up springing to action when General Warhawk kidnaps the Vice President of the United States and half of the Cabinet when their plane ends up disappearing over the China Seas.
55	"Blind Luck"	Mike Chain	November 28, 1986
Rambo ends up blinded during his fight on an aircraft carrier against Max as his friends are captured by General Warhawk's men. With help from a blind girl named Stacy and regaining his sight following a fight with Mad Dog's biker gang, Rambo ends up turning the tables against S.A.V.A.G.E.
56	"Turbo's Dilemma"	Matt Uitz	December 1, 1986
Black Dragon targets a new synthetic fuel at INT Laboratories which is guarded by Rambo, Kat, Turbo and T.D. "Touchdown" Jackson. At the same time, Turbo finds out that his mother has been captured by a motorcycle gang. Note: This was the second out of three attempts by General Stedring to discredit Rambo and disband the Force of Freedom.
57	"Masquerade"	Barbara Chain	December 2, 1986
General Warhawk and S.A.V.A.G.E. plan to capture General Bernard who is the leader of the Starfire Defense Team. Rambo, the Force of Freedom and Colonel Trautman use a General Bernard lookalike named Corporal Justin Wilbur in order to fool S.A.V.A.G.E. into thinking that he is General Bernard.
58	"Just Say No"	Barbara Chain	December 8, 1986
Rambo visits his old friend Chopper and learns that his teenage son Johnny is involved in a drug gang who are allied with General Warhawk in a plot to smuggle cocaine called "Crack."
59	"Monster Island"	Steve Hayes	December 9, 1986
Rambo, Kat, Turbo, T.D. and Chief investigate a sea monster in the Gulf of Alaska and come across an island filled with strange hybrid animals (like crocodile/condor hybrids, giraffe/deer hybrids, etc.). Rambo discovers that the strange hybrid animals are the work of Dr. Hyde and his animal cell-splicing knowledge as part of General Warhawk's latest plot for world domination.
60	"Quarterback Sneak"	Mike Chain	December 10, 1986
Rambo and T.D., whilst going undercover on a professional team during an exhibition game in a communist country of Talinia, the guys save a scientist and defectors named Professor Ivanovich and his daughter Tanya when he is targeted by General Warhawk, Premier Moltov and Talinian Secret Police leader Zared who plan to extract the formula for a proton bomb from Professor Ivanovich while at the same time playing football...for freedom!.
61	"Sepulcher of Power"	Jack Bornoff	December 11, 1986
Max steals some ancient Mayan tablets (which will lead whoever possesses them to the Mayan Sepulcher) from Dr. Ramirez in the middle of the night in his office. S.A.V.A.G.E. plans to steal the Mayan Sepulcher and use to unite the Mayans and make General Warhawk their leader. It is up to the Force of Freedom to prevent S.A.V.A.G.E. from reaching the Mayan Sepulcher first.
62	"The Twin Within"	Steve Hayes	December 12, 1986
Black Dragon takes the place of his twin brother White Dragon in order to infiltrate the Force of Freedom and relay information of the radioactive material and a supertank to General Warhawk. Note: This was the final one out of three attempts by General Stedring to discredit Rambo and disband the Force of Freedom which barely succeeded, yet foiled.
63	"S.A.V.A.G.E. Space"	Matt Uitz	December 15, 1986
Mad Dog and his biker gang hijack the space shuttle Xenon which is also a laser-defense space station. General Warhawk plans to use Xenon to blow up satellites if his demands aren't met. It is up to the Force of Freedom to prevent S.A.V.A.G.E. from using the Xenon to destroy the satellites.
64	"Change of Face"	Jack Bornoff	December 17, 1986
Dr. Hyde creates a robot shapeshifter that can replicate anyone like Senator Thorne and the President.
65	"Horror of the Highlands"	Barbara Chain	December 18, 1986
T.D. "Touchdown" Jackson visits his Uncle George in Scotland. When a remote-controlled submarine version of the Loch Ness Monster operated by General Warhawk terrorizes Loch Ness, T.D. calls in the rest of the Force of Freedom to help stop General Warhawk and his mechanical Loch Ness Monster.

== Cast ==
=== Principal voice actors ===
- Neil Ross - John J. Rambo
- Michael Ansara - General Warhawk
- James Avery - Edward "Turbo" Hayes, X-Ray
- Peter Cullen - Sergeant Havoc, Razor, Captain Scar (in "Pirate Peril"), Dr. Blackburn (in "Terror Beneath the Sea"), Uncle George (in "Horror in the Highlands")
- George DiCenzo - T.D. "Touchdown" Jackson (uncredited)
- Edmund Gilbert - Nomad, Jerkface, Dr. Hyde, President Ramón ("Tierra Libre" miniseries), Major Gómez (in "The Taking of Tierra Libre")
- Robert Ito - Black Dragon, White Dragon, Dr. David Taylor (in "The Halley Microbe")
- Mona Marshall - Katherine "K.A.T." Taylor, Estrella ("Tierra Libre" miniseries), Pandora (in "Raid on Las Vegas"), Varinia (in "Fire in the Sky"), Mombo Igthayan (in "Night of the Voodoo Moon")
- Alan Oppenheimer - Colonel Samuel Trautman, Chief, Count (in "Deadly Keep," "Return of the Count"), Mike Flynn (in "The Doomsday Machine")
- Lennie Weinrib - Gripper, Max, Admiral Nomak (in "Raise the Yamato," "Pirate Peril"), Sheik Hassat (in "Guns over the Suez"), General Stedring (in "Mephisto's Magic," "Alphas, Arms and Ambush")
- Frank Welker - Mad Dog, Animal, Mephisto (in "Mephisto's Magic"), Supertrooper (in "Supertrooper")

=== Additional voices ===
- Michael Bell - General Ranjid (in "The Lost City of Acra")
- Dale Ishimoto - Rama (in "Cult of the Cobra"), Major Sing (in "Cult of the Cobra")
- Russi Taylor - Bobby (in "Exercise in Terror"), Teacher (in "Exercise in Terror)

The rest of the additional voices were all uncredited:

- Susan Blu - Stacy (in "Blind Luck")
- Phil Clarke - Professor Ivanovich (in "Quarterback Sneak")
- Dick Gautier - Tommy (in "Quarterback Sneak"), Premier Motoff (in "Quarterback Sneak")
- Dana Hill - Johnny (in "Just Say No")
- Keye Luke - President Wang (in "Vote of Terror")
- Robert Ridgely - Alpha Leader (in "Alphas, Arms and Ambush")
- Stanley Ralph Ross - Snakebite, Dr. Monk (in "Mirage")
- John Stephenson - Doctor (in "Crash")
- Janet Waldo - Danny (in "Return of the Count"), Cathy (in "Return of the Count")

== Crew ==
- Jack Bornoff - Assistant Story Editor
- Michael Chain - Head Writer
- Michael Hack - Voice Director

== Production ==
Rambo: The Force of Freedom was produced by Ruby-Spears Enterprises.

Reviewers have said that Rambo: The Force of Freedom was obviously inspired by the success of G.I. Joe: A Real American Hero (1983–86), Sergio Pereira of Comic Book Resources noting the similarities between S.A.V.A.G.E. and COBRA, and between Colonel Trautman and General Hawk. According to a 1987 interview with Doug Thompson of the Toy Manufactures of America, the Coleco company spent $15 million on the show.

While some have alleged that the show used child psychologists who recommended that the cartoon not make any references to Vietnam, POWs, or Rambo's experiences in 1982's First Blood and 1985's Rambo: First Blood Part II, the show's head writer, Michael Chain, denies this and instead states that his previous experience in producing children's programming led him to make sure that Rambo would not "have an adverse effect on the psyche of children".

Chain was chosen for the series in part because of his background in martial arts and weapons, and except when promoting a specific toy, he always used real weapons in the show's stories. Fictional countries and back-stories are featured, some of them echoing historical or current events. In order to meet Federal Communications Commission decency standards and make the series viewable for children, the violence level was significantly reduced compared to the films.

The voice acting was always recorded as an ensemble, with all the cast members for each episode recording their parts together.

Neither Rambo's creator David Morrell nor the actor and screenwriter Sylvester Stallone were involved in the production. Though Morrell spoke positively about the show, especially its usage of Jerry Goldsmith's music from the Rambo films, Stallone was annoyed and embarrassed that Rambo was used as a cartoon character, saying that Rambo was not appropriate for children.

== Music ==
Jerry Goldsmith's scores for First Blood and Rambo: First Blood Part II were licensed for use in the series and tracked throughout (mostly from Rambo: First Blood Part II), with his music for the film's trailer for Rambo: First Blood Part II, used as the opening and closing themes. It was supplemented by original music composed by Haim Saban and Shuki Levy, who received an "additional music by" credit.

== Release ==
=== Broadcast ===
Rambo: The Force of Freedom debuted on April 15, 1986, as a five-part miniseries, and returned that September as a daily cartoon.

=== Home media ===
Lionsgate Home Entertainment (which also owns the DVD rights to the Rambo films) and StudioCanal (the current owner of the Rambo franchise) has released the entire series on DVD in Region 1 in 6 volume sets.

DVD name	Ep #	Release date
Volume 1: A World of Trouble	11	June 14, 2005
Volume 2: Enter The Dragon	11	June 14, 2005
Volume 3: S.A.V.A.G.E. Island	10	September 13, 2005
Volume 4: Up In Arms	11	September 13, 2005
Volume 5: Snow Raid	11	December 13, 2005
Volume 6: Face of Freedom	11	December 13, 2005

== Other media ==
=== Toys ===
A Rambo action figure line was produced Coleco as a tie-in to the animated series. The first series released in 1986 consisted of eleven 6.25" figures (including two Rambo figures), plus a few playsets and vehicles. The second series, released in 1987, consisted of seven additional figures and a few more playsets, was only partially released in the United States.

=== Books ===
A book and tape set adapting the original five-part episode miniseries titled Rambo: The Rescue was published by Kid Stuff Records in 1987. Another full series of five book and tape sets were published by Rainbow Communications Ltd. from 1985 to 1986, as part of its "Rainbow Theatre" product line; the four books adapted the episodes "Guns Over the Suez", "The Lost City of Arca", "Pirates Peril" and "Alphas, Arms and Ambush".

Two more book series were published in the United Kingdom through World Distributors from 1986 to 1987; four in the Little Owl Superstars line of childrens books: "The Wolves of Daemon", "Nightstrike", "Sea of Flames" and "The Mask of Mardar"; and another four in the Mini World: "Operation Suicide", "Sergeant Havoc's Challenge", "Skyjack" and "Curse of Karmoun".

Two annuals, one for 1987 and another for 1988, a mini coloring book and an activity book were published by World Distributors, also four volumes of coloring and activity books based on the series by Modern Publishing in 1986.
