= Suffolk Historic District =

Historic district in Virginia, United States

- U.S. National Register of Historic Places
- U.S. Historic district
- Virginia Landmarks Register
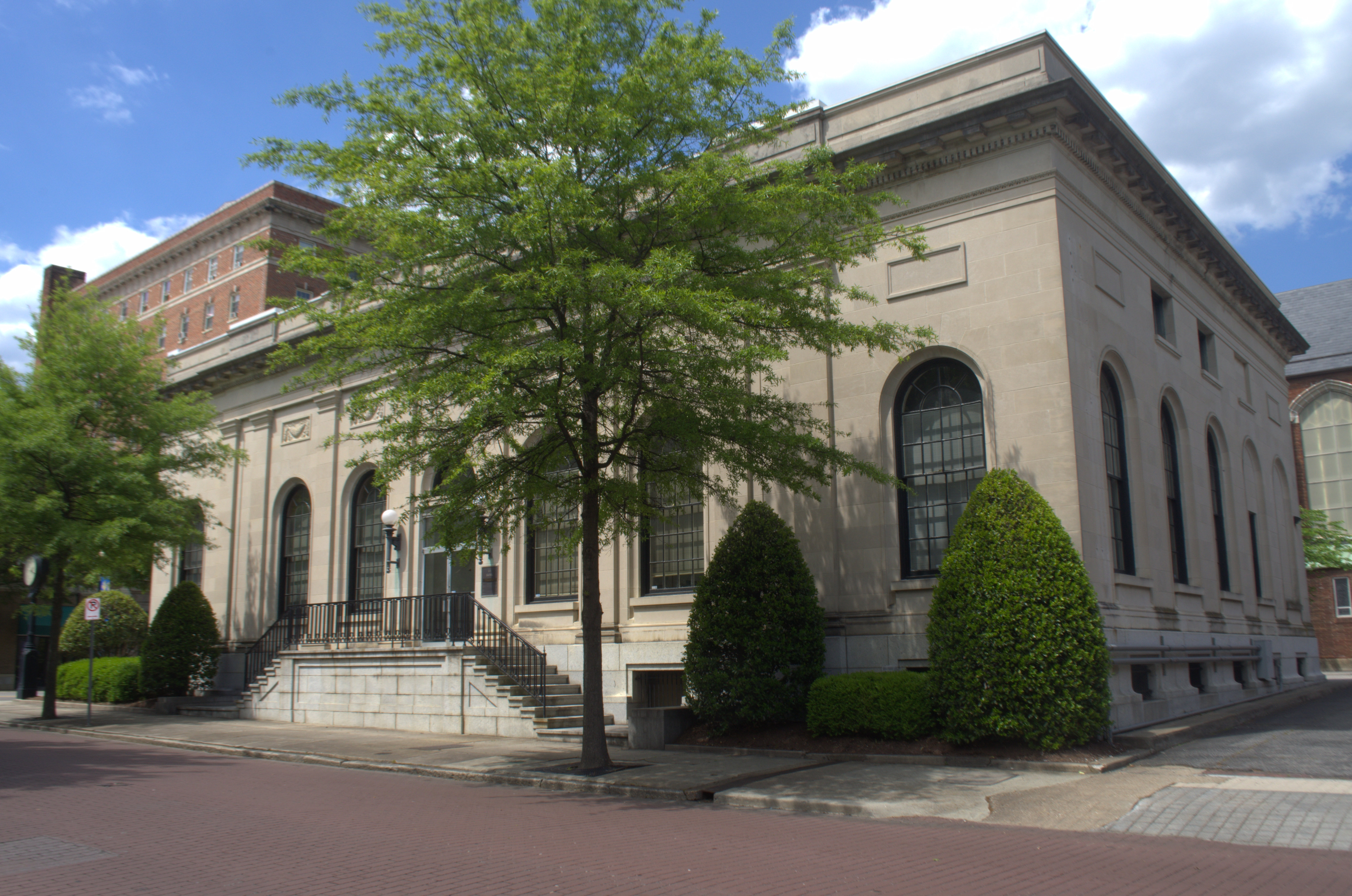

- Location within Virginia Location within the United States
- Location: Roughly bounded by RR tracks, Hill St., Central Ave., Holladay, Washington, N. Saratoga and Pine Sts.; Roughly along N. Main St., from Constance Rd., to Norfolk and Western RR Tracks; Roughly bounded by N and W RR tracks, County St., and Liberty St., Bank St., Market St., Clay St. and Poplar Sts.; Pinner and Central Ave. and W. Washington St., Suffolk, Virginia
- Coordinates: 36°43′49″N 76°34′52″W
- Area: 162.1 acres (65.6 ha)
- Architectural style: Late 19th And 20th Century Revivals, Bungalow/craftsman, Greek Revival, Queen Anne, Late Victorian
- NRHP reference No.: 87000631, 99000705 (Boundary Increase), 02000976 (Boundary Increase), 04001295 (Boundary Increase)
- VLR No.: 133-0072

Significant dates
- Added to NRHP: June 22, 1987, June 10, 1999 (Boundary Increase), September 14, 2002 (Boundary Increase), December 3, 2004 (Boundary Increase)
- Designated VLR: December 9, 1986, September 14, 1998, June 12, 2002, September 8, 2004

Suffolk Historic District is a national historic district located at Suffolk, Virginia. The district encompasses 514 contributing buildings, 3 contributing structures, and 3 contributing objects in Suffolk. The district includes a variety of residential, commercial, governmental, and institutional buildings. They are in a variety of vernacular and popular 19th and 20th century architectural styles including Greek Revival, Queen Anne, and Bungalow. Notable buildings include the Allmond Building (1914), Macedonia A.M.E. Church (c. 1870), National Bank of Suffolk (1914-1920), the Old Post Office (c. 1785), old Nansemond County Courthouse (c. 1837), John Granberry house (c. 1795), Richard Seth Eley House (1878), Jones Building (c. 1925), Suffolk Towers, Virginia Apartments (1918-1920), Causey-Kendrick house (1882), Masonic Hall (1911), Suffolk High School (1922), Jefferson High School (1911), old Methodist Church (1861), St. Paul's Episcopal Church (1895), Suffolk Christian Church (1893), and Congregation of Agudath Achin. Located in the district are the separately listed Phoenix Bank of Nansemond, Professional Building, and Riddick House.

It was added to the National Register of Historic Places in 1987, with boundary increases in 1999, 2002, and 2004.
