= Gung Ho (film) =

1986 film by Ron Howard

- Theatrical release poster
- Directed by: Ron Howard
- Screenplay by: Lowell Ganz; Babaloo Mandel
- Story by: Edwin Blum; Lowell Ganz; Babaloo Mandel
- Produced by: Deborah Blum; Tony Ganz
- Starring: Michael Keaton
- Cinematography: Donald Peterman
- Edited by: Daniel P. Hanley; Mike Hill
- Music by: Thomas Newman
- Distributed by: Paramount Pictures
- Release date: March 14, 1986
- Running time: 112 minutes
- Country: United States
- Languages: English; Japanese
- Budget: $13 million
- Box office: $36,611,610

Gung Ho (released in Australia and New Zealand as Working Class Man) is a 1986 American comedy film directed by Ron Howard and starring Michael Keaton. The story portrays the takeover of an American car plant by a Japanese corporation (although the title phrase is an Americanized Chinese term). Gung Ho was released by Paramount Pictures on March 14, 1986. The film received mixed to negative reviews from critics and grossed $36,611,610 against a $13 million budget. A short-lived television series based on the film followed in December 1986.

== Plot ==
In fictional Hadleyville, Pennsylvania, the local auto plant, which supplied most of the town's jobs, has been closed for nine months. Former foreman Hunt Stevenson goes to Tokyo to try to convince the Assan Motors Corporation to reopen the plant. The Japanese company agrees and, upon their arrival in the United States, they take advantage of the desperate work force to institute many changes. The workers are not permitted a union, are paid lower wages, are moved around within the factory so that each worker learns every job, and are held to seemingly impossible standards of efficiency and quality. Adding to the strain in the relationship, the Americans find humor in the demand that they do calisthenics as a group each morning and that the Japanese executives eat their lunches with chopsticks and bathe together in the river near the factory. The workers also display a poor work ethic and lackadaisical attitude toward quality control.

The Japanese executive in charge of the plant is Takahara "Kaz" Kazihiro, who has been a failure in his career thus far because he is too lenient on his workers. When Hunt first meets Kaz in Japan, the latter is being ridiculed by his peers and being required to wear ribbons of shame. He has been given one final chance to redeem himself by making the American plant a success. Intent on becoming the strict manager his superiors expect, he gives Hunt a large promotion on the condition that he work as a liaison between the Japanese management and the American workers, to smooth the transition and convince the workers to obey the new rules. More concerned with keeping his promotion than with the welfare of his fellow workers, Hunt does everything he can to trick the American workers into compliance, but the culture clash becomes too great and he begins to lose control of the men.

In an attempt to solve the problem, Hunt makes a deal with Kaz: if the plant can produce 15,000 cars in one month, thereby making it as productive as the best Japanese auto plant, then the workers will all be given raises and jobs will be created for the remaining unemployed workers in the town. However, if the workers fall even one car short, they will get nothing. When Hunt calls an assembly to tell the workers about the deal, they balk at the idea of making so many cars in so short a time. Under pressure from the crowd, Hunt lies and says that if they make 13,000, they will get a partial raise. After nearly a month of working long hours toward a goal of 13,000—despite Hunt's pleas for them to aim for the full 15,000—the truth is discovered and the workers walk off the job.

At the town's annual 4th of July picnic, Hadleyville mayor Conrad Zwart informs the people that Assan Motors plans to abandon the factory again because of the work stoppage, which would mean the end of the town. The mayor threatens to kill Hunt, but Willie, one of the workers, intervenes, insisting that Hunt is not to blame for the closure. Zwart abandons the picnic, even more furious with the townspeople taking Hunt's word over his. Hunt comes clean about the 15,000 car deal. He responds by addressing his observations that the real reason the workers are facing such difficulties is because the Japanese have the work ethic that too many Americans have abandoned. While his audience is not impressed, Hunt, hoping to save the town and atone for his deception, and Kaz, desperate to show his worth to his superiors, go back into the factory the next day and begin to build cars by themselves. Inspired, the workers return and continue to work toward their goal and pursue it with the level of diligence the Japanese managers had encouraged. Just before the final inspection, Hunt and the workers line up a number of incomplete cars in hopes of fooling the executives. The ruse fails when the car that Hunt had supposedly bought for himself falls apart when he attempts to drive it away. The strict CEO is nonetheless impressed by the workers' performance and declares the goal met, calling them a "Good team," to which Kazuhiro replies "Good men."

As the end credits roll, the workers and management have compromised, with the latter agreeing to partially ease up on their requirements and pay the employees better while the workers agree to be more cooperative, such as participating in the morning calisthenics, which are now made more enjoyable with the addition of aerobics class-style American rock music.

== Cast ==
- Michael Keaton as Hunt Stevenson
- Gedde Watanabe as Takahara "Kaz" Kazihiro, the plant manager
- George Wendt as Buster Hershiser, a factory worker and Hunt's friend
- John Turturro as Willie, another worker, also Hunt's friend
- Mimi Rogers as Audrey, Hunt's girlfriend
- So Yamamura as Mr. Sakamoto, CEO of Assan Motors
- Sab Shimono as Saito
- Rick Overton as Googie Googleman
- Clint Howard as Paul
- Jihmi Kennedy as Junior
- Michelle Johnson as Heather DiStefano
- Rodney Kageyama as Ito
- Rance Howard as Mayor Conrad Zwart
- Patti Yasutake as Umeki Kazihiro (as Patti Yasuiake)
- Jerry Tondo as Kazuo
- Robert Hammond as Auto worker

== Production ==
Aside from Pittsburgh and Tokyo, the film was shot at the Sevel Fiat manufacturing plant Argentina, which doubled as the Assan Motors plant. The Fiat Spazio and Regata were used as the Assan cars in the production line.

== Casting ==
Both Bill Murray and Eddie Murphy turned down the role of Hunt Stevenson.

== Soundtrack ==
The film's score was composed and orchestrated by Thomas Newman and features the songs "Don't Get Me Wrong" by The Pretenders, "Tuff Enuff" by The Fabulous Thunderbirds, "Breakin' the Ice" by Martha Wash, "Working Class Man" by Jimmy Barnes, "Can't Wait Another Minute" by Five Star, and "We're Not Gonna Take It" by Twisted Sister.

== Reception ==
On Rotten Tomatoes the film has a 39% rating based on reviews from 23 critics. On Metacritic it has a score of 48% based on reviews from 9 critics, indicating "mixed or average" reviews. Audiences surveyed by CinemaScore gave the film a grade "B" on scale of A to F.

=== Critical response ===
Vincent Canby of The New York Times wrote: "It's more cheerful than funny, and so insistently ungrudging about Americans and Japanese alike that its satire cuts like a wet sponge." Gene Siskel of the Chicago Tribune gave it a positive review and wrote: "The film would be funnier and more provocative if it took a stronger stand on one side or the other, but Howard chooses to hedge his bets, selecting an ending that celebrates brotherhood more than the strongly hinted- at notion that American workers would do well to get off their featherbedding backs."

== Influence ==
Toyota's executives in Japan have used Gung Ho as an example of how not to manage Americans.
