= Suffolk Transit =

Public transit operator in Suffolk, Virginia

- Parent: Virginia Regional Transit
- Founded: 2012
- Locale: Suffolk, Virginia
- Service type: Fixed route bus service
- Annual ridership: 108,658 (2022)
- Fuel type: Diesel, electric
- Manager: Maria Ptakowski
- Website: www.suffolkva.us/429/Suffolk-Transit

Suffolk Transit is the provider of bus service within Suffolk, Virginia. Suffolk Transit provides six bus routes with limited service on Saturday and no service on Sunday. Paratransit services are also provided. The company operates minibuses with a capacity of 19 passengers.

== History ==
Suffolk, Virginia was served by Hampton Roads Transit (HRT) until around late 2011, when HRT stopped serving the area due to low ridership and monetary concerns. Suffolk Transit was opened on January 1, 2012, operated by the company Virginia Regional Transit. The service originally had two routes with ten bus stops, which by 2023 had grown to six bus routes 180 bus stops. Ridership in the first year was 24,662.

In 2022, Suffolk Transit received a grant from the Department of Transportation to purchase two electric buses and charging stations. Ridership in 2022 was 108,658. The company has also been evaluating a commuter bus route to Windsor, Virginia pending funding and have a plan for a commuter bus route between the industrial park area in Suffolk and the Victory Crossing area in Portsmouth, Virginia. Suffolk Transit also plans to increase collaboration with other nearby bus operators, HRT and Williamsburg Area Transit Authority to increase access to transit in the area. HRT also operates an express bus route in the area that goes to the Amazon warehouse.

== Routes ==
Suffolk Transit operates six routes:

- Green Route - Saratoga / Godwin Blvd
- Orange Route - White Marsh / East Washington
- Red Route - Magnolia Gardens / Pruden Blvd
- Yellow Route - Holland Rd / Paul D Camp
- Pink Route - Downtown / N. Suffolk Connector
- Purple Route - N. Suffolk Bridge Rd / College Dr.

== See also ==
- Public transportation in the United States
