= Robert Hammond (writer) =

- Other names: Bob Hammond
- Occupations: Author, Film Producer

Robert Hammond aka Bob Hammond is an author, film producer, public speaker and occasional actor. He is the author of Ready When You Are: Cecil B. DeMille’s Ten Commandments for Success, Life After Debt and Repair Your Own Credit.

== Background ==
Hammond is a consumer advocate. He has been featured on radio and television in the United States discussing matters relating to debt and financial management. In his publications he has said the only hope to survive and prosper in the approaching cashless society is to get out of debt and clean up your credit rating. His novel C. B. DeMille: The Man Who Invented Hollywood looks at DeMille's film career and also his beginnings as a failed stage actor.

== Publications ==
Hammond's Life After Debt which was published by Career Press in 2000 was the third in a series of popular self-help books, with the first published in 1993. It addresses some of the warning signs of credit trouble such as paying the minimum payment, using credit cards to obtain cash advances. It even advises cutting them up. Life Without Debt looks at the psychology behind the slide into debt and how people are seduced into situations where they create bills that they can't pay. In his 2001 publication, Repair Your Own Credit, he writes that 70% of Americans have derogatory info in their credit histories and to beware of companies that charge up front fees of several hundred dollars to clean one's credit. He also writes in the book that one needs to know how to contact credit bureaus, look at reports, and how to determine what is and isn't accurate. He also advises not to close a 5 year old credit card that has been used only once as it can wipe out favoreable credit history.

His novel The Light is a story about Abel Adams who fights his way through drug addiction.

List (selective)
Title	Publisher	ISBN	Year	Notes #
Life After Debt	Career Press	ISBN 1564141012, 9781564141019	1993	
How To Beat The Credit Bureaus	Paladin Press	ISBN 978-0873645577	1990	
How To Get All The Credit You Want And Erase Your Bad Credit Record	Citadel Press, Carol Publishing Group	ISBN 0-8065-1397-7	2000	
Ready When You Are: Cecil B. DeMille's Ten Commandments for Success	New Way Press	ISBN 0615673708	2012	
The Light	New Way Press	ISBN 9780615796567	2013	

== Film ==
Acting roles (selective)
Title	Role	Director	Year	Notes #
Alligator	Wedding guest	Lewis Teague	1980	
Gung Ho	Auto Worker #1	Ron Howard	1986	
Con Artist	Jeffry Cook	Glenda Zurita	2010	

Production roles (selective)
Title	Role	Director	Year	Notes #
Destiny's Lance	Producer, executive producer	D.C. Kasundra	2010	
The Girl at the End of the World	Associate producer	Dave McGlone, Karl McGlone	2014	
Fragile Storm	Executive producer	Dawn Fields	2015	
