= Deadly Daphne's Revenge =

- Promotional poster
- Directed by: Richard Gardner
- Written by: Tim Bennett; Richard Gardner
- Produced by: Marc Castor; Dick Horton; M. Mutimier
- Starring: Anthony Holt; Richard Gardner; Laurie Tait Partridge; Candy Castillo
- Cinematography: Vern Virlene
- Edited by: Mark Castor
- Music by: John Banning
- Distributed by: Troma Entertainment
- Release date: 1987
- Running time: 90 minutes
- Country: United States
- Language: English

Deadly Daphne's Revenge, also known as The Hunting Season, is a 1987 American revenge film directed by Richard Gardner and starring Anthony Holt, Gardner, Laurie Tait Partridge, Candy Castillo, James Avery, and Jody Jaress. It follows a hitchhiker who pursues revenge after being abducted by a group of hunters, one of whom rapes her.

== Cast ==
- Anthony Holt as Charlie Johnson
- Richard Gardner as Steve
- Laurie Tait Partridge as Cindy Langely
- Candy Castillo as Daphne Wood
- James Avery as Detective Wood
- Jody Jaress as Rhea

== Production ==
The film was shot on location in Orange County, California.

== Release ==
The film was completed circa 1979–1981 as The Hunting Season and was later acquired by Troma Entertainment, who screened at the Cannes Film Market in May 1987 under the title Deadly Daphne's Revenge.

Vinegar Syndrome released the film in a limited edition Blu-ray and DVD set on May 25, 2018.
