= Riddick House (Suffolk, Virginia) =

Historic house in Virginia, United States

- U.S. National Register of Historic Places
- U.S. Historic district – Contributing property
- Virginia Landmarks Register
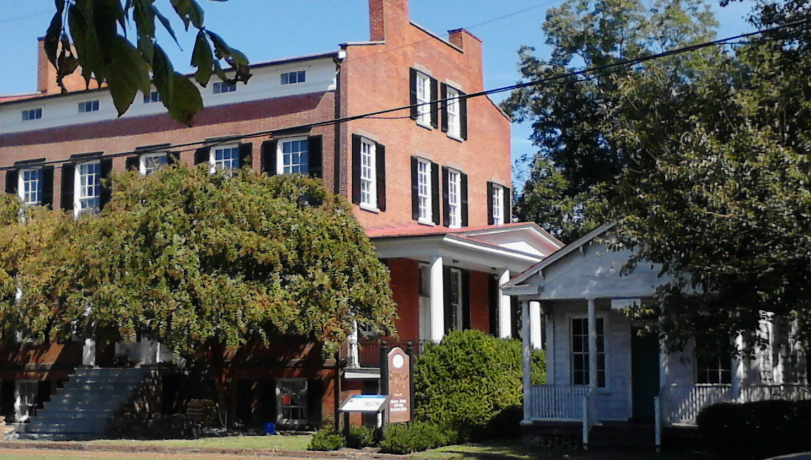

- Location within Virginia Location within the United States
- Location: 510 Main St., Suffolk, Virginia
- Coordinates: 36°44′13″N 76°34′57″W
- Area: less than one acre
- Built: 1837
- Architectural style: Greek Revival
- NRHP reference No.: 74002247
- VLR No.: 133-0003

Significant dates
- Added to NRHP: May 2, 1974
- Designated VLR: November 20, 1973

Riddick House, also known as Riddicks Folly, is a historic home located at Suffolk, Virginia. It was built in 1837, and is a 2 1/2-story, five bay by four bay, Greek Revival-style brick townhouse. The front facade features a one-story diastyle Doric order portico with a triangular pediment supported by two fluted columns and two plain pilasters. It also has a one-story tetrastyle portico added across the south end in 1905. During the American Civil War, General John J. Peck and his staff maintained Union Army staff headquarters in the house.

It was added to the National Register of Historic Places in 1974. It is located in the Suffolk Historic District.

Riddick's Folly is open as a historic house museum.
