= Fragile Storm =

- Directed by: Dawn Fields
- Written by: Dawn Fields; Carly Street
- Starring: Lance Henriksen; Mackenzie Mason; Jody Jaress
- Cinematography: Yaron Levy
- Edited by: Dawn Fields
- Music by: Giuseppe Alfano
- Distributed by: Palm Street Films
- Release date: September 24, 2015
- Running time: 10 minutes
- Country: United States
- Language: English

Fragile Storm is a short film which stars Lance Henriksen, Mackenzie Mason and Jody Jaress. It is about a young woman who is in the company of an older man. She comes to realize that the reason for her being with him, which is not good.

== Story ==
A young woman who is in the clutches of an older man must make her way from there. She comes to realize the reason why she is trapped there with him. She must leave! The older man, Norman is played by Lance Henriksen.

== Background on the film ==
It was directed by Dawn Fields who also co wrote the story with Carly Street. The producers were Dawn Fields, Debbie Rankin and Kelly Raymer. The music is by Giuseppe Alfano aka Joe Alfano. One of the musicians who contributed is violinist Itamar Rashkovsky who is the son of Itzhak Rashkovsky. Robert Hammond was one of the film's executive producers.
