= Dawn Fields =

American film producer

- Born: Atlanta, Georgia
- Occupations: Film producer, director, writer
- Years active: 1990s–present

Dawn Fields is a Los Angeles based film producer, director and writer who has worked in the film and television industry since the 1990s. In 2015/2016, her short film Fragile Storm, starring Lance Henriksen (Aliens, Millennium), Mackenzie Mason, and Jody Jaress, garnered numerous film festival awards. She is currently in development as the writer/director/producer of the Christmas horror/fantasy Zombie Elves and is also the writer/director/producer of the multi-award winningshort film FOUND and the romantic dramedy Touch. Before making the transition to writer/director, Fields worked as a producer, editor, assistant director, production manager and production assistant for such companies as Lucasfilm, Tristar, Twentieth Century Fox, Bret Ratner's Rat Productions, Orion, Lorimar, Morgan Creek, ABC, NBC/Universal and Aaron Spelling Productions. In the beginning of her career she worked on such notable projects as The Young Indiana Jones Chronicles (with George Lucas), Love Potion No. 9 (Sandra Bullock and Tate Donovan), Wilder Napalm (Dennis Quaid and Debra Winger), Free-Jack (Mick Jagger and Emelio Esteves) and Big Dreams and Broken Hearts: The Dottie West Story (Michelle Lee).

== Background ==
Fields is originally from Atlanta, Georgia. She runs a production company in Los Angeles called Palm Street Films. In addition to film work she produced an award-winning music video for Gospel R&B artist Vickie Winans.

== Career ==
=== 1990s ===
In 1991, she was a production assistant in the Geoff Murphy directed film Freejack. The following year she worked in the same capacity in the made-for-television film Grass Roots which was directed by Jerry London. In 1993, she was the assistant director for Mardi Gras for the Devil which was directed by David A Prior, and starred Robert Davi, Michael Ironside and Lesley-Anne Down. Also that year she was production assistant in Wilder Napalm which was directed by Glen Gordon Caron, and starred Debra Winger and Dennis Quaid.

=== 2000s ===
In 2009, Fields began filming a documentary about an abandoned water park called Rock-A-Hoola.

Her short film Touch that was co-produced with James Popiden starred Dove Meir and Natalie Shaw. It was shown at the 2014 Dances With Films festival in Los Angeles. In 2014 she directed Fragile Storm. She had co-written the story with Carly Street. It was co-produced by Debbie Rankin, James Popiden, and Kelly Raymer. It starred Lance Henriksen, Mackenzie Mason, and Jody Jaress.

== Filmography (selective) ==
Film
Title	Role	Director	Year	Notes #
Freejack	production assistant	Geoff Murphy	1992	feature film
Grass Roots	production assistant	Jerry London	1992	made for television
Love Potion No. 9	production assistant	Dale Launer	1992	feature film
Mikey Was Here	casting director, first assistant director	Charles Busser	1992	short
Night Trap	second assistant director	David A. Prior	1993	feature film
Wilder Napalm	production assistant	Glenn Gordon Caron	1993	feature film
Big Dreams and Broken Hearts: The Dottie West Story	production assistant	Bill D'Elia	1995	made for television
The package	first assistant director	Thor Gold	2004	short
Si se puede!?	editor	Laurie Lamson	2006	short
Are You Serious?	editor	Rick Walls	2007	short
Electronica	first assistant director	Antonio Rivero aka Anthony Stabley	2007	short
Just Dinner: An Un-Romantic Comedy	first assistant director	Courtney G. Jones	2007	short
The Interrogation	producer, editor	Drew Mylrea	2013	short
Touch	director, producer, writer, editor	Dawn Fields	2013	short
Bonds & Lace	co-writer, director	Dawn Fields	2013	short
209	director, writer, producer, editor	Dawn Fields	2013	short
Super Who?	first assistant director	Thomai Hatsios	2013	short
Promises	director, writer, producer, editor	Dawn fields	2013	
Found	director, writer, producer, editor	Dawn Fields	2014	Short
The Dancer & the Boy	director, writer, producer	Dawn Fields	2014	Short
No Place for Us	first assistant director	Marisilda Garcia	2013	short
Better with Friends	director, editor	Dawn Fields	2014	short
Serpent's Lullaby	donor	Patricia Chica	2014	short
Fragile Storm	director, editor, producer, executive producer, co-writer	Dawn Fields	2015	short Awards; Connect Film Festival: Jury prize winner in Best Drama category 2015; Idyllwild International Festival of Cinema: IIFC Award winner in Best Short Film category Beloit International Film Festival: Co-winner in Best Narrative Short category
