= Phoenix Bank of Nansemond =

Historic commercial building in Virginia, United States

- U.S. National Register of Historic Places
- U.S. Historic district – Contributing property
- Virginia Landmarks Register
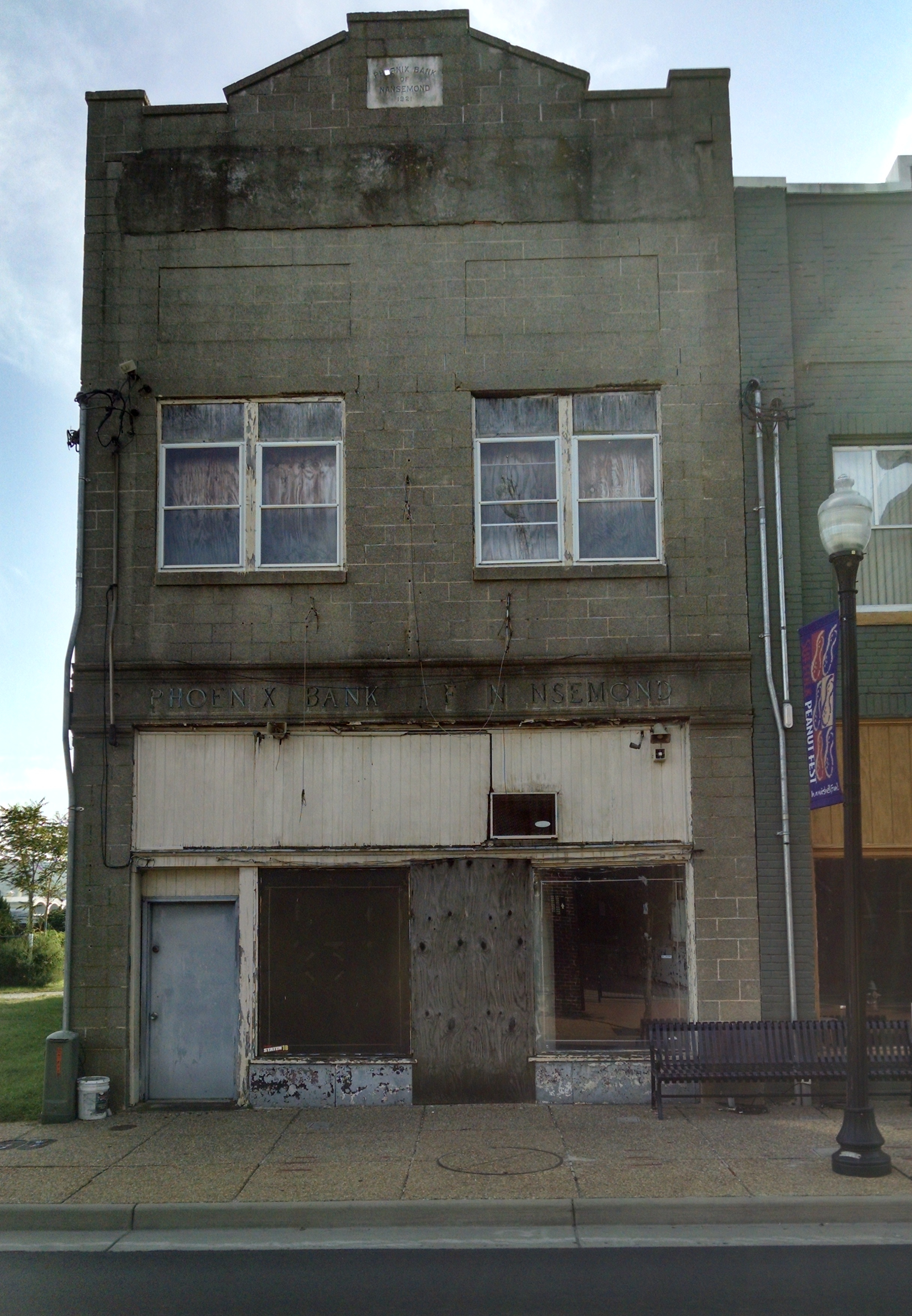

- Location within Virginia Location within the United States
- Location: 339 E. Washington St., Suffolk, Virginia
- Coordinates: 36°43′36″N 76°34′43″W
- Area: less than one acre
- Built: 1921
- Architectural style: Chicago, Commercial Style
- NRHP reference No.: 90002159
- VLR No.: 133-0086

Significant dates
- Added to NRHP: January 24, 1991
- Designated VLR: August 20, 1990

Phoenix Bank of Nansemond is a historic bank building located at Suffolk, Virginia. It was built in 1921, and is a two-story, two-bay, rectangular brick building. The bank was founded by a group of African-American entrepreneurs in 1919 and served the black farmers and laborers of Suffolk and surrounding Nansemond County. The bank survived until 1931.

It was added to the National Register of Historic Places in 1991. It is located in the Suffolk Historic District.
