= James Avery =

American actor (1945–2013)

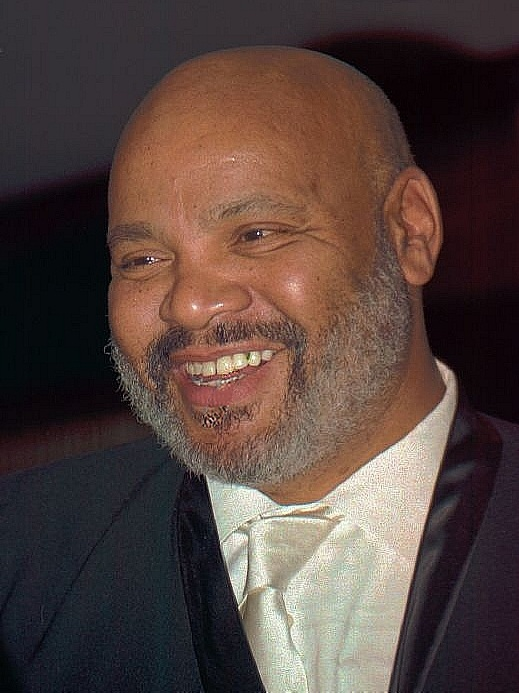
- Avery in 2001
- Born: James La Rue Avery; November 27, 1945; Pughsville, Virginia, U.S.
- Died: December 31, 2013 (aged 68); Glendale, California, U.S.
- Education: University of California, San Diego (BA)
- Occupation: Actor
- Years active: 1978–2013
- Spouse: Barbara Waters (m. 1988)

James La Rue Avery (November 27, 1945 – December 31, 2013) was an American actor. He was best known for his roles as Philip Banks in The Fresh Prince of Bel-Air, Judge Michael Conover on L.A. Law, Steve Yeager in The Brady Bunch Movie, and Dr. Crippen on The Closer (2005–2007); and as the voice actor for Shredder in Teenage Mutant Ninja Turtles and Haroud Hazi Bin in Aladdin.

== Early life ==
Avery was born on November 27, 1945, in Pughsville, Virginia (present-day Suffolk, Virginia), to mother Florence J. Avery. His father denied paternity and was not listed on his birth certificate. When he was a teenager, he moved with his mother to Atlantic City, New Jersey. He graduated from Atlantic City High School in 1963. He served in the U.S. Navy in the Vietnam War from 1968 to 1969, and then moved to San Diego, California, where he began to write poetry and TV scripts for PBS. Avery's first acting role was playing God in the play J.B. in 1971 at San Diego Community College.

He won an Emmy for production of "Ameda Speaks: Poet James Avery". He then received a scholarship to UC San Diego, where he attended Thurgood Marshall College (then Third College), earning a Bachelor of Arts degree in drama and literature in 1976.

== Career ==
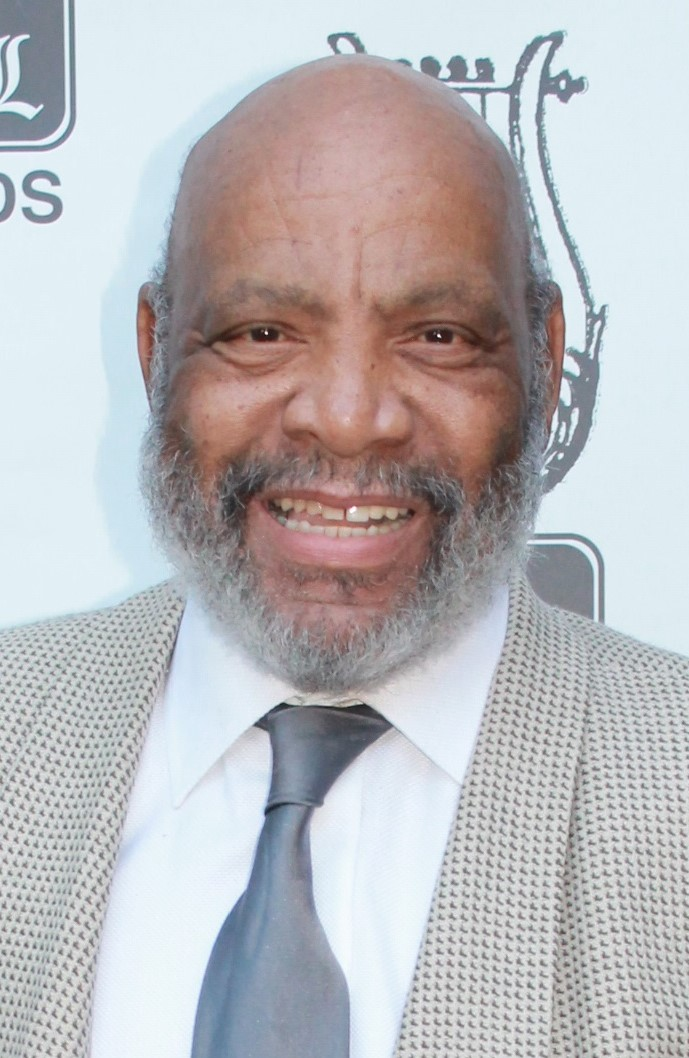
Avery in September 2013, three months before his death

Avery began his career in the 1980s with appearances in television series such as CBS's Simon & Simon, NBC's Hill Street Blues, Showtime's sitcom Brothers as Bubba Dean, Amen, FM and L.A. Law. He achieved prominence for his role as Philip Banks in The Fresh Prince of Bel-Air from 1990 to 1996, a character that was ranked number 34 in TV Guide's "50 Greatest TV Dads of All Time". After The Fresh Prince of Bel-Air ended, he played the lead role of Alonzo Sparks in the UPN comedy series Sparks that lasted for two seasons. Other notable roles in television included Dr. Crippen in The Closer, Charles Haysbert in The Division, and Michael Kelso's commanding officer at the police academy late in the series run of That '70s Show.

Avery's movie appearances included an uncredited role in The Blues Brothers (1980), a small role as a corrupt police officer in Fletch (1985), License to Drive (1988), The Brady Bunch Movie (1995), Dr. Dolittle 2 (2001), and Raise Your Voice (2004), among others. Among his most notable voice credits are the voices of Shredder in the first Teenage Mutant Ninja Turtles animated series, Br'er Bear in the Walt Disney World version of Splash Mountain and Kinect: Disneyland Adventures, and James Rhodes/War Machine in the 1990s Iron Man series. He also lent his powerful bass voice as Junkyard Dog in Hulk Hogan's Rock 'n' Wrestling (1985–1986), Turbo in Rambo and the Forces of Freedom (1986), Haroud Hazi Bin in Aladdin (1994), and Kahma in the film The Prince of Egypt (1998).

In 1997, Avery hosted the travel series "Going Places" on PBS.

Avery was the commencement speaker for his alma mater, UC San Diego's Thurgood Marshall College, in 2007 and again in 2012.

== Personal life ==
In 1988, Avery married Barbara Waters. Barbara was later dean of student life at Loyola Marymount University. He had no biological children, but was a stepfather to Barbara's son, Kevin Waters.

== Death ==
On December 31, 2013, Avery died at the age of 68 at Glendale Memorial Medical Center following complications from open heart surgery.

He received tributes from many of the cast members of The Fresh Prince of Bel-Air including Janet Hubert, Will Smith, Alfonso Ribeiro, and Joseph Marcell.

Avery was cremated and his ashes were scattered near the Pacific Ocean. In April 2020, Will Smith reunited with the cast of The Fresh Prince of Bel-Air on a video conference honoring Avery's best moments on the show.

== AveryFest ==
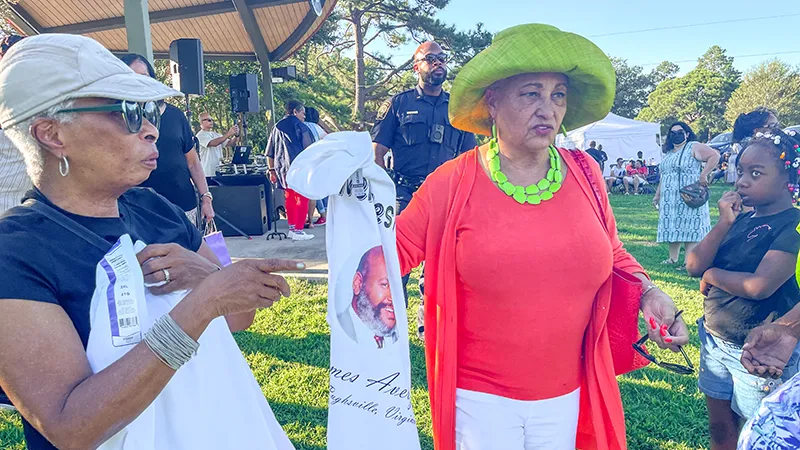
Barbara Avery and actress Daphne Maxwell Reid at the inaugural AveryFest in James Avery's hometown of Suffolk, Virginia

AveryFest is an annual African-American cultural and music festival held every September or October since 2023 in Suffolk, Virginia, near Avery's birthplace.

Featured at the 2023 festival were Barbara Avery, actress Daphne Maxwell Reid (his TV wife from The Fresh Prince of Bel-Air), and a special jazz spotlight in memory of Avery, who loved jazz music.

== Filmography ==
=== Film ===
Year	Title	Role	Notes
1978	Libra	Dr. Baker	
1980	The Stunt Man	Customer at Diner	Uncredited
1980	The Blues Brothers	Dancer	Uncredited
1985	Fletch	Detective #2	
1985	Appointment with Fear	Connors	
1985	Stoogemania	Gulch	
1986	Fist of the North Star	Fang	Voice (1991 Streamline Pictures dub)
1986	The Eleventh Commandment	Larry	
1986	8 Million Ways to Die	Deputy	
1986	The Ladies Club	Joe	
1986	Extremities	Security Guard	
1987	Three for the Road	Clarence	
1987	Nightflyers	Darryl	
1987	Deadly Daphne's Revenge	Det. Wood	
1987	Jake's M.O.	Abel Barnes	
1988	License to Drive	Les' DMV Examiner	
1991	Beastmaster 2: Through the Portal of Time	Lt. Coberly	
1991	Shout	Midnight Rider	Voice
1991	The Linguini Incident	Phil	
1993	Little Miss Millions	Agent Noah Hollander	
1995	The Brady Bunch Movie	Steve Yeager	
1997	Spirit Lost	Dr. Glidden	
1998	12 Bucks	Slow	
1998	The Prince of Egypt	Kahma	Voice
1999	Out in Fifty	Cappy	
1999	After Romeo		
2000	Dancing in September	Mr. Warner	
2001	Honeybee	Larry Dukes	
2001	Dr. Dolittle 2	Eldon	
2001	Chasing Sunsets	Mr. Burken	
2004	Raise Your Voice	Mr. Gantry	
2004	Hair Show	Seymour Gold	
2005	Lethal Eviction	Gus Winter	
2005	The Third Wish	George	
2005	Wheelmen	Vice President	
2005	A Christmas Wish	Saint	Short
2006	Restraining Order	Judge Sanderson	
2006	Think Tank	Uncle John	
2006	Danika	Teddy Johnson	
2007	Who's Your Caddy?	Caddy Mack	
2007	Divine Intervention	Rev. Matthews	
2008	His Good Will	Mr. Cooper	Short
2008	Leave with It	Dr. Leon	Short
2009	Steppin: The Movie	The Chancellor	
2010	Let the Game Begin	Mark Hanley	
2010	Stride	George	
2010	The Grind	Modelo Snipes	
2012	Valediction	Edward	Short
2014	Wish I Was Here	Audition actor #2	Final role, posthumous release

=== Television ===
Year	Title	Role	Notes
1983	Antony and Cleopatra	Mardian	Television film
1983	Tales of the Gold Monkey	Gabriel	Episode: "God Save the Queen"
1983	Newhart	Construction Guy	Episode: "Heaven Knows Mr. Utley"
1983	The Jeffersons	Coleman	Episode: "Father Christmas"
1983–1984	Simon & Simon	Huey, Roy	2 episodes
1984	Hill Street Blues	Tolliver	3 episodes
1984	Legmen	No Neck	Episode: "I Shall Be Re-Released"
1984	Hardcastle and McCormick	Jackson	Episode: "Scared Stiff"
1984	Going Bananas	Hank	
1984	Webster	Judge	Episode: "Webster Long"
1984	Fist of the North Star	Fang	Voice; English dub
1984	The Dukes of Hazzard	Charlie	Episode: "Cool Hands, Luke & Bo"
1984–1985	Brothers	Bubba Dean	2 episodes
1985	Street Hawk	Councilman Waters	Pilot
1985	St. Elsewhere	Mental Patient	Episode: "Give the Boy a Hand"
1985	Cagney & Lacey	Mr. Berwin	Episode: "Who Says It's Fair"
1985	Kicks	Stanley	Television film
1985	Space	Jean-Marie	CBS miniseries
1985	Scarecrow and Mrs. King	Nabuti	Episode: "Murder Between Friends"
1985	Hulk Hogan's Rock 'n' Wrestling	Junkyard Dog	Voice
1985	George Burns Comedy Week		Episode: "The Assignment"
1985	The A-Team	Quint	Episode: "The Heart of Rock n' Roll"
1985	Moonlighting	Reuben King	Episode: "Twas the Episode Before Christmas"
1986	Karate Kommandos	Additional voices	
1986	Amazing Stories	Chief Hansen	Episode: "Hell Toupee"
1986	Rambo and the Forces of Freedom	Turbo	Voice
1986	Samaritan: The Mitch Snyder Story	Hank Dudney	Television film
1986	Condor	Cas	Television film
1986	Sunday Drive	Oliver	Television film
1986–1989	The Real Ghostbusters	Killerwatt / Judge	Voice, 3 episodes
1986–1989	Amen	Arnie Samples / Rev. Crawford	5 episodes
1987	Jake's M.O.	Abel Barnes	Television film
1987	Timestalkers	Blacksmith	Television film
1987	Jake and the Fatman	Lieutenant	Episode: "Fatal Attraction"
1987–1989	Valerie	Judge N. Keller / Mr. Erdman	2 episodes
1987–1993	Teenage Mutant Ninja Turtles	Shredder	Voice, 103 episodes
1988	Dallas	Judge Fowler	Episode: "Malice in Dallas"
1988	Beauty and the Beast	Winslow	
1988	227	Jo-Jo	Episode: "My Aching Back"
1988	Heart and Soul	Harlan Sinclair	Pilot
1988–1992	L.A. Law	Judge Michael Conover	9 episodes
1989	Full Exposure: The Sex Tapes Scandal	Earl	Television film
1989	Roe vs. Wade		Television film
1989	FM	Quentin Lamoreaux	TV series
1989	A Different World	The Pin Punisher	Episode: "To Have and Have Not"
1989	Turn Back the Clock	Physical Therapist	Television film
1990	Night Court	Judge Hopkins	Episode: "Wedding Bell Blues"
1990	Capital News	Mr. Fairchild	Pilot
1990	To My Daughter	Ian Mellon	Television film
1990–1996	The Fresh Prince of Bel-Air	Philip Banks	Main role; 148 episodes
1991	Teenage Mutant Ninja Turtles	Shredder	Voice, television film
1991	The Legend of Prince Valiant	Sir Bryant	Voice, 9 episodes
1992	Roc	Dale Hammers	Episode: "The Car Accident from Heaven"
1993	Without Warning: Terror in the Towers	Fred Ferby	Television film
1993	Family Matters	Himself	Episode: "Scenes from a Mall"
1993–1994	American Experience	Charles Hamilton Houston / Narrator	2 episodes
1994	Hart to Hart: Old Friends Never Die	Chess Player	Television film
1994	A Friend to Die For	Agent Gilwood	Television film
1994	Aladdin	Haroud Hazi Bin	Voice, 11 episodes
1994–1995	Iron Man	Jim Rhodes / War Machine (ep. 1–5), Whirlwind (ep. 1–11), Blacklash (1994–1995)	Voice, 7 episodes
1995	ABC Weekend Special	Headman	Voice, episode: "Jirimpimbira – An African Folk Tale"
1995	Murder One	Judge Nathaniel Alexander	Episode: "Chapter Five"
1996	Gargoyles	The Shaman	Voice, episode: "Walkabout"
1996	Captain Simian & the Space Monkeys	Gor-illa/Gor	Voice, 26 episodes
1996	Spider-Man	War Machine	Voice, 2 episodes
1996–1998	Sparks	Alonzo Sparks	40 episodes
1996–1998	In the House	Mediator / Sampson Stanton	2 episodes
1997	Happily Ever After: Fairy Tales for Every Child	Father	Voice, episode: "The Golden Goose"
1997	Extreme Ghostbusters	Danny	Voice, episode: "Dry Spell"
1998	The Advanced Guard	Fred	Television film
1998	You Lucky Dog	Calvin Bridges	Television film
1998	The Wild Thornberrys	Gorilla	Voice, episode: "Valley Girls"
1999	Vengeance Unlimited	Judge Christopher Washington	Episode: "Legalese"
1999	King's Pawn	Cecil	Pilot
1999	Where on Earth Is Carmen Sandiego?	Malcolm Avalon	2 episodes
1999	For Your Love	Rev. Hicks	Episode: "Mother Load"
1999	Family Law		Episode: "Damages"
1999–2000	Pepper Ann	Mr. Clapper	3 episodes
2000	Bull	Prof. Gilbert Granville	Episode: "What the Past Will Bring"
2000	One World	William Richard	Episode: "Guess Who's Coming to Dinner"
2000	CSI: Crime Scene Investigation	Preston Cash	Episode: "Unfriendly Skies"
2000	Two Guys and a Girl	Judge	Episode: "Rescue Me"
2000–2002	Dharma & Greg	Walter	2 episodes
2001	Epoch	Dr. Solomon Holt	Television film
2001	The Jamie Foxx Show	Reverend	Episode: "Always and Forever"
2001	Strong Medicine	Harold Jenkins	Episode: "Wednesday Night Fever"
2001	The Legend of Tarzan	Chief Keewazi	Voice, 3 episodes
2001	The Proud Family	Crandall Smythe	Voice, episode: "Spelling Bee"
2001–2002	The Nightmare Room	R.L. Stine	12 episodes
2001–2003	Soul Food	Walter Carter	4 episodes
2002	Philly	Dean Mark Clivner	Episode: "Here Comes the Judge"
2002	Judging Amy	Mr. Ruff	Episode: "Damage Control"
2002	Nancy Drew	Prof. Shifflin	Television film
2002–2003	The Division	Charles Haysbert	9 episodes
2003	Reba	Judge Samuel Bennett	Episode: "The Feud"
2003	Crossing Jordan	Dr. Erkhart	Episode: "Conspiracy"
2003	Street Smarts	Contestant	Episode: "May 16, 2003"
2003	All About the Andersons	Roscoe	Episode: "Flo's Dream"
2003–2004	All of Us	Lucas	2 episodes
2004	That '70s Show	Officer Kennedy	3 episodes
2004	Charmed	Zola	Episode: "A Call to Arms"
2004	NYPD Blue	Steve Pines	Episode: "Great Balls or Ire"
2004	Girlfriends	Dr. Couch	Episode: "Maybe Baby"
2004	That's So Raven	Presto Jones	Episode: "Opportunity Shocks"
2005–2007	The Closer	Dr. Crippen	11 episodes
2005	My Wife and Kids	Prof. Floyd F. Tillman	Episode: "Study Buddy"
2005	Star Trek: Enterprise	General K'Vagh	2 episodes
2005	Living With Fran	Mr. Bryant	Episode: "Learning with Fran"
2006	Take 3	Judge Sanderson	Episode: "Study Buddy"
2008	Eli Stone	Mason Andrews	Episode: "Wake Me Up Before You Go-Go"
2009	Sherri	Redmond	4 episodes
2011	The Problem Solverz	Go-Seeki Ninja Master / Ninja Master Head	Voice, episode: "Hide and Seek Ninjaz"
2012	Grey's Anatomy	Sam	Episode: "One Step Too Far"
2012	The Young and the Restless	Judge Roy Daley	2 episodes
2013	Call Me Crazy: A Five Film	Dr. Beckett	Television film
2013	Hunt for the Labyrinth Killer	Judge Parsons	Television film
2013	Go, Bolivia, Go!	Commissioner Morocco	Television film
2015	Da Jammies	Covington	Voice, episode: "Cello"; Posthumous release

=== Video games/Other ===
Year	Title	Role	Notes
1992	Splash Mountain	Br'er Frog, Br'er Bear	Walt Disney World version only
1994	Disney's Animated Storybook: The Lion King	Narrator	
2006	Biker Mice from Mars	Cataclysm / Cat Commando	
2011	Kinect Disneyland Adventures	Br'er Bear	
