= Suffolk, Virginia =

- Independent city
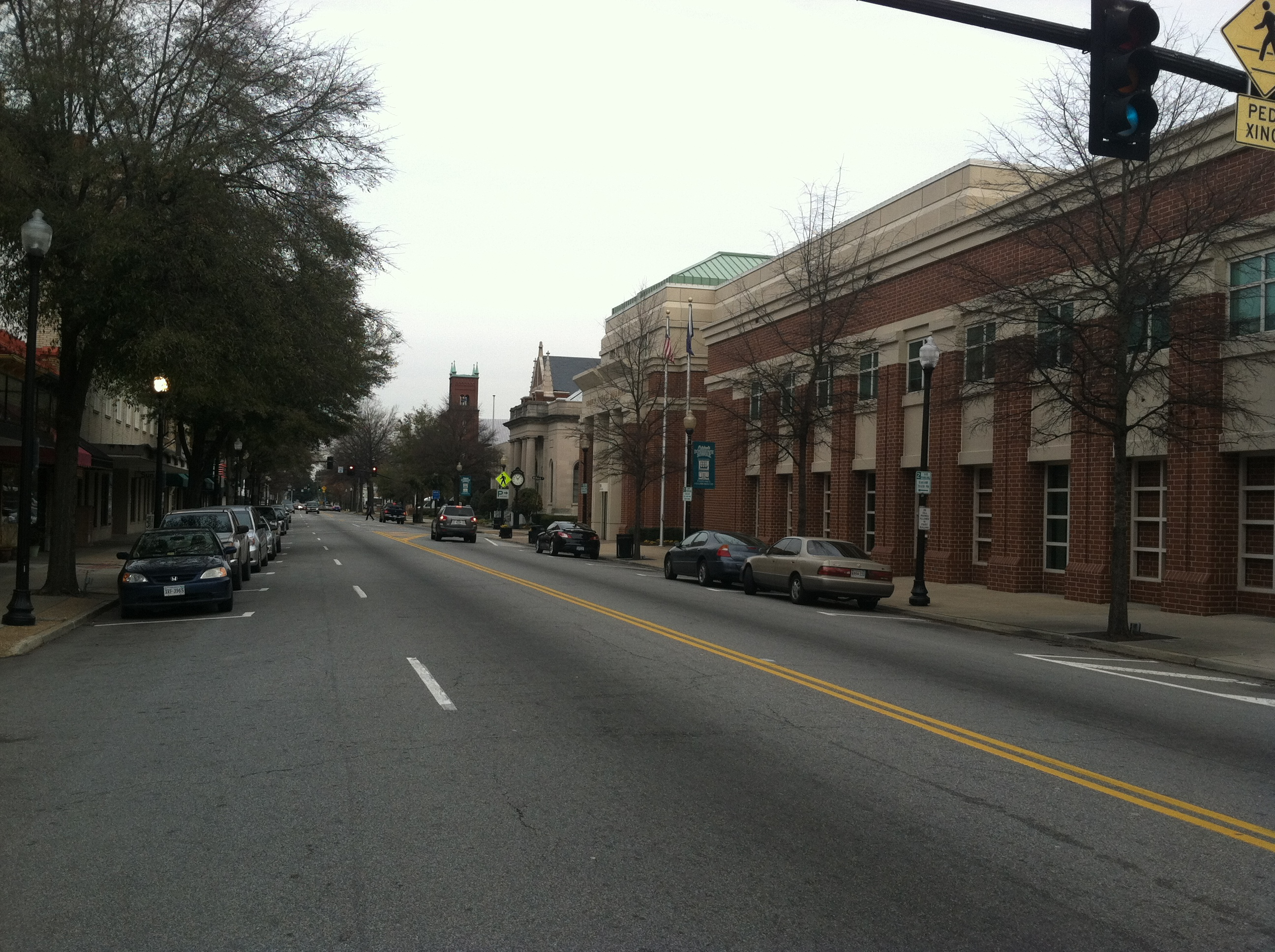
- A view of North Main Street in downtown Suffolk

- Seal
- Motto: "It's a good time to be in Suffolk"
- Interactive map of Suffolk, Virginia
- Location within Virginia Location within the United States
- Coordinates: 36°44′28″N 76°36′35″W
- Country: United States
- Founded: 1742

Government
  - Mayor: Michael D. Duman (Independent)

Area
  - Independent city: 428.91 sq mi (1,110.86 km^{2})
  - Land: 399.17 sq mi (1,033.85 km^{2})
  - Water: 29.74 sq mi (77.02 km^{2})
- Elevation: 39 ft (12 m)

Population (2020)
  - Independent city: 94,324
  - Estimate (2025): 104,699 ▲
  - Density: 236.30/sq mi (91.236/km^{2})
  - Metro: 1,799,674
- Time zone: UTC−5 (EST)
  - Summer (DST): UTC−4 (EDT)
- ZIP codes: 23432-23439
- Area codes: 757, 948
- FIPS code: 51-76432
- GNIS feature ID: 1500187
- Website: www.suffolkva.us

Suffolk (locally /ˈsʌfʊk/ SUF-uuk) is an independent city in Virginia, United States. As of 2020, the population was 94,324. It is the 10th-most populous city in Virginia, the largest city in Virginia by boundary land area as well as the 16th-largest in the country. Suffolk is located in the Hampton Roads metropolitan area. This also includes the independent cities of Chesapeake, Hampton, Newport News, Norfolk, Portsmouth, and Virginia Beach, and smaller cities, counties, and towns of Hampton Roads. With miles of waterfront property on the Nansemond and James rivers, present-day Suffolk was formed in 1974 after consolidating with Nansemond County and the towns of Holland and Whaleyville.

== History ==
Prior to colonization, the region was inhabited by the indigenous Nansemond people. The settlement of Suffolk was established in 1742 by Virginian colonists as a port town on the Nansemond River. It was originally named Constant's Warehouse (for John Constant, one of the first founders of the settlement) before being renamed after Royal Governor of Virginia Sir William Gooch's home county of the same name in England. During the colonial era, Virginian colonists in the region cultivated tobacco with enslaved labor as a cash crop, before transitioning to mixed farming. Suffolk was designated as the county seat of Nansemond County in 1750.

Early in its history, Suffolk became a land transportation gateway to the areas east of it in South Hampton Roads. Before the American Civil War, both the Portsmouth and Roanoke Railroad and the Norfolk and Petersburg Railroad were built through Suffolk, early predecessors of 21st-century Class 1 railroads operated by CSX Transportation and Norfolk Southern, respectively. Other railroads and later major highways followed after the war.

Suffolk became an incorporated town in 1808. Suffolk became a stop on the Atlantic and Danville Railway in 1890. In 1910, it incorporated as a city and separated from Nansemond County. However, it remained the seat of Nansemond County until 1972, when its former county became the independent city of Nansemond. In 1974, the independent cities of Suffolk and Nansemond merged under Suffolk's name and charter.

Peanuts grown in the surrounding areas became a major agricultural industry for Suffolk. Notably, Planters' Peanuts was established in Suffolk beginning in 1912. Suffolk was the 'birthplace' of Mr. Peanut, the mascot of Planters' Peanuts. For many years, the call-letters of local AM radio station WLPM stood for World's Largest Peanut Market. (WLPM's license was cancelled in 1996) In 1918, Suffolk did its part in the war effort when it became the home of the Nansemond Ordinance Depot. Formally named Pin Point under the Confederacy during the Civil War, the United States Government purchased the land and used it as a weapons depot until the site's closure in 1960.

== Geography ==
Suffolk is located at 36°44′29″N 76°36′36″W (36.741347, −76.609881).

According to the United States Census Bureau, the city has a total area of 428.9 square miles (1,111 km^{2}), of which 399.15 square miles (1,033.8 km^{2}) is land and 29.75 square miles (77.1 km^{2}) (6.9%) is water. It is the largest city in Virginia by land area and second largest by total area. Part of the Great Dismal Swamp is located in Suffolk.

== Demographics ==
Historical population
Census	Pop.	Note	%±
1860	1,395		—
1870	930		−33.3%
1880	1,963		111.1%
1890	3,354		70.9%
1900	3,827		14.1%
1910	7,008		83.1%
1920	9,123		30.2%
1930	10,271		12.6%
1940	11,343		10.4%
1950	12,339		8.8%
1960	12,609		2.2%
1970	9,858		−21.8%
1980	47,621		383.1%
1990	52,141		9.5%
2000	63,677		22.1%
2010	84,585		32.8%
2020	94,324		11.5%
2025 (est.)	104,699	▲	11.0%
U.S. Decennial Census; 1790-1960 1900-1990; 1990-2000 2010-2020

=== Racial and ethnic composition ===
Suffolk city, Virginia – Racial and ethnic composition Note: the US Census treats Hispanic/Latino as an ethnic category. This table excludes Latinos from the racial categories and assigns them to a separate category. Hispanics/Latinos may be of any race.
Race / Ethnicity (NH = Non-Hispanic)	Pop 1980	Pop 1990	Pop 2000	Pop 2010	Pop 2020	% 1980	% 1990	% 2000	% 2010	% 2020
White alone (NH)	24,618	28,367	33,940	43,034	43,837	51.70%	54.40%	53.30%	50.88%	46.47%
Black or African American alone (NH)	22,468	23,141	27,524	35,771	39,194	47.18%	44.38%	43.22%	42.29%	41.55%
Native American or Alaska Native alone (NH)	57	107	185	232	255	0.12%	0.21%	0.29%	0.27%	0.27%
Asian alone (NH)	109	186	487	1,324	1,672	0.23%	0.36%	0.76%	1.57%	1.77%
Native Hawaiian or Pacific Islander alone (NH)	x	x	15	50	68	x	x	0.02%	0.06%	0.07%
Other race alone (NH)	20	21	64	109	543	0.04%	0.04%	0.10%	0.13%	0.58%
Mixed race or Multiracial (NH)	x	x	653	1,650	4,503	x	x	1.03%	1.95%	4.77%
Hispanic or Latino (any race)	349	319	809	2,415	4,252	0.73%	0.61%	1.27%	2.86%	4.51%
Total	47,621	52,141	63,677	84,585	94,324	100.00%	100.00%	100.00%	100.00%	100.00%

=== 2020 census ===
As of the 2020 census, Suffolk had a population of 94,324. The median age was 39.2 years, with 23.7% of residents under the age of 18 and 15.6% aged 65 or older. For every 100 females there were 93.8 males, and for every 100 females age 18 and over there were 90.2 males age 18 and over.

72.9% of residents lived in urban areas, while 27.1% lived in rural areas.

There were 35,555 households in Suffolk, of which 33.5% had children under the age of 18 living in them. Of all households, 50.7% were married-couple households, 15.8% were households with a male householder and no spouse or partner present, and 28.0% were households with a female householder and no spouse or partner present. About 23.6% of all households were made up of individuals and 9.8% had someone living alone who was 65 years of age or older.

There were 38,364 housing units, of which 7.3% were vacant. The homeowner vacancy rate was 2.2% and the rental vacancy rate was 8.2%.

Racial composition as of the 2020 census
Race	Number	Percent
White	44,723	47.4%
Black or African American	39,701	42.1%
American Indian and Alaska Native	343	0.4%
Asian	1,708	1.8%
Native Hawaiian and Other Pacific Islander	74	0.1%
Some other race	1,645	1.7%
Two or more races	6,130	6.5%
Hispanic or Latino (of any race)	4,252	4.5%

=== 2010 Census ===
Age distribution in Suffolk.

As of the census of 2010, there were 84,585 people, 23,283 households, and 17,718 families residing in the city. The population density was 159.2 inhabitants per square mile (61.5/km^{2}). There were 24,704 housing units at an average density of 61.8 per square mile (23.9/km^{2}). The racial makeup of the city was 50.1% White, 42.7% Black or African American, 0.3% Native American, 1.6% Asian, 0.1% Pacific Islander, 0.8% from other races, and 2.3% from two or more races. Hispanics or Latinos of any race were 2.9% of the population.

There were 23,283 households, out of which 36.6% had children under the age of 18 living with them, 55.1% were married couples living together, 16.8% had a female householder with no husband present, and 23.9% were non-families. 20.2% of all households were made up of individuals, and 8.1% had someone living alone who was 65 years of age or older. The average household size was 2.69 and the average family size was 3.09.

The age distribution was 27.8% under the age of 18, 7.1% from 18 to 24, 31.1% from 25 to 44, 22.5% from 45 to 64, and 11.4% who were 65 years of age or older. The median age was 36 years. For every 100 females, there were 91.4 males. For every 100 females aged 18 and over, there were 87.4 males.

The median income for a household in the city was $41,115, and the median income for a family was $47,342. Males had a median income of $35,852 versus $23,777 for females. The per capita income for the city was $18,836. About 10.8% of families and 13.2% of the population were below the poverty line, including 18.2% of those under age 18 and 11.2% of those age 65 or over.

As of 2005, the city's median income jumped to $60,484. A number of government-related, contractor high-tech jobs had developed with new businesses in the city's northern corridor, bringing in wealthier residents. Suffolk ranked a close second in median income to its neighbor Chesapeake in South Hampton Roads.

== Education ==
Suffolk Public Schools, the local public school system, operates 12 elementary schools, four middle schools, three high schools, and one alternative school. Nansemond-Suffolk Academy is a private college preparatory school located on Pruden Blvd.

Paul D. Camp Community College has a campus in Suffolk.

== Transportation ==
Suffolk's early growth depended on its waterfront location, with access to the waterways for power and transportation. Subsequent transportation infrastructure upgraded its connections with other markets. These continue to be major factors in the 21st century.

=== Bike trails ===
The Dismal Swamp National Wildlife Refuge includes dozens of miles of trails accessible via White Marsh Road at Washington Ditch and other entry sites. Additional bike trails can be found at Lone Star Lakes City Park off Godwin Blvd. This city park provides over 4 miles (6.4 km) of rock trails. There are many rural roads with light traffic available for road riding. Adjacent to Suffolk is Isle of Wight County, where a county facility called Nike Park includes a bike trail approximately 2 1/2 miles in a loop.

=== Waterways ===
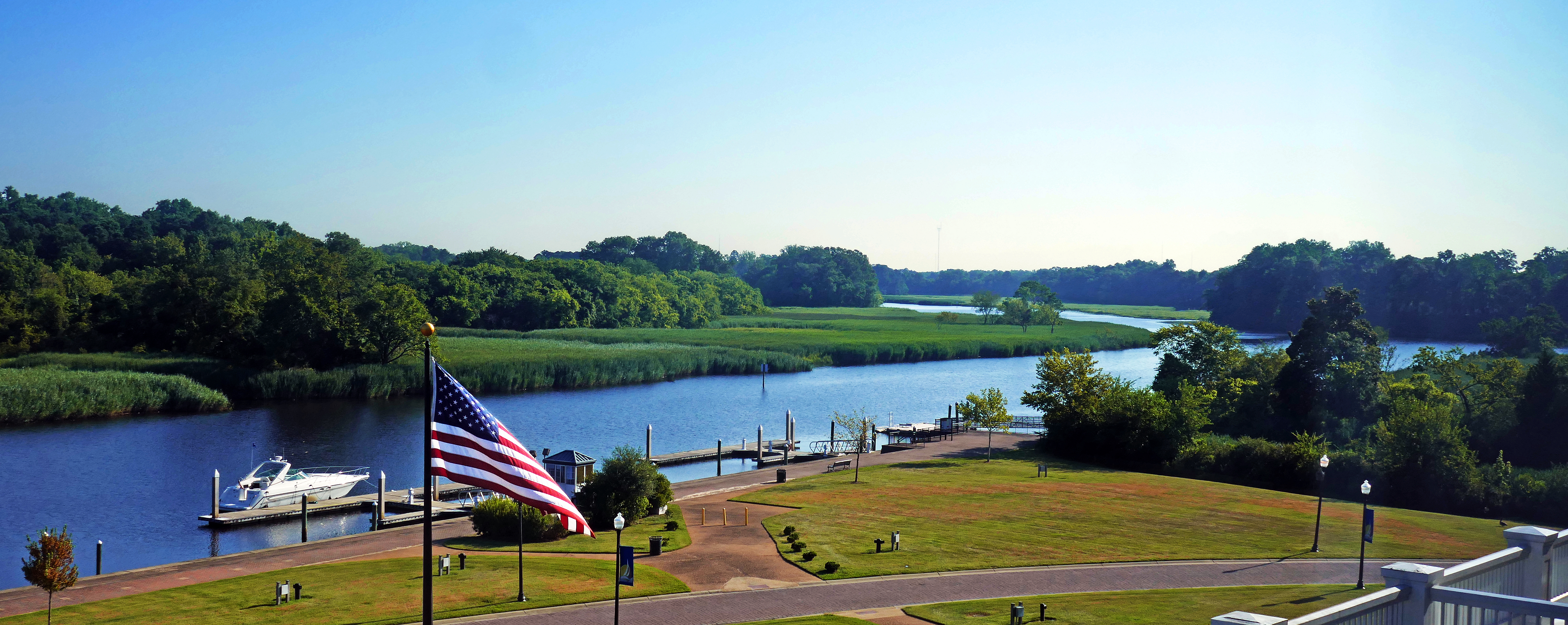
The Nansemond River is a major waterway in the city of Suffolk, Virginia.

Suffolk was initially a port at the head of navigation of the Nansemond River. The Nansemond flows into the James River near its mouth and the ice-free harbor of Hampton Roads.

=== Railroads ===
The two railroads completed through Suffolk before the American Civil War were later joined by four more. These were eventually consolidated during the modern merger era of North American railroads which began around 1960. Suffolk was served by several passenger lines, concluding with Amtrak's Mountaineer, which ended in 1977. At least two former passenger stations are still standing, the Seaboard Coast Line station, now the Seaboard Station Railroad Museum, and the Norfolk and Western Railway station at 100 Hollady Street. The N&W station was used by Amtrak (as "Holiday Street") until 1977 when the Mountaineer was replaced by a bus connection to the Hilltopper. Currently, Amtrak's Northeast Regional between Norfolk and Petersburg passes by the N&W station without stopping.

Today, Suffolk is served by three freight railroads. It is located on a potential branch line for the Southeast High Speed Rail Corridor between Petersburg, Virginia and South Hampton Roads, being studied by the Virginia Department of Rail and Public Transportation.

=== Highways ===
Suffolk is served by U.S. Highways 13, 17, 58, 258 and 460. Interstate 664, part of the Hampton Roads Beltway, crosses through the northeastern edge of the city. State Route 10 is also a major highway in the area.

In 2006, Suffolk assumed control of its road system from the Virginia Department of Transportation, which is customary among Virginia's independent cities. Since the Byrd Road Act of 1932 created Virginia's Secondary Roads System, the state maintains the roads in most counties and towns. An exception was made by the General Assembly when the former Nansemond County became an independent city and consolidated Suffolk in the 1970s. The state maintained the primary and secondary routes in Suffolk until July 1, 2006.

=== Bridges, bridge-tunnel ===
The Monitor–Merrimac Memorial Bridge–Tunnel connects Suffolk to the independent city of Newport News on the Virginia Peninsula from South Hampton Roads. It is part of the Hampton Roads Beltway, a circumferential interstate highway that links the seven largest cities of Hampton Roads. Completed in 1992, it provided a third major vehicle crossing of the Hampton Roads harbor area and cost $400 million to build.

The city and VDOT have had disputes over ownership and responsibility for the Kings Highway Bridge (circa 1928) across the Nansemond River on State Route 125. VDOT closed it in 2005 for safety reasons.

About 3,300 motorists a day used the bridge that connected Chuckatuck and Driver. The closure forced detours of as much as 19 miles (31 km). The cost of a new bridge for the King's Highway crossing is estimated at $48 million, far more than could be recovered through collection of tolls at that location. In 2007, VDOT announced that it would contract for demolition and removal of the bridge. According to newspaper accounts, this was the first time in VDOT's history that it did not plan for a replacement facility.

Virginia is reviewing proposals under a public-private partnership for a major realignment and upgrade of U.S. 460 from Suffolk west to Interstate 295 near Petersburg. In 1995, the Virginia General Assembly passed the Public-Private Transportation Act, allowing private entities to propose innovative solutions for designing, constructing, financing, and operating transportation improvements. The new roadway would be funded through collection of tolls.

As part of the Suffolk 2026 Comprehensive Plan, the city plans to bypass the crossroads community of Whaleyville in southwestern Suffolk City. US 13 (along with NC Highway 11) is a strategic highway corridor in North Carolina toward Greenville.

=== Public transportation ===
The City of Suffolk operates Suffolk Transit, which provides local bus service. Two connections to Hampton Roads Transit buses are also available.

== Economy ==
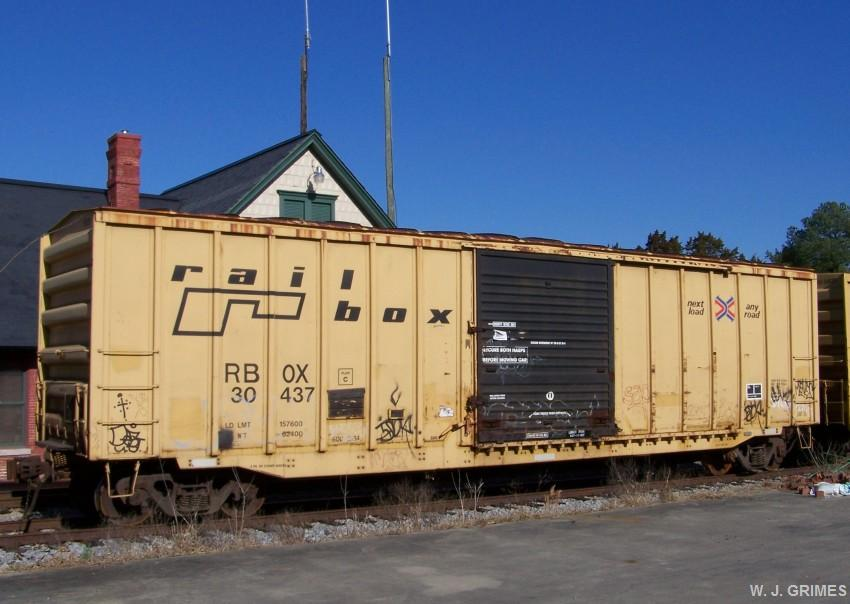
A RailBox boxcar exporting peanuts.

In modern times, Suffolk remains a major peanut processing center and railroad and highway transportation hub. It hosts a diverse combination of industrial, manufacturing, distribution, retail, and hospitality businesses, as well as active farming.

In 2002, the new Louise Obici Memorial Hospital was completed and dedicated. It was acquired in 2005 by the Sentara Health System. Planters' Peanuts has been a major employer, now owned by Kraft Foods. Each fall since 1977, the City of Suffolk hosts Suffolk Festivals Incorporated's annual Peanut Fest.

Other large employers in the City of Suffolk include Unilever, Lipton Tea, Massimo Zanetti Beverage Group, Wal-Mart, Target, QVC, and two major modeling and simulation companies, Lockheed Martin and Raytheon. Lockheed Martin built its "Center for Innovation" around a lighthouse in Suffolk, for which the campus is called 'The Lighthouse'. Raytheon won a DoD contract to manufacture 'Miniature Air-Launched Decoy Jammers'(MALD-J), which it has been producing with Cobham Composite Products: 202 vehicles for a price of $81 million.

The U.S. Joint Forces Command (JFCOM) facility, near the intersection of US 17 and Interstate 664, has resulted in a growth in defense contracting and high-tech jobs since 1999. Through the following decade, JFCOM employed a growing number of defense contractors until it reached over 3,000. By September 2010, US Secretary of Defense Robert Gates recommended to decommission JFCOM, as a matter of reallocating and rebalancing the U.S. Department of Defense budget, to better address changing needs and fiscal demands.

The announcement led to speculation about the effects the loss of JFCOM would have on the Hampton Roads economy in general and (more specifically), on the future of related businesses located in the Harborview section of Suffolk. In August 2011 JFCOM was disestablished. But many critical JFCOM functions, such as joint training, joint exercises, and joint development were retained in the buildings vacated by JFCOM, under the auspices of the Joint Staff J7 Directorate, referred to as either "Pentagon South" or "Joint and Coalition Warfighting".

By summer 2013, city officials expected the Naval Network Warfare Command, NNWC Global Network Operations Center Detachment, Navy Cyber Defense Operations Command and Navy Cyber Forces to occupy buildings vacated by JFCOM. These commands have been considered a boon to north Suffolk, bringing an estimated 1,000 additional employees, counting military, civilians and contractors, with an estimated annual payroll of $88.9 million. The buildup in these defense functions resulted in Suffolk's median income increasing markedly in this period.

== Media ==
Suffolk's daily newspapers are the local Suffolk News-Herald, the Virginian-Pilot from Norfolk and the Daily Press of Newport News. Other papers include the New Journal and Guide, and Inside Business. Coastal Virginia Magazine serves as a bi-monthly regional magazine for Suffolk and the Hampton Roads area. Hampton Roads Times serves as an online magazine for all the Hampton Roads cities and counties. Suffolk is served by a variety of radio stations on the AM and FM dials, with towers located around the Hampton Roads area.

Suffolk is also served by several television stations. The Hampton Roads designated market area (DMA) is the 42nd largest in the U.S. with 712,790 homes (0.64% of the total U.S.). The major network television affiliates are WTKR-TV 3 (CBS), WAVY 10 (NBC), WVEC-TV 13 (ABC), WGNT 27 (CW), WTVZ 33 (MyNetworkTV), WVBT 43 (FOX), and WPXV 49 (ION Television). The Public Broadcasting Service station is WHRO-TV 15. Suffolk residents also can receive independent stations, such as WSKY broadcasting on channel 4 from the Outer Banks of North Carolina and WGBS-LD broadcasting on channel 11 from Hampton. Suffolk is served by Charter Communications. The City of Suffolk Media & Community Relations Department operates Municipal Channel 8 on the local Charter Cable television system. Programming includes television coverage of many City activities and events, including live Government-access television (GATV) broadcasts of all regular City Council meetings, and special features including "On The Scene", "Suffolk Seniorcize", and "Suffolk Business Today". DirecTV and Dish Network are also popular as an alternative to cable television in Suffolk.

== Boroughs ==
Suffolk is divided politically into seven boroughs, one corresponding to the former city of Suffolk and one corresponding to each of the six magisterial districts of the former Nansemond County. The boroughs are Chuckatuck, Cypress, Holy Neck, Nansemond, Sleepy Hole, Suffolk, and Whaleyville.

== Sister cities ==
In 1981, the county of Suffolk in England became Suffolk's first sister city as a result of the personal interest in the Sister Cities concept by Virginia's Governor, Mills E. Godwin. A native of the city, Governor Godwin believed that Sister Cities would benefit the community culturally and educationally. Suffolk's second sister city relationship with Oderzo, Italy, began in 1995 because of one man, Amedeo Obici. Mr. Obici was a native of Oderzo and the founder of Planters Nut and Chocolate Company in Suffolk.

Suffolk Sister Cities International, Inc. (SSCI) is a 501 (c)(3) nonprofit established to promote international relationships as directed by Suffolk City Council through its appointed Suffolk Sister Cities Commission. Its membership is open to all who are interested in fostering the goals of the organization.

SSCI and its international youth association, SIYA, have won national awards for Youth and Education and for the Best Overall Program for cities with populations less than 100,000.

== Notable people ==
- James Avery (1945–2013), actor who portrayed Uncle Phil on The Fresh Prince of Bel-Air was from Pughsville, Virginia, much of which is now located in Suffolk
- Johnnie Barnes, former NFL player
- Darius Bea, Negro league outfielder and pitcher
- Jessie Britt, former NFL player
- Rose Marie Brown (1919-2015), Broadway performer, Miss Virginia and fourth runner-up Miss America 1939
- Charlie Byrd, guitarist
- Judith Godwin, abstract expressionist artist
- Mills E. Godwin Jr., Virginia governor
- Phyllis Gordon (1889-1964), actress, born in Suffolk
- Ryan Speedo Green, bass-baritone opera singer
- D. Arthur Kelsey, Justice of the Supreme Court of Virginia
- Joe Kenda, retired homicide detective
- Lex Luger, musician
- Joe Maphis, country music guitarist
- Jeff W. Mathis III, U.S. Army major general
- Amedeo Obici, founder of Planters' Peanuts
- Lewis F. Powell Jr. (1907-1998), US Supreme Court Justice 1972-1987
- Sugar Rodgers, (WNBA) Basketball player for the Las Vegas Aces
- M. Virginia Rosenbaum, surveyor and newspaper editor
- Hope Spivey, gymnast, participated in 1988 Olympics in Seoul
- Deatrich Wise Jr., football player for New England Patriots

== Attractions ==
Suffolk's boundaries include many rural areas and towns, as well central Suffolk itself. For historic districts throughout Suffolk, see National Register of Historic Places listings in Suffolk, Virginia.

- Driver Historic District
- Great Dismal Swamp
- Nansemond County Training School
- Phoenix Bank of Nansemond
- Riddick's Folly
- St. John's Church, Chuckatuck
- Suffolk Center for Cultural Arts
- Suffolk Historic District
- The Seaboard Station Railroad Museum, located at 326 North Main Street, is housed in a historic Seaboard Coast Line station. The museum features a model train layout depicting Suffolk, and railroad memorabilia. Admission is free, with donations accepted, and open year-round. A few blocks away from the railroad museum is the former Norfolk and Western Railway and Amtrak station at 100 Holladay Street.
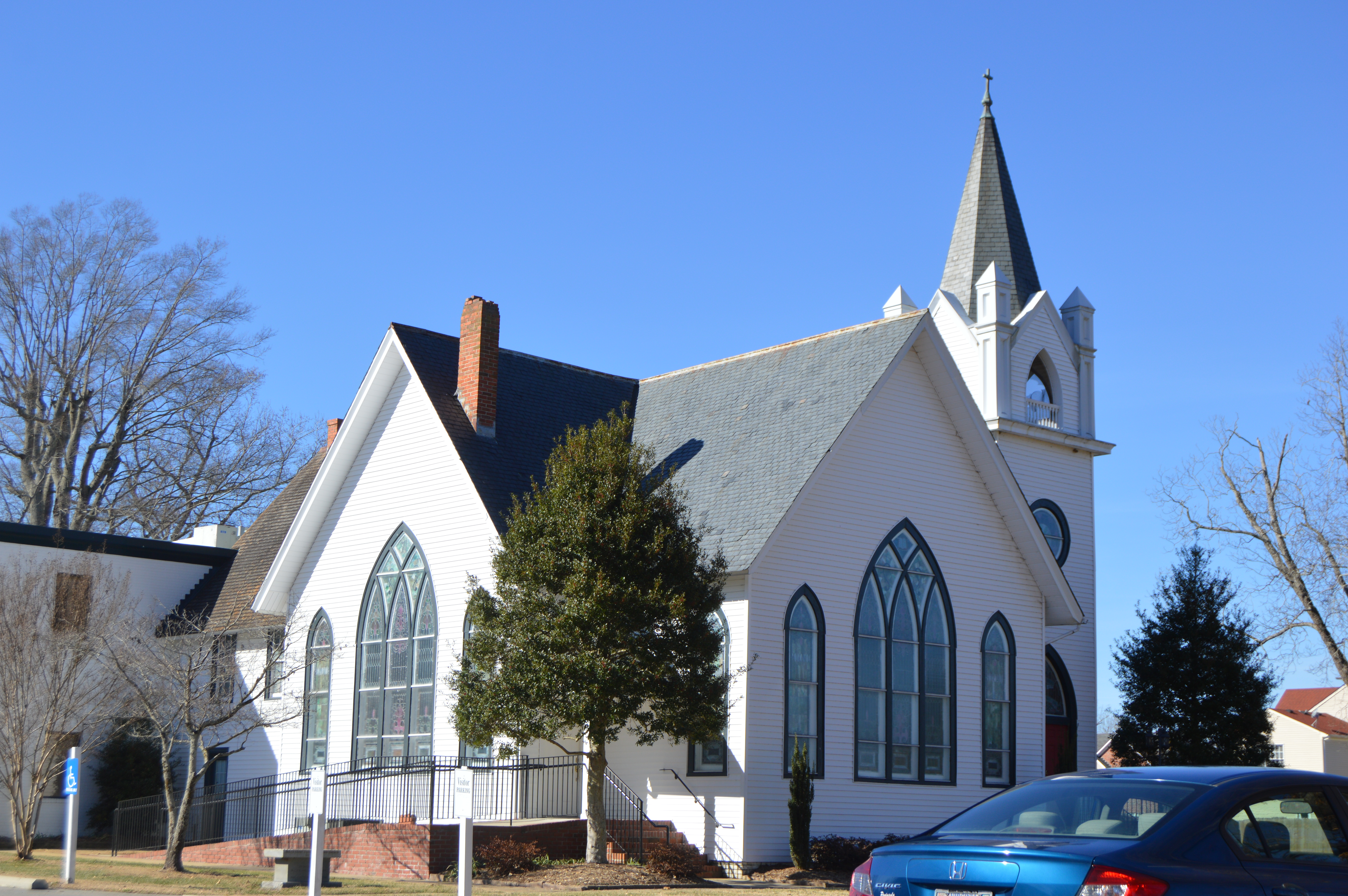
Driver Historic District

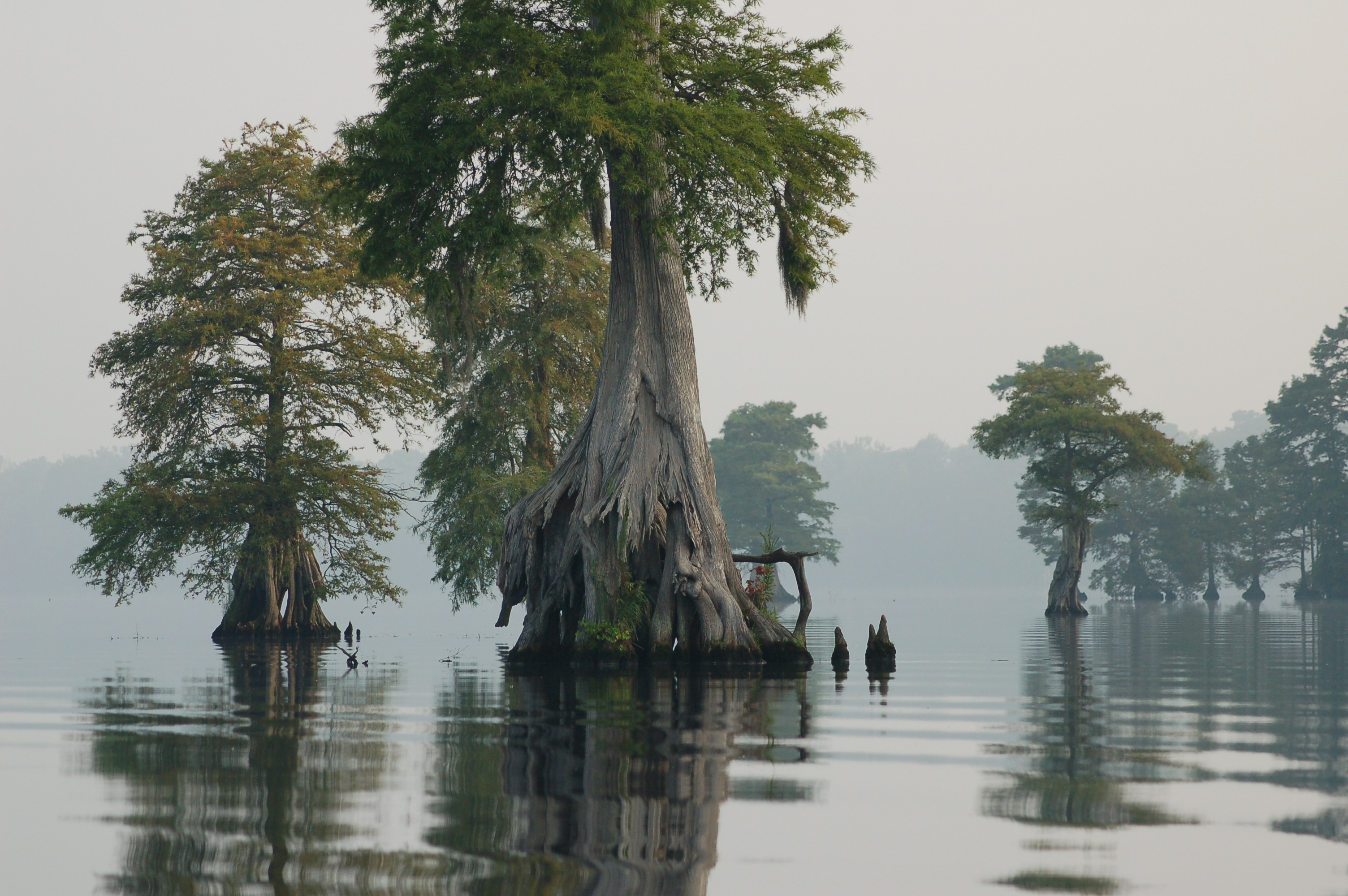
Great Dismal Swamp

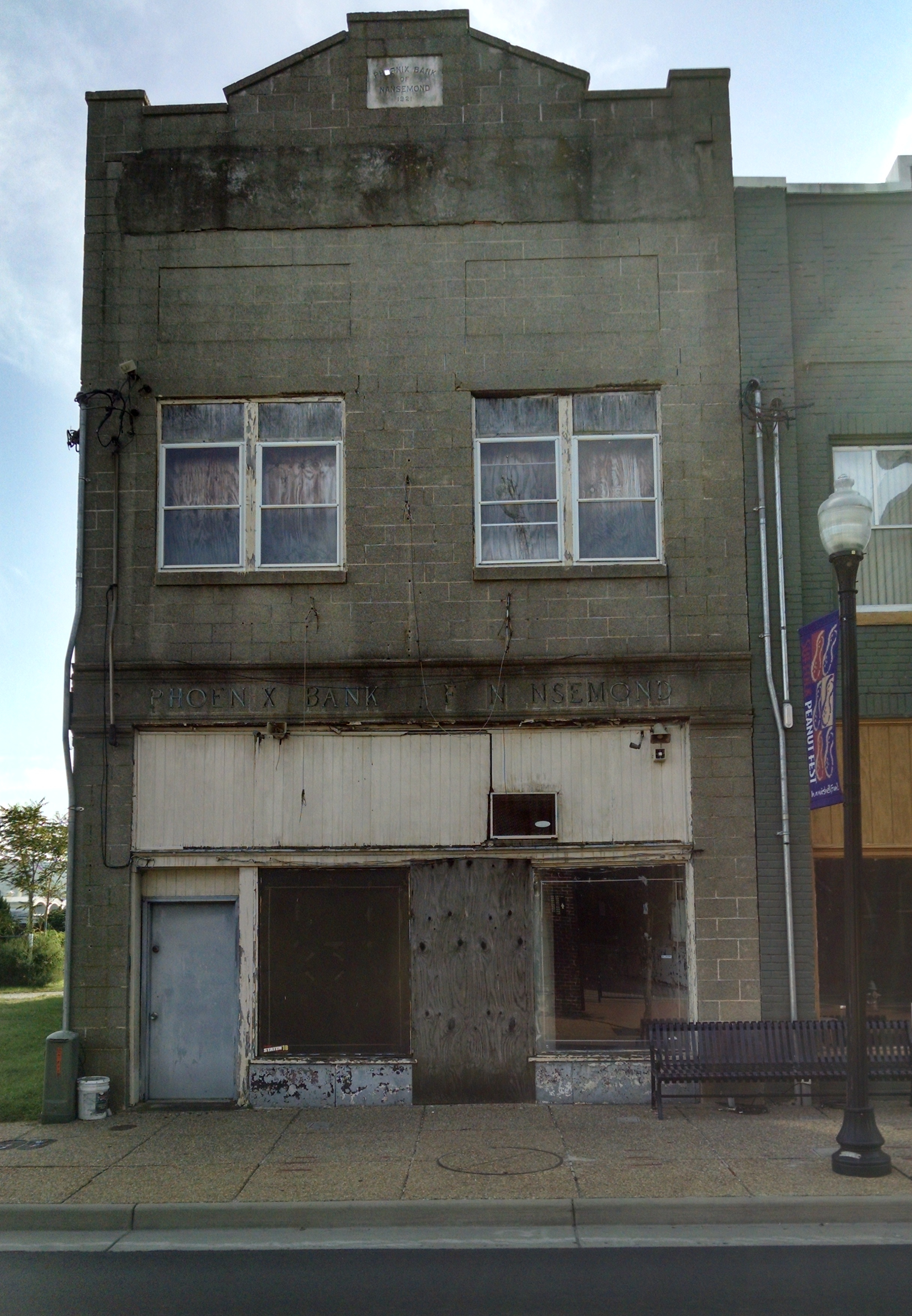
Phoenix Bank of Nansemond

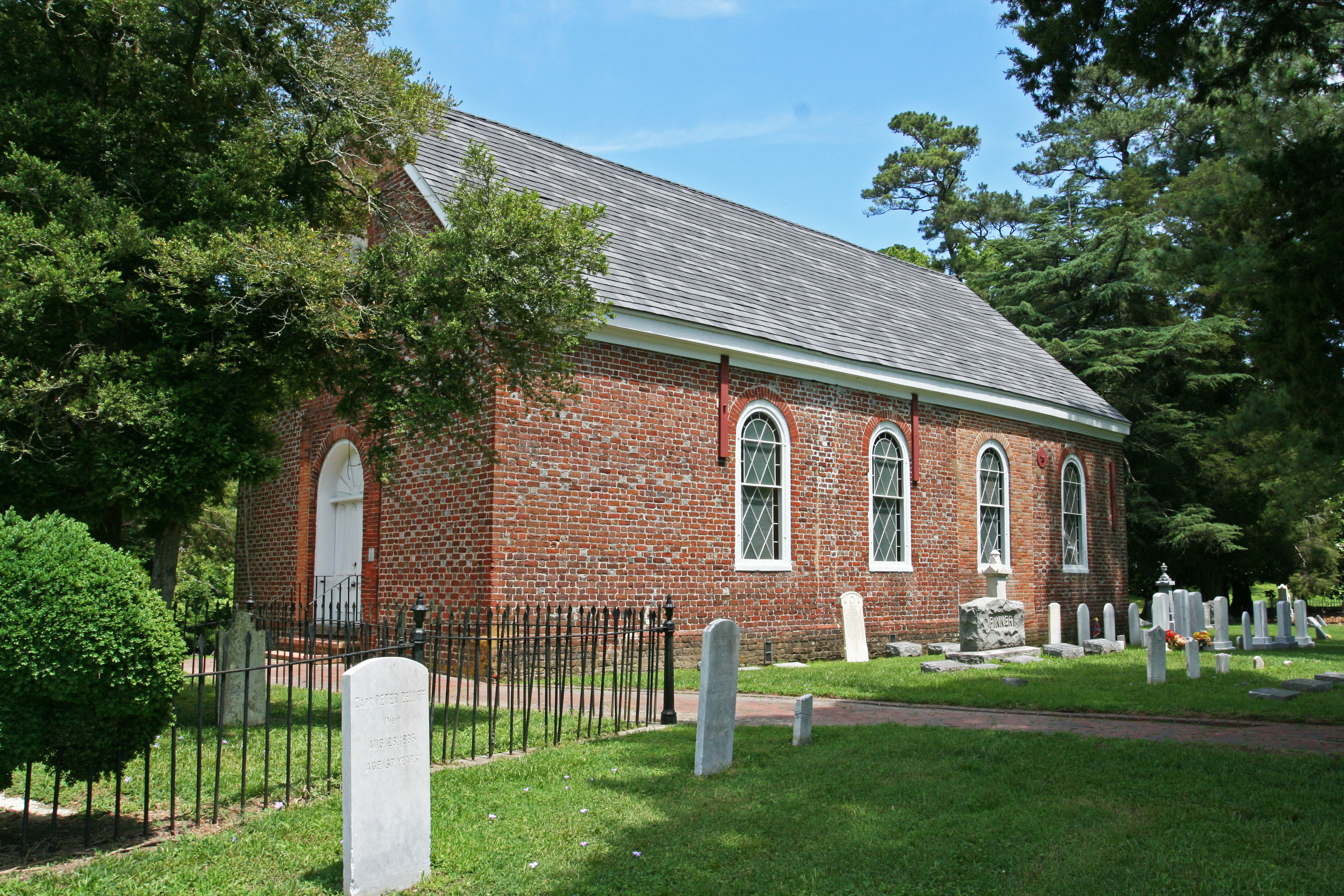
St. John's Chuckatuck

== Climate ==
The climate in this area is characterized by hot, humid summers and generally mild to cool winters. According to the Köppen Climate Classification system, Suffolk has a humid subtropical climate, abbreviated "Cfa" on climate maps.

Climate data for Suffolk, Virginia (1991–2020 normals, extremes 1945–present)
Month	Jan	Feb	Mar	Apr	May	Jun	Jul	Aug	Sep	Oct	Nov	Dec	Year
Record high °F (°C)	79 (26)	81 (27)	88 (31)	94 (34)	98 (37)	105 (41)	103 (39)	103 (39)	101 (38)	98 (37)	85 (29)	80 (27)	105 (41)
Mean daily maximum °F (°C)	49.3 (9.6)	52.4 (11.3)	59.4 (15.2)	69.2 (20.7)	76.1 (24.5)	83.4 (28.6)	86.8 (30.4)	85.1 (29.5)	79.6 (26.4)	70.5 (21.4)	60.5 (15.8)	52.7 (11.5)	68.8 (20.4)
Daily mean °F (°C)	40.2 (4.6)	42.7 (5.9)	49.1 (9.5)	58.6 (14.8)	66.4 (19.1)	74.2 (23.4)	78.3 (25.7)	76.8 (24.9)	71.3 (21.8)	61.0 (16.1)	50.6 (10.3)	43.7 (6.5)	59.4 (15.2)
Mean daily minimum °F (°C)	31.1 (−0.5)	32.9 (0.5)	38.9 (3.8)	48.0 (8.9)	56.7 (13.7)	65.1 (18.4)	69.7 (20.9)	68.6 (20.3)	63.0 (17.2)	51.5 (10.8)	40.8 (4.9)	34.8 (1.6)	50.1 (10.1)
Record low °F (°C)	−5 (−21)	4 (−16)	14 (−10)	24 (−4)	30 (−1)	40 (4)	49 (9)	46 (8)	39 (4)	23 (−5)	18 (−8)	4 (−16)	−5 (−21)
Average precipitation inches (mm)	3.66 (93)	2.96 (75)	4.07 (103)	3.62 (92)	3.95 (100)	4.70 (119)	5.69 (145)	5.77 (147)	5.80 (147)	4.26 (108)	3.65 (93)	3.69 (94)	51.82 (1,316)
Average snowfall inches (cm)	3.1 (7.9)	1.5 (3.8)	0.3 (0.76)	0.0 (0.0)	0.0 (0.0)	0.0 (0.0)	0.0 (0.0)	0.0 (0.0)	0.0 (0.0)	0.0 (0.0)	0.0 (0.0)	0.9 (2.3)	5.8 (15)
Average precipitation days (≥ 0.01 in)	10.7	9.5	11.2	10.3	11.1	11.2	11.6	10.9	9.5	8.2	9.1	10.4	123.7
Average snowy days (≥ 0.1 in)	1.2	0.7	0.3	0.0	0.0	0.0	0.0	0.0	0.0	0.0	0.0	0.4	2.6
Source: NOAA

== Politics ==
Throughout most of the early 20th century, Suffolk was a Democratic stronghold, similar to the rest of the South at the time. As it grew rapidly throughout the century due to the defense and logistics industries, it became more of a swing city and a bellwether, voting for the national winner every time between 1952 and 2012 (with the exception of 1952 and 2000). Since then, Suffolk has followed the trend of more urbanized areas in Virginia and become a reliable Democratic stronghold, although Republicans still consistently achieve 40%, much better than many other independent cities in Virginia, something that can be attributed to Suffolk's consolidation with more rural areas of Nansemond County in 1974. Today, the more rural boroughs of Whaleyville, Holy Neck, and Chuckatuck lean Republican, while the more urban boroughs of Nansemond, Suffolk, Sleepy Hole, and Cypress lean Democratic.

United States presidential election results for Suffolk, Virginia
Year	Republican		Democratic		Third party(ies)	
Year	No.	%	No.	%	No.	%
1912	71	11.22%	480	75.83%	82	12.95%
1916	158	26.16%	437	72.35%	9	1.49%
1920	302	28.12%	761	70.86%	11	1.02%
1924	179	23.55%	557	73.29%	24	3.16%
1928	573	47.36%	637	52.64%	0	0.00%
1932	265	20.59%	1,013	78.71%	9	0.70%
1936	281	17.12%	1,360	82.88%	0	0.00%
1940	383	23.97%	1,215	76.03%	0	0.00%
1944	569	29.73%	1,342	70.11%	3	0.16%
1948	741	35.80%	1,030	49.76%	299	14.44%
1952	1,622	57.17%	1,209	42.62%	6	0.21%
1956	1,617	57.50%	1,103	39.22%	92	3.27%
1960	1,406	49.61%	1,419	50.07%	9	0.32%
1964	1,463	48.06%	1,579	51.87%	2	0.07%
1968	1,277	37.95%	1,044	31.03%	1,044	31.03%
1972	2,137	69.54%	898	29.22%	38	1.24%
1976	6,066	38.86%	9,246	59.24%	297	1.90%
1980	7,179	42.82%	9,064	54.07%	522	3.11%
1984	10,128	52.97%	8,842	46.25%	149	0.78%
1988	9,742	54.27%	8,080	45.01%	128	0.71%
1992	8,697	43.01%	9,196	45.47%	2,330	11.52%
1996	8,572	41.30%	10,827	52.17%	1,355	6.53%
2000	11,836	47.99%	12,471	50.57%	354	1.44%
2004	16,763	52.08%	15,233	47.32%	193	0.60%
2008	17,165	43.01%	22,446	56.24%	297	0.74%
2012	17,820	41.86%	24,267	57.01%	479	1.13%
2016	18,006	41.64%	23,280	53.84%	1,954	4.52%
2020	20,082	40.45%	28,676	57.77%	884	1.78%
2024	22,112	41.30%	30,597	57.14%	836	1.56%

Suffolk City Council Members
Borough	Incumbent	Title
At Large	Michael D. Duman	Mayor
Cypress	Leroy Bennett	Council Member
Chuckatuck	Shelley Butler Barlow	Council Member
Nansemond	Lue R. Ward Jr.	Vice Mayor
Sleepy Hole	Roger W. Fawcett	Council Member
Holy Neck	Timothy J. Johnson	Council Member
Suffolk	John Rector	Council Member
Whaleyville	LeOtis Williams	Council Member

Suffolk City School Board Members
Borough	Incumbent	Title
Cypress	Karen Jenkins	School Board Member
Chuckatuck	Kimberly A. Slingluff	School Board Member
Nansemond	Dr. Judith Brooks-Buck	School Board Member
Sleepy Hole	Heather S. Howell	Vice Chair
Holy Neck	Dr. DawnMarie Brittingham	School Board Member
Suffolk	Tyron Riddick	Chairman
Whaleyville	Phyllis C. Byrum	School Board Member

City of Suffolk Constitutional Officers
Title	Incumbent
Clerk of the Circuit Court	W. Randolph Carter Jr.
Commonwealth Attorney	C. Phillips Ferguson
Commissioner of the Revenue	Susan L. Draper
Sheriff	Everett "E.C." Harris
City Treasurer	Ronald H. Williams

City of Suffolk State Elected Officials
Incumbent	Legislative Body	District	Party
Clint Jenkins	House of Delegates	76th	Democrat
Emily M. Brewer	House of Delegates	64th	Republican
C.E. "Cliff" Hayes Jr.	House of Delegates	77th	Democrat
Don Scott	House of Delegates	80th	Democrat
John Cosgrove	Senate	14th	Republican
Thomas K. "Tommy" Norment	Senate	3rd	Republican
T. Montgomery "Monty" Mason	Senate	1st	Democrat
L. Louise Lucas	Senate	18th	Democrat
Jen Kiggans	House of Representatives	2nd	Republican

== See also ==
- List of people from Hampton Roads, Virginia.
- National Register of Historic Places listings in Suffolk, Virginia
