= Pughsville, Virginia =

Community in Virginia

Pughsville
- Unincorporated community and neighborhood
- Location within Virginia
- Coordinates: 36°50′53″N 76°26′36″W
- Country: United States
- State: Virginia
- Independent city: Suffolk
- Former county: Nansemond
- Elevation: 20 ft (6 m)
- Time zone: UTC−5 (EST)
  - Summer (DST): UTC−4 (EDT)
- ZIP Code: 23435
- Area codes: 757, 948

Pughsville is a community in Virginia. It was part of Nansemond County, Virginia which ceased to exist when it was merged into Suffolk, Virginia in the 1970s. The Pughsville community is now in the northern part of Suffolk, Virginia along the border with Chesapeake, Virginia.

Pughsville is served by Nansemond River High School. It is located in the area of Suffolk, Virginia and Chesapeake, Virginia. It is a woodsy area where African-Americans settled. The origins of the name are unclear. A road through the area, Pughsville Road / SR 659, shares the Pughsville name along with Old Pughsville Road which runs into Chesapeake.

Pughsville Park has a playground and looping trail. Pughsville is home to the New Hope Baptist Church.

A 1949 report from a union meeting in Atlantic City, New Jersey lists a Veneer Box and Barrel Workers Union in Pughsville.

The area has been served by rail lines.

Drainage issues have been a problem in the area.

Actor James Avery, known for his roles as Uncle Phil in The Fresh Prince of Bel-Air and Shredder in Teenage Mutant Ninja Turtles, was born in Pughsville.
