= National Register of Historic Places listings in Suffolk, Virginia =

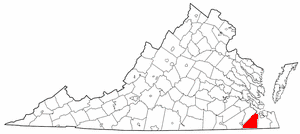
Location of Suffolk in Virginia

This is a list of the National Register of Historic Places listings in Suffolk, Virginia.

This is intended to be a complete list of the properties and districts on the National Register of Historic Places in the independent city of Suffolk, Virginia, United States. The locations of National Register properties and districts for which the latitude and longitude coordinates are included below, may be seen in an online map.

There are 27 properties and districts listed on the National Register in the city.

This National Park Service list is complete through NPS recent listings posted July 10, 2026.

== Current listings ==
	Name on the Register	Image	Date listed	Location	Description
1	Ames-Old Farm		July 16, 2026 (#100013213)	6700 Knotts Neck Road; 36°52′51″N 76°27′37″W	
2	Bay Point Farm	Bay Point Farm	June 23, 2003 (#03000571)	1400 Sleepy Hole Rd. 36°50′38″N 76°31′03″W	
3	Building at 216 Bank Street	Building at 216 Bank Street	November 7, 1985 (#85002765)	216 Bank St. 36°43′45″N 76°34′47″W	
4	Cedar Hill Cemetery	Cedar Hill Cemetery	February 1, 2006 (#05001584)	South of E. Constance Rd. 36°44′15″N 76°34′47″W	
5	Chuckatuck Historic District	Chuckatuck Historic District	April 7, 1995 (#95000393)	Junction of State Routes 10/32 with State Route 125; 36°51′40″N 76°34′45″W	Current settlement dates from 1635 land grant to Richard Bartlett, who built a grist mill at the head of Chuckatuck Creek that operated until 1970. Quaker leader George Fox founded Chuckatuck Meeting in 1672.
6	Driver Historic District	Driver Historic District	April 7, 1995 (#95000394)	Junction of State Route 125 and Driver Lane; 36°49′23″N 76°30′13″W	
7	Dumpling Island Archeological Site	Dumpling Island Archeological Site	February 10, 1998 (#98000046)	Eastern side of the Nansemond River; 36°48′36″N 76°33′18″W	
8	East Suffolk Complex	East Suffolk Complex	August 4, 2003 (#03000743)	231 S. 7th St. 36°43′30″N 76°33′52″W	
9	Samuel Eley House	Samuel Eley House	August 9, 2019 (#100004261)	4801 Pruden Boulevard; 36°47′21″N 76°39′36″W	
10	Freeman House	Freeman House	September 23, 1982 (#82003454)	North of Gates, North Carolina, on U.S. Route 13; 36°33′03″N 76°45′20″W	Extends into Gates County, North Carolina
11	Glebe Church	Glebe Church	May 25, 1973 (#73002148)	West of Chesapeake City on State Route 337; 36°49′29″N 76°29′48″W	
12	Godwin-Knight House	Godwin-Knight House	August 24, 1992 (#92001028)	140 King's Highway; 36°51′42″N 76°34′41″W	C.B Godwin home built in 1780 and lived in by Ray and Mildred Knight, sister of Mills E. Godwin, Jr.
13	Joel E. Harrell and Son	Joel E. Harrell and Son	February 1, 2006 (#05001580)	110 Virginia Ham Dr. 36°44′32″N 76°33′30″W	
14	Holland Historic District	Holland Historic District	May 18, 1995 (#95000600)	Junction of U.S. Route 58 with State Route 189 and Dutch Rd. 36°40′53″N 76°46′48″W	
15	Knotts Creek-Belleville Archeological Site	Knotts Creek-Belleville Archeological Site	June 10, 2008 (#08000524)	0.2 miles west of the intersection of U.S. Route 17 and Town Point Rd. 36°51′53″N 76°26′27″W	
16	Mount Sinai Baptist Church	Mount Sinai Baptist Church	March 20, 2007 (#07000193)	6100 Holy Neck Rd. 36°38′14″N 76°49′46″W	
17	Nansemond County Training School	Nansemond County Training School	August 11, 2004 (#04000847)	9307 Southwestern Boulevard; 36°38′15″N 76°48′15″W	
18	Phillips Farm	Phillips Farm	October 30, 1998 (#98001318)	6353 Godwin Boulevard; 36°52′33″N 76°35′02″W	
19	Phoenix Bank of Nansemond	Phoenix Bank of Nansemond	January 24, 1991 (#90002159)	339 E. Washington St. 36°43′36″N 76°34′42″W	
20	Professional Building	Professional Building	August 12, 1999 (#99001005)	100 N. Main St. 36°43′42″N 76°34′59″W	
21	Riddick House	Riddick House	May 2, 1974 (#74002247)	510 Main St. 36°44′14″N 76°34′56″W	
22	St. John's Church	St. John's Church	April 11, 1973 (#73002149)	East of Chuckatuck on State Route 125; 36°51′26″N 76°33′40″W	Oldest church in Chuckatuck, est. 1642, present building completed 1756, external dimensions 60 x 30 feet, walls 21 inches thick. Date 1753 appears on south wall along with the initials A.H. and E.H. for Anthony Holladay and his wife Esther, who deeded the site to the parish.
23	Somerton Historic District	Somerton Historic District	December 31, 2008 (#08001272)	Arthur Dr., Pittmantown Rd., and Boonetown Rd. 36°34′06″N 76°45′03″W	
24	Suffolk Historic District	Suffolk Historic District	June 22, 1987 (#87000631)	Roughly bounded by railroad tracks, Hill St., Central Ave., and Holladay, Washington, N. Saratoga, and Pine Sts.; also roughly along N. Main St. from Constance Rd. to the Norfolk Southern railroad tracks; also roughly bounded by the Norfolk Southern railroad tracks, County St., Liberty St., Bank St., Market St., Clay St., and Poplar St.; also Pinner and Central Aves. and W. Washington St. 36°43′47″N 76°34′56″W	Second, third, and fourth sets of boundaries represent boundary increases of June 10, 1999, September 14, 2002, and December 3, 2004
25	The Suffolk Peanut Company	The Suffolk Peanut Company	November 22, 2016 (#16000801)	303 S. Saratoga St. 36°43′30″N 76°35′20″W	
26	West End Historic District	West End Historic District	January 16, 2004 (#03001433)	Roughly bounded by Causey Ave., the Seaboard Coast Line railroad tracks, Pender St., Wellons St., Linden Ave., and other railroad tracks; also roughly bounded by Wellons, Washington, and Smith Sts. 36°43′44″N 76°35′33″W	Second set of boundaries represents a boundary increase of November 27, 2004
27	Whaleyville Historic District	Whaleyville Historic District	April 7, 1995 (#95000392)	Junction of U.S. Route 13 and Mineral Spring Rd. 36°35′21″N 76°41′03″W	

== See also ==
- List of National Historic Landmarks in Virginia
- National Register of Historic Places listings in Virginia
