= Peter Myers Pork Packing Plant and Willard Coleman Building =

- U.S. National Register of Historic Places
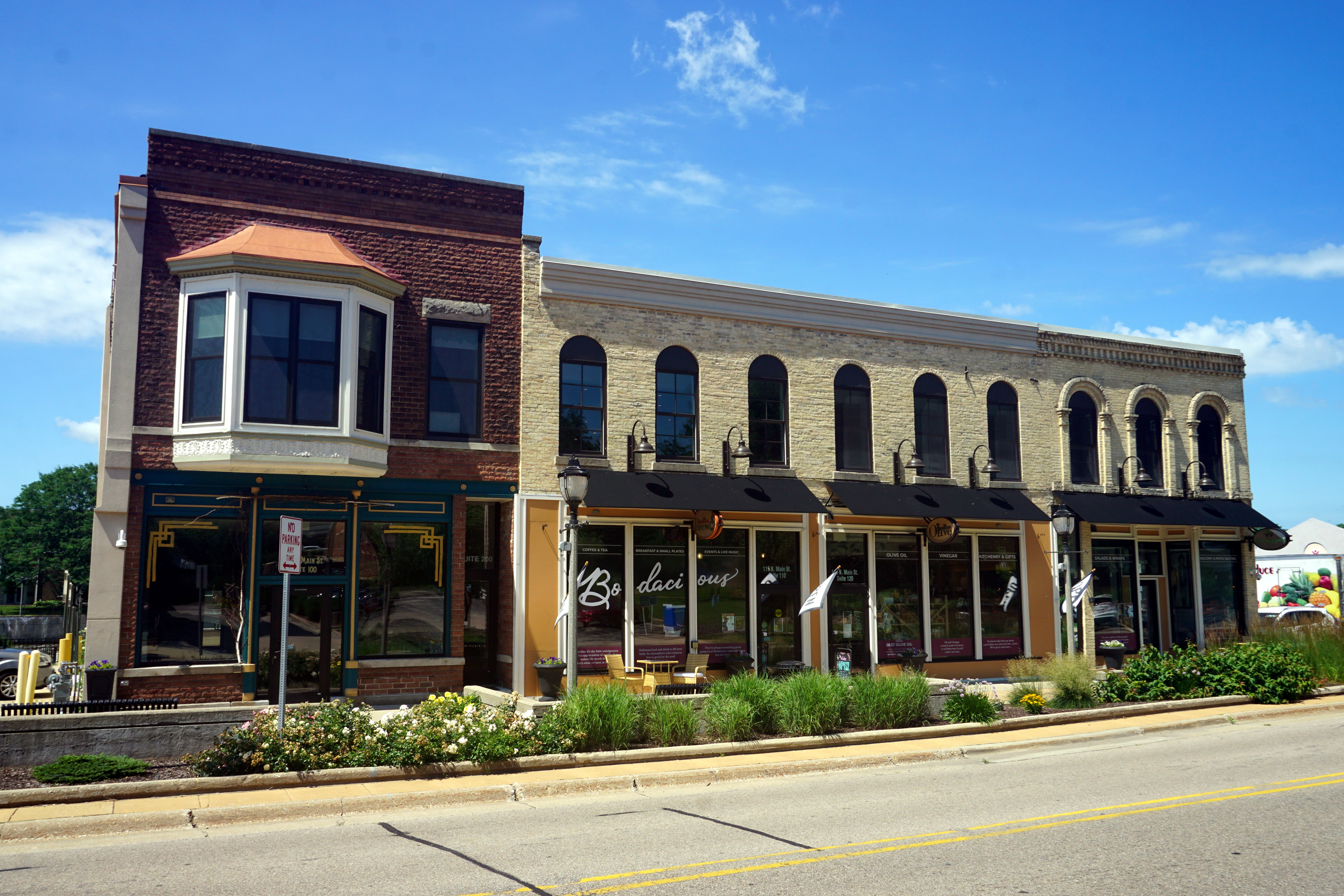

- Location within Wisconsin Location within the United States
- Location: 117-123 N. Main St., Janesville, Wisconsin
- Coordinates: 42°41′3″N 89°1′26″W
- Area: 0.5 acres (0.20 ha)
- Built: 1880
- Architectural style: Italianate
- NRHP reference No.: 83003418
- Added to NRHP: July 7, 1983

The Peter Myers Pork Packing Plant and Willard Coleman Building, in Janesville, Wisconsin, United States—also known as Koutsky & Berg—is a packing house that was built in 1851 in Italianate style. It was listed on the National Register of Historic Places in 1983.

It consists of two original properties, now three buildings, on North Main Street:

- 117 North Main Street - Willard Coleman, Painter (The Bear Trap Saloon), which was built c.1858-60, was renovated c. 1870–75, and modified 1900–02. It is a two-story red brick building with a cast iron front.
- 119-123 North Main Street - The Peter Myers Pork Packing Plant, now split between 119 North Main Street - Legal Action of Wisconsin and 121 North Main Street - The Main Waye - Women's Apparel and 123 North Main Street - Midwest Prosthetic-Orthotic Center. This was built c. 1857 and c. 1868. It is a two-story complex of two buildings, with Italianate architecture.

== See also ==
- Joel E. Harrell and Son: Another pork packing house on the NRHP
