= History of Suffolk, Virginia =

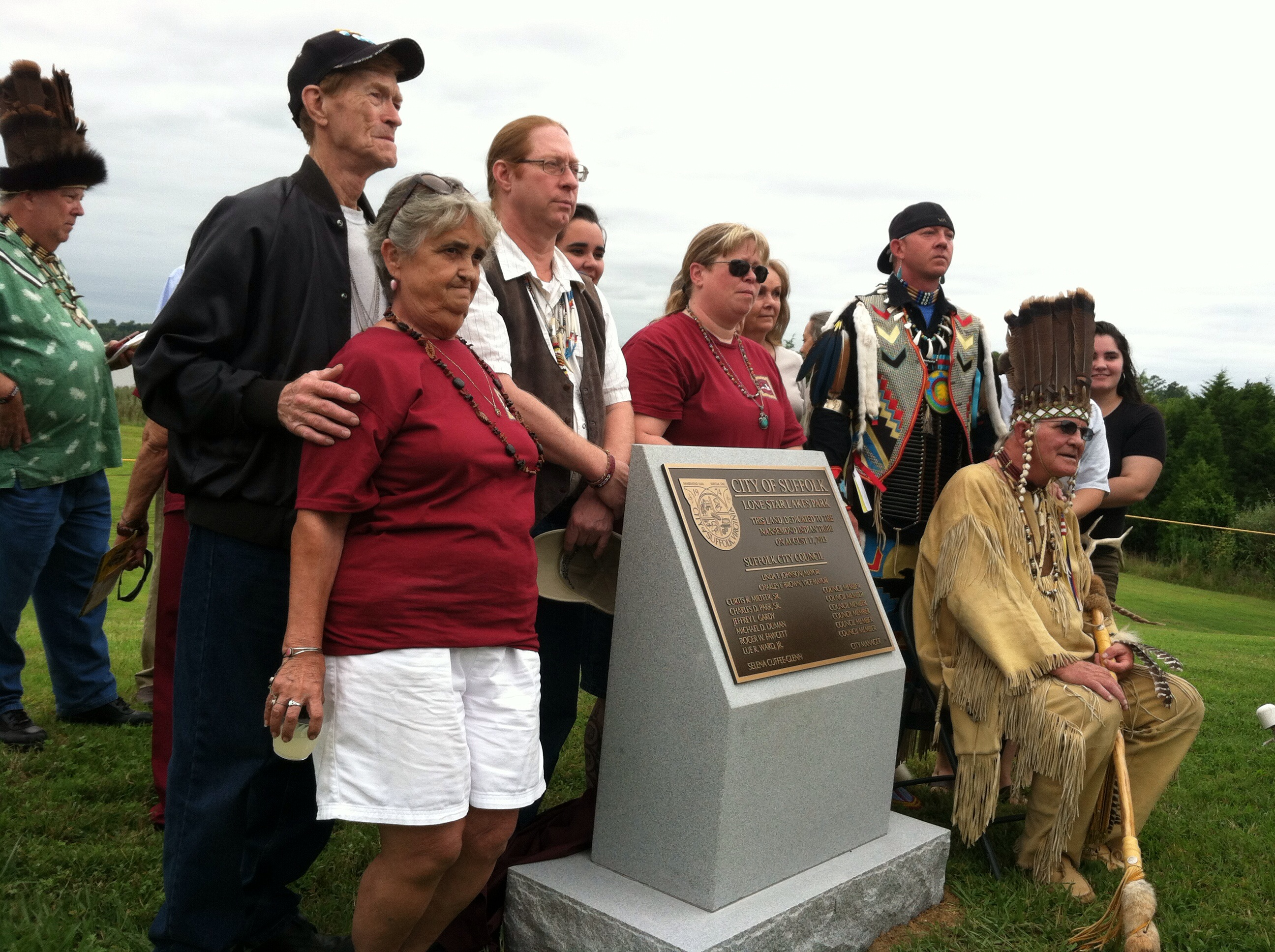
Nansemond Tribe members celebrating the dedication of a Suffolk city park to them in 2013

The area around Suffolk, Virginia, which is now an independent city in the Hampton Roads region in the southeastern part of the state, was originally inhabited by Native Americans. At the time of European contact, the Nansemond people lived along the river later known by the same name. The area was first explored by Jamestown colonists led by explorer John Smith soon after the settlements founding in 1607, seeking means to survive the inhospitable environment at Jamestown Island.

== Settlement by the Nansemond ==
By at least 1584, the Nansemond tribe originally lived in four villages along the Nansemond River, centered near Chuckatuck (now part of the city of Suffolk). Their head chief lived near Dumpling Island where the tribe’s temples and sacred items were located. At that time the tribe had a population of 1,200 persons with 300 bowmen.

In 1608, the explorer John Smith and other colonists from Jamestown began to explore the Nansemond River, following the river's oyster beds; upon discovering a Nansemond settlement, Smith and his party raided it, worsening tensions between the two groups. The next year, a Nansemond raiding party routed another expeditionary party led by Smith, who ransacked the tribe's temple in revenge. Despite such tensions, the fledgling colony soon began to expand, and soon settlers gained control of the area as they drove out the Nansemond— the tribe lost their last known reservation lands in 1792.

== Early colonial settlement through the American Revolution ==
The area in 1634 was originally a part of Elizabeth River Shire and then, in 1637, it became a part of Upper Norfolk County, which eventually in 1646 became Nansemond County. In the 1720s, John Constant settled along the Nansemond river (in what is now Suffolk) and built a home, wharf, and warehouse. Thus the site became known as "Constant's Warehouse." Under the Tobacco Inspection Act of 1730, one of the 40 tobacco inspection warehouses was chartered : " At the widow Constance's[sic], at Sleepy-Hole Point, in Nansemond County, under one inspection."

In 1742, the House of Burgesses, authorized a new town at Constant's Wharf, and named it "Suffolk" after Royal Governor Sir William Gooch's home county of Suffolk in East Anglia.

In 1750, the county seat of Nansemond County was moved from Jarnigan's or Cohoon's Bridge to Suffolk. Eventually, enslaved Africans were imported to work on ships and as artisans in the town, but especially as laborers on tobacco plantations. They were integral to the success of the area in exporting its tobacco crop. In some cases, slaves escaped to the nearby Great Dismal Swamp and joined the Great Dismal Swamp maroons.

During the American Revolutionary War, the town was burned by the British in 1779. It was totally destroyed after thousands of barrels of turpentine and pitch caught fire in warehouses along the river.

== Through the Civil War ==
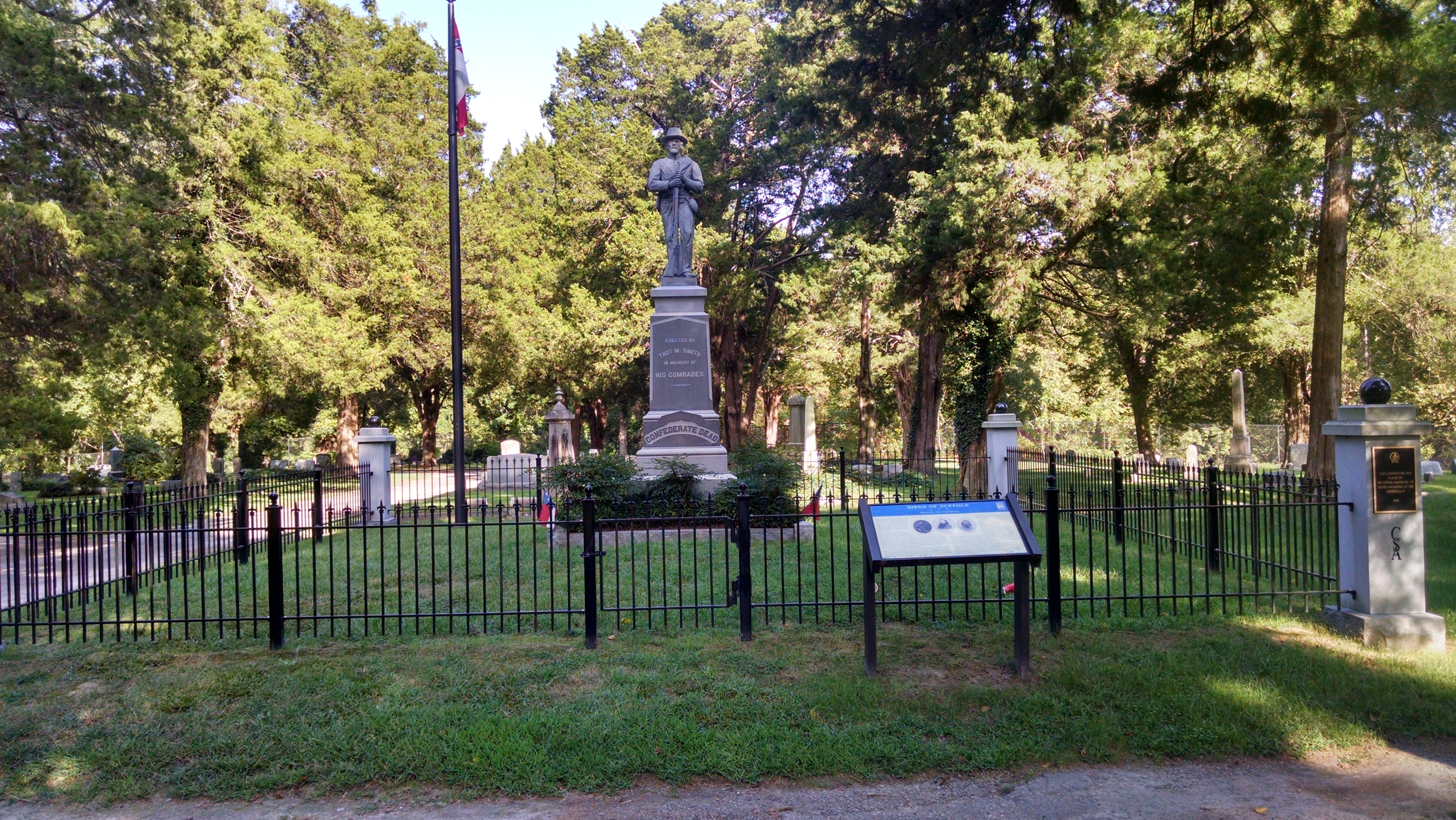
Monument to the Confederate dead in Cedar Hill Cemetery

Suffolk became an incorporated town in Nansemond County in 1808. As part of Virginia, it sided with the Confederacy in the American Civil War. From May 12, 1862, to July 3, 1863, the town was occupied by 25,000 Union troops under Major General John J. Peck. Peck made his headquarters in the Greek revival house now called "Riddick's Folly". Graffiti from the occupying soldiers and prisoners can still be seen on the walls.

During this period, Confederate General James Longstreet besieged the town with 20,000 men between April 11 and May 4, 1863 while gathering supplies for the Army of Northern Virginia. During the siege, General George Pickett would slip away to meet with his sweetheart and soon-to-be wife LaSalle (Sallie) Ann Corbell of Nansemond County. Longstreet was ordered to disengage by General Robert E. Lee and rejoin the Army of Northern Virginia at Fredericksburg. Two months later on July 3, the Union forces abandoned the town for strategic reasons, as decided by General John Adams Dix.

Confederate cavalry general Laurence S. Baker is buried in the town's Cedar Hill Cemetery.

== Later political history ==
Suffolk became a city independent from the surrounding county in 1910. At a practical level, the two remained closely linked, and the county seat remained at Suffolk after the city became politically independent. Thus it remained until 1972 when the county was converted to city status to become the short-lived lost city the City of Nansemond. On January 1, 1974, the City of Nansemond and the City of Suffolk united to become the present City of Suffolk, consolidating with the outlying incorporated towns of Holland and Whaleyville. The end result was a new municipality encompassing a total of 430 square miles (1,100 km^{2}), making it the largest city in land area in Virginia and the 16th largest in the country.

Suffolk celebrated its 400th anniversary in 2008. It is (as of 2008), the fastest-growing city in Virginia.

== The importance of peanuts ==
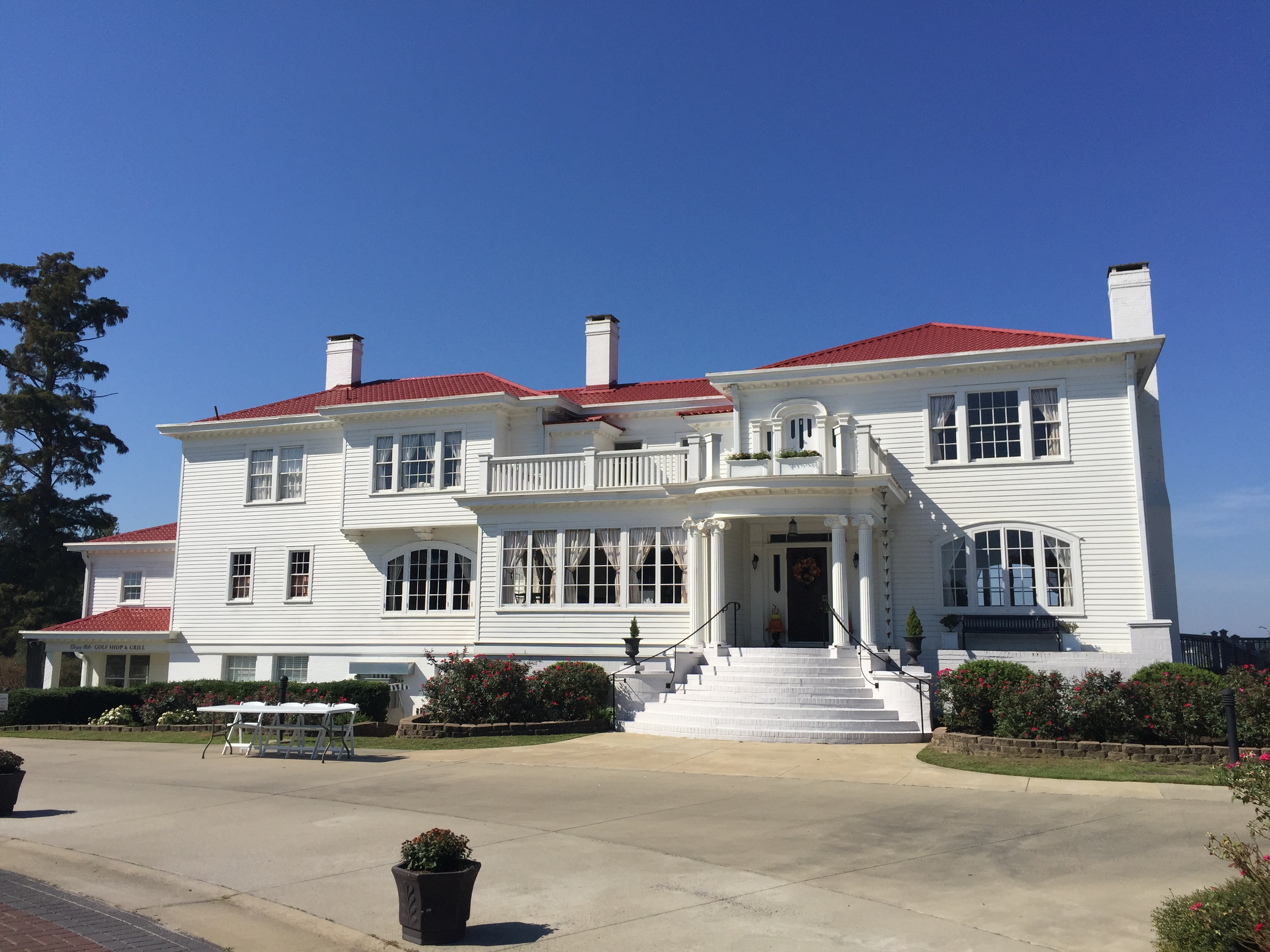
Obici House

In 1912, Italian immigrant Amedeo Obici came from Pennsylvania and opened facilities of the Planters Nut and Chocolate Company in Suffolk. He built on the widespread cultivation of peanuts in the area. By 1941, Suffolk had been declared "The Peanut Capital of the World". The city also became home to Planters' Mr. Peanut, a world-famous advertising icon (voted the country's third-most popular in 2004). A statue of Mr. Peanut is prominently displayed in downtown Suffolk. The company, now owned by Kraft Foods, is one of Suffolk's ten largest employers.

In 1924 Obici and his wife Louise settled at Bay Point Farm in Chuckatuck on a bluff overlooking the Nansemond River. Their home, which has been designated a Virginia Historic Landmark, now belongs to the City of Suffolk. In memory of his wife, Obici donated funds for the construction of what became the Louise Obici Memorial Hospital in Suffolk, which opened in 1951. In 2002, a newer facility, the Obici Sentara Hospital, opened as its successor.

For many years, the call letters of local AM radio station WLPM stood for World's Largest Peanut Market. Today, Suffolk remains a major peanut processing center.

== The railroad ==
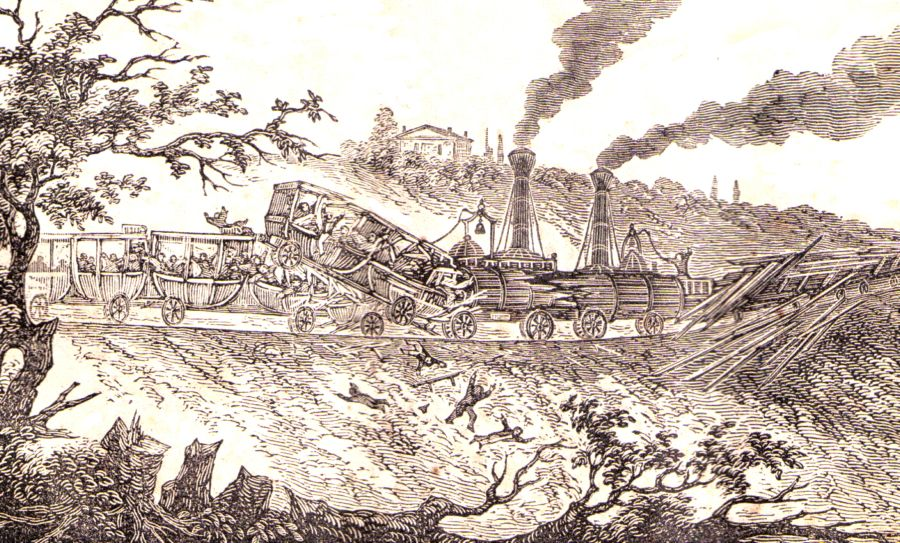
Depiction of a rail accident in Suffolk in 1840

As a gateway to Norfolk and Portsmouth, Suffolk became a major rail interchange point, served at one time or another by many of Virginia's railroads. Before the American Civil War, both the Portsmouth and Roanoke Railroad and the Norfolk and Petersburg Railroad were built through Suffolk, early predecessors of 21st century Class 1 railroads operated by CSX Transportation and Norfolk Southern respectively. The Atlantic Coast Line Railroad, the Atlantic and Danville Railroad, and the Virginian Railway also built through Suffolk on their way to the harbor at Hampton Roads.

== Tornado ==
On April 28, 2008, a massive tornado moved through portions of Suffolk. The tornado is considered one of the strongest tornadoes to strike the state of Virginia in recent history and the worst to strike Hampton Roads since a tornado spawned by the remnants of Tropical Storm Dennis nine years before. The 2008 tornado was rated EF3 on the Enhanced Fujita Scale.

== See also ==
- List of mayors of Suffolk, Virginia
