= Mt. Sinai Baptist Church =

Mt. Sinai Baptist Church may refer to:

- Mt. Sinai Baptist Church (Eden, North Carolina)
- Mt. Sinai Baptist Church (Suffolk, Virginia)
- Mt. Sinai Baptist Church (Prattville, Alabama); associated with Mt. Sinai School
