= List of mayors of Suffolk, Virginia =

Mayors of the city of Suffolk, Virginia, USA

The following is a list of mayors of the city of Suffolk, Virginia, USA.

== Mayors ==
- Richard L. Brewer, 1852-1856
- Thomas S. Shepherd, 1856-1858
- John G. Pinner, 1858-1860
- Benjamin Riddick, 1860–1864, 1875-1883
- C. W. Lassiter, 1871-1872
- Thomas G. Elam, 1872-1873
- John R. Copeland, 1873-1874
- Nathaniel Riddick, 1874-1875
- Robert R. Prentis, 1883-1885
- Edward E. Holland, 1885-1887
- Richard Lewis Brewer Jr., ca.1893-1905
- John Ballentine Norfleet, 1907-1911
- J. H. Macleary, 1919-1926
- T. H. Birdsong, 1926-1931
- Otis S. Smith, 1931-1935
- Jack Nurney, 1935-1941
- Baynard O. Hill, 1941-1947
- Jack C. West, 1947-1949
- William F. Whitley, 1949-1951
- R. L. Woodward Jr., 1951-1955
- W. P. Griffin, 1955-1957, 1958-1959, 1959-1961
- Major T. Benton, 1961-1966
- James A. Hope 1966-1970, 1970-1974, 1974-1978
- J. W. Nelms, 1978-1980
- Dr. George Barnett, 1980-1982
- Andy Damiani, 1982-1986
- Johnnie E. Mizzelle, 1986-1990
- James A. Hope, 1990-1992
- Chris Jones, 1992-1996
- Thomas G. Underwood, 1996-1998
- Dana Dickens, 1998-2000
- Curtis Milteer, 2000-2002
- Dana Dickens, 2002-2004
- Bobby Ralph, 2004-2006
- Linda T. Johnson, 2006-2020
- Michael Duman, 2021–present

== See also ==
- History of Suffolk, Virginia
