= Edward E. Holland =

American politician (1861–1941)

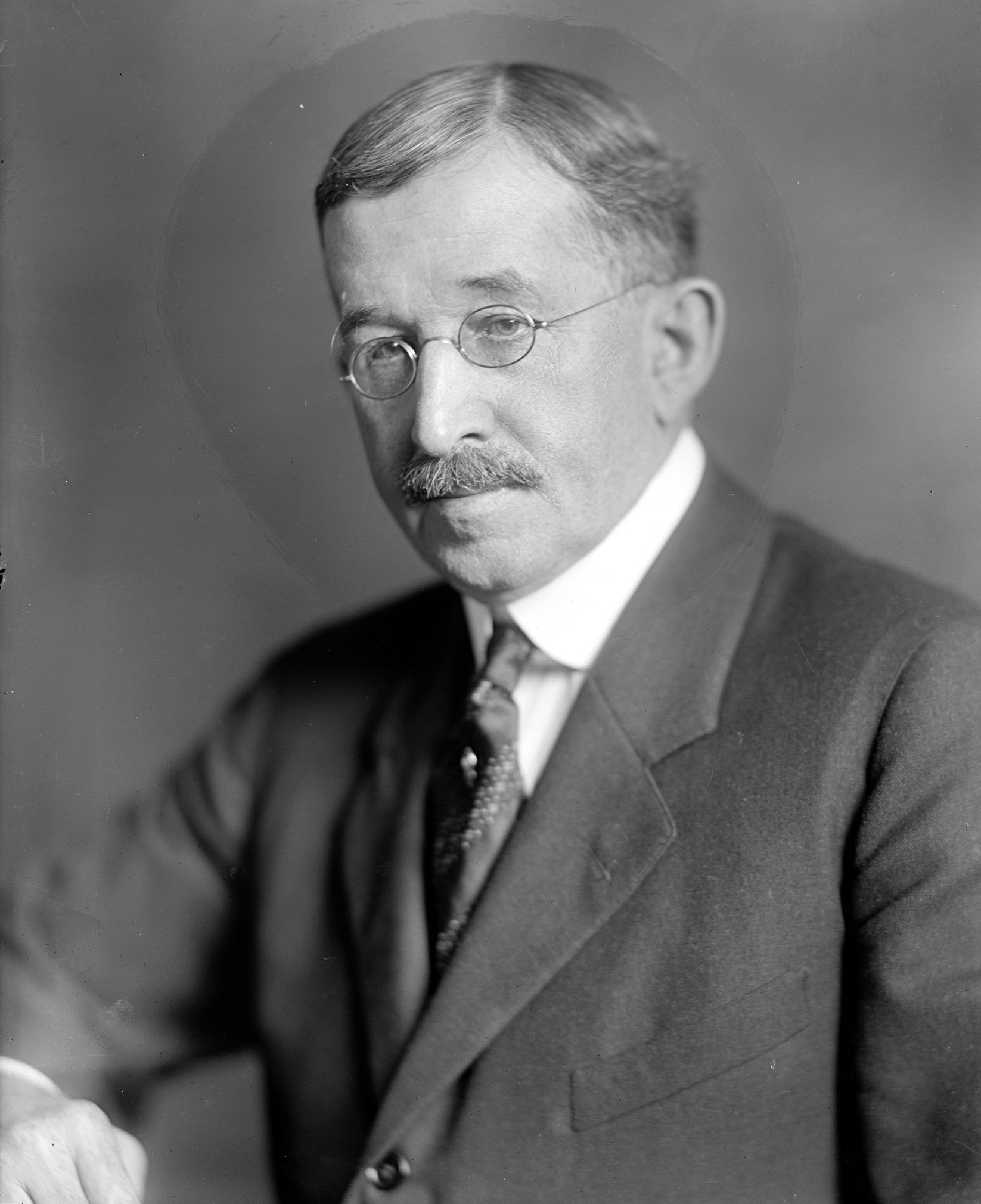
- Holland, 1905–1941

Member of the Virginia Senate from the 5th district
- In office January 8, 1930 – October 23, 1941
- Preceded by: Cecil C. Vaughan, Jr.
- Succeeded by: Allie E. S. Stephens

Member of the U.S. House of Representatives from Virginia's 2nd district
- In office March 4, 1911 – March 3, 1921
- Preceded by: Harry L. Maynard
- Succeeded by: Joseph T. Deal

Member of the Virginia Senate from the 30th district
- In office January 8, 1908 – March 4, 1911
- Preceded by: William Shands
- Succeeded by: Junius E. West

Personal details
- Born: Edward Everett Holland; February 26, 1861 Suffolk, Virginia, U.S.
- Died: October 23, 1941 (aged 80) Suffolk, Virginia, U.S.
- Resting place: Cedar Hill Cemetery
- Party: Democratic
- Education: Richmond College (B.A.); University of Virginia (LL.B.)
- Profession: lawyer, banker

Edward Everett Holland (February 26, 1861 – October 23, 1941) was an American lawyer, banker, and politician who served as a U.S. representative from Virginia from 1911 to 1921.

== Early life and education ==
Born near Suffolk, Virginia, to Ann Scott Pretlow and her husband, Zechariah Holland, Holland attended private schools. He attended the Richmond College, then studied law at the University of Virginia School of Law in Charlottesville, Virginia.

He was admitted to the bar in 1882 and commenced practice in Suffolk, Virginia. He served as mayor of Suffolk from 1885 to 1887, then was elected the Commonwealth's attorney (prosecutor) for Nansemond County, serving from 1887 to 1907.

Holland became president of the Farmers Bank of Nansemond in 1892. He served as a member of the State senate from 1908 to 1911.

=== Congress and later career ===
Holland was elected as a Democrat to the Sixty-second and to the four succeeding Congresses (March 4, 1911 – March 3, 1921). He was not a candidate for renomination in 1920. He resumed his banking pursuits. He served as a delegate to the Democratic National Convention in 1920 and 1924.

He served as member of the Senate of Virginia during the years 1930–1941.

== Death and legacy ==
He died in Suffolk, Virginia, on October 23, 1941, and was interred in Cedar Hill Cemetery, Suffolk, Virginia. His home at Suffolk, the Building at 216 Bank Street, was added to the National Register of Historic Places in 1985

== Electoral history ==
- 1910: Holland was elected to the U.S. House of Representatives defeating Republican H.H. Humble and Independent C.E. Good, winning 78.99% of the vote.
- 1912: Holland was re-elected defeating Progressive Nathaniel T. Green and Independents Isaiah A. Chesman and B.D. Downey, winning 89.07% of the vote.
- 1914: Holland was re-elected defeating Socialist E.B. Everton and Socialist Labor S.L. Ford, winning 88% of the vote.
- 1916: Holland was re-elected defeating Republican Luther B. Way and Socialist Robert D. McElvary, winning 83.06% of the vote.
- 1918: Holland was re-elected unopposed.

== See also ==
- List of mayors of Suffolk, Virginia

== Sources ==
- United States Congress. "Edward E. Holland (id: H000716)". Biographical Directory of the United States Congress.

U.S. House of Representatives
Preceded by Harry L. Maynard	Member of the U.S. House of Representatives from Virginia's 2nd congressional district 1911–1921	Succeeded by Joseph T. Deal
