= Dumpling Island Archeological Site =

Archaeological site in Virginia, United States

- U.S. National Register of Historic Places
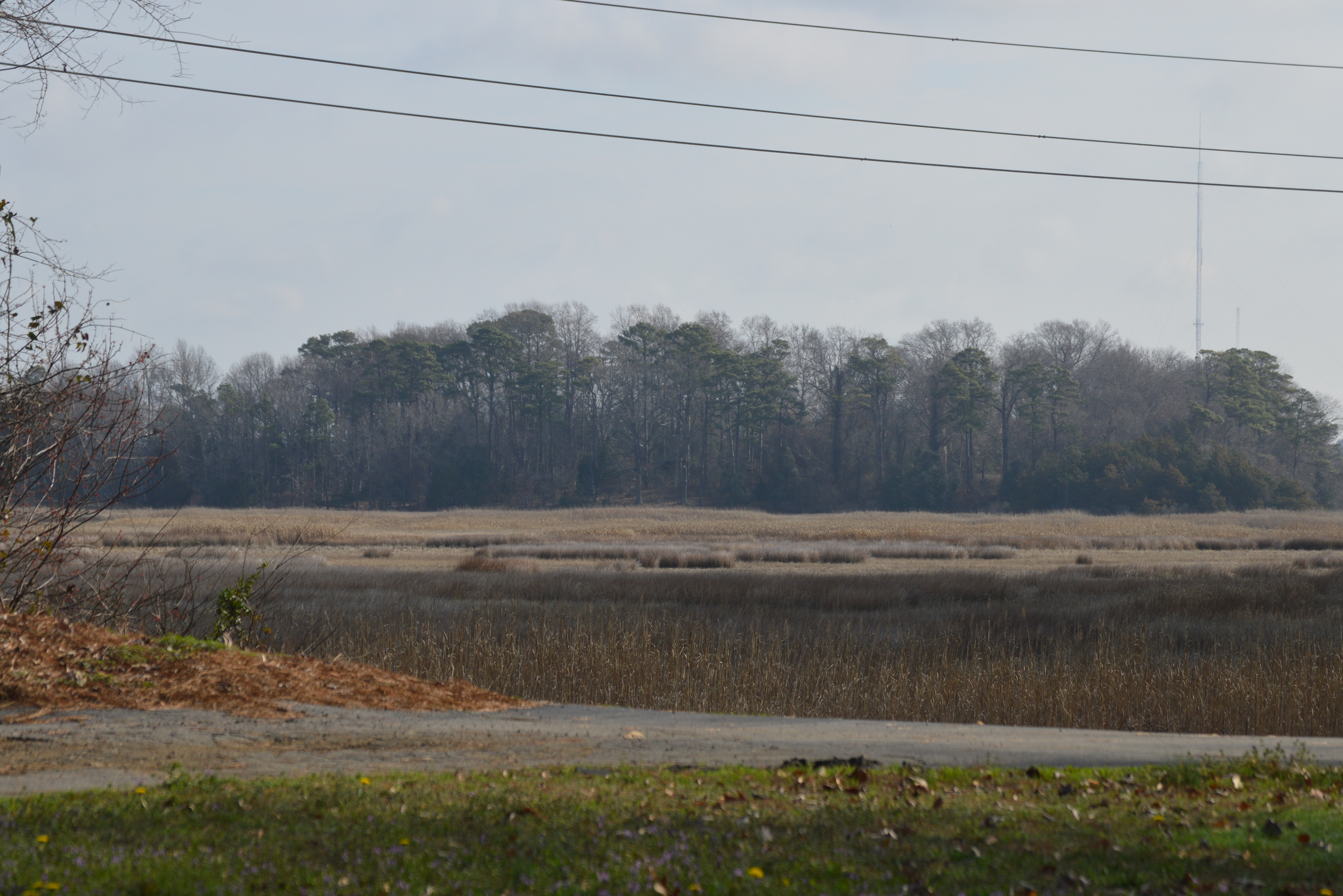
- Overview from southwest
- Nearest city: Suffolk, Virginia
- Area: 14 acres (5.7 ha)
- Built: 1609
- NRHP reference No.: 98000046
- Added to NRHP: February 10, 1998

The Dumpling Island Archeological Site is a Late Woodland period archaeological site on Dumpling Island in Suffolk, Virginia, United States. The site encompasses the remains of a Native American village associated with the Nansemond people. The island was identified by explorer John Smith as a "white chaukie iland" (white chalky island) because of the large shell middens he saw.

The Nansemond village was attacked and burned by English colonists from the Jamestown Colony in 1609 but quickly recovered. Test excavations in 1986 and 1995 found the site to be in excellent condition.

The site was listed on the National Register of Historic Places in 1998.

== See also ==
- National Register of Historic Places listings in Suffolk, Virginia
