= Knotts Creek-Belleville Archeological Site =

Archaeological site in Virginia, United States

- Knotts Creek – Belleville Archeological Site
- U.S. National Register of Historic Places
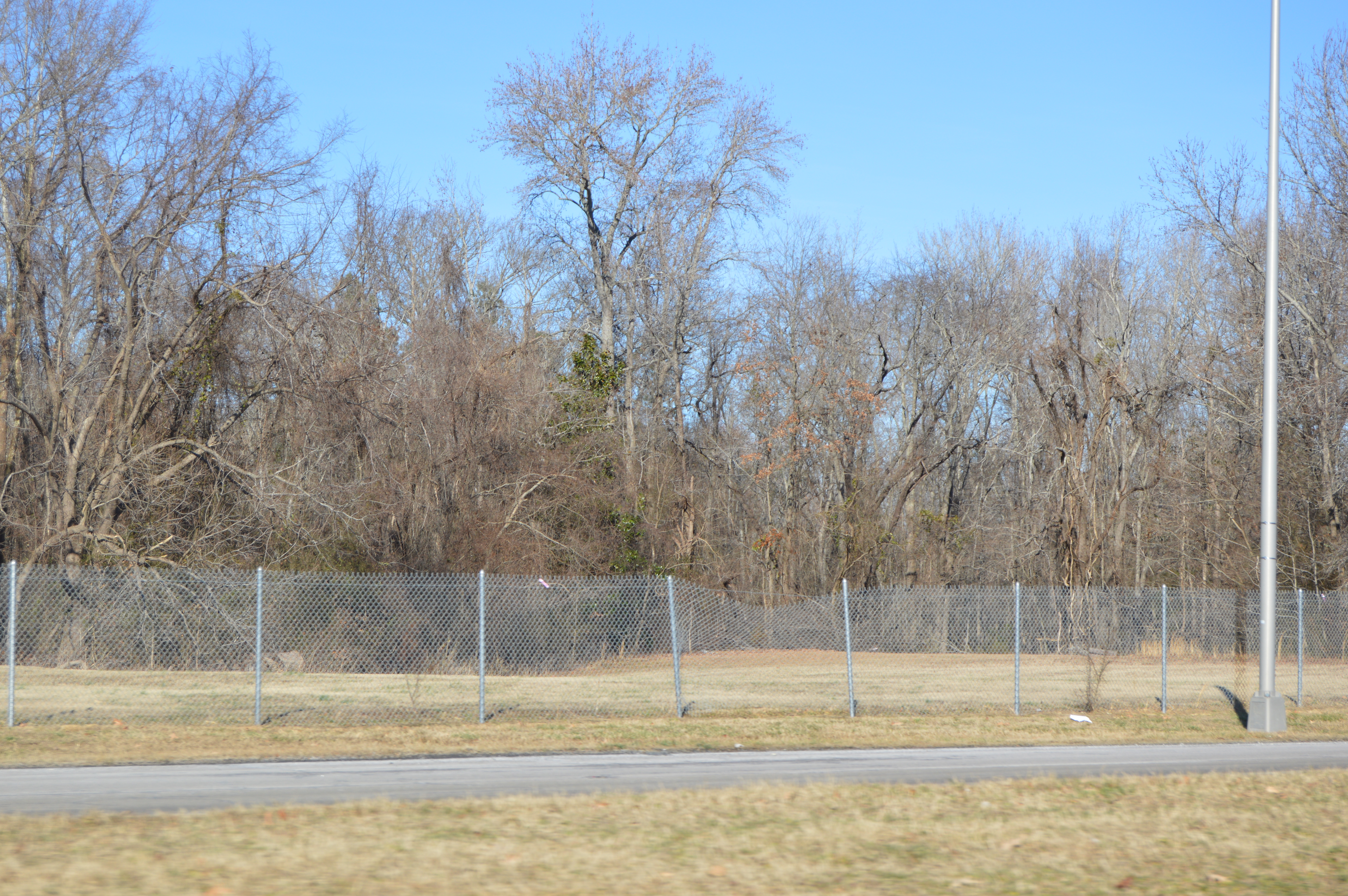
- Overview from U.S. Route 13
- Nearest city: Suffolk, Virginia
- Area: 1 acre (0.40 ha)
- NRHP reference No.: 08000524
- Added to NRHP: June 10, 2008

The Knotts Creek – Belleville Archeological Site (Smithsonian trinomial: 44SK194) is a historically significant site along Knotts Brook in Suffolk, Virginia. The site includes evidence of Native American settlement during the Middle and Late Woodland periods (c. 500BC to 1600AD), and also includes evidence of English colonial settlement during the 17th century. The site was identified in the 1980s and partially excavated in the 1990s. Finds at the site include Delftware ceramics, evidence of a wooden palisade of English construction, and prehistoric stone tools and bone fragments.

The site was listed on the National Register of Historic Places in 2008.

== See also ==
- National Register of Historic Places listings in Suffolk, Virginia
