= Suffolk Peanut Company =

- The Suffolk Peanut Company
- U.S. National Register of Historic Places
- U.S. Historic district
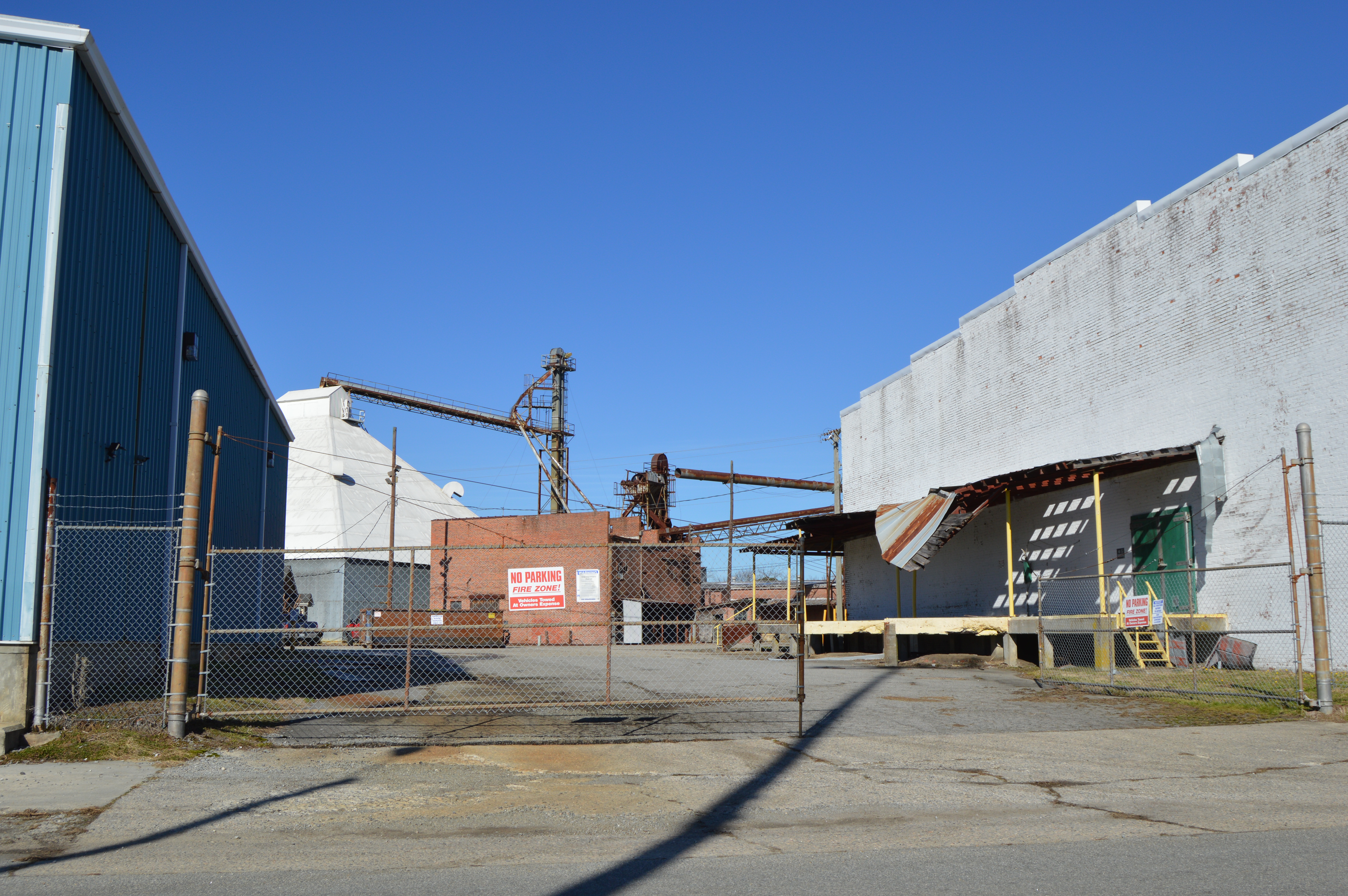
- Scene on Saratoga St.

- Location within Virginia Location within the United States
- Location: 303 S. Saratoga St., Suffolk, Virginia
- Coordinates: 36°43′30″N 76°35′20″W
- Area: 10 acres (4.0 ha)
- Built: 1902
- Architect: Alexander Dupre Breeden
- Architectural style: Early 20th Century Commercial
- NRHP reference No.: 16000801
- Added to NRHP: November 22, 2016

The Suffolk Peanut Company is a historic peanut processing complex at 303 South Saratoga Street in Suffolk, Virginia. The complex includes a number of warehouses dating from the first half of the 20th century, and a peanut processing plant dating back to 1932. The site has been used for the processing, sorting, and storage of peanuts since about 1902. It is believed to be the state's largest peanut processing operation.

The company property was added to the National Register of Historic Places in 2016.

== See also ==
- National Register of Historic Places listings in Suffolk, Virginia
