= Building at 216 Bank Street =

Historic residential building in Virginia, United States

- U.S. National Register of Historic Places
- Virginia Landmarks Register
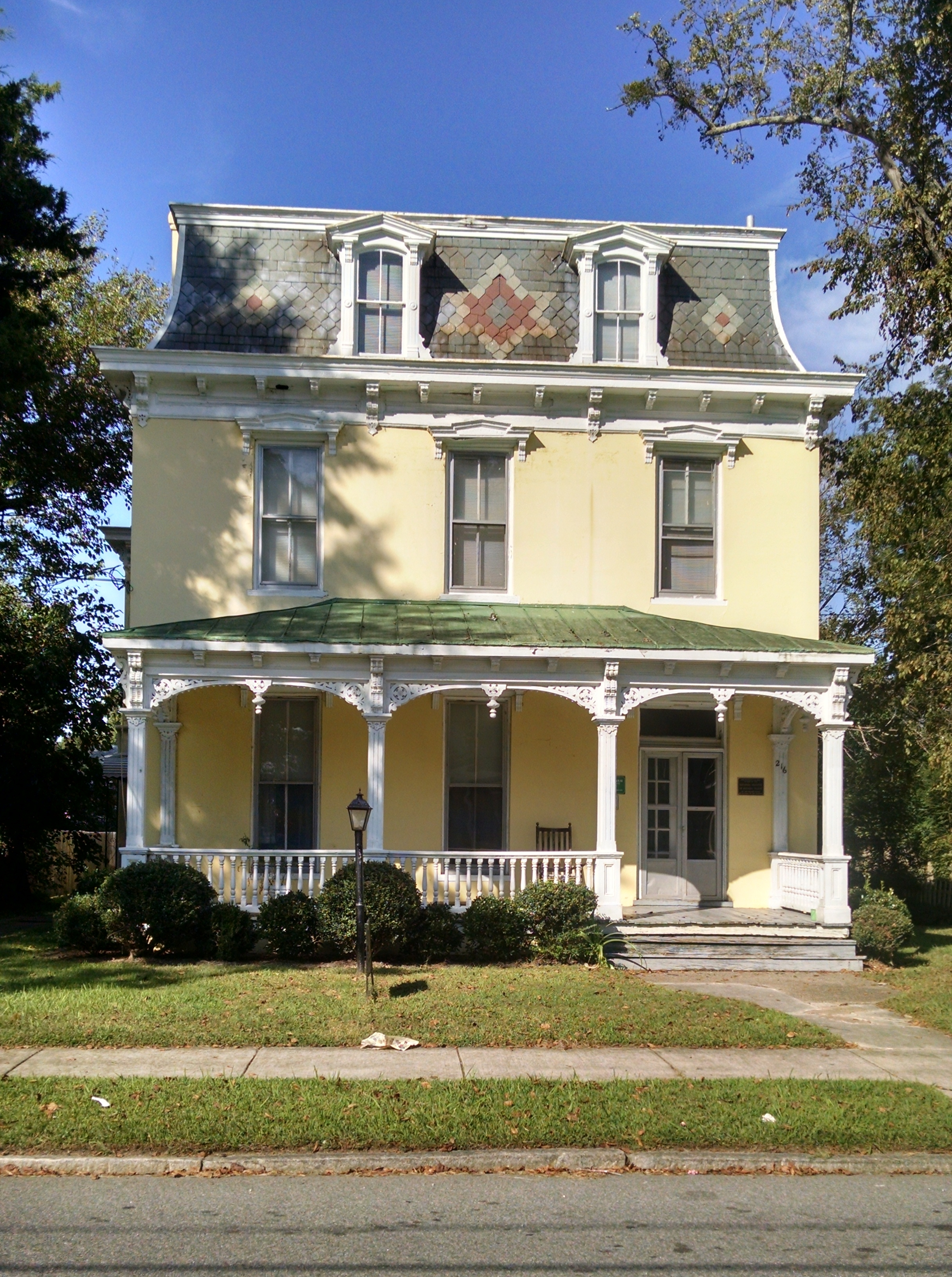

- Location within Virginia Location within the United States
- Location: 216 Bank St., Suffolk, Virginia
- Coordinates: 36°43′45″N 76°34′49″W
- Area: 0.3 acres (0.12 ha)
- Built: c. 1885
- Architectural style: Second Empire
- NRHP reference No.: 85002765
- VLR No.: 133-0007

Significant dates
- Added to NRHP: November 7, 1985
- Designated VLR: August 13, 1985

Building at 216 Bank Street, also known as Holland House Apartments, is a historic home located at Suffolk, Virginia. It was built about 1885, and is a 2 1/2-story, three bay stuccoed brick Second Empire style building. It has a polychromatic slate mansard roof and a full-width, one-story, hipped roof front porch. It was built for Colonel Edward Everett Holland as a single-family dwelling. It was occupied by the Suffolk Elks Lodge No. 685 from 1940 to 1965, then converted to a six-unit apartment building.

It was added to the National Register of Historic Places in 1985.

== See also ==
- National Register of Historic Places listings in Suffolk, Virginia
