= Godwin–Knight House =

Historic house in Virginia, United States

- U.S. National Register of Historic Places
- U.S. Historic district – Contributing property
- Virginia Landmarks Register
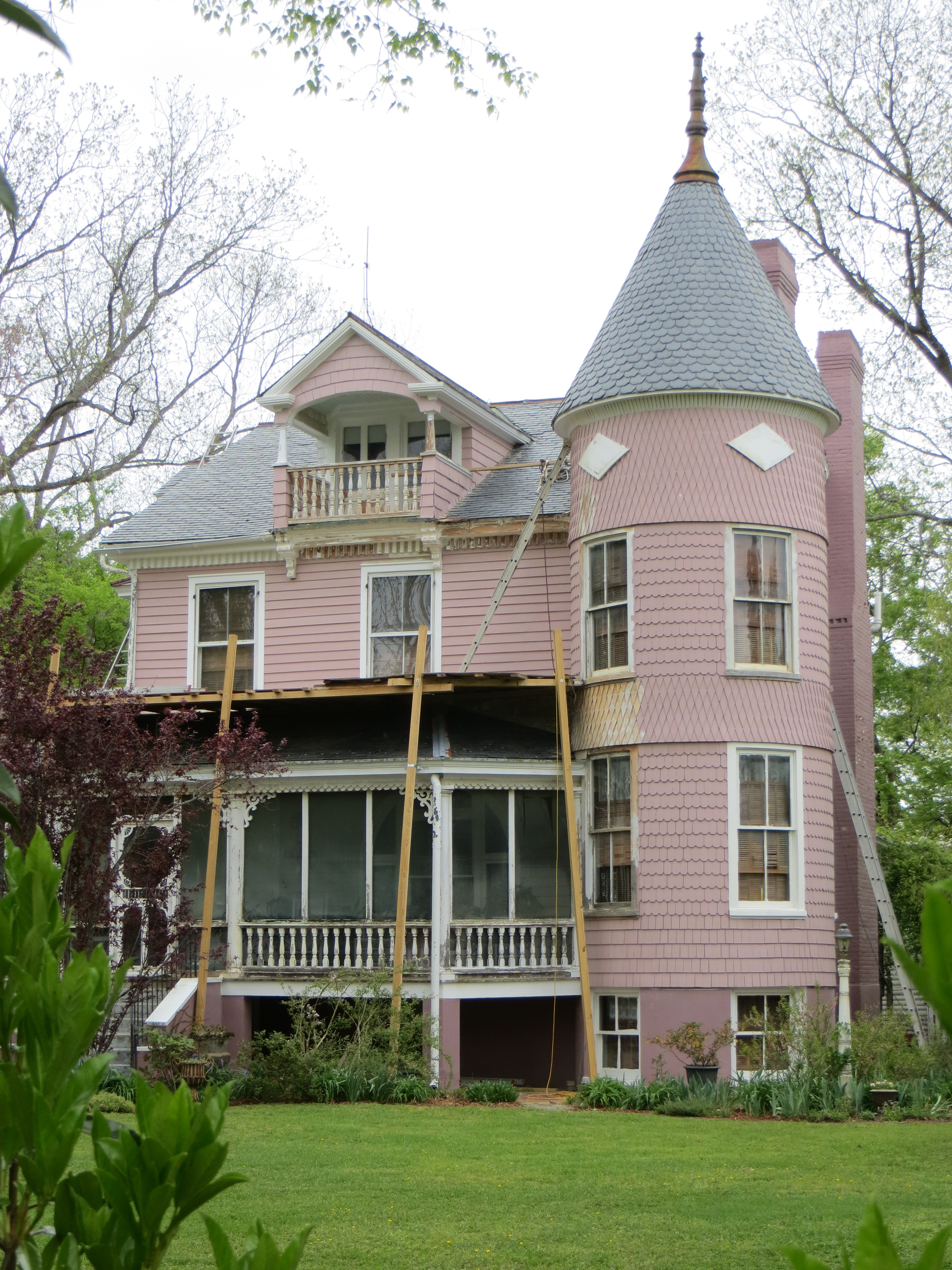
- Godwin–Knight House, April 2013

- Location within Virginia Location within the United States
- Location: 140 King's Hwy., Chuckatuck, Virginia
- Coordinates: 36°51′41″N 76°34′40″W
- Area: 1.4 acres (0.57 ha)
- Built: 1856, 1898
- Architectural style: Queen Anne, Federal
- NRHP reference No.: 92001028
- VLR No.: 133-0576

Significant dates
- Added to NRHP: August 24, 1992
- Designated VLR: February 28, 1992

Godwin–Knight House is a historic home located at Chuckatuck, Virginia. It was built in 1856, in the Federal style, then elaborately remodeled about 1898 in the Queen Anne style. It is a 2 1/2-story, three-bay, double-pile side-hall-plan frame dwelling. hipped roof front porch. It features a wraparound porch and a corner tower with conical roof. Also on the property are the contributing summer kitchen, smokehouse, woodshed / Delco house, two chicken house, a garage, and a barn / stable. It was the boyhood home of Virginia Governor Mills E. Godwin, Jr.

It was added to the National Register of Historic Places in 1985. It is located in the Chuckatuck Historic District.
