= Bay Point Farm =

- U.S. National Register of Historic Places
- Virginia Landmarks Register
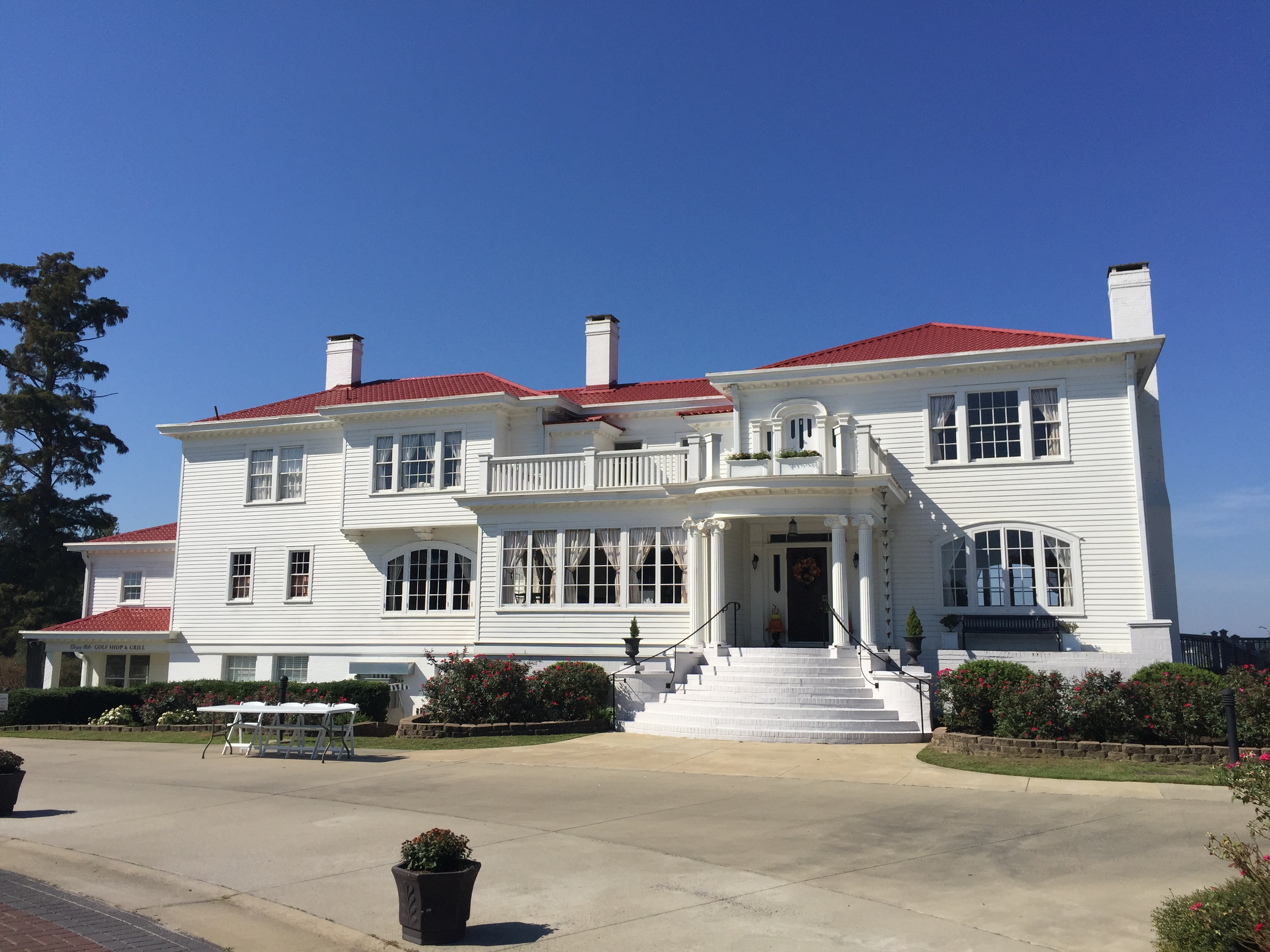
- Obici House, 2018

- Location within Virginia Location within the United States
- Location: 1400 Sleepy Hole Rd., Suffolk, Virginia
- Coordinates: 36°50′42″N 76°31′00″W
- Area: 25 acres (10 ha)
- Built: 1924-1925
- Architectural style: Renaissance
- NRHP reference No.: 03000571
- VLR No.: 133-5049

Significant dates
- Added to NRHP: June 23, 2003
- Designated VLR: March 19, 2003

Bay Point Farm, also known as the Bay Point Dairy Farm, the Obici House, and Sleepy Hole Golf Course, is an American historic home and dairy farm located at Suffolk, Virginia. The main house is an irregularly planned Italian Renaissance style house overlooking the Nansemond River. It is a two-story, single-family dwelling, with the original section dated to about 1870. The two end blocks were added in 1925 and have hipped roofs. Associated with the house are the garage, a silo, storage building, large farm building, and small shed. Bay Point Farm was the home of Amedeo Obici, the Planters Nut and Chocolate Company founder. Obici purchased Bay Point Farm in 1924 and remained in Suffolk at Bay Point Farm until his death in 1947.

It was added to the National Register of Historic Places in 2003.

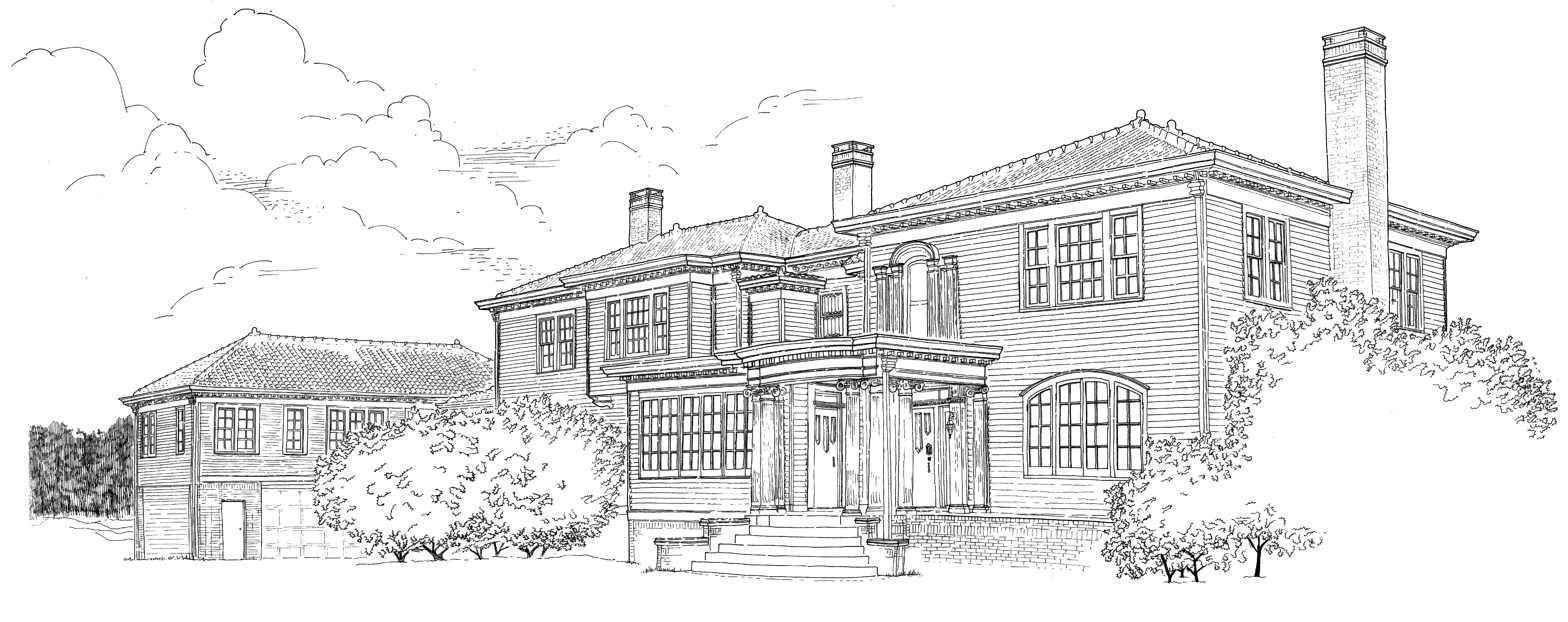
HABS drawing of the house
