= Whaleyville Historic District =

Historic district in Virginia, United States

- U.S. National Register of Historic Places
- U.S. Historic district
- Virginia Landmarks Register
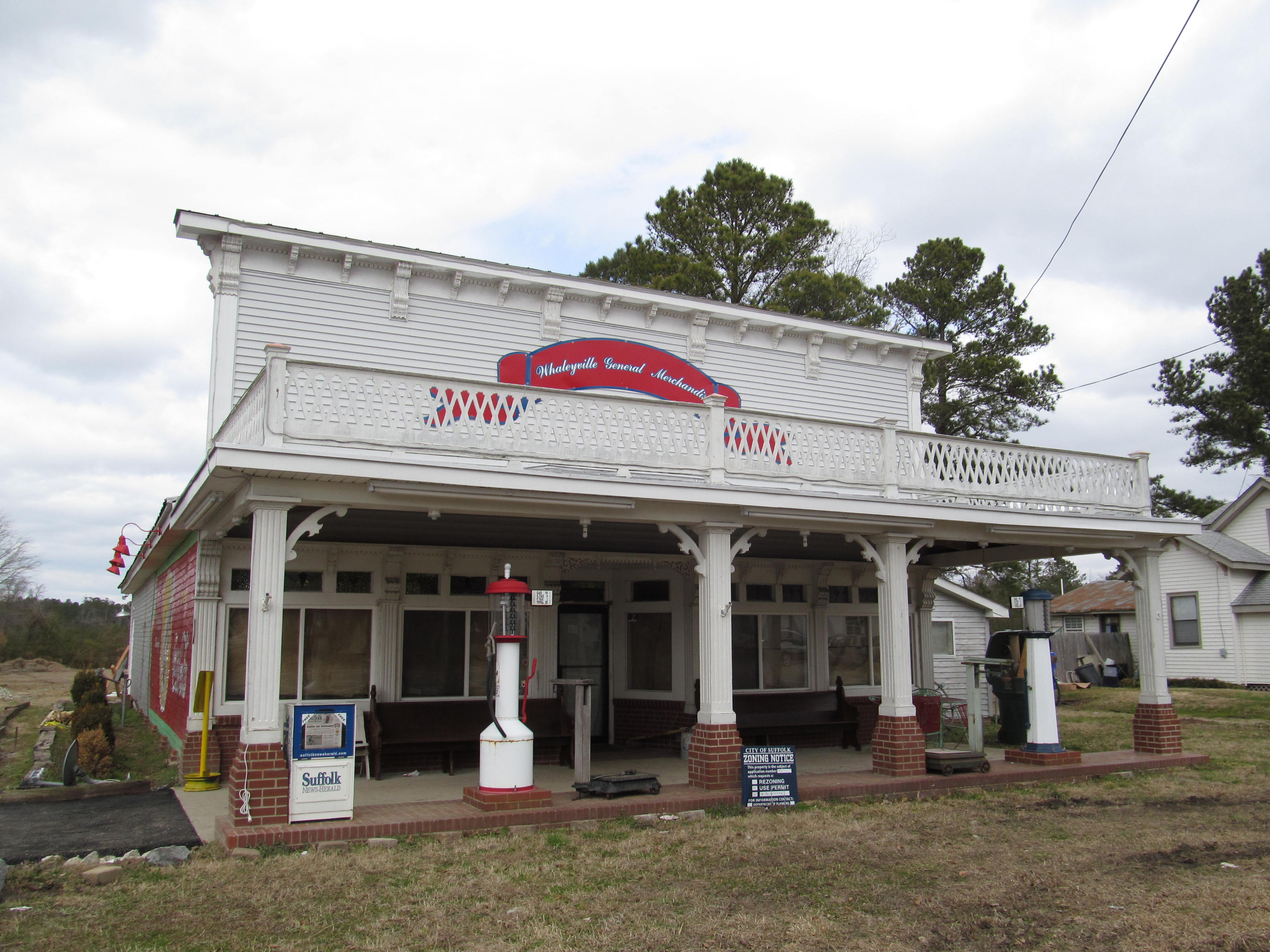
- Whaleyville Store

- Location within Virginia Location within the United States
- Location: Jct. of US 13 and VA 616, Suffolk, Virginia
- Coordinates: 36°35′25″N 76°41′03″W
- Area: 39.5 acres (16.0 ha)
- Built: 1874
- Architectural style: Bungalow/craftsman, Queen Anne
- NRHP reference No.: 95000392
- VLR No.: 133-0694

Significant dates
- Added to NRHP: April 7, 1995
- Designated VLR: September 15, 1992

Whaleyville Historic District is a national historic district located at Suffolk, Virginia. The district encompasses 103 contributing buildings in the African-American community of Whaleyville in Suffolk. The district includes eight residences, two churches, two school structures, a train depot, a lodge, an outbuilding, and five commercial structures. They are in a variety of vernacular and popular turn-of-the 20th century architectural styles including Queen Anne and Bungalow. Notable buildings include the St. Stephens Holiness Church, Mineral Spring Baptist Church, Odd Fellows Lodge, McAlister Masonic Lodge, Bank of Whaleyville, and the Whaleyville Store.

It was added to the National Register of Historic Places in 1995.
