= Chuckatuck Historic District =

Historic district in Virginia, United States

- U.S. National Register of Historic Places
- U.S. Historic district
- Virginia Landmarks Register
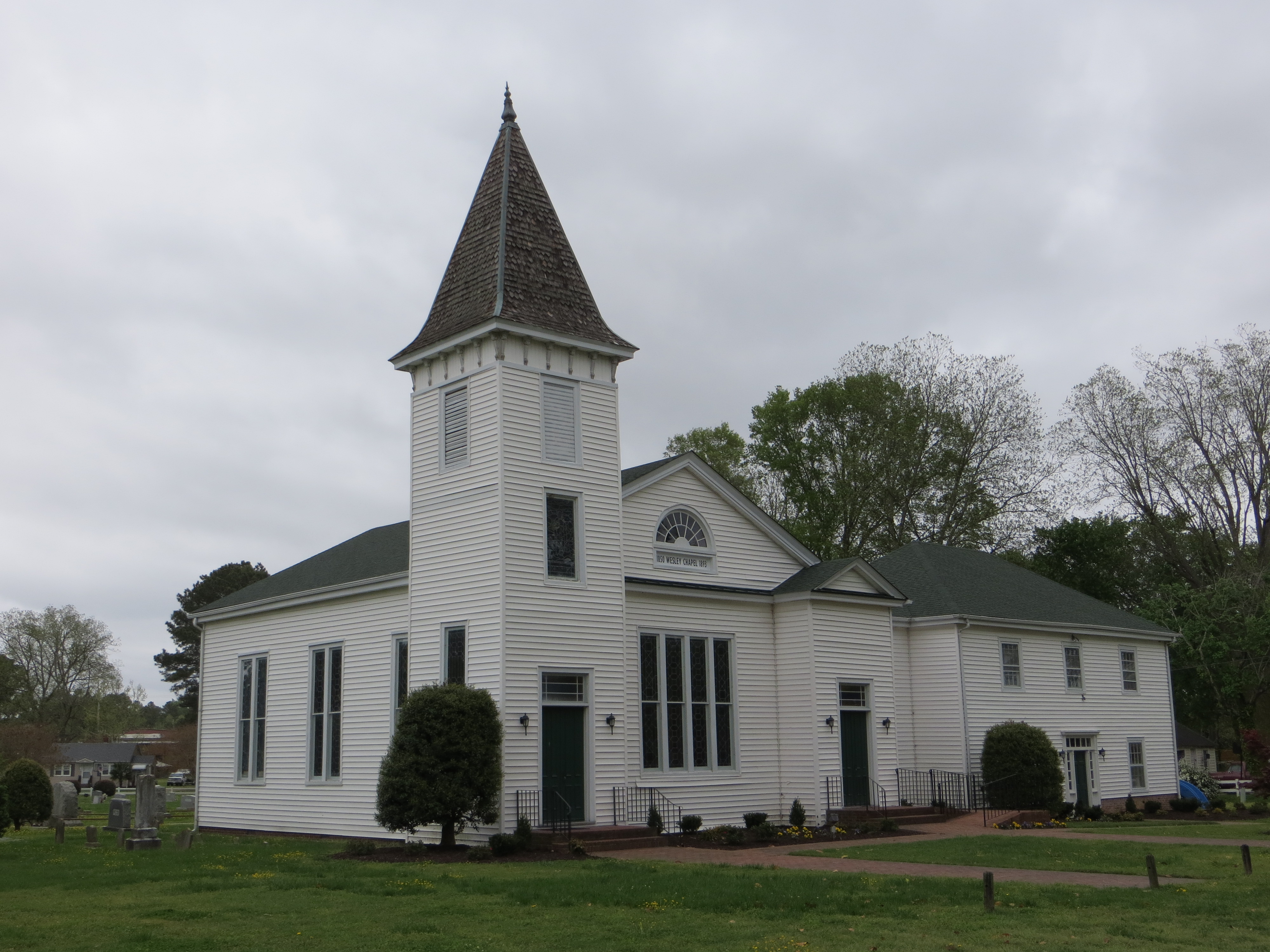
- Wesley Chapel, April 2013

- Location within Virginia Location within the United States
- Location: Jct. of VA 10/32 and VA 125, Suffolk, Virginia
- Coordinates: 36°51′40″N 76°34′45″W
- Area: 20 acres (8.1 ha)
- Architectural style: Federal, Queen Anne, Bungalow/craftsman
- NRHP reference No.: 95000393
- VLR No.: 133-0692

Significant dates
- Added to NRHP: April 7, 1995
- Designated VLR: September 15, 1992

Chuckatuck Historic District is a national historic district located at Chuckatuck, Suffolk, Virginia. The district encompasses 51 contributing buildings and 2 contributing structures in the crossroads community of Chuckatuck in Suffolk. The district includes dwellings in a variety of popular 19th and early-20th century architectural styles including Federal, Queen Anne, and Bungalow. Notable buildings include the Saunders House (1780-1820), Howell House, Cannon House, Wesley Chapel United Methodist Church (1893), W. C. Moore House, and the Gwaltney Store. Located in the district is the separately listed Godwin–Knight House.

It was added to the National Register of Historic Places in 1995.
