= Phillips Farm =

Historic house in Virginia, US

- U.S. National Register of Historic Places
- Virginia Landmarks Register
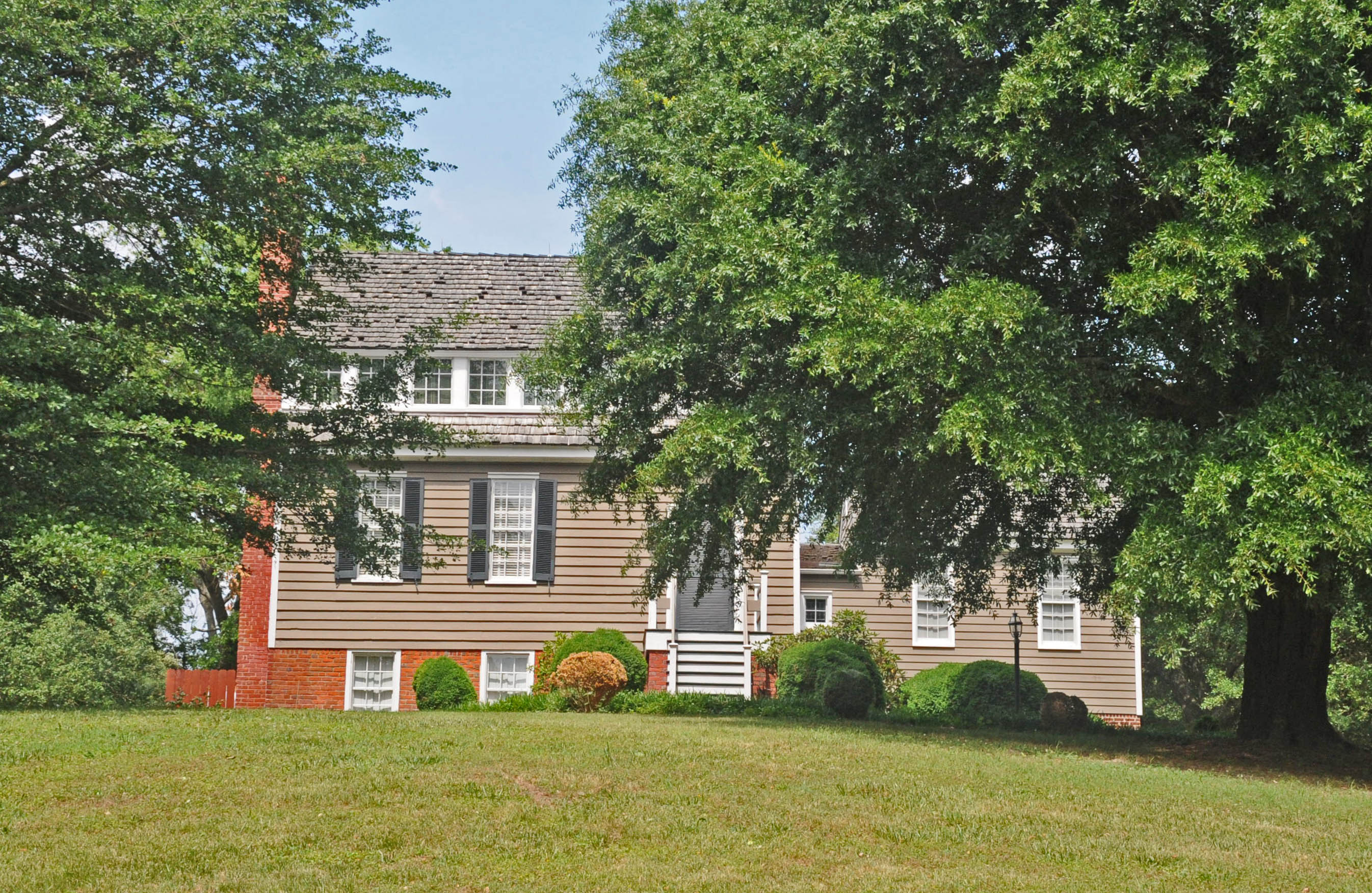
- View from the road

- Location within Virginia Location within the United States
- Location: 6353 Godwin Blvd., Suffolk, Virginia
- Coordinates: 36°52′40″N 76°35′3″W
- Area: 6.5 acres (2.6 ha)
- Built: c. 1820, 1848
- Architectural style: Federal, Clerestory House
- NRHP reference No.: 98001318
- VLR No.: 133-0695

Significant dates
- Added to NRHP: October 30, 1998
- Designated VLR: May 16, 2006

Phillips Farm, also known as Percy-Pitt Farm, is a historic home located at Suffolk, Virginia. The farm house was built about 1820, and is a 30-feet square, 1 1/2-story, frame house. It has an English basement, gable roof, and features clerestory dormer windows. In 1848, a 13 feet by 30 feet addition was added to the west of the original structure. It is one of a few regional examples of a building commonly called a clerestory house or a clerestory dormer house.

It was added to the National Register of Historic Places in 1998.

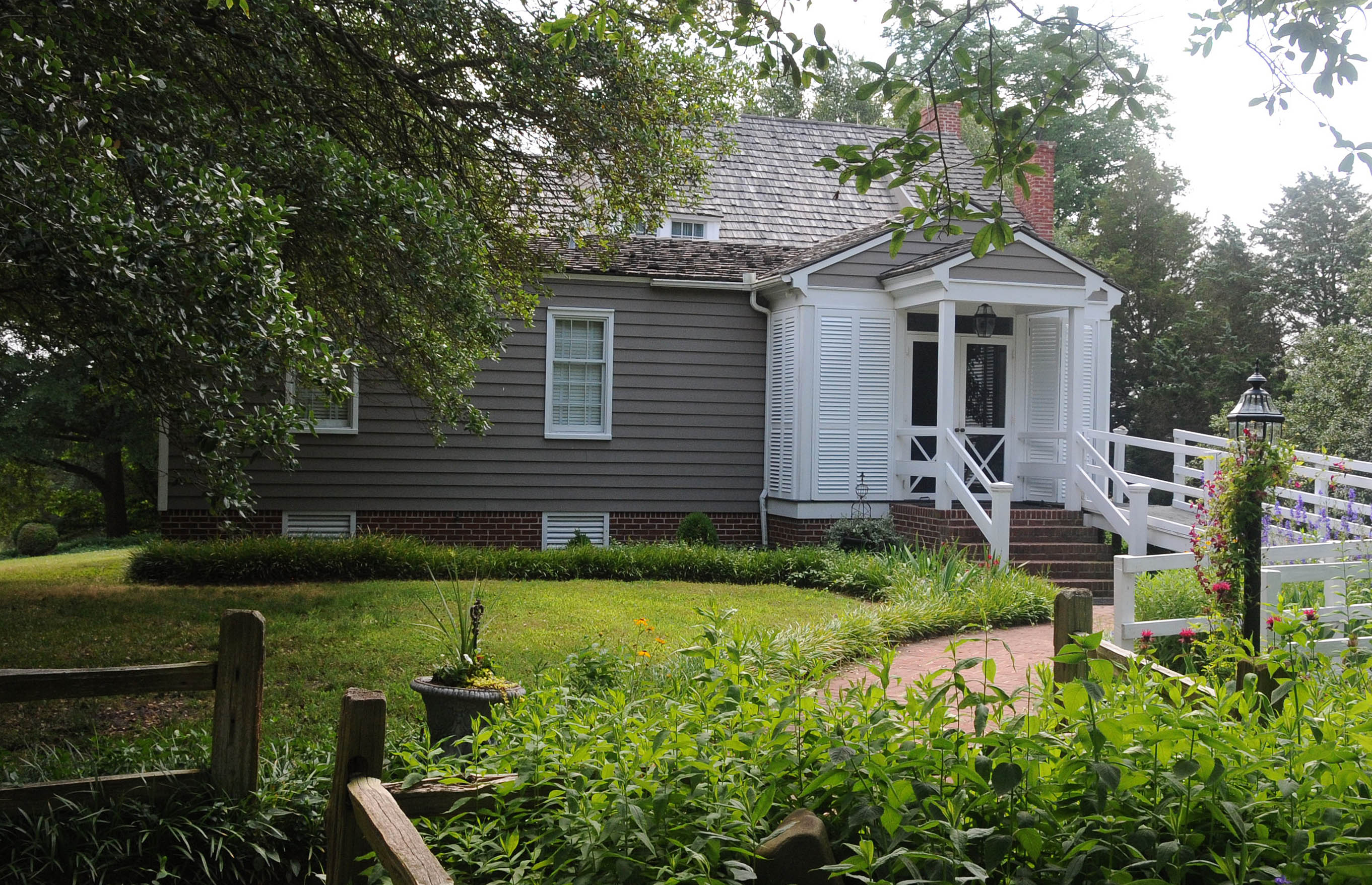
Rear of the house showing a clerestory dormer window
