= Glebe Church =

Historic church in Virginia, US

- U.S. National Register of Historic Places
- Virginia Landmarks Register
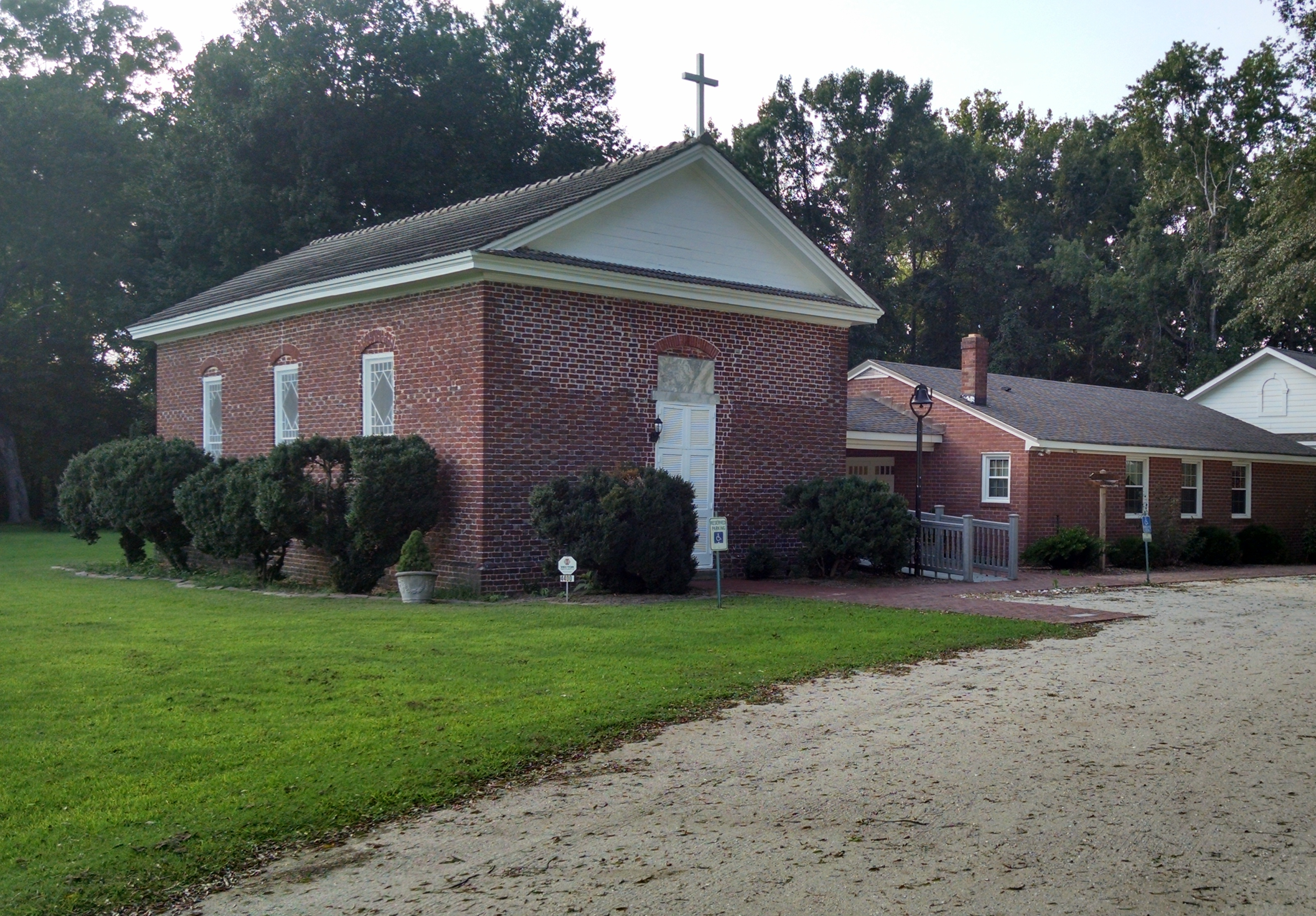

- Location within Virginia Location within the United States
- Location: W of Chesapeake City on VA 337, Driver, Virginia
- Coordinates: 36°49′29″N 76°29′49″W
- Area: 10 acres (4.0 ha)
- Built: 1737-1738
- NRHP reference No.: 73002148
- VLR No.: 133-0061

Significant dates
- Added to NRHP: May 25, 1973
- Designated VLR: September 19, 1972

Glebe Church (also known as Bennett's Creek Church) is a historic Anglican church in Driver, Virginia and its surrounding glebe. The church was built in 1737–1738, and is a rectangular, gable-roofed, brick church measuring 48 feet, 6 inches, by 25 feet, 4 inches. It was added to the National Register of Historic Places in 1973.
