= Amedeo Obici =

American businessman (1877–1947)

Amedeo Obici (July 15, 1877 – May 22, 1947) was an Italian-born American businessman and philanthropist who founded Planters.

== Early life ==
Obici was born in Oderzo in the Veneto region of Italy to Pietro Ludovico Obici and Luigia Carolina Sartori. His father died when Amedeo was seven years old, leaving behind his widow, young Amedeo, another son, Frank, and two daughters. In 1889, his mother's brother, Vittorio Sartori, invited him to come to the United States. The uncle, his wife and two children had earlier emigrated and lived in Scranton, Pennsylvania.

Amedeo was unable to speak English at the time. When he sailed across the Atlantic Ocean from Le Havre, France, in March 1889, his destination was written on a label tied through a buttonhole on his coat. Upon arrival in Brooklyn, New York, he rode a train to Scranton. En route, however, he was misdirected, and got off in Wilkes-Barre, Pennsylvania. The people in the train station took him to a fruit store owned by Enrico Musante and Enrico's daughter, Louise (whom he would later marry in 1916), as they too were Italian and could translate and assist.

While the Musantes worked to contact Amedeo's uncle in Scranton, Amedeo stayed with the Musantes in Wilkes-Barre. After staying with his uncle for a short time, he later returned to Wilkes-Barre, where he attended classes in the evening to learn English, and worked in the Musante fruit store.

== Career ==
When Amedeo returned to Wilkes-Barre and worked at the Musante fruit store, they had a peanut roaster and a fan that blew the fragrance of the roasting peanuts out to the street to lure customers to buy fruit and peanuts, which inspired him to get his own peanut cart. Because roaster ovens were expensive, Amadeo made a rudimentary roaster from parts obtained at a local scrapyard.

Amedeo saved his money, and was able to open his own fruit stand and get a proper peanut roaster To promote his peanut sales, Amedeo devised a promotion. He put one letter of his last name in each bag of peanuts, O, B, I, or C. He inserted only one letter "O" for every fifty bags, and the customers who got the bags with the letter "O" won a gold watch. The watch was an Ingersoll gold-colored watch, which he purchased for a dollar.

Obici operated an eating establishment that served oyster stew and roasted peanuts in a building in downtown Wilkes-Barre. There, in 1897, he teamed up with Mario Peruzzi, another Italian-American immigrant who was working for a wholesale grocer. Some time after Peruzzi's first wife died in 1910 (leaving two children), he married Obici's sister, "Lizzie".

Obici and Peruzzi founded Planters Peanut Company (unincorporated) in 1906 and incorporated it as Planters Nut and Chocolate Company in 1908. Planters owned four factories by 1930. Obici invented a new method of skinning and blanching peanuts so the roasted goobers came out clean. In 1913, they built a new processing plant in the heart of peanut farming territory in Suffolk, Virginia. Part of Obici's success was in marketing and finding new products to add to Planters' stock.

Dairy farming was an avocation for Amedeo. He had a prized herd of Guernsey cows, and distributed Bay Point Dairy Farm milk in Suffolk.

== Personal life ==
Amedeo saved his money, and in 1895, brought the rest of his family from Italy to the United States. In 1924, Amedeo and Louise Obici moved to Virginia from Scranton and purchased the 253 acre (1 km^{2}) Bay Point Farm located on a bluff overlooking the Nansemond River. Louise and Amedeo Obici were unable to have children of their own, but they frequently held events for children of the community at their Bay Point Farm. Louise's niece, also Louise Musante, lived with the Obicis from 1927 to 1930.

Louise Obici died in 1938. Amedeo wanted to create a lasting memorial for her and by 1941 had settled on a hospital, announcing the creation of the Amedeo Obici Hospital Foundation Trust. In 1942, he formed a corporation, which was funded by a large endowment presented after his death. Amedeo continued to live at Bay Point Farm until his death at age 69.

Obici died in Suffolk at the Bay Point Farm in 1947. The generosity of Louise and Amedeo Obici to their adopted community and his workers left a strong imprint in Suffolk and the surrounding community.

== Legacy ==
Among Amedeo Obici's legacy in the Suffolk and surrounding community was the original Louise Obici Memorial Hospital on Main Street U.S. Route 460. The hospital was established by his brother-in-law Mario Peruzzi after Obici's death, using the funds Obici had left him for that purpose. The community landmark, dedicated to Amedeo's wife Louise, opened in 1951. Through his estate, Obici also planned and paid for another hospital in his original hometown of Oderzo in Italy.

In 2002, a newer facility replaced the 1951-era Louise Obici Memorial Hospital at a larger site on Godwin Boulevard State Route 10. Obici Hospital is now affiliated with Sentara Healthcare which operates many health care facilities in southeastern Virginia. Another hospital was opened in southern Virginia with the Obici name in 2011. The old hospital site has been redeveloped and turned into a mixed use development with condominiums and retail shops, with the street and property still bearing Louise's name.

Although area has been reduced through sale, Bay Point Farm still includes the Obicis' home overlooking the Nansemond River and some of the outbuildings, and currently belongs to the City of Suffolk. The area is now known as Sleepy Hole Golf Course, and the Obici house has recently been renovated. Bay Point Farm is listed on the Virginia Landmarks Register and on the National Register of Historic Places.

Although Planters and the peanut industry are not the major defining activity of Suffolk as they once were, the Mr. Peanut character has become quite famous. A statue of the mascot is prominently displayed in downtown Suffolk. Another was a gift to Suffolk's sister city, Oderzo. The Planters Nut and Chocolate Company, now known simply as Planters, is owned by Hormel since June 2021. It is the Suffolk area's eleventh largest employer.
