= West End Historic District (Suffolk, Virginia) =

Historic district in Virginia, United States

- U.S. National Register of Historic Places
- U.S. Historic district
- Virginia Landmarks Register
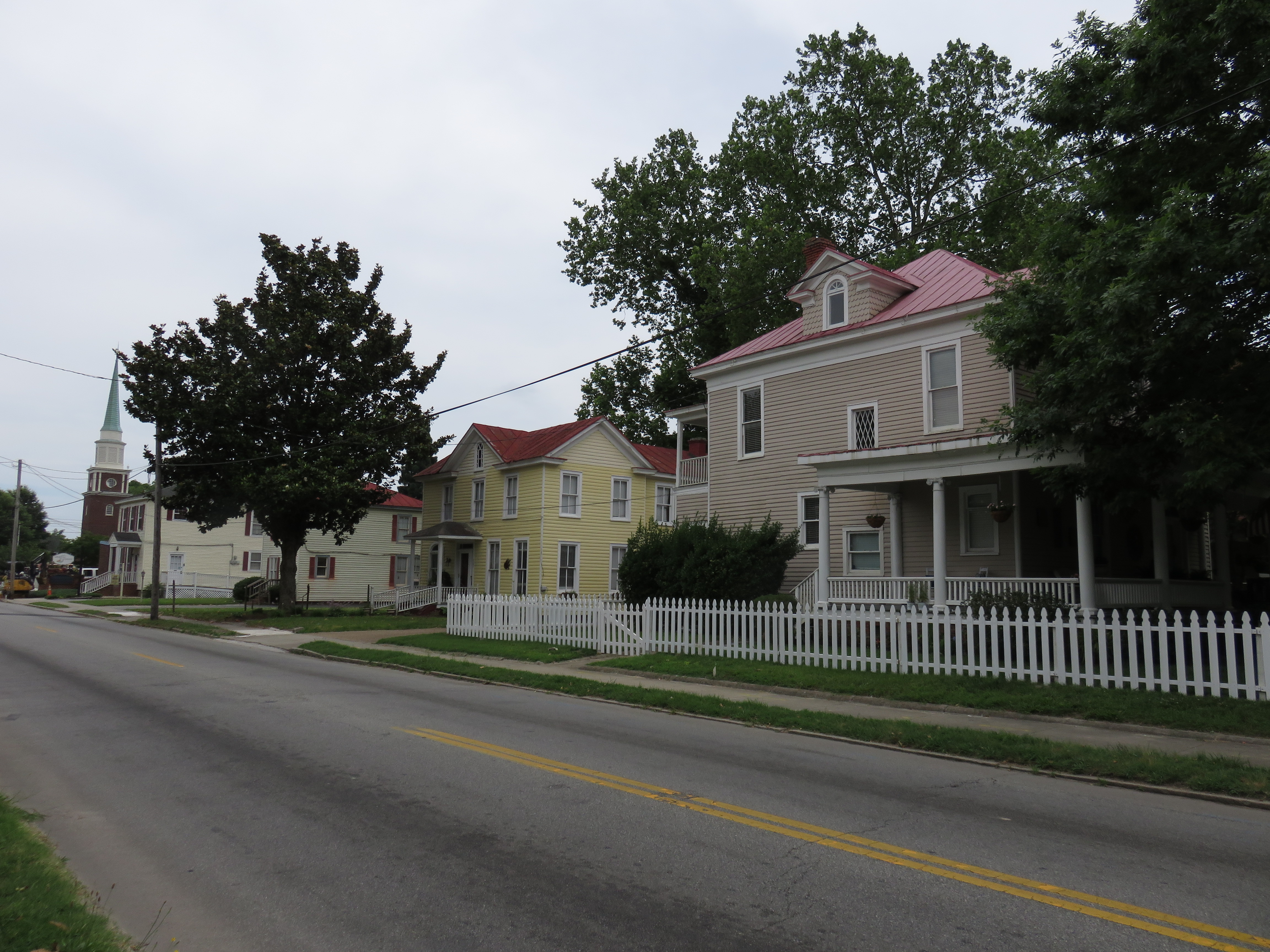
- Part of the district along Washington Street in 2016

- Location within Virginia Location within the United States
- Location: Roughly bounded by Causey Ave., Seaboard Coast Lines RR tracks, Pender St., Wellons St., Linden Ave., and RR tracks; Roughly bounded by Wellons, Washington & Smith Sts., Suffolk, Virginia
- Coordinates: 36°43′44″N 76°35′37″W
- Area: 76.3 acres (30.9 ha)
- Built: c. 1865
- Architectural style: Late Victorian, Late 19th And 20th Century Revivals, Queen Anne
- NRHP reference No.: 03001433, 04001277 (Boundary Increase)
- VLR No.: 133-5040

Significant dates
- Added to NRHP: January 16, 2004, November 27, 2004 (Boundary Increase)
- Designated VLR: September 10, 2003, September 8, 2004

West End Historic District is a national historic district located at Suffolk, Virginia. The district encompasses 201 contributing buildings and 93 contributing structures in a primarily residential section of the city of Suffolk. The district includes buildings dating from the last decade of the 19th century through the first four decades of the 20th century in a variety of popular architectural styles including Queen Anne and Folk Victorian. The residences were developed to support the growing upper-, middle-, and working-class populations. Notable buildings include the A.T. Holland House, J. C. Causey, Jr. House, Oxford United Methodist Church (1922), and West End Baptist Church (1938).

It was added to the National Register of Historic Places in 2003, with a boundary increase in 2004.
