= Joel E. Harrell and Son =

Historic factory in Virginia, US

- U.S. National Register of Historic Places
- Virginia Landmarks Register
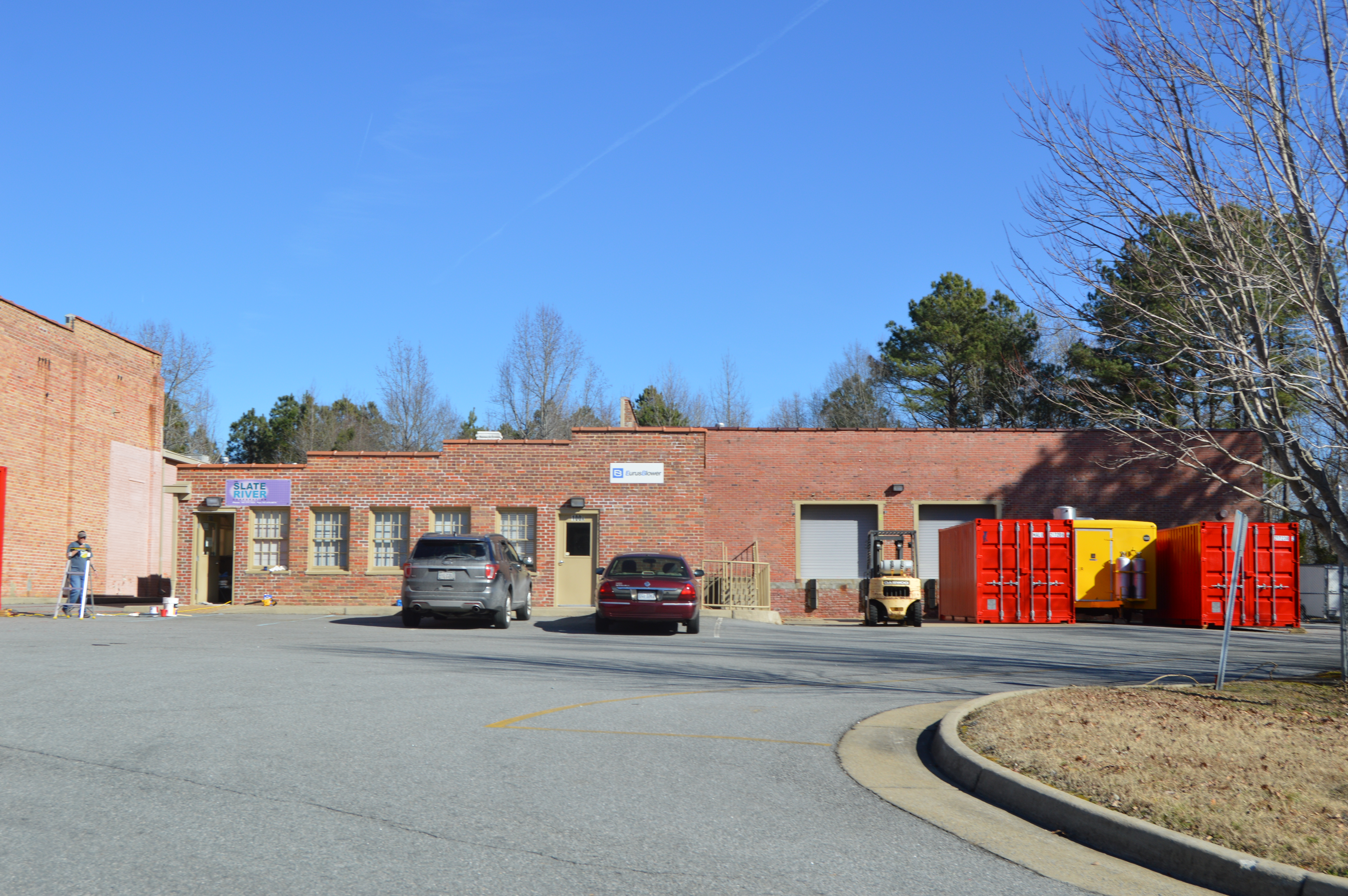
- Office building

- Location within Virginia Location within the United States
- Location: 110 Virginia Ham Dr., Suffolk, Virginia
- Coordinates: 36°44′40″N 76°33′31″W
- Area: 5.7 acres (2.3 ha)
- Built: 1941
- Architect: Cincinnati Butcher's Supply Co.
- NRHP reference No.: 05001580
- VLR No.: 133-5138

Significant dates
- Added to NRHP: February 1, 2006
- Designated VLR: December 7, 2005

Joel E. Harrell and Son is a historic pork processing factory complex located at Suffolk, Virginia. It was built in 1941, and consists of the office building and the main building. The office building is a one-story, seven bay by six bay, brick building. The main building was constructed to house all phases of the production process, including the slaughterhouse, curing rooms, and coolers. It is a one-story, brick building enlarged in 1946, 1955, and the 1970s. The main building was damaged by fire in 2005. The complex is representative of a small family-based pork processing facility.

It was added to the National Register of Historic Places in 2006.
