= Mt. Sinai Baptist Church (Suffolk, Virginia) =

Historic church in Virginia, US

- Mount Sinai Baptist Church
- U.S. National Register of Historic Places
- Virginia Landmarks Register
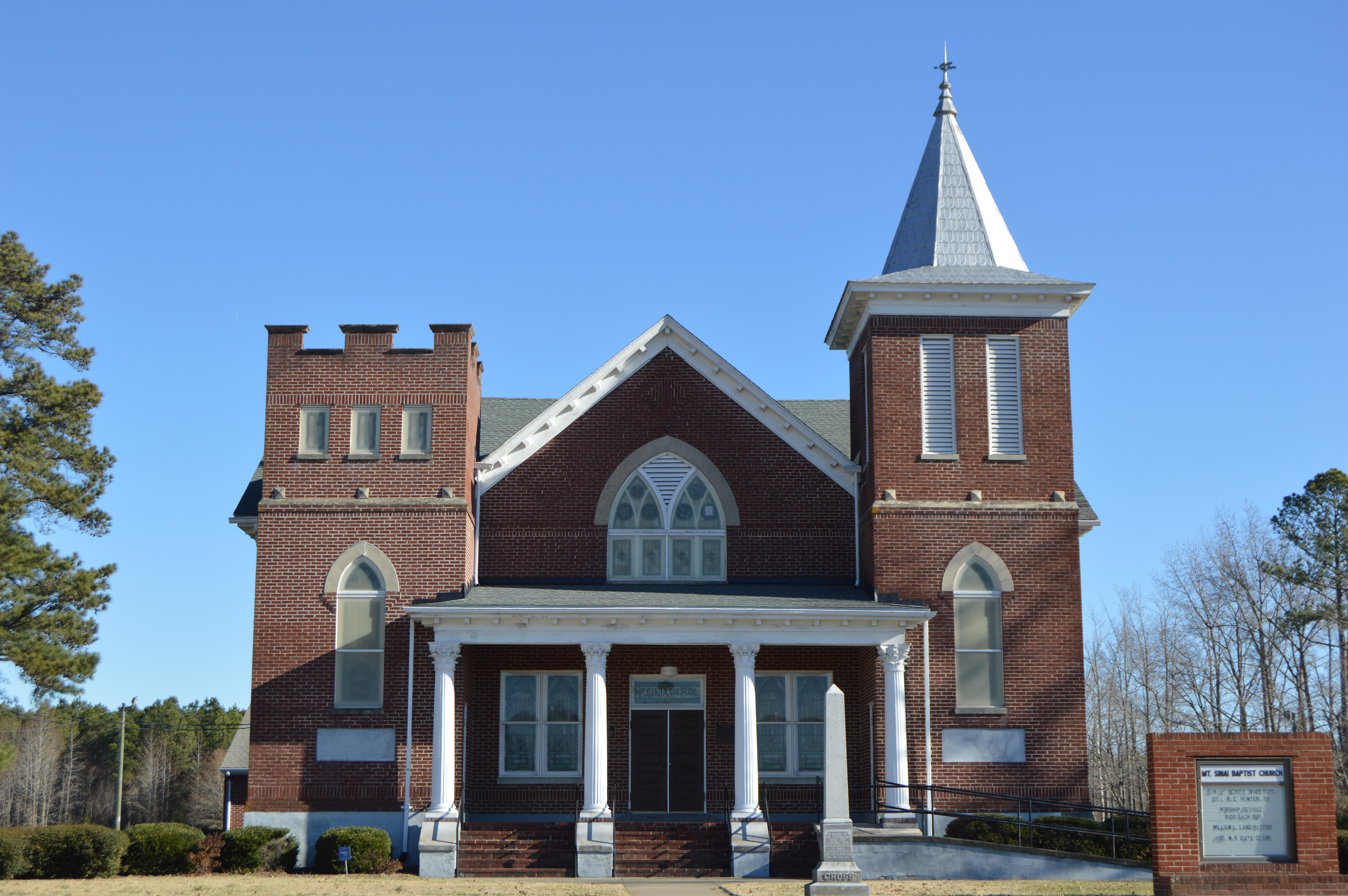
- Front of the church

- Location within Virginia Location within the United States
- Location: 6100 Holy Neck Rd., Suffolk, Virginia
- Coordinates: 36°38′21″N 76°49′46″W
- Area: 3 acres (1.2 ha)
- Built: 1920, 1921
- Architect: Richard H. Riedel
- Architectural style: Gothic
- NRHP reference No.: 07000193
- VLR No.: 133-5249

Significant dates
- Added to NRHP: March 20, 2007
- Designated VLR: September 6, 2006

Mount Sinai Baptist Church, also known as Mount Sinai Baptist Church and Cemetery, is a historic African-American Baptist church and cemetery located at 6100 Holy Neck Road in Suffolk, Virginia. It was built in 1921 by members of the church who were brick masons in the Victorian Gothic Revival style. It features a two towered façade, pointed Gothic-arched windows of stained glass imported from Germany, and prominent Classical porch. The church replaced a frame church erected in 1881. Associated with the church is a cemetery established about 1920.

It was added to the National Register of Historic Places in 2007.
