= List of museums in Virginia =

This list of museums in Virginia, United States, contains museums which are defined for this context as institutions (including nonprofit organizations, government entities, and private businesses) that collect and care for objects of cultural, artistic, scientific, or historical interest and make their collections or related exhibits available for public viewing. Museums that exist only in cyberspace (i.e., virtual museums) are not included.

This is a sortable list. Click on the small boxes next to any heading title to reorder the list (in alphabetical order or reverse alphabetical order) by that category.

== Museums ==
Name	Location	County or City	Region	Type	Summary
1750 Isle of Wight Courthouse	Smithfield	Isle of Wight	Tidewater/Hampton Roads	History	Restored 1750 county courthouse
116th Infantry Regiment and Foundation Museum	Verona	Augusta	Shenandoah Valley	Military	website, history of the 116th Infantry Regiment, a unit of the Virginia Army National Guard
A.A.F. Tank Museum	Danville	Danville	Southern	Military	website, international tank and cavalry artifacts
Abby Aldrich Rockefeller Folk Art Museum	Williamsburg	Williamsburg	Tidewater/Hampton Roads	Art	Folk art and furniture, based on Abby Aldrich Rockefeller's donations of folk art objects, one of Colonial Williamsburg's attractions
Abram's Delight Museum	Winchester	Winchester	Shenandoah Valley	Historic house	18th-century house, also 18th-century Valley Cabin located on the grounds
Accomac Debtors' Prison	Accomac	Accomack	Eastern Shore	History	Open by appointment
Accomack-Northampton Antique Car Museum	Parksley	Accomack	Eastern Shore	Transportation - Automotive	
Adam Thoroughgood House	Virginia Beach	Virginia Beach	Tidewater/Hampton Roads	Historic house	17th-century modified hall & parlor house with quaint English cottage architecture & herb & flower gardens.
Afro-American Historical Association of Fauquier County	The Plains	Fauquier	Northern	African American	website, includes a museum, reference, and research library pertaining to the African American way of life.
Agecroft Hall	Richmond	Richmond	Central	Historic house	17th-century period Tudor manor house
Air Power Park	Hampton	Hampton	Tidewater/Hampton Roads	Aviation	Outdoor aircraft and rocket park with museum of aircraft models and artifacts
Albemarle Charlottesville Historical Society Museum	Charlottesville	Albemarle	Central	Local history	website
Albert and Shirley Small Special Collections Library	Charlottesville	Albemarle	Central	Library	Changing exhibits of history, art, culture and more from its collections
Aldie Mill	Aldie	Loudoun	Northern	Mill	Restored early 19th-century watermill
Alexandria Archaeology Museum	Alexandria	Alexandria	Northern	Archaeology	website, city's archaeological history, how archaeologists work
Alexandria Black History Museum	Alexandria	Alexandria	Northern	African American	website
Amazement Square	Lynchburg	Lynchburg	Central	Children's	website
Amherst County Museum and Historical Society	Amherst	Amherst	Central	Local history	website, located in the Kearfott-Wood House
American Celebration on Parade	New Market	Shenandoah	Shenandoah Valley	Parade floats	Part of Shenandoah Caverns, collection of parade floats, props, & stage settings from American entertainment & political history
American Civil War Center at Historic Tredegar	Richmond	Richmond	Central	Civil War	Located at Tredegar Iron Works, interprets the Civil War from Union, Confederate, and African American perspectives
American Revolution Museum at Yorktown	Yorktown	York	Tidewater/Hampton Roads	Living	website, America's evolution from colonial status to nationhood, includes re-created Continental Army encampment and Revolution-era farm (used to be Yorktown Victory Center)
Andrew Johnston House	Pearisburg	Giles	Blue Ridge Highlands	Open-air	Complex of historic house, doctor's office & historical museum, operated by the Giles County Historical Society
Anne Spencer House	Lynchburg	Lynchburg	Central	Historic house	Home of Anne Spencer, a poet of the Harlem Renaissance
Antique Fire Engine Museum	Staunton	Staunton	Shenandoah Valley	Firefighting	Antique fire engine, located in the fire station
Appomattox County Historical Museum	Appomattox	Appomattox	Central	Local history	Operated by the Appomattox County Historical Society, located in the New Appomattox Court House
Appomattox Court House National Historical Park	Appomattox	Appomattox	Central	Civil War	Civil War battle site and location of the surrender of the Army of Northern Virginia, preserves village of original and reconstructed nineteenth century buildings
Arlington Historical Museum	Arlington	Arlington	Northern	Local history	Owned and operated by the Arlington Historical Society
Arlington House, The Robert E. Lee Memorial	Arlington	Arlington	Northern	Civil War	Honors Robert E. Lee's military and public leadership in pre- and post-Civil War America, includes 19th-century house, museum and enslaved quarters
Armstead Tasker Johnson High School Museum	Montross	Westmoreland	Tidewater/Hampton Roads	African American	History & legacy of education for African American students in the Northern Neck of Virginia
Arts Center @ 319	Smithfield	Isle of Wight	Tidewater/Hampton Roads	Art	website
Arts Depot	Abingdon	Washington	Blue Ridge Highlands	Art	website, non-profit, community-based art gallery
Athenaeum	Alexandria	Alexandria	Northern	Art	Home to the Northern Virginia Fine Arts Association, art exhibitions and galleries
Atlantic Wildfowl Heritage Museum	Virginia Beach	Virginia Beach	Tidewater/Hampton Roads	Art	Dedicated to wildfowl & located in the 19th-century DeWitt Cottage, features displays on decoys & carvers
Augusta Military Academy Museum	Fort Defiance	Augusta	Shenandoah Valley	Military	Website, history of the Augusta Military Academy
Aviation Historical Park	Virginia Beach	Virginia Beach	Tidewater/Hampton Roads	Aviation	Outdoor display of military aircraft, open for visitors on a tour of Naval Air Station Oceana
Avoca Museum	Altavista	Campbell	Central	Historic house	Victorian period house
Bacon's Castle	Surry	Surry	Tidewater/Hampton Roads	Historic house	Also known as "Allen's Brick House" or the "Arthur Allen House", owned and managed by Preservation Virginia
Ball-Sellers House	Arlington	Arlington	Northern	Historic house	Owned and operated by the Arlington Historical Society, 18th-century house
Balthis House	Front Royal	Warren	Shenandoah Valley	Historic house	19th-century house, operated by the Warren Heritage Society
Barrier Islands Center	Machipongo	Northampton	Eastern Shore	Local history	Artifacts & exhibits on the Barrier Islands with a look at the hearty people who endured & overcame difficult conditions living there, housed on the former site of the Almshouse Farm
Bassett Hall	Williamsburg	Williamsburg	Tidewater/Hampton Roads	Historic house	Part of Colonial Williamsburg
Bassett Historical Center	Bassett	Henry	Southern	Local history	website
Bath County Historical Society Museum	Warm Springs	Bath	Shenandoah Valley	Local history	website
Bedford Museum	Bedford	Bedford	Central	Local history	website
Belle Air Plantation	Charles City	Charles City	Tidewater/Hampton Roads	Historic house	
Belle Boyd Cottage	Front Royal	Warren	Shenandoah Valley	Historic house	website, operated by the Warren Heritage Society, 19th-century hotel associated with Civil War spy Belle Boyd
Belle Grove Plantation	Middletown	Frederick	Shenandoah Valley	Historic house	
Ben Lomond	Manassas	Prince William	Northern	Civil War	Civil War-period house used as a hospital after both battles of Manassas
Berkeley Plantation	Charles City	Charles City	Tidewater/Hampton Roads	Historic house	
Beth Ahabah Museum & Archives	Richmond	Richmond	Central	Religious - Jewish	Richmond and Southern Jewish experience
Big Otter Mill	Bedford	Bedford	Central	Mill	18th-century saw and grist mill
Birthplace of Country Music Museum	Bristol	Bristol	Blue Ridge Highlands	Music	History of the 1927 Bristol Sessions, which recorded some of earliest country music in America
Black Heritage Museum of Arlington	Arlington	Arlington	Northern	African American	website, planned museum, currently only virtual
Black History Museum and Cultural Center of Virginia	Richmond	Richmond	Central	African American	website: history of museum & link to address of the former First Battalion Virginia Volunteers Armory
Blacksburg Museum	Blacksburg	Montgomery	Blue Ridge Highlands	Local history	Includes the Alexander Black House & Cultural Center and the Odd Fellows Hall
Blandford Church	Petersburg	Petersburg	Central	Civil War	Civil-War era telegraph station and field hospital, later Confederate memorial chapel with Tiffany windows
Blue Ridge Farm Museum	Ferrum	Franklin	Blue Ridge Highlands	Living	website, part of Ferrum College and Blue Ridge Institute & Museum, re-created Virginia-German farmstead
Blue Ridge Institute & Museum	Ferrum	Franklin	Blue Ridge Highlands	Culture	website, part of Ferrum College, regional folk music, crafts, customs, material culture, folk art
Blue Ridge Music Center	Galax	Grayson	Blue Ridge Highlands	Music	Includes the Roots of American Music exhibition
Booker T. Washington National Monument	Hardy	Franklin	Blue Ridge Highlands	Biographical	Plantation where Booker T. Washington was born a slave
Botetourt County Historical Museum	Fincastle	Botetourt	Shenandoah Valley	Local history	website
Boyd Tavern	Boydton	Mecklenburg	Southern	History	19th-century tavern open for tours
Boykin's Tavern	Isle of Wight	Isle of Wight	Tidewater/Hampton Roads	Historic house	Historic 19th-century period tavern
Branch Museum of Architecture and Design	Richmond	Richmond	Central	Architecture	Exhibits of architecture and design, tours of the early 20th-century Tudor Revival house
Breneman-Turner Mill	Harrisonburg	Rockingham	Shenandoah Valley	Mill	19th-century grist mill
Brentsville Courthouse Historic Centre	Brentsville	Prince William	Northern	Open-air	Operated by the County, includes the restore 1825-era courthouse, Union Church and 1853 Haislip-Hall House
Bridgewater Historical Society Museum	Bridgewater	Rockingham	Shenandoah Valley	Local history	website
Bruce A. Elder Antique and Classic Automobiles	Staunton	Staunton	Shenandoah Valley	Transportation - Automobiles	Car dealer with auto museum open on Fridays and Saturdays
Brunswick County Museum	Lawrenceville	Brunswick	Southern	Local history	
Burwell-Morgan Mill	Millwood	Clarke	Shenandoah Valley	Mill	Operated by the Clarke County Historical Association, restored late 18th-century grist mill and 4-acre park
Cambria Depot Museum	Christiansburg	Montgomery	Blue Ridge Highlands	Railroad	
Camera Heritage Museum	Staunton	Staunton	Shenandoah Valley	Photography	website, collection of cameras, equipment, accessories and photographs
Campbell House (Lexington, Virginia)	Lexington	Lexington	Shenandoah Valley	Local history	website, home of the Rockbridge Historical Society
Canal Basin Square	Scottsville	Albemarle	Central	Transportation	website, outdoor transportation history park
Cape Charles Museum and Welcome Center	Cape Charles	Northampton	Eastern Shore	Local history	
Cape Henry Lighthouse	Virginia Beach	Virginia Beach	Tidewater/Hampton Roads	Maritime	Owned and managed by Preservation Virginia
Carlyle House	Alexandria	Alexandria	Northern	Historic house	
Carroll County Historical Society Museum	Hillsville	Carroll	Blue Ridge Highlands	Local history	Located in the former county courthouse
Carter Family Fold	Hiltons	Scott	Heart of Appalachia	Music	Includes the A.P. Carter Museum about the Carter Family
Cathedral of the Sacred Heart	Richmond	Richmond	Central	Religious	Early 20th-century cathedral, includes museum of the history of the Diocese of Richmond in the understory
Cedar Creek and Belle Grove National Historical Park	Middletown	Frederick	Shenandoah Valley	Civil War	1864 Battle of Cedar Creek Battlefield and Manor House used as a Confederate Headquarters
Center for the Arts at the Candy Factory	Manassas	Manassas	Northern	Multiple	website, art gallery, theater and history exhibits about the former candy factory
Central High Museum	Charlotte Court House	Charlotte	Southern	African-American	website, former African-American high school
Centre Hill Museum	Petersburg	Petersburg	Central	Historic house	Greek Revival mansion with exhibits on history of Petersburg
Charles Taylor Arts Center	Hampton	Hampton	Tidewater/Hampton Roads	Art	website, visual arts center, presents eight changing exhibitions each year
Chatham Manor	Fredericksburg	Fredericksburg	Northern	Civil War	Part of Fredericksburg and Spotsylvania National Military Park
Cherry Hill Farmhouse	Falls Church	Falls Church	Northern	Historic house	1845 Greek-revival house with authentic 18th- and 19th-century furniture and period tools in the 1856 barn
Chesterfield Museum	Chesterfield	Chesterfield	Central	Local history	website, operated by the Chesterfield Historical Society of Virginia
Children's Museum of Richmond	Richmond	Richmond	Central	Children's	
Children's Museum of Virginia	Portsmouth	Portsmouth	Tidewater/Hampton Roads	Children's	
Children's Science Center Lab	Fairfax	Fairfax	Northern Virginia	Children's	website, Northern Virginia's first interactive museum where children, families and school groups can explore science, technology, engineering, and mathematics (STEM) concepts through fun, engaging hands-on exhibits, activities and programs.
Chimborazo Medical Museum	Richmond	Richmond	Central	Civil War	Located at the Richmond Visitor Center of Richmond National Battlefield Park
Chippokes Farm & Forestry Museum	Surry	Surry	Tidewater/Hampton Roads	Agriculture	Located in Chippokes Plantation State Park
Christ Church (Lancaster County, Virginia)	Irvington	Lancaster	Chesapeake Bay	Historic church	National Historic Landmark Colonial-era church
Christiansburg Institute	Christiansburg	Montgomery	Blue Ridge Highlands	Local history	Includes Smokehouse Museum of the Institute's history, open by appointment
Chrysler Museum of Art	Norfolk	Norfolk	Tidewater/Hampton Roads	Art	Extensive collections includes European and American paintings and sculpture, glass, modern and contemporary art, decorative art, photography, Egyptian, Greco-Roman, Islamic, East Asian, African and Pre-Columbian material
CIA Museum	Langley	Fairfax	Northern	Espionage	Not open to the public
City Point History Museum	Hopewell	Hopewell	Central	Local history	website, includes exhibit of Hopewell China
Civil War Museum at Exchange Hotel	Gordonsville	Orange	Central	Civil War	Hotel used as a receiving hospital during the Civil War
Clarke County Historical Association Museum	Berryville	Clarke	Shenandoah Valley	Local history	website
Clarke-Palmore House	Henrico	Henrico	Central	Historic house	1930s period farmhouse, open by appointment and for events
Clarksville Regional Museum	Clarksville	Mecklenburg	Southern	Local history	website
Cleveland Virginia History and Heritage Museum	Cleveland	Russell	Heart of Appalachia	Local history	Located at the old Cleveland Elementary School, open by appointment
Clover Hill Village	Appomattox	Appomattox	Central	Living	Operated by the Appomattox County Historical Society, 6-acre living history village
C&O Railway Heritage Center	Clifton Forge	Alleghany	Shenandoah Valley	Railway	website, operated by the Chesapeake and Ohio Historical Society, equipment and artifacts of the Chesapeake and Ohio Railway
Cold War Museum	Warrenton	Fauquier	Northern	Military	Cold War history and artifacts
Colonial National Historical Park	Various locations		Tidewater/Hampton Roads	History	23-mile (37 km) parkway linking Historic Jamestowne, Yorktown National Battlefield, Cape Henry Memorial
Colonial Williamsburg	Williamsburg	Williamsburg	Tidewater/Hampton Roads	Living	Interpretation of a colonial-American city, includes Governor's Palace, Bassett Hall, Peyton Randolph House, Wythe House, Abby Aldrich Rockefeller Folk Art Museum, DeWitt Wallace Decorative Arts Museum
Colvin Run Mill	Great Falls	Fairfax	Northern	Mill	Restored operational 19th-century water-powered mill
Crab Orchard Museum and Pioneer Park	Tazewell	Tazewell	Heart of Appalachia	Open-air	website, history, natural history, Native Americans, pioneer life in 15 reconstructed buildings
Craig County Historical Society Museum	New Castle	Craig	Shenandoah Valley	Local history	Located in the Old Brick Hotel
Crewe Railroad Museum	Crewe	Nottoway	Northern	Railway	
Custom House	Yorktown	York	Tidewater/Hampton Roads	History	Operated by the Comte de Grasse Chapter Daughters of the American Revolution, early 18th-century custom house, open on Sundays from June to October
Cyrus McCormick Farm	Steeles Tavern	Rockbridge	Shenandoah Valley	Agriculture	
Dabbs House	Henrico	Henrico	Central	Civil War	website, operated by the County, served as General Robert E. Lee's field headquarters during the summer of 1862 and as Henrico's police headquarters from 1941-2005
Dante Coal Mining and Railroad Museum	Dante	Russell	Heart of Appalachia	Local history	website, local history, artifacts of coal mining and railroad life and work
Danville Museum of Fine Arts and History	Danville	Danville	Southern	Multiple	Art, Civil War artifacts, local history, located in the William T Sutherlin Mansion
Danville Science Center	Danville	Danville	Southern	Science	Hands-on science displays, natural history exhibits
Daura Gallery	Lynchburg	Lynchburg	Central	Art	website, part of the University of Lynchburg, located in the Dillard Fine Arts Center
D. C. Wysor Observatory and Museum	Dublin	Pulaski	Blue Ridge Highlands	Geology	Observatory and geology and astronomy museum, located on the grounds of Dublin Elementary School
DEA Museum	Arlington	Arlington	Northern	Law enforcement	History of the Drug Enforcement Administration and the impact of drug addiction from past to present
Deltaville Maritime Museum	Deltaville	Middlesex	Chesapeake Bay	Maritime	website, museum and Holly Point Nature Park encompass over 30 acres (120,000 m^{2}) and include two houses, many outbuildings, three docks, and a small boat launching area
Depot Gallery	Richmond	Richmond	Central	Art	Student gallery for the VCU School of the Arts
DeWitt Wallace Decorative Arts Museum	Williamsburg	Williamsburg	Tidewater/Hampton Roads	Decorative art	One of Colonial Williamsburg's attractions, 17th- to 19th-century American and British furniture, metals, ceramics, glass, paintings, prints, firearms and textiles
Dinwiddie County Museum	Dinwiddie	Dinwiddie	Central	Local history	Operated by the Dinwiddie County Historical Society
Dr. Phipps Family Museum	Clintwood	Dickenson	Heart of Appalachia	Medical	Medical memorabilia from the Old Dickenson County Hospital, located inside the visitor center
Drakes Branch Museum	Drakes Branch	Charlotte	Southern	Local history	website
Eastern Shore Railway Museum	Parksley	Accomack	Eastern Shore	Railway	
Edith Bolling Wilson Birthplace Museum	Wytheville	Wythe	Blue Ridge Highlands	Historic house	website, birthplace of Edith Wilson
Eleanor D. Wilson Museum	Roanoke	Roanoke	Shenandoah Valley	Art	website, part of Hollins University, features the work of internationally renowned artists, emerging figures, and regional names
Elk Run Church Museum	Elk Run	Fauquier	Northern	Biographical	website, history and foundation of the 1750s Anglican church
Endview Plantation	Newport News	Newport News	Tidewater/Hampton Roads	Civil War	17th-century plantation, restored to 1862 appearance during the American Civil War
Essex County Museum	Tappahannock	Essex	Chesapeake Bay	Local history	website, operated by the Essex County Historical Society
Esther Thomas Atkinson Museum	Hampden-Sydney	Prince Edward	Central	Multiple	website, part of Hampden-Sydney College, history of the college, changing exhibits of local history, natural history, art
Explore More Discovery Museum	Harrisonburg	Rockingham	Shenandoah Valley	Children's	
Fairfax Museum	Fairfax	Fairfax	Northern	Local history	website, also houses the visitor center
Fairfax Station Railroad Museum	Fairfax Station	Fairfax	Northern	Railway	website, Civil War, railroading and local history
Farmers' Bank	Petersburg	Petersburg	Central	History	19th-century bank displays, houses the Petersburg Visitor Center
Fauquier History Museum at the Old Jail	Warrenton	Fauquier	Northern	Jail	Operated by the Fauquier Historical Society, local history displays and history of the two jails
Fayette Area Historical Initiative African American Museum (FAHI)	Martinsville	Henry	Southern	African American	website
The Fed Experience	Richmond	Richmond	Central	Money	website, located at the Federal Reserve Bank of Richmond, growth of living standards, the importance of price stability and the Fed's role in the economy
Ferguson Center for the Arts	Newport News	Newport News	Tidewater/Hampton Roads	Art	Performing arts center for Christopher Newport University, includes the Falk Gallery of Art and Ferguson Hall Gallery
Ferry Farm	Fredericksburg	Stafford	Northern	Presidential home	Boyhood home of George Washington
Ferry Plantation House	Virginia Beach	Virginia Beach	Tidewater/Hampton Roads	Historic house	Mid-19th-century period house
Fields-Penn House	Abingdon	Washington	Blue Ridge Highlands	Historic house	website, mid-19th-century period house
Flippo Gallery	Ashland	Hanover	Central	Art	website, art gallery of Randolph-Macon College in Pace-Armistead Hall, exhibition of contemporary works of art by professional artists
Fine Arts Museum of Gloucester	Gloucester	Gloucester	Chesapeake Bay	Art	Small fine arts museum run by the Cook Foundation. Exhibitions and programming offered to the public. Admission is free. Free parking https://www.fineartsmuseumofgloucester.org/
First Freedom Center	Richmond	Richmond	Central	Religious	Traces America's experience of religious liberty from its European antecedents through the present
Floyd County Historical Society Museum	Floyd	Floyd	Blue Ridge Highlands	Local history	website
Fort Harrison	Dayton	Rockingham	Shenandoah Valley	Historic house	Mid 18th-century Daniel Harrison House
Fort Monroe Casemate Museum	Hampton	Hampton	Tidewater/Hampton Roads	Military	History of the 19th-century fort; visitors can tour the exterior of the fort and its grounds
Fort Norfolk	Norfolk	Norfolk	Tidewater/Hampton Roads	Fort	Tour the 18th-century fort
Fort Ward Museum	Alexandria	Alexandria	Northern	Civil War	Preserved Union Army fort and museum
Fralin Museum of Art	Charlottesville	Albemarle	Central	Art	Part of the University of Virginia, collection includes African art, American Indian art, and European and American painting, photography, and works on paper
Francis Land House	Virginia Beach	Virginia Beach	Tidewater/Hampton Roads	Historic house	Early 19th-century period plantation house
Franconia Museum	Franconia	Fairfax	Northern	Local history	website
Franklin County Historical Society Museum	Rocky Mount	Franklin	Blue Ridge Highlands	Local history	website
Fredericksburg and Spotsylvania National Military Park	Fredericksburg	Fredericksburg	Northern	Civil War	
Fredericksburg Area Museum & Cultural Center	Fredericksburg	Fredericksburg	Northern	Local history	website, city and area history and culture, art exhibits
Freedom House Museum	Alexandria	Alexandria	Northern	African American	Operated by the Northern Virginia Urban League in a slave-trading depot, history of area slavery
Freeman Store and Museum	Vienna	Fairfax	Northern	Local history	Operated by Historic Vienna
Friendship Firehouse Museum	Alexandria	Alexandria	Northern	Firefighting	website
Frontier Culture Museum of Virginia	Staunton	Staunton	Shenandoah Valley	Living	Features 5 historic, reconstructed working farms from Germany (1710), Northern Ireland (1730), England (1690), Botetourt County, Virginia (1850), Rockingham County, Virginia (1773).
Gadsby's Tavern Museum	Alexandria	Alexandria	Northern	Tavern	
Gallery 5	Richmond	Richmond	Central	Art	Visual art gallery and performing arts center
Gargoyle Manor - The Monster Museum	Claudville	Patrick	Southern	Media	website, movie, literature, and folklore memorabilia about monsters
Gari Melchers Home	Falmouth	Stafford	Northern	Art	Home & studio of American artist Gari Melchers
George Washington Birthplace National Monument	Washington's Birthplace	Westmoreland	Chesapeake Bay	Presidential home	
George Washington Masonic National Memorial	Alexandria	Alexandria	Northern	Presidential memorial	Includes George Washington Museum, Masonic exhibits, a replica of the Alexandria-Washington Lodge room as it was in 1802, library and chapel
George Washington's Gristmill	Lorton	Fairfax	Northern	Mill	Operated by Mount Vernon, reconstructed 18th-century grist mill
George Washington's Office Museum	Winchester	Winchester	Shenandoah Valley	Military	website, history of George Washington's military career in the 1750s
Glencoe Museum	Radford	Pulaski	Blue Ridge Highlands	Multiple	Victorian-period historic house, exhibits of history of Southwest Virginia, gallery exhibits of contemporary Appalachian artists
Gloucester Museum of History	Gloucester	Gloucester	Chesapeake Bay	Local history	website
Goochland County Museum	Goochland	Goochland	Central	Local history	website, operated by the Goochland County Historical Society
Graffiti House	Brandy Station	Culpeper	Northern	Civil War	Mid 19th-century that is notable because of the Civil War era graffiti on many of the walls
Grand Lodge Library, Museum & Cultural Foundation	Richmond	Richmond	Central	Masonic	website, library and museum with Masonic artifacts representing Virginia Masonic history
Grant's Headquarters at City Point Museum	Hopewell	Hopewell	Central	Civil War	Unit of Petersburg National Battlefield
Grayson Crossroads Museum	Independence	Grayson	Blue Ridge Highlands	Local history	Part of the Historic 1908 Courthouse
Great Lakes to Florida Highway Museum	Wytheville	Wythe	Blue Ridge Highlands	Transportation	website, history of Route 21, located in a historic gas station
Greater Reston Arts Center	Reston	Fairfax	Northern	Art	website
Green Spring	Alexandria	Alexandria	Northern	Historic house	Late 18th-century house with art exhibits, located in Green Spring Gardens Park
Greene County Historical Society Museum	Stanardsville	Greene	Central	Local history	website
Gum Springs Museum	Alexandria	Alexandria	Northern	African American	website, operated by the Gum Springs Historical Society
Gunston Hall	Mason Neck	Fairfax	Northern	Historic house	18th-century mansion home of George Mason
Gwynn's Island Museum	Gwynn's Island	Mathews	Chesapeake Bay	Local history	website
Haller-Gibboney Rock House Museum	Wytheville	Wythe	Blue Ridge Highlands	Historic house	Period rooms reflect local life in the 19th and early 20th centuries
Hampton History Museum	Hampton	Hampton	Tidewater/Hampton Roads	Local history	website
Hampton Roads Naval Museum	Norfolk	Norfolk	Tidewater/Hampton Roads	Maritime	
Hampton University Museum	Hampton	Hampton	Tidewater/Hampton Roads	Art	website, over 9,000 objects including African American fine arts, traditional African, Native American, Native Hawaiian, Pacific Island, and Asian art, and objects relating to the history of Hampton University
Harmon's Museum	Woodlawn	Carroll	Blue Ridge Highlands	Local history	Civil War artifacts, early coal mine relics, antique military guns, pioneer tools, early folk music memorabilia, Indian artifacts of Southwestern Virginia, Hillsville Courthouse Tragedy of 1912
Harrison Museum of African American Culture	Roanoke	Roanoke	Shenandoah Valley	African American	website, art and history of African Americans in Roanoke Valley, African and contemporary art
Harrisonburg Fire Department Museum	Harrisonburg	Rockingham	Shenandoah Valley	Firefighting	website, located on the third floor of the Public Safety Building, includes uniforms, medals, equipment, fire alarms and photographs
Harry W. Meador Coal Museum	Big Stone Gap	Wise	Heart of Appalachia	Industry - coal	website
Haymarket Museum	Haymarket	Prince William	Northern	Local history	Located in the old town hall
Hazel Moon Resource Center	Appomattox	Appomattox	Central	Ethnic	Artifacts of Hazel Moon, long time missionary to Africa
Henricus Historical Park	Chester	Chesterfield	Central	Living	Re-creating the second successful English settlement in the New World
Heritage Museum	Dayton	Rockingham	Shenandoah Valley	Local history	website, home to the Harrisonburg Rockingham Historical Society
Heritage Farm Museum of Loudoun County	Loudoun	Loudon	Northern	Agriculture	website, agriculture history, working farm exhibits, general store, children's play area
Hermitage Foundation Museum and Gardens	Norfolk	Norfolk	Tidewater/Hampton Roads	Multiple	website, early 20th-century historic house museum with an art collection and contemporary exhibition galleries, surrounded by twelve acres of formal gardens and natural woodlands, educational wetlands, a visual arts school and a studio artists program
Herndon ArtSpace	Herndon	Fairfax	Northern	Art	Community art space and gallery
Herndon Depot Museum	Herndon	Fairfax	Northern	Railway	Operated by the Herndon Historical Society, railroad and local history displays
Highland	Charlottesville	Albemarle	Central	Presidential home	Early 19th-century estate of President James Monroe
Highland County Museum	McDowell	Highland	Shenandoah Valley	Local history	Operated by the Highland County Historical Society in the Mansion House
Hill House Museum	Portsmouth	Portsmouth	Tidewater/Hampton Roads	Historic house	website, 19th-century house with 19th and 20th century furniture and decorative items
Historic Blenheim	Fairfax	Fairfax	Northern	Historic house	Operated by the City, features over 120 signatures, art, games, thoughts, and poetry left on the house walls by Union soldiers during their occupation of the Fairfax Court House area
Historic Huntley	Hybla Valley	Fairfax	Northern	Historic house	Early 19th-century Federal-style villa and farm, operated by Fairfax County Park Authority
Historic Jamestown	Jamestown	James City	Tidewater/Hampton Roads	History	History and artifacts of the original site of the first permanent English settlement in North America
Historic Sandusky & Civil War Museum	Lynchburg	Lynchburg	Central	Civil War	Historic house with exhibits about the Civil War
Historic St. Luke's Church	Benns Church	Isle of Wight	Tidewater/Hampton Roads	Religious	Tours of the 17th-century church, its history, history of the Anglican church and Episcopal church in America
History Museum of Western Virginia	Roanoke	Roanoke	Shenandoah Valley	Local history	website
Holland Page Place	Palmyra	Fluvanna	Central	Historic house	website, post Civil War log cabin, operated by the Fluvanna County Historical Society
Hollingsworth Mill	Winchester	Winchester	Shenandoah Valley	Mill	website, 19th-century mill with exhibits by the Winchester-Frederick County Historical Society
Hostetter Museum of Natural History	Harrisonburg	Rockingham	Shenandoah Valley	Natural history	website, located in the Suter Science Center of Eastern Mennonite University
Housewright House	Buckingham	Buckingham	Central	Local history	website, owned and managed by Historic Buckingham
Hugh Mercer Apothecary	Fredericksburg	Fredericksburg	Northern	Medical	Owned and managed by Preservation Virginia
Hunt Gallery	Staunton	Staunton	Shenandoah Valley	Art	website, contemporary art gallery of Mary Baldwin University
Hunter House Victorian Museum	Norfolk	Norfolk	Tidewater/Hampton Roads	Historic house	Late Victorian period house and furnishings
Hupp's Hill Cedar Creek Museum	Strasburg	Shenandoah	Shenandoah Valley	Civil War	website, located in Hupp's Hill Civil War Park, history of the Battle of Cedar Creek; formerly the Stonewall Jackson Museum at Hupp's Hill
Ingles Ferry	Radford	Pulaski	Blue Ridge Highlands	Farm	Working farm with structures dating to the 1700s
Isle of Wight County Museum	Smithfield	Isle of Wight	Tidewater/Hampton Roads	Local history	
Ivy Lodge	Front Royal	Warren	Shenandoah Valley	Local history	website, headquarters of the Warren Heritage Society
James A. Fields House	Newport News	Newport News	Tidewater/Hampton Roads	Historic house	Home of James A. Fields. Associated with the development of the social and civic life of the African-American community in Newport News, open by appointment
James Madison Museum	Orange	Orange	Central	Presidential	Life of James and Dolley Madison, agriculture and transportation in their era
James Madison University Galleries	Harrisonburg	Rockingham	Shenandoah Valley	Art	Includes the Duke Hall Gallery of Fine Art, the Festival Conference and Student Center with the Lisanby Museum, Prism Gallery and Prism International Gallery, the New Image Gallery, and artWorks Gallery
James Madison University Mineral Museum	Harrisonburg	Rockingham	Shenandoah Valley	Natural history	website, over 550 crystal and gemstone specimens from around the world, located in Memorial Hall
James Monroe Museum & Memorial Library	Fredericksburg	Fredericksburg	Northern	Presidential	Administered by the University of Mary Washington, President James Monroe's law office, personal and family artifacts
Jamestown Settlement	Jamestown	James City	Tidewater/Hampton Roads	Living	
Jeff Matthews Memorial Museum	Galax	Grayson	Blue Ridge Highlands	Local history	website, includes historic cabins dating back to 1834, Victorian fashions, over 10,000 Native American artifacts, African items, hunting trophies and guns
Jerry Falwell Museum	Lynchburg	Lynchburg	Central	Biographical	website; part of Liberty University, life of Christian leader Jerry Falwell
JMU Meteorite Collection	Harrisonburg	Rockingham	Shenandoah Valley	Geology	website, located at James Madison University
John C. Wells Planetarium	Harrisonburg	Rockingham	Shenandoah Valley	Astronomy	Free public shows on Saturday
John Fox, Jr. Museum	Big Stone Gap	Wise	Heart of Appalachia	Biographical	Late 19th-century home of author John Fox, Jr.
John Marshall House	Richmond	Richmond	Central	Historic house	Owned and managed by Preservation Virginia
John Singleton Mosby Museum	Warrenton	Fauquier	Northern	Civil War	Not open currently
Josephine School Community Museum	Berryville	Clarke	Shenandoah Valley	African American	History of Clarke County's African-American community
June Tolliver House & Folk Art Center	Big Stone Gap	Wise	Heart of Appalachia	Historic house	
Kenmore Plantation	Fredericksburg	Fredericksburg	Northern	Historic house	Late 18th-century house of George Washington's sister
Ker Place Historical House Museum	Onancock	Accomack	Eastern Shore	History	Circa 1800 Federal style house museum, operated by the Eastern Shore of Virginia Historical Society
Kilmarnock Museum	Kilmarnock	Lancaster	Chesapeake Bay	Local history	
King and Queen Courthouse Tavern Museum	King and Queen Court House	King and Queen	Chesapeake Bay	Local history	website, operated by the King and Queen County Historical Society
King George County Historical Society Museum	King George	King George	Chesapeake Bay	Local history	website
King William Historical Museum	King William	King William	Tidewater/Hampton Roads	Local history	website
Kinsale Museum	Kinsale	Westmoreland	Chesapeake Bay	Local history	website, operated by the Kinsale Foundation
Kittiewan Plantation	New Hope	Charles City	Tidewater/Hampton Roads	Historic house	Administered by the Archeological Society of Virginia
Kluge-Ruhe Aboriginal Art Collection	Charlottesville	Albemarle	Central	Art	Part of the University of Virginia, indigenous Australian art
Langhorne House	Danville	Danville	Southern	Historic house	Birthplace of Nancy Astor, Viscountess Astor
L. E. Coleman African-American Museum	Halifax	Halifax	Southern	African American	website
University Chapel	Lexington	Lexington	Shenandoah Valley	History	Historic chapel with museum about the history of the Lee family and George Washington and Washington & Lee University
Lee-Fendall House	Alexandria	Alexandria	Northern	Historic house	
Lee Hall Depot	Newport News	Newport News	Tidewater/Hampton Roads	Railway	Late 19th century train station and museum of local and railroad history
Lee Hall Mansion	Newport News	Newport News	Tidewater/Hampton Roads	Civil War	Mid 19th-century period house, used as a headquarters for Confederate generals during the Peninsula Campaign of 1862
Legacy Museum of African American History	Lynchburg	Lynchburg	Central	African American	
Liberia Plantation	Manassas	Manassas	Northern	Historic house	Open for tours by appointment
Liberty Biblical Museum	Lynchburg	Lynchburg	Central	Religious	website; part of Liberty University, ancient artifacts from the Holy Land, rare Bibles and manuscripts
Liberty Heritage Society Museum	Warrenton	Fauquier	Northern	Local history	Open by appointment
Lightship Portsmouth	Portsmouth	Portsmouth	Tidewater/Hampton Roads	Maritime	1915 museum ship
Long Branch Plantation	Millwood	Clarke	Shenandoah Valley	Historic house	19th-century plantation home, displays about the history of the house and plantation, changing exhibits of local history
Longwood Center for the Visual Arts	Farmville	Prince Edward	Northern	Art	website, museum of Longwood University, collections include art by Virginia and American artists, folk art, decorative arts, contemporary, Chinese and African art
Loudoun Museum	Leesburg	Loudoun	Northern	Local history	website
Lovettsville Museum	Lovettsville	Loudoun	Northern	Local history	website, operated by the Lovettsville Historical Society
Luray Caverns	Luray	Page	Shenandoah Valley	Multiple	Show cave and attractions, including the Luray Valley Museum, Car and Carriage Caravan Museum and Toy Town Junction
Lyceum, Alexandria's History Museum	Alexandria	Alexandria	Northern	Local history	City history
Lynchburg Academy of Fine Arts	Lynchburg	Lynchburg	Central	Art	website, arts center, includes the Ann White Academy Gallery and Art Up Front, located in the Academy of Music
Lynchburg Museum	Lynchburg	Lynchburg	Central	Local history	City history, located in the old courthouse
Lynnhaven House	Virginia Beach	Virginia Beach	Tidewater/Hampton Roads	Historic house	Early 18th-century period house
MacArthur Memorial	Norfolk	Norfolk	Tidewater/Hampton Roads	Biographical	Tomb and museum about the life of General Douglas MacArthur
MacCallum More Museum & Gardens	Chase City	Mecklenburg	Southern	Local history	Exhibits includes Native American arrowheads and artifacts, local history, 5-acre garden
Madison County Historical Society Museum	Madison	Madison	Central	Local history	website
Maggie L. Walker National Historic Site	Richmond	Richmond	Central	Biographical	Life and work of Maggie L. Walker, the first woman to serve as president of a bank in the United States and her work for civil rights advancement, economic empowerment, and educational opportunities for Jim Crow-era African Americans and women
Magnolia Grange	Chesterfield	Chesterfield	Central	Historic house	Operated by the Chesterfield Historical Society of Virginia, 1820s period plantation house
Maier Museum of Art at Randolph College	Lynchburg	Lynchburg	Central	Art	Part of Randolph College, American art dating from the 19th and 20th centuries
Manassas Museum	Manassas	Manassas	Northern	Local history	website
Manassas National Battlefield Park	Manassas	Prince William	Northern	Civil War	
Manassas Railway Depot	Manassas	Manassas	Northern	Railroad	website, officially known as James & Marion Payne Memorial Railroad Heritage Gallery
Mariners' Museum	Newport News	Newport News	Tidewater/Hampton Roads	Maritime	
Marine Raider Museum	MCB Quantico	Prince William	Northern	Military	History of Marine Raiders
The Marshall House	Leesburg	Loudoun	Northern	Biographical	Also known as Gen. George C. Marshall House or Dodona Manor, restored 1950s-period home of soldier and statesman George Marshall
Martinsville-Henry County Heritage Center and Museum	Martinsville	Henry	Southern	Local history	website, operated by the Martinsville – Henry County Historical Society in the Historic Henry County Courthouse
Martinsville-Henry County Historical Museum	Martinsville	Henry	Southern	Local history	
Mary Ball Washington Museum and Library	Lancaster	Lancaster	Chesapeake Bay	Open-air	
Mary Washington House	Fredericksburg	Fredericksburg	Northern	Historic house	18th-century period house in which George Washington's mother, Mary Ball Washington, resided towards the end of her life
Matthews Living History Farm Museum	Galax	Grayson	Blue Ridge Highlands	Agriculture	website, early 20th-century period 21 acre working farm museum
Maymont	Richmond	Richmond	Central	Multiple	Historic mansion, carriage collection, arboretum and gardens, wildlife exhibits, children's farm and nature center
McCormick Observatory	Charlottesville	Albemarle	Central	Astronomy	Open during public nights, features museum about the history of astronomy
McGuffey Art Center	Charlottesville	Albemarle	Central	Art	website, artist association with three galleries
Meadow Farm Museum	Glen Allen	Henrico	Central	Living	1860 living historical farm and museum, operated by the Henrico County Parks & Recreation Department
Meadowbrook Museum	Shawsville	Montgomery	Blue Ridge Highlands	Local history	Branch of the Montgomery Museum
Menokin	Warsaw	Richmond	Chesapeake Bay	Historic house	Ruins of historic house, visitor center focuses on the history of the property and conservation efforts
Middlesex County Museum (Virginia)	Saluda	Middlesex	Chesapeake Bay	Local history	website
Miles B. Carpenter Folk Art Museum	Waverly	Sussex	Central	Art	Folk art carvings, includes Peanut Museum about the area peanut industry
Military Aviation Museum	Virginia Beach	Virginia Beach	Tidewater/Hampton Roads	Aviation	Features restored warbirds from around the world
Mill House Museum	Occoquan	Prince William	Northern	Mill	website, operated by the Occoquan Historical Society
Miller-Kite House	Elkton	Rockingham	Shenandoah Valley	Civil War	19th-century house used by Stonewall Jackson as headquarters in 1862, operated by the Elkton Historical Society
Monacan Ancestral Museum	Amherst	Amherst	Central	Native American	website, history and culture of the Monacan people
Monroe Park Gold Mining Camp Museum	Goldvein	Fauquier	Northern	Industry - gold mining	website
Montgomery Museum	Christiansburg	Montgomery	Blue Ridge Highlands	Multiple	website, full name Montgomery Museum and Lewis Miller Regional Art Center, local history and regional art exhibitions
Monticello	Charlottesville	Albemarle	Central	Presidential home	Estate of Thomas Jefferson
Montpelier	Orange	Orange	Central	Presidential home	Estate of James Madison
Morattico Waterfront Museum	Morattico	Lancaster	Chesapeake Bay	Local history	website, fishing, crabbing, farming, a general store display, Native Americans
Morefield Mine	Amelia	Amelia	Central	Industry - mining	website, active tourist mine known for mica, tantalite, amazonite, and massive topaz
Morven Park	Leesburg	Loudoun	Northern	Historic house	Includes the early 20th-century period Westmoreland Davis Mansion
Moses Myers House	Norfolk	Norfolk	Tidewater/Hampton Roads	Historic house	Early 19th-century period home of a prosperous Jewish merchant and his family, owned by the Chrysler Museum of Art
Mount Jackson Museum	Mount Jackson	Shenandoah	Shenandoah Valley	Local history	Located in the Town Center
Mount Vernon	Mount Vernon	Fairfax	Northern	Presidential home	Estate of George Washington
Muscarelle Museum of Art	Williamsburg	Williamsburg	Tidewater/Hampton Roads	Art	Part of The College of William & Mary
Museum at Colonial Beach	Colonial Beach	Westmoreland	Chesapeake Bay	Local history	Operated by the Colonial Beach Historical Society
Museum of Bank History at Suntrust Bank	Staunton	Staunton	Shenandoah Valley	Industry - Banking	
Museum of Charlotte County	Charlotte Court House	Charlotte	Southern	Local history	website, located in the former county jail
Museum of Chincoteague Island	Chincoteague	Accomack	Eastern Shore	Local history	
Museum of Culpeper History	Culpeper	Culpeper	Northern	Local history	website
Museum of Geosciences	Blacksburg	Montgomery	Blue Ridge Highlands	Natural history	website, part of Virginia Tech, gems, minerals, rocks, fossils
Museum of Hounds & Hunting North America	Leesburg	Loudoun	Northern	Sports	Located at Morven Park, art and artifacts about foxhunting
Museum of Military History	Portsmouth	Portsmouth	Tidewater/Hampton Roads	Military	Private museum of military artifacts, pictures, weapons and other memorabilia
Museum of the Confederacy-Appomattox	Appomattox	Appomattox	Central	Civil War	Operated by the American Civil War Museum, stories of the closing days of the Civil War and the beginnings of our country's journey toward reuniting as Americans
Museum of the Middle Appalachians	Saltville	Smyth	Blue Ridge Highlands	Local history	website, history, natural history, Native Americans, Civil War exhibits
Museum of the Shenandoah Valley	Winchester	Winchester	Shenandoah Valley	Multiple	Historic Glen Burnie house, art collection, decorative arts, gardens
NASA Visitor Center	Wallops Island	Accomack	Tidewater/Hampton Roads	Aerospace	Adjacent to Wallops Flight Facility
National Capitol Squadron	Brandy Station	Culpeper	Northern	Transportation - Aviation	website, Commemorative Air Force display of a fleet of aircraft known as the Ghost Squadron, located at Culpeper Regional Airport
National Civil War Chaplains Museum	Lynchburg	Lynchburg	Central	Civil War	website; on the campus of Liberty University, role of chaplains, priests, rabbis and religious organizations in the Civil War
National Firearms Museum	Fairfax	Fairfax	Northern	Weaponry	Located at the headquarters of the National Rifle Association
National Inventors Hall of Fame	Alexandria	Alexandria	Northern	Technology	American inventions, inventors, patent and trademark systems, located in the U.S. Patent and Trademark Office
National Museum of the Civil War Soldier	Petersburg	Petersburg	Central	Civil War	Part of Pamplin Historical Park, history of the 3 million soldiers who served during the American Civil War
National Museum of the Marine Corps	Triangle	Prince William	Northern	Military	
National Museum of the United States Army	Fort Belvoir	Fairfax	Northern	Military	
National Sporting Library & Museum	Middleburg	Loudoun	Northern	Art	Hosts art exhibitions related to horses and field sports
Nauticus	Norfolk	Norfolk	Tidewater/Hampton Roads	Science	Also the home of the USS Wisconsin
Newsome House Museum and Cultural Center	Newport News	Newport News	Tidewater/Hampton Roads	African American	
Newtown History Center	Stephens City	Frederick	Shenandoah Valley	Local history	website
Norfolk History Museum at the Willoughby-Baylor House	Norfolk	Norfolk	Tidewater/Hampton Roads	Local history	Owned by Chrysler Museum of Art, city history, decorative arts, maritime and military heritage
Norfolk Southern Museum	Norfolk	Norfolk	Tidewater/Hampton Roads	Railway	History and artifacts of Norfolk Southern Railway, includes sections of Civil War-era track, vintage hand tools, and diagrams to teach hand signals to railroad trainees, located in the Norfolk Southern Tower
North Bend Plantation	Charles City	Charles City	Tidewater/Hampton Roads	Historic house	
Northampton County Court Green	Eastville	Northampton	Eastern Shore	Open-air	Open seasonally, operated by the Northampton Historic Preservation Society, restored 1731 courthouse, clerk's office and 1814 debtors' prison
Northern Neck Farm Museum	Heathsville	Northumberland	Chesapeake Bay	Agriculture	website
Nyumba Ya Tausi-Peacock Museum	Bristol	Bristol	Blue Ridge Highlands	African American	African American artifacts, local black memorabilia, slavery, and family heirlooms, housed in a building that once served as the home of an ex-slave
Oakland: Nelson County's Museum of History	Lovingston	Nelson	Central	Local history	Cornerstone of museum is Oakland House, once Mitchell's Brick House Tavern, operated by the Nelson County Historical Society
Oatlands Plantation	Leesburg	Loudoun	Northern	Historic house	19th-century mansion
Occoneechee State Park	Clarksville	Mecklenburg	Southern	Native American	Visitor center features Native American history, a living hut and artifacts
Old City Cemetery Museums	Lynchburg	Lynchburg	Central	History	Five museums: Hearse House and Caretakers' Museum about the cemetery and funerals, Pest House Medical Museum about its use as a hospital in the Civil War, Station House Museum with railroad artifacts, Mourning Museum about mourning artifacts and customs, Chapel and Columbarium about the religious leaders buried in the cemetery
Virginia Beach Surf & Rescue Museum	Virginia Beach	Virginia Beach	Tidewater/Hampton Roads	Military	Depicts this Coast Guard Station's life-saving activities & history as well as the many ship-wrecks off the Virginia coast.
Old Court House Civil War Museum	Winchester	Winchester	Shenandoah Valley	Civil War	
Old Cranks Motorcar Museum	Galax	Galax	Blue Ridge Highlands	Transportation - Automotive	website
Old Jail Museum	Louisa	Louisa	Central	Jail	website, operated by the Louisa County Historical Society, 19th-century jail adjacent to the Louisa County Courthouse
Old Stone Jail Museum	Palmyra	Fluvanna	Central	Jail	website, operated by the Fluvanna County Historical Society
Olde Dominion Agricultural Complex	Chatham	Pittsylvania	Southern	Agriculture	website, includes exhibits from the National Tobacco-Textile Museum
O. Winston Link Museum	Roanoke	Roanoke	Shenandoah Valley	Photography	Railroad photographs
Page County Heritage Association Museums	Luray	Page	Shenandoah Valley	History	website, open the 1st Saturday of the month from May through September, includes the Calendine Museum, Hamburg Country Store, Mauck's Meetinghouse, Massanutten School
Pamplin Historical Park	Petersburg	Petersburg	Central	Living	Includes National Museum of the Civil War Soldier, three other museums, four historic buildings, civilian and military living history programs, and guided tours of the Breakthrough Battlefield and Tudor Hall Plantation
Pamunkey Indian Museum	King William	King William	Tidewater/Hampton Roads	Native American	Information on the Pamunkey people, their history and way of life
Patrick County Historical Society Museum	Stuart	Patrick	Blue Ridge Highlands	Local history	website
Pear Valley	Eastville	Northampton	Eastern Shore	Historic house	18th-century one room yeoman's cottage, open by appointment
Peninsula Fine Arts Center	Newport News	Newport News	Tidewater/Hampton Roads	Art	
Petersburg National Battlefield	Petersburg	Petersburg	Central	Civil War	Visitor centers in Petersburg, Hopewell and Dinwiddie
Philpott Lake Visitor Center	Bassett	Henry	Southern	Natural history	
Piedmont Arts	Martinsville	Henry	Southern	Art	Visual and performing arts center, features museum with exhibitions by international, national and regional artists in its seven galleries
Piney Grove at Southall's Plantation	Charles City	Charles City	Tidewater/Hampton Roads	Historic house	
Plains District Memorial Museum	Timberville	Rockingham	Shenandoah Valley	Local history	website
Pleasant Grove (Palmyra, Virginia)	Palmyra	Fluvanna	Central	Historic house	19th-century home with displays of local history, agriculture
Plumb House Museum	Waynesboro	Waynesboro	Shenandoah Valley	Historic house	
Pocahontas Exhibition Coal Mine and Museum	Pocahontas	Tazewell	Heart of Appalachia	Industry - Mining	Historic coal mine and equipment
Pocahontas State Park	Chesterfield	Chesterfield	Central	History	Includes Civilian Conservation Corps Museum, dedicated to the Depression-era workers who helped build the state park system
Poe Museum	Richmond	Richmond	Central	Biographical	Life and career of author Edgar Allan Poe, and focusing on his many years in Richmond
Point of Honor	Lynchburg	Lynchburg	Central	Historic house	Early 19th-century period house, exhibits about Lynchburg's history
Pope-Leighey House	Alexandria	Alexandria	Northern	Historic house	Designed by Frank Lloyd Wright, now on the site of the Woodlawn Plantation
Poplar Forest	Forest	Bedford	Central	Presidential home	Early 19th-century plantation and plantation retreat house of Thomas Jefferson
Poquoson Museum	Poquoson	York	Tidewater/Hampton Roads	Local history	website
Port Republic Museum	Port Republic	Rockingham	Shenandoah Valley	Local history	website, operated by the Society of Port Republic Preservationists
Port Royal Museum of History	Port Royal	Caroline	Northern	Local history	website
Portsmouth Art & Cultural Center	Portsmouth	Portsmouth	Tidewater/Hampton Roads	Art	website, located in the Portsmouth Courthouse
Portsmouth Community Colored Library	Portsmouth	Portsmouth	Tidewater/Hampton Roads	African-American	Area African-American history
Portsmouth Naval Shipyard Museum	Portsmouth	Portsmouth	Tidewater/Hampton Roads	Maritime	Includes the Lightship Portsmouth
Prestwould	Clarksville	Mecklenburg	Southern	Historic house	
Prince George County Regional Heritage Center	Prince George	Prince George	Central	Local history	website, operated by the Prince George County Historical Society
Princess Anne County Training School/Union Kempsville High School Museum	Virginia Beach	Virginia Beach	Tidewater/Hampton Roads	African-American	website, history of the first high school for African Americans in Princess Anne County; open by appointment
Radford University Art Museum	Radford	Radford	Blue Ridge Highlands	Art	website, comprises five gallery spaces: The Art Museum at the Covington Center, Gallery 205 in Porterfield Hall, the Art Museum Downtown, and two satellite galleries located in Muse Hall and Tyler Hall
Radford University Museum of the Earth Sciences	Radford	Radford	Blue Ridge Highlands	Natural history	website, fossils, gems, minerals
Ralph Stanley Museum	Clintwood	Dickenson	Heart of Appalachia	Music	Combines the career of Dr. Ralph Edmond Stanley with the history of traditional mountain music
Rapidan Camp		Madison	Central	Presidential home	Restored 1929-period summer retreat established by President and Mrs. Herbert Hoover, located within the boundaries of Shenandoah National Park
Ratcliffe-Allison House	Fairfax	Fairfax	Northern	Historic house	19th-century house
Raymond F. Ratcliffe Memorial Museum	Pulaski	Pulaski	Blue Ridge Highlands	Local history	Located in a historic depot
Red Hill Patrick Henry National Memorial	Brookneal	Charlotte	Central	Open-air	Reconstructed home, law office and museum about Patrick Henry
Reedville Fisherman's Museum	Reedville	Northumberland	Chesapeake Bay	Maritime	Open-air museum of local maritime industry
Reston Museum	Reston	Fairfax	Northern	Local history	website
Reuel B. Pritchett Museum	Bridgewater	Rockingham	Shenandoah Valley	History	Part of the Alexander Mack Library at Bridgewater College, artifacts from the American Civil War, Native-Americans, pioneer life, coins, weapons, bibles, bottles & glassware and more
Reeves Center and Watson Pavilion	Lexington	Lexington	Shenandoah Valley	Art	website, part of Washington and Lee University, Asian art and ceramics, also includes Japanese Tea Room
Reynolds Homestead	Critz	Patrick	Blue Ridge Highlands	Historic house	19th-century period boyhood home of R.J. Reynolds, operated by Virginia Tech
Richmond County Museum	Warsaw	Richmond	Chesapeake Bay	Local history	website
Richmond National Battlefield Park	Richmond	Richmond	Central	Civil War	Commemorates over 30 American Civil War sites around Richmond
Richmond Railroad Museum	Richmond	Richmond	Central	Railroad	Includes a station master's office, freight room with railroad artifacts and exhibits, an HO scale model railroad, a steam saddle locomotive, baggage car and caboose, along with track cars, signals and other railroad artifacts
Riddick's Folly	Suffolk	Suffolk	Tidewater/Hampton Roads	Historic house	1837 Greek Revival mansion
Ripley's Believe It or Not!	Williamsburg	Williamsburg	Tidewater/Hampton Roads	Media	
Rippon Lodge	Woodbridge	Prince William	Northern	Historic house	
Rising Sun Tavern	Fredericksburg	Fredericksburg	Northern	Historic house	Late 18th-century period tavern
Roaring Twenties Antique Car Museum	Hood	Madison	Central	Transportation - Automotive	Automobiles from 1904 to 1948, including a Hupmobile, Nash, Packard and a Carter Electric Motorette
Robert Russa Moton Museum	Farmville	Prince Edward	Central	History	Civil rights and segregation
Robert Thomas Carriage Museum	Blackstone	Nottoway	Northern	Transportation	website, restored horse-drawn vehicles including pleasure vehicles, a hearse, sleigh, surreys, wagons and buggies
Rochelle-Prince House	Courtland	Southampton	Tidewater/Hampton Roads	Historic house	Operated by the Southampton County Historical Society
Rosewell Plantation	Gloucester	Gloucester	Chesapeake Bay	Historic site	Ruins of plantation house with archaeological artifacts on exhibit
R.R. Smith Center for History and Art	Staunton	Staunton	Shenandoah Valley	Multiple	website, home of the Augusta County Historical Society, Historic Staunton Foundation, Staunton Augusta Art Center, exhibition galleries of history and art
Rucker's Communication Museum	Martinsville	Henry	Southern	Technology	Telephones and the history of telecommunications, located inside Rucker's Antique Emporium and Auction House
Sailor's Creek Battlefield Historical State Park	Rice	Amelia	Central	Civil War	Includes visitor center about the Civil War battle
Salem Museum	Salem	Salem	Shenandoah Valley	Local history	Located in the Williams-Brown House and Store
Sanders House	Bluefield	Tazewell	Heart of Appalachia	Historic house	Late 19th-century house, operated by the Graham Historical Society
Sargeant Museum	Louisa	Louisa	Central	Local history	website, operated by the Louisa County Historical Society
Schoolhouse Museum	Smithfield	Isle of Wight	Tidewater/Hampton Roads	Schoolhouse	website, one room schoolhouse for African-American children
Schwartz Tavern	Blackstone	Nottoway	Northern	History	Restored tavern dating to 1798
Science Museum of Virginia	Richmond	Richmond	Central	Science	
Science Museum of Western Virginia	Roanoke	Roanoke	Shenandoah Valley	Science	Website
Scotchtown (plantation)	Ashland	Hanover	Central	Historic house	Owned and managed by Preservation Virginia
Scottsville Museum	Scottsville	Albemarle	Central	Local history	website
Second Street Gallery	Charlottesville	Albemarle	Central	Art	website, nonprofit contemporary artspace
Settlers Museum of Southwest Virginia	Atkins	Smyth	Blue Ridge Highlands	Living	website
Shenandoah Courthouse Museum	Woodstock	Shenandoah	Shenandoah Valley	Local history	Operated by the Shenandoah County Historical Society
Shenandoah Germanic Heritage Museum	Mount Olive	Shenandoah	Shenandoah Valley	Historic house	website, operated by Hottel-Keller Memorial Association, 18th-century Keller Homestead
Shenandoah Valley Cultural Heritage Museum at The Edinburg Mill	Edinburg	Shenandoah	Shenandoah Valley	Mill	Located in a restored 19th-century grist mill
Shenandoah Valley Discovery Museum	Winchester	Winchester	Shenandoah Valley	Children's	website
Sherwood Forest Plantation	Charles City	Charles City	Tidewater/Hampton Roads	Presidential home	Home of President John Tyler
Shirley Plantation	Charles City	Charles City	Tidewater/Hampton Roads	Historic house	
Sidney E. King Arts Center	Bowling Green	Caroline	Northern	Multiple	website, operated by the Bowling Green Arts Commission, community art center, includes local history displays by the Caroline Historical Society
Siege Museum	Petersburg	Petersburg	Central	Civil War	City history and history of the Siege of Petersburg
Simpson Funeral Museum	Chatham	Pittsylvania	Southern	History	website, history of burials and burying practices, includes hearses, coffins, presidential caskets, vaults, antique embalming room and regalia
Smithfield Plantation	Blacksburg	Montgomery	Blue Ridge Highlands	Living	Late 18th-century plantation furnished with eighteenth and nineteenth century Decorative arts furniture, portraits, museum of archaeological finds on site
Smith's Fort Plantation	Surry	Surry	Tidewater/Hampton Roads	Historic house	Owned and managed by Preservation Virginia
Smyth County Historical and Museum Society	Marion	Smyth	Blue Ridge Highlands	Local history	
Southampton Agriculture and Forestry Museum	Courtland	Southampton	Tidewater/Hampton Roads	Industry	website, operated by the Southampton County Historical Society, farm life and area lumber industry
South Boston - Halifax County Museum of Fine Arts & History	South Boston	Halifax	Southern	Multiple	website, local history, Native Americans, art
South Hill Model Railroad Museum	South Hill	Mecklenburg	Southern	Toy	Located in restored South Hill Depot, HO model trains and local train information; location also houses the Virginia S. Evans Doll Museum
Southwest Virginia Museum	Big Stone Gap	Wise	Heart of Appalachia	Local history	History, culture and industry of Southwest Virginia
Spotsylvania County Museum	Spotsylvania	Spotsylvania	Northern	Local history	website
Springfield Rosseechee Museum	Clarksville	Mecklenburg	Southern	Native American	
Stabler-Leadbeater Apothecary Museum	Alexandria	Alexandria	Northern	Medical	Apothecary and store dating back to 1805
Stage Door Gallery	Cape Charles	Northampton	Eastern Shore	Art	
Star Museum	Abingdon	Washington	Blue Ridge Highlands	Media	Movie star memorabilia
Staunton River Battlefield State Park	Clover	Halifax	Southern	History	Two visitor centers, exhibits on the American Civil War, Native Americans, railroads, production of electric energy
Steamboat Era Museum	Irvington	Lancaster	Chesapeake Bay	Maritime	website, history of the steamboat era on the Chesapeake Bay from 1813 until 1937
Steven F. Udvar-Hazy Center	Chantilly	Fairfax	Northern	Aerospace	Part of the Smithsonian National Air and Space Museum - located at Washington Dulles International Airport
St. James' House	Fredericksburg	Fredericksburg	Northern	Historic house	website, 18th-century house, headquarters for Washington Heritage Museums, open Garden Week in April, the first full week in October and by appointment for group tours
Stonewall Jackson's Headquarters Museum	Winchester	Winchester	Shenandoah Valley	Civil War	
Stonewall Jackson House	Lexington	Lexington	Shenandoah Valley	Civil War	
Strasburg Museum	Strasburg	Shenandoah	Shenandoah Valley	Local history	Local railroad and pottery industry exhibits
Stratford Hall Plantation	Stratford	Westmoreland	Chesapeake Bay	Historic house	Home of four generations of the Lee family of Virginia and birthplace of Robert E. Lee
Suffolk Art Gallery	Suffolk	Suffolk	Tidewater/Hampton Roads	Art	website, community art gallery, operated by the Suffolk Art League
Suffolk Seaboard Station Railroad Museum	Suffolk	Suffolk	Tidewater/Hampton Roads	Railway	website, owned and operated by the Suffolk-Nansemond Historical Society
Sully Historic Site	Chantilly	Fairfax	Northern	Historic house	Early 19th-century Lee family house, includes original outbuildings, representative slave quarter and gardens
Surry County VA Historical Society & Museums	Surry	Surry	Tidewater/Hampton Roads	Local history	
Sweet Briar College Art Galleries	Sweet Briar	Amherst	Central	Art	website, includes the Pannell Gallery and two satellite galleries
Tangier History Museum & Interpretive Cultural Center	Tangier Island	Accomack	Eastern Shore	Local history	website
Taubman Museum of Art	Roanoke	Roanoke	Shenandoah Valley	Art	Formerly the Art Museum of Western Virginia, focus is American art, particularly Western Virginia and the Appalachian region
This Century Art Gallery	Williamsburg	Williamsburg	Tidewater/Hampton Roads	Art	website, contemporary paintings, sculpture and crafts by regional and national artists
Thomas J. Boyd Museum	Wytheville	Wythe	Blue Ridge Highlands	Local history	website
Thomas James Store	Mathews Court House	Mathews	Chesapeake Bay	History	Preserved mercantile store, operated by the Mathews County Historical Society
Tobacco Farm Life Museum of Virginia	South Hill	Mecklenburg	Southern	Industry - Tobacco	Area tobacco farming
Tompkins Cottage	Mathews	Mathews	Chesapeake Bay	Historic house	website, operated by the Matthews County Historical Society
Torpedo Factory Art Center	Alexandria	Alexandria	Northern	Art	A member-artist run co-op space with three floors of open studios and galleries
Tredegar Iron Works	Richmond	Richmond	Central	Civil War	Visitor's center has exhibits about the Civil War, the foundry and rolling mill, and local history
Tuckahoe Plantation	Manakin	Goochland	Central	Presidential home	Boyhood home of Thomas Jefferson
United States Army Women's Museum	Fort Gregg-Adams	Prince George	Northern	Military	
University of Richmond Museums	Richmond	Richmond	Central	Multiple	website, includes the Joel and Lila Harnett Museum of Art, Lora Robins Gallery of Design from Nature, Joel and Lila Harnett Print Study Center
University of Virginia Galleries	Charlottesville	Albemarle	Central	Art	website, includes the Ruffin Gallery for contemporary art, history exhibits at the Harrison Institute, The Niche moving image exhibition project in the Fine Arts Library, John P. and Stephanie F. Connaughton Gallery for student work in the McIntire School of Commerce
Upper Wolfsnare	Virginia Beach	Virginia Beach	Tidewater/Hampton Roads	Historic house	Mid-18th-century brick home, open for tours on a limited basis by the Princess Anne County/Virginia Beach Historical Society
U.S. Army Quartermaster Museum	Fort Gregg-Adams	Prince George	Central	Military	
U.S. Army Transportation Museum	Newport News	Newport News	Tidewater/Hampton Roads	Transportation	Located at Fort Eustis
UVa Computer Museum	Charlottesville	Albemarle	Central	Technology	website, part of University of Virginia, located in the 5th floor atrium of Rice Hall
The Valentine	Richmond	Richmond	Central	Local history	Richmond's history, culture and government, sculptures from Edward V. Valentine and the 1812 John Wickham House
Valley Brethren-Mennonite Heritage Center	Harrisonburg	Rockingham	Shenandoah Valley	Religious	website, life and faith practices of Mennonites and Brethren through tours of an early 1800s log house, a Civil War era Burkholder-Myers House, wash house, blacksmith shop, and one room school and meetinghouse
Valley Turnpike Museum	Harrisonburg	Rockingham	Shenandoah Valley	Local history	website, history and heritage of US Route 11, aka The Valley Turnpike, located in the Hardesty-Higgins House with the city's visitor center
Vietnam War Foundation Museum	Ruckersville	Greene	Central	Military	website, open by appointment, includes Vietnam War-era trucks, aircraft, jeeps, APCs, memorabilia, Viet Cong artifacts, weapons, and civilian and "peace" symbols
Violet Bank Museum	Colonial Heights	Colonial Heights	Central	Civil War	1815 to 1873 period estate house, features Civil War artifacts, General Lee's headquarters during the Siege of Petersburg
Vinton Historical Society and Museum	Vinton	Roanoke	Shenandoah Valley	Local history	
Virginia Air and Space Center	Hampton	Hampton	Tidewater/Hampton Roads	Aerospace	Space explorations, NASA and Air Force aircraft and technology
Virginia Aquarium & Marine Science Center	Virginia Beach	Virginia Beach	Tidewater/Hampton Roads	Natural history	Formerly known as the Virginia Marine Science Museum, aquarium and marine science exhibits
Virginia Aviation Museum	Richmond	Richmond	Central	Aviation	
Virginia Discovery Museum	Charlottesville	Albemarle	Central	Children's	Exhibits on the arts, sciences, humanities, history and nature
Virginia's Executive Mansion	Richmond	Richmond	Central	Historic house	Has served as the home of Virginia governors and their families since 1813, tours at specific times and days of the week
Virginia Historical Society	Richmond	Richmond	Central	History	
Virginia Holocaust Museum	Richmond	Richmond	Central	Holocaust	
Virginia House	Richmond	Richmond	Central	Historic house	Operated by the Virginia Historical Society, 1920s English Tudor house
Virginia Institute of Marine Science Visitor Center and Aquarium	Gloucester Point	Gloucester	Chesapeake Bay	Natural history	Marine life and oceanography
Virginia Living Museum	Newport News	Newport News	Tidewater/Hampton Roads	Natural history	Virginia's natural history and ecosystems, live mammals, fish, reptiles and birds
Virginia Museum of Contemporary Art	Virginia Beach	Virginia Beach	Tidewater/Hampton Roads	Art	Focuses on 20th-century art with changing exhibitions of American & international artists.
Virginia Museum of Fine Arts	Richmond	Richmond	Central	Art	Encyclopedic collection of 33,000 works of art from almost every major world culture
Virginia Museum of Natural History	Martinsville	Henry	Southern	Natural history	Virginia's natural heritage
Virginia Museum of the Civil War	New Market	Shenandoah	Shenandoah Valley	Civil War	Located in New Market Battlefield State Historical Park, history of Virginia in the Civil War, includes Bushong Farm
Virginia Museum of Transportation	Roanoke	Roanoke	Shenandoah Valley	Transportation	Trains, planes, automobiles
Virginia Musical Museum	Williamsburg	Williamsburg	Tidewater/Hampton Roads	Music	Includes rare, antique musical instruments, phonographs and personal items from Virginia musicians
Virginia Quilt Museum	Harrisonburg	Rockingham	Shenandoah Valley	Textile	website, exhibitions of both traditional and contemporary quilts are changed quarterly, located in the historic Warren-Sipe House
Virginia Randolph Cottage	Glen Allen	Henrico	Central	Biographical	Legacy of African-American education Virginia Randolph
Virginia S. Evans Doll Museum	South Hill	Mecklenburg	Southern	Toy	Located in restored South Hill Depot, which also houses the South Hill Model Railroad Museum
Virginia Sports Hall of Fame and Museum	Portsmouth	Portsmouth	Tidewater/Hampton Roads	Hall of Fame - Sports	
Virginia State Capitol	Richmond	Richmond	Central	State capitol	
Virginia Tech Galleries	Blacksburg	Montgomery	Blue Ridge Highlands	Art	website, includes the Armory Gallery, gallery in the Holtzman Alumni Center, Norris Hall Art Gallery, Perspective Gallery in the Squires Student Center, Moss Arts Center with three visual arts galleries
Virginia War Museum	Newport News	Newport News	Tidewater/Hampton Roads	Military	Documents American military history from 1775 to the present
Visual Arts Center of Richmond	Richmond	Richmond	Central	Art	Visual art gallery and performing arts center
VMI Museum	Lexington	Lexington	Shenandoah Valley	Military	website, history of Virginia Military Institute
Walter Reed Birthplace	Gloucester	Gloucester	Chesapeake Bay	Historic house	Operated by appointment with the Gloucester Preservation Foundation
Walton's Mountain Museum	Schuyler	Nelson	Central	Media	website, replicas of house and settings from The Waltons television show
Warren Rifles Confederate Museum	Front Royal	Warren	Shenandoah Valley	Civil War	website, operated by the Warren Rifles Chapter United Daughters of the Confederacy
Watermen's Museum	Yorktown	York	Tidewater/Hampton Roads	Maritime	Fishing and boating history of Yorktown
Waynesboro African-American Museum	Waynesboro	Waynesboro	Shenandoah Valley	African American	Open by appointment
Waynesboro Heritage Museum	Waynesboro	Waynesboro	Shenandoah Valley	Local history	website, operated by the Waynesboro Heritage Foundation
Weems–Botts Museum	Dumfries	Prince William	Northern	Local history	website
Westmoreland County Museum	Montross	Westmoreland	Tidewater/Hampton Roads	Local history	website
Weston Manor	Hopewell	Hopewell	Central	Historic house	18th-century plantation house
Weston Farmstead	Casanova	Fauquier	Northern	Historic house	19th-century farmstead
White House and Museum of the Confederacy	Richmond	Richmond	Central	Civil War	
White Oak Civil War Museum	Falmouth	Stafford	Northern	Civil War	
White's Mill	Abingdon	Washington	Blue Ridge Highlands	Mill	Late 18-century grist mill
Wickham House	Richmond	Richmond	Central	Historic house	Operated by The Valentine, early 19th-century house
Wilderness Road Regional Museum	Newbern	Pulaski	Blue Ridge Highlands	Open-air	website, owned and operated by the New River Historical Society
William King Museum of Art	Abingdon	Washington	Blue Ridge Highlands	Art	Exhibits of fine world art, contemporary regional art and cultural heritage
Wilton House Museum	Richmond	Richmond	Central	Historic house	18th-century house with rotating exhibitions, 18th and 19th-century period rooms, regular programs and events
Winmill Carriage Museum	Leesburg	Loudoun	Northern	Transportation	Located at Morven Park, horse-drawn vehicles including antique coaches, carriages, sleds and carts
Wolf Creek Cherokee Museum	Stuart	Patrick	Blue Ridge Highlands	Native American	
Wolf Creek Indian Village and Museum	Bastian	Bland	Blue Ridge Highlands	Native American	Reconstruction of a Native American village, approximately dating from 1480-1520
Women in Military Service for America Memorial	Arlington	Arlington	Northern	Military	Includes museum with exhibits on women in the military and military history
Wood Brothers Racing Museum	Stuart	Patrick	Blue Ridge Highlands	Sports	website
Woodlawn Plantation	Alexandria	Alexandria	Northern	Historic house	
Woodrow Wilson Presidential Library and Museum	Staunton	Staunton	Shenandoah Valley	Presidential home	Birthplace of President Woodrow Wilson
Woodstock Museum of Shenandoah County Virginia	Woodstock	Shenandoah	Shenandoah Valley	Local history	County history, domestic artifacts, decorative arts, 18th-century log Wickham House
Workhouse Arts Center	Lorton	Fairfax	Northern	Art	Visual and performing arts studio and exhibition space as well as arts education programs
Wythe County African-American Heritage Museum	Wytheville	Wythe	Blue Ridge Highlands	African-American	website
Yorktown Battlefield	Yorktown	York	Tidewater/Hampton Roads	Military	Part of Colonial National Historical Park, includes the Yorktown Visitor Center with exhibits about the Battle of Yorktown (1781), the early 18th-century Nelson House and the Moore House where surrender negotiations occurred
York County Historical Museum	Yorktown	York	Tidewater/Hampton Roads	Local history	website

== Defunct museums ==
- Anderson Gallery, Richmond, part of VCU School of the Arts, closed in 2015, collection moved to VCU Libraries
- Artisans Center of Virginia Galleries, Waynesboro, closed the galleries in 2009
- Beebe Ranch, Chincoteaque, closed in 2010
- Claude Moore Colonial Farm
- Civil War Life Museum, Massaponax
- Collingwood Library and Museum, Alexandria
- Dennis Reedy Railroad & Coalmining Museum, Clinchco
- Freedom Park, Arlington, former sculpture park
- Frontier City, Virginia Beach
- Jeane Dixon Museum and Library, Strasburg
- Marine Corps Air-Ground Museum - Marine Corps Base Quantico
- George C. Marshall Museum; closed in January 2021
- Morgan-McClure Motorsports Museum, Abingdon
- Museum of American Presidents, Strasburg
- Natural Bridge Toy Museum, Natural Bridge; closed in November 2012
- Natural Bridge Wax Museum, Natural Bridge, closed in 2014
- P. Buckley Moss Museum, Waynesboro, closed in 2014
- Presidents Park (Virginia), Williamsburg, closed as of 9/30/10
- Professor Cline's Haunted Monster Museum and Dark Maze, Natural Bridge; destroyed in a fire April 16, 2012.
- Refuge Waterfowl Museum, Chincoteague, closed in 2013 and contents auctioned
- Smithsonian Institution Naturalist Center, Leesburg, closed in 2011
- Statlers Museum, Staunton, museum of the Statler Brothers, closed in 2002
- United States Geological Survey Visitors Center, Reston
- United States National Slavery Museum
- Virginia's Explore Park

== Regions of Virginia ==
As defined by Virginia Tourism site

- Central: Altavista, Amelia, Amherst, Appomattox, Bedford, Blackstone, Charlottesville, Chester, Chesterfield, Colonial Heights, Farmville, Fort Gregg-Adams, Glen Allen, Goochland, Gordonsville, Hampden-Sydney, Hood, Hopewell, Louisa, Lynchburg, Mineral, Orange, Palmyra, Pamplin, Petersburg, Piney River, Powhatan, Richmond, Schuyler, Scottsville.
- Chesapeake Bay region: Essex, Gloucester, King & Queen, King George, King William, Lancaster, Mathews, Middlesex, Northumberland, Richmond, Westmoreland
- Northern: Alexandria, Arlington, Brandy Station, Chantilly, Crewe, Culpeper, Dumfries, Fairfax, Fairfax Station, Falmouth, Fredericksburg, Goldvein, Gum Springs, Haymarket, Herndon, Leesburg, Lovettsville, Manassas, McLean, Middleburg, Mount Vernon, Occoquan, Potomac Mills, Reston, Spotsylvania, Sterling, Vienna, Warrenton, Woodford, White Post.
- Tidewater/Hampton Roads: Chesapeake, Courtland, Fort Monroe, Hampton, Jamestown, King William, Montross, Newport News, Norfolk, Portsmouth, Smithfield, Suffolk, Surry, Virginia Beach, Williamsburg, Yorktown and Chincoteague/Assateague on the Eastern Shore.
- Shenandoah Valley: Boyce, Bridgewater, Clifton Forge, Dayton, Edinburg, Elkton, Fincastle, Front Royal, Harrisonburg, Lexington, Luray, McDowell, Middletown, Millwood, Monterey, Mount Jackson, Natural Bridge, New Castle, Port Republic, Roanoke, Salem, Staunton, Steeles Tavern, Stephens City, Strasburg, Timberville, Waynesboro, Winchester, Woodstock.
- Southern: Clarksville, Danville, Gretna, Halifax, Martinsville, South Boston, South Hill.
- Blue Ridge Highlands: Abingdon, Ararat, Atkins, Bastian, Blacksburg, Bland, Bristol, Cana, Christianburg, Ferrum, Galax, Hillsville, Marion, Newbern, Pearlsburg, Pulaski, Saltville, Stuart, Radford, Woodlawn, Wytheville.

== See also ==
- Aquaria in Virginia
- List of historical societies in Virginia
- Nature Centers in Virginia
