= List of nature centers in Virginia =

Virginia Nature Centers (Hover mouse over pog to popup clickable link)

This is a list of nature centers and environmental education centers in the state of Virginia.

To use the sortable tables: click on the icons at the top of each column to sort that column in alphabetical order; click again for reverse alphabetical order.

Name	Location	County/City	Region	Summary
Banshee Reeks Nature Preserve	Leesburg	Loudoun	Northern	website, 725 acres of successional fields, hardwood forests, wetlands, and riverine habitat; nature center; and over 20 miles of trails; operated by the county, with support from Friends of Banshee Reeks and from Banshee Reeks Chapter of Virginia Master Naturalists
Blacksburg Price House Nature Center	Blacksburg	Montgomery		website
Blue Ridge Center	Purcellville	Loudoun	Northern	website, 900 acres, trails, education center
Boxerwood Gardens	Lexington	Lexington	Southwest Virginia	15-acre arboretum, nature center and woodland garden
Broadlands Nature Center	Broadlands	Loudoun	Northern	website, information, operated by the Audubon Naturalist Society and the Broadlands Homeowners Association, local animals, nature programs and events
Claytor Nature Study Center of the University of Lynchburg	Bedford	Bedford	Central Virginia	website, 470 acre nature center owned and operated by the University of Lynchburg, includes education and research facility, Cloverlea Farm and Memorial Gardens, environmental programs, nature trails, campground, Belk Astronomical Observatory, and horticultural research area
Claytor Lake State Park Discovery Center	Dublin	Pulaski	Southwest Virginia	472 acres, visitor center exhibits about lake ecology, fish life
Ellanor C. Lawrence Park	Chantilly	Fairfax	Northern	650 acres, operated by the county, Walney Visitors Center features educational exhibits, programs and information, live animals
False Cape State Park	Virginia Beach	Virginia Beach	Hampton Roads	4,321 acres, Wash Woods Environmental Center for ecological studies, park also offers nature programs
First Landing State Park	Virginia Beach	Virginia Beach	Hampton Roads	2,888 acres, Chesapeake Bay Center, environmental programs
Frogshackle Nature Center	Sterling	Loudoun	Northern	website, operated by the County at Claude Moore Park for special events
Gulf Branch Nature Center	Arlington	Arlington	Northern	website, 37 acres, operated by the City in Gulf Branch Park and Natural Area
Hidden Oaks Nature Center	Annandale	Fairfax	Northern	website, operated by the County in the 52-acre Annandale District Park
Hidden Pond Nature Center	Springfield	Fairfax	Northern	website, 25 acres, operated by the county, adjacent to 700-acre Pohick Stream Valley Park
Norma Hoffman Visitors Center at Huntley Meadows	Hybla Valley	Fairfax	Northern	Over 1,500 acres, operated by the county, visitor center includes an auditorium and museum space with exhibits, nature and history programs
James River State Park	Gladstone	Buckingham	Central	1,500 acres, visitor center features an aquarium, replica bateau, history exhibits, seasonal nature programs
Jerome "Buddie" Ford Nature Center	Alexandria	Alexandria	Northern	website, operated by the City in 50-acre Dora Kelley Nature Park
Joseph S. J. Tanner Environmental Education Center	Boydton	Mecklenburg	Central Virginia	website, natural history of John H. Kerr Reservoir
Long Branch Park and Nature Center	Arlington	Arlington	Northern	website, 17 acres, operated by the City at Glencarlyn Park
Maymont Park	Richmond	Richmond	Greater Richmond Region	100 acre Victorian estate, park features a nature center dedicated to native Virginia wildlife, a historic house museum, arboretum, formal gardens, carriage collection and petting zoo
Mill Mountain Discovery Center	Roanoke	Roanoke	Southwest Virginia	website, operated by the City in the 611-acre Mill Mountain Park
Motts Run Nature Center	Fredericksburg	Fredericksburg	Northern	website, owned by the city and operated seasonally by volunteers in the 860-acre Motts Run Reservoir Recreation Area
Potomac Overlook Regional Park and Nature Center	Arlington	Arlington	Northern	website, 70 acres, operated by the Northern Virginia Regional Park Authority, energy and natural history exhibits, live animals
Riverbend Park	Great Falls	Fairfax	Northern	website, over 400 acres, operated by the county, visitor center self-guided activities for children, live animal displays and natural and cultural exhibits
Rockfish Valley Foundation	Wintergreen	Nelson County	Central	website, 20 acres of trails, parks, river and creek access, and children's nature play area, plus indoor natural history center
Rockwood Nature Center	Richmond	Chesterfield	Greater Richmond Region	website, 160 acres, operated by the County in Rockwood Park
Rust Sanctuary	Leesburg	Loudoun	Northern	website, 68 acres, operated by the Audubon Naturalist Society
Sandy Bottom Nature Park	Hampton	Hampton	Hampton Roads	website, 456-acre environmental education and wildlife management facility, operated by the City
Three Lakes Park & Nature Center	Richmond	Henrico	Greater Richmond Region	website, operated by the County
Virginia Living Museum	Newport News	Newport News	Hampton Roads	Natural history museum of indigenous animals, aviary, outdoor animal displays, botanical preserve and planetarium
Walker Nature Center	Reston	Fairfax	Northern	website, 72 acres, operated by the community, 2 miles of trails
Woodpecker Ridge Nature Center	Fincastle	Botetourt	Southwest Virginia	information, 70 acres, privately owned preserve and bird-watching site

== Defunct centers ==
- Smithsonian Institution Naturalist Center, Leesburg
