= Boykin's Tavern =

Historic commercial building in Virginia, United States

- U.S. National Register of Historic Places
- Virginia Landmarks Register
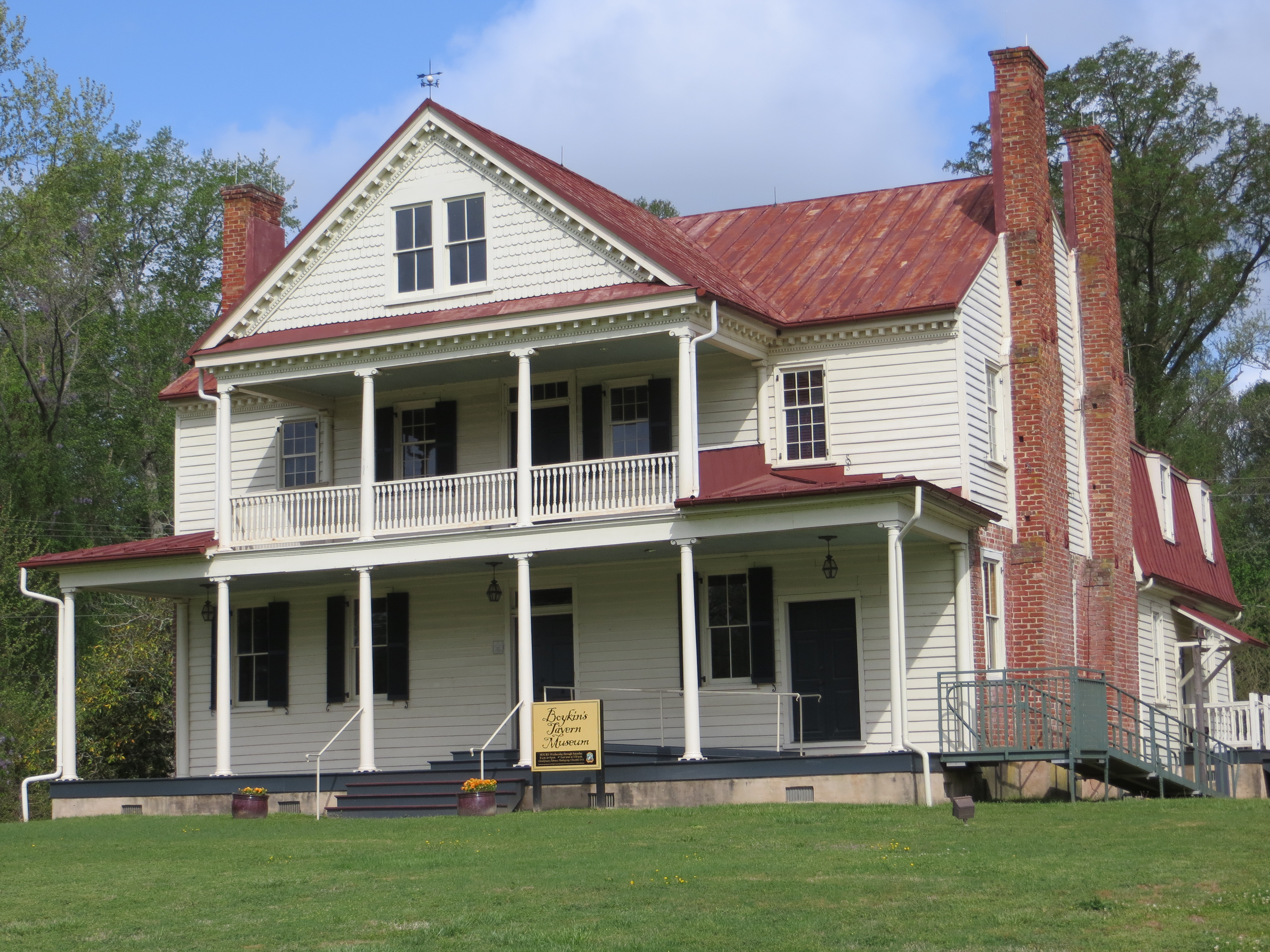
- Boykin's Tavern, April 2013

- Location within Virginia Location within the United States
- Location: W of U.S. 258, 17130 Monument Circle, Isle of Wight, Virginia
- Coordinates: 36°54′27″N 76°42′34″W
- Area: less than one acre
- Built: c. 1790, 1900–1902
- Built by: Boykin, Col. F.
- Architectural style: Colonial, Federal
- NRHP reference No.: 74002131
- VLR No.: 046-0028

Significant dates
- Added to NRHP: June 19, 1974
- Designated VLR: May 21, 1974

Boykin's Tavern is a historic inn and tavern located at Isle of Wight, Isle of Wight County, Virginia. The original structure was built about 1790, and expanded to two stories with a 1 1/2-story gambrel-roofed wing in the early 19th century. A two-story wing and two-story porch were added in 1900–1902. It has four brick external end chimneys and a standing seam metal gable roof. The interior reflects the transition between the Colonial and Federal styles. It is the only surviving structure associated with the Isle of Wight Courthouse of 1800. The building is occupied by a local history museum.

It was listed on the National Register of Historic Places in 1974.
