= Alexander Black House =

House in United States of America

Coordinates: 37°13′39.6″N 80°24′50.4″W

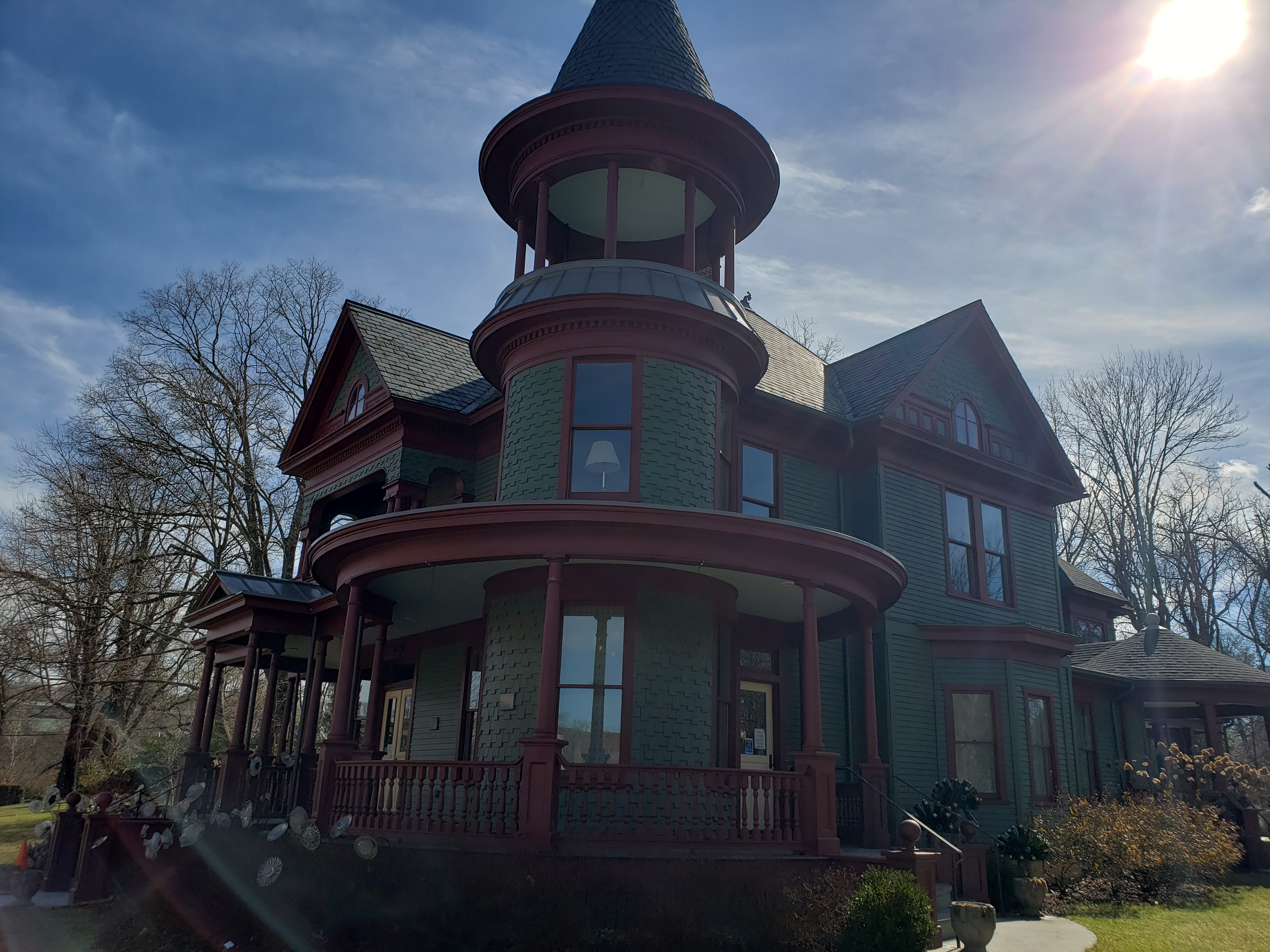
Alexander Black House.jpg

The Alexander Black House is a historical house in the Queen Anne Victorian architectural style, located in Blacksburg, Virginia, United States.

== History ==
The house was built around 1897. The owner, Alexander Black, was a great-great-grandson of Samuel Black, who bought the land on which Blacksburg is now located. Alexander Black was a prominent businessman in the town, and his first house reflected the typical design of homes in Blacksburg at the time. When that house burned down, he chose to build a new house in the Queen Anne style. The house features elements such as steep cross-gabled roofs, gingerbread trim, towers, and vertical windows.

The Black family lived in the house until 1935, when Alexander Black died. The house was then used as a funeral home until 2002. To accommodate its use as a funeral home, the wraparound porch was enclosed, and some interior walls were removed to provide gathering areas. The second-floor balcony and some of the bay windows were enclosed as well, and the house was given vinyl siding.

== Museum ==
In 2002, the town proposed a retail development named Kent Square for the downtown area. The site of the Alexander Black House was planned to be occupied by a 400-stall parking garage. The town council allocated $2 million toward development of the parking garage, and they also purchased the house and made plans for its preservation. The town council then had the house moved to a new location on Draper Road and began the restoration process.

In 2008, Blacksburg officials began considering an expansion of the National Register of Historic Places District in the town, likely including the Alexander Black House. Plans began to restore the Alexander Black House for use as the Blacksburg Museum.

In 2014 a thorough restoration of the house was completed.
