= James Madison Museum =

Museum dedicated to the Founding Father and 4th president of the United States

Coordinates: 38°14′36.1″N 78°6′46.9″W

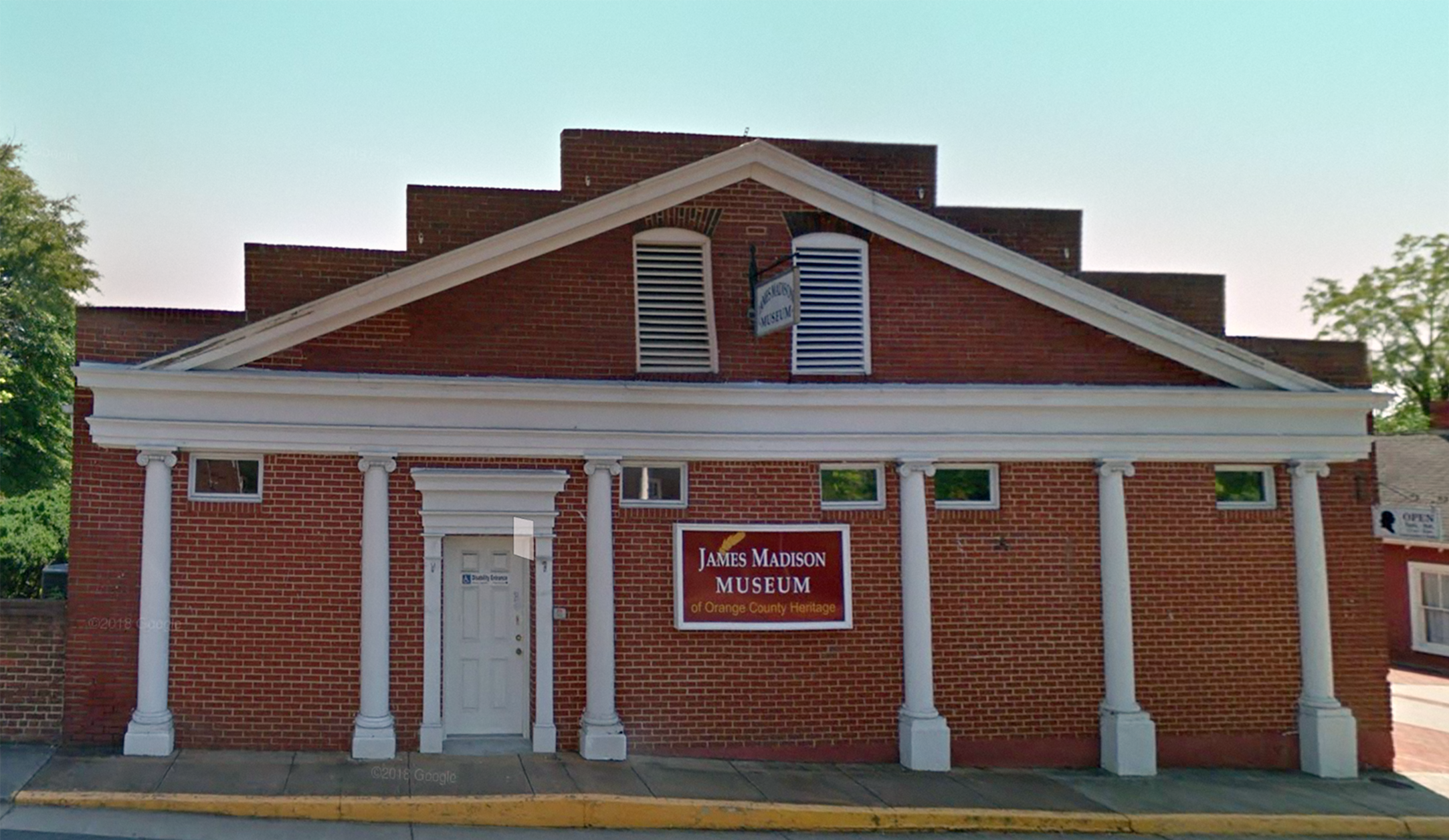
The James Madison Museum in 2017

The James Madison Museum located in Orange, Virginia is a museum dedicated to the Founding Father and 4th president of the United States James Madison and his wife, Dolley Madison. Exhibits include original furniture used by James Madison, his personal items, portraits of the Madisons, and a statue.

Due to Madison's reputation as a farmer, the museum also features a collection of antique farm tools. There is also a partially reconstructed 1733 house to demonstrate building practices.

== See also ==
- Montpelier (Orange, Virginia)
