= Eastern Shore Railway Museum =

Museum in Parksley, Virginia

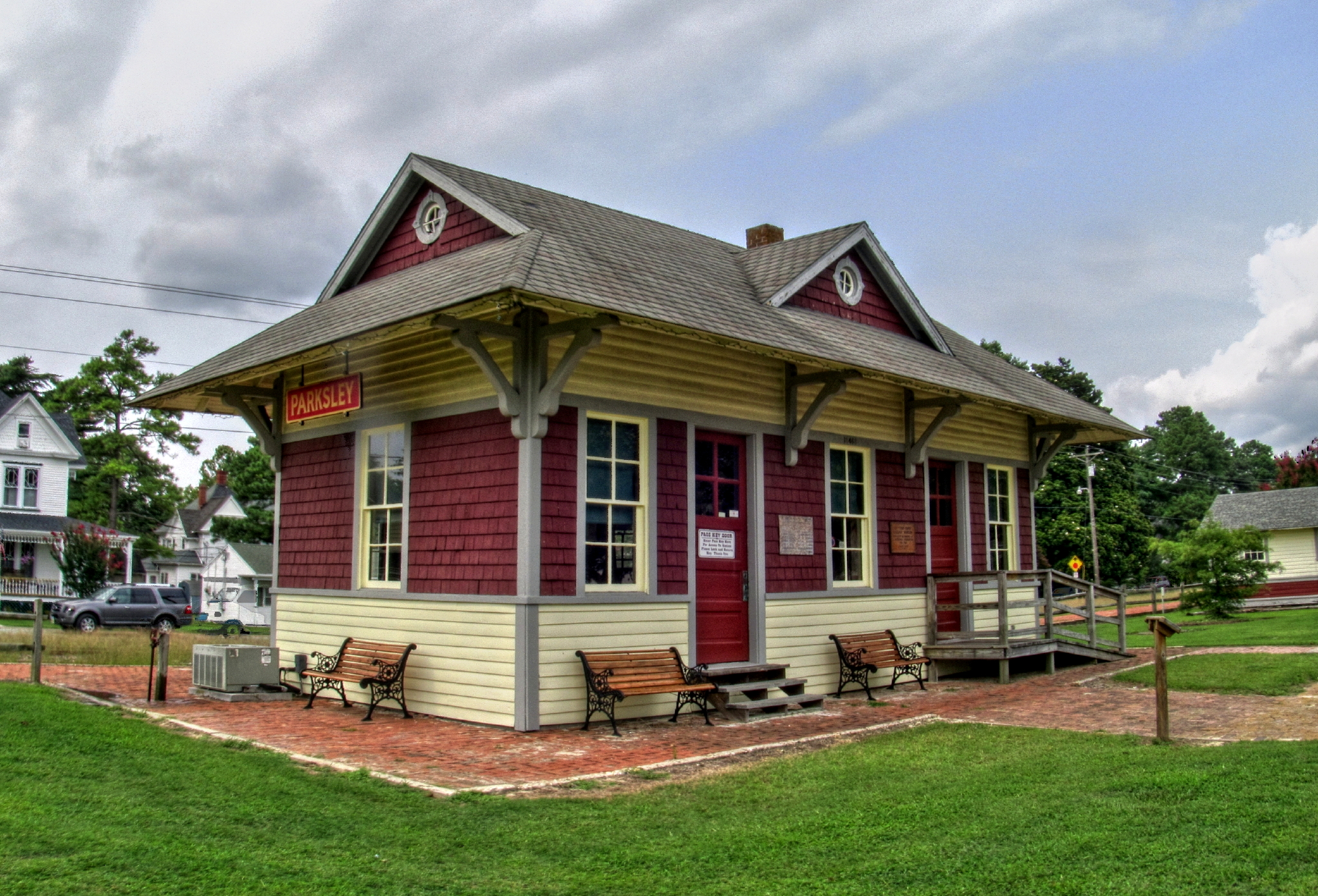
- The former Hopeton, Virginia station was moved to Parksley and restored as part of the Eastern Shore Railway museum
- Established: 1988
- Location: 18468 Dunne Avenue; Parksley, Virginia
- Coordinates: 37.784°N 75.652°W
- Type: Rail

The Eastern Shore Railway Museum is located at 18568 Dunne Avenue, Parksley, Virginia, United States. The museum exhibits historic trains and equipment. The museum also contains a restored train station with railroad memorabilia from the lines that operated on the Eastern Shore of Virginia.

The ESRM is open from noon until 4 p.m., Wednesday through Saturday, from March through October, and housed in a restored 1906 Pennsylvania Railroad passenger station. On its siding are two cabooses, a baggage car, a Pullman sleeper, Seaboard 6106, a Budd dining car, a 1913 wooden box car and the Diplomat, an observation car. The museum also includes an 1890s maintenance-of-way tool shed, a crossing guard shanty, and various railroad artifacts. The ESRM no longer maintains a website but it does have a Facebook page.

ESRM museum members were affiliated with the Delmarva Chapter NRHS who had staffed the annual train excursions in held on the first Saturday of October in Hurlock, Maryland. In recent years they were replaced by Wilmington Chapter NRHS members as the Parksley Chapter became depleted by the aging and death of its members.

ESRM members also took part in the annual Santa trains operated by the Bay Coast Railroad each year on the first Saturday in December. The train consisted of one Bay Coast locomotive pulling the museum's Fairfax River, a stainless steel Pullman car, and it start at the BCR's southern end at Cape Charles, Virginia at 9 a.m. and head north, stopping at Cheriton (9:50 a.m.), Eastville (10:40 a.m.), Nassawadox (11:45 a.m.), Exmore (12:30 p.m.), Painter (1:35 p.m.), Melfa (2:25 p.m.), Onley (3:30 p.m.), and Parksley (5 p.m.). Problems with the car's wheels prevented the train from running in December 2017 and in May 2018 the Bay Coast ceased operating entirely.

The demise of the Bay Coast has left the ESRM in danger of becoming rail-isolated from the national railroad network. At present the BCR's tracks are still in place; however, they were in a poor state of maintenance prior to the BCR's end of operations and subsequent filing for abandonment, and they would need millions of dollars in repairs to restore them to a satisfactory state. Richard Lewis, president of Associated Grain in Parksley, has asked that the Delmarva Central Railroad reopen the track south from its current terminus in Hallwood, Virginia, 11 miles to the north, to serve his facility. To date the DCR has said no, that the cost to restore the track would be too much and, despite the promise of 250 cars for three years, the DCR would lose money on each car. If rail service to Parksley can be restored, the ESRM will be able to maintain its connection to the national railroad network. If not, it will become rail-isolated.

In January 2020 the Diplomat, one of the museum's older exhibits, was to be trucked to the Colebrookdale Railroad in Boyertown, Pennsylvania and renovated for excursion use. Complications arose regarding the car's shipment and, over a year later, the car remained at the museum. In mid-March 2021 the Colebrookdale Railroad confirmed it still intended to acquire and move the car to Pennsylvania, and the ESRM has stated the current plan was for the car to be shipped on April 13, 2021. A March 30, 2021 announcement on the ESRM's Facebook page, however, stated that the Colebrookdale Railroad had changed its mind and declined to acquire the car.

While the Diplomat has been on display at the museum, it is actually owned by the Delmarva Chapter NRHS and it has been on loan to the museum. Due to the aging and deaths of most of its members, the Chapter has become almost completely dormant and unable to maintain its rail car.

In July, however, the Colebrookdale Railroad changed their mind again, and on July 23, the Diplomat began its journey to Boyertown by truck.
