= Big Otter Mill =

- U.S. National Register of Historic Places
- Virginia Landmarks Register
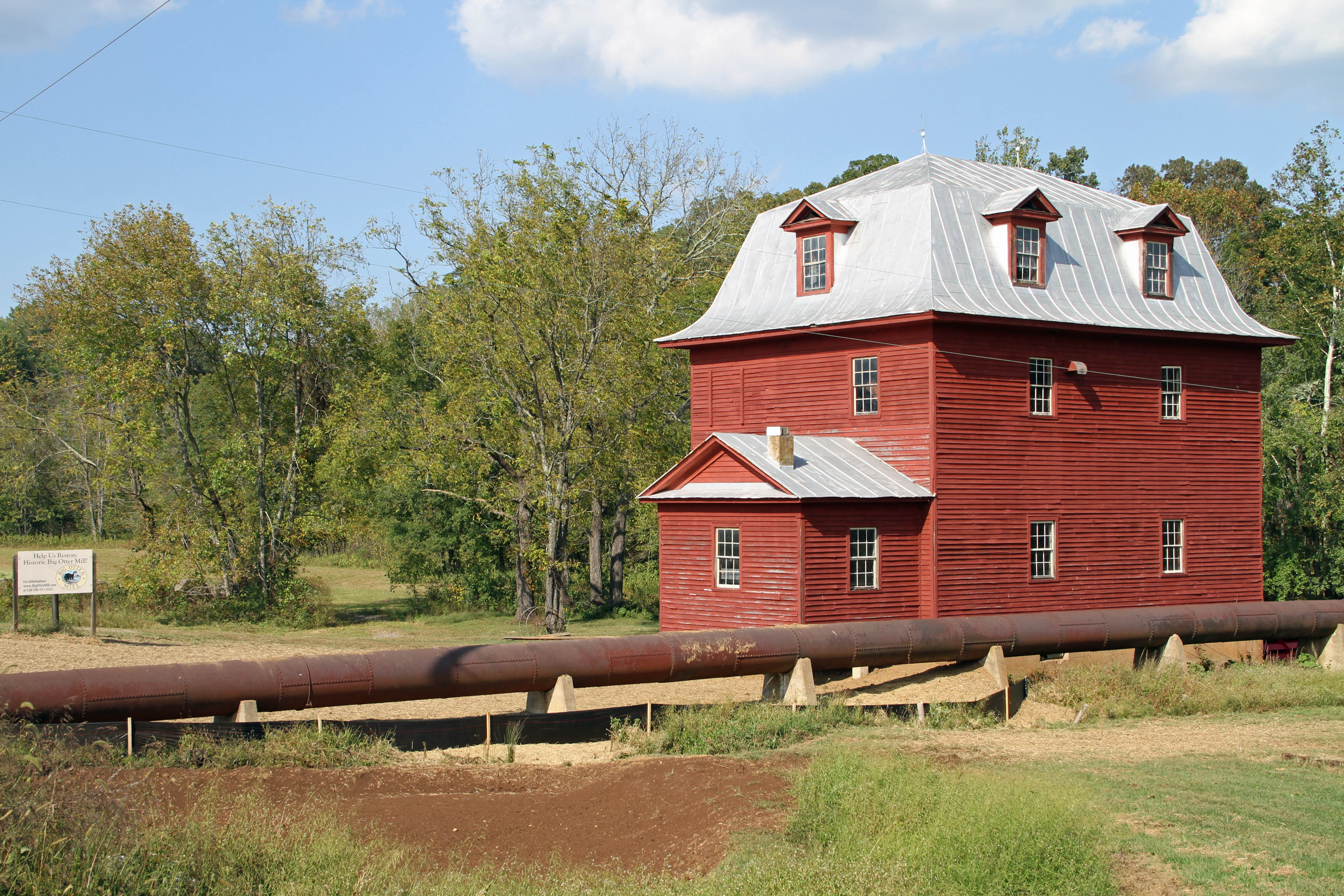
- Big Otter Mill, September 2012

- Location within Virginia Location within the United States
- Location: VA 122, near Bedford, Virginia
- Coordinates: 37°23′27″N 79°30′14″W
- Area: 1.7 acres (0.69 ha)
- Built: 1920
- Built by: Forbes, John; Forbes, Reed
- Architectural style: Grist mill
- NRHP reference No.: 98001314
- VLR No.: 009-0152

Significant dates
- Added to NRHP: October 30, 1998
- Designated VLR: September 14, 1998

Big Otter Mill, also known as Forbes Mill, is a historic grist mill located near Bedford, Bedford County, Virginia, USA. It was built about 1920 and is a large, 2½-story, mortise-and-tenon framed mill building, topped by an unusual and picturesque mansard roof. The mill retains a nearly complete set of early-20th century machinery, including a 13-feet diameter water wheel, which was used until the late 1940s. Also on the property are a contributing mill race and the foundation of a store. The building is under restoration as a mill museum.

It was listed on the National Register of Historic Places in 1998.
