= Stage Door Gallery =

- Location: 301 Mason Avenue; Cape Charles, Virginia
- Coordinates: 37°16′2.2″N 76°1′3″W
- Type: Art

The Stage Door Gallery is located at 301 Mason Avenue, Cape Charles, Virginia, United States. The gallery contains rotating exhibits of works by local artists. The gallery contains 2,500 square feet (230 m^{2}) of floor space.

== History ==
In November 2007, the Stage Door Gallery moved from 10 Strawberry Street, Cape Charles to its current location.

== See also ==
- Historic Palace Theatre
