= Blacksburg Museum and Cultural Foundation =

Coordinates: 37.233722°N 80.421105°W

The Blacksburg Museum and Cultural Foundation is a cultural institution in the Town of Blacksburg, Virginia, that sponsors exhibits, concerts, lecture series, and other cultural activities. The museum is headquartered in the Alexander Black House. The BM&CF also consists of the St. Luke & Odd Fellows Hall, a museum of African-American heritage in Blacksburg.

== History and progress ==
In 1798, the Town of Blacksburg was laid out in a 16-square grid, which covered a 38-acre (150,000 m^{2}) land plot bordered on four sides by Jackson, Draper, Clay and Wharton Streets. Many of the blocks now have different businesses located there, but a committee has been established to promote community awareness about the historical significance of many different locations downtown, especially the Alexander Black House.

== Mission ==
The mission of the Blacksburg Museum and Cultural Foundation is to preserve, interpret and promote Blacksburg's art, history and cultural heritage.
