= Odd Fellows Hall (Blacksburg, Virginia) =

- U.S. National Register of Historic Places
- Virginia Landmarks Register
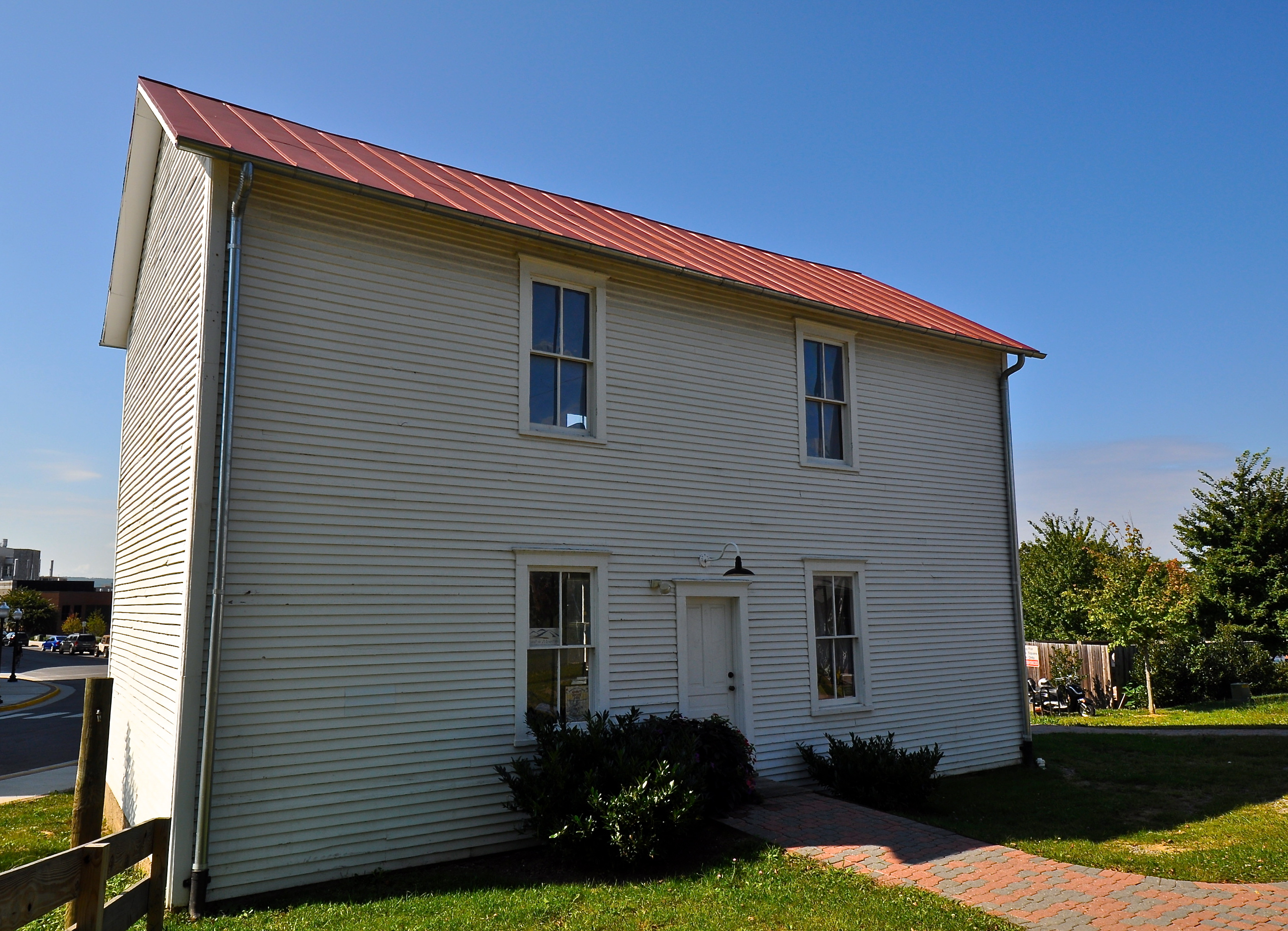
- The hall in 2013

- Location within Virginia Location within the United States
- Location: 203 Gilbert St., Blacksburg, Virginia
- Coordinates: 37°14′9″N 80°25′16″W
- Area: 0.1 acres (0.040 ha)
- Built: 1905
- NRHP reference No.: 05000770
- VLR No.: 150-0087

Significant dates
- Added to NRHP: July 27, 2005
- Designated VLR: June 1, 2005

The Odd Fellows Hall, also known as Tadmore Light Lodge, No. 6184, is a historic Grand United Order of Odd Fellows meeting hall located at Blacksburg, Montgomery County, Virginia. It was built in 1905, and is a two-story frame structure clad in painted weatherboard siding. It has a standing seam metal gable roof. The building served throughout the early- to mid-20th century as the social center of the local African-American community.

It was listed on the National Register of Historic Places in 2005.
