= Wolf Creek Indian Village and Museum =

Reconstructed Native American village in Virginia, United States

Coordinates: 37°10′51″N 81°08′14″W

Wolf Creek Indian Village and Museum is a reconstruction of a Native American village, approximately dating from 1480-1520. The ethnicity of the Native Americans who lived in the village is unknown. They could have been Cherokee, or one of the Siouan languages tribes that frequented the area.

== Archaeology ==
In 1970 during the construction of Interstate 77 near Bastian, Virginia, a Native American archaeological site was discovered, and construction was halted while a Rescue archaeology and field survey of the site was completed. The Wolf Creek bed was to be diverted and the original site would be destroyed during the highway's construction. "In May 1970, Howard MacCord led the excavation of the site. The construction of the interstate was stopped for a very brief time to complete the dig. It was the first official state recognized archeology site (State # 44BD1) in Bland County and named for Brown Johnston who owned the farm the site was located on."

The archaeological catalog includes eleven skeletons, the remains of eleven circular buildings or wigwams, some storage huts and fire pits.

The archaeological techniques were hurried because of the short window of time allowed for the site survey. Road graders were used to remove the upper levels of dirt, and work was done in the evenings by turning car headlights toward the areas that were worked and examined.

== Reconstruction ==
Between 1992 and 1996, a reconstruction of the village was completed in Bland County, Virginia, near the original site. The life-sized reconstruction is based on the post hole pits, postal stain and post molds that were uncovered during the survey, which indicated a palisaded enclosure and some dozen circular buildings. Several Native American graves of various ages and genders were also discovered, some placed inside the palisades, and some placed outside the enclosure. These grave sites are accurately positioned and marked in the reconstructed village, along with a description of the burial position and any grave goods also discovered.

From the archaeological site map and earlier survey, attempts were made to make it as authentic a reconstruction as possible. "Using the archaeology map, we have pole for pole and feature for feature recreated the village..."

Wolf Creek Indian Village & Museum is owned and operated by County of Bland, VA

In replicating the historical site, reenactors and living history interpreters are used to inform the public of life during the period when the village was used.

== Bibliography ==
- Galloway, William U. Center for Eastern American Indian Culture, Bland County, Virginia: Schematic Design Proposal—Final Report. [Blacksburg, Va.]: Community Design Assistance Center, 1992. 36 leaves: illustrations, maps, plans (some folded); prepared by Community Design Assistance Center, College of Architecture and Urban Studies, Virginia Polytechnic Institute and State University.
- MacCord, Howard. The Brown Johnston Site, Bland County, Virginia. S.l: s.n.], 1990. Reprint. Originally published in Quarterly Bulletin - Archeological Society of Virginia, vol. 25, no. 4, June 1971. Wolf Creek Indian Village.
