= Museum of American Presidents =

Coordinates: 38.988741°N 78.358634°W

The Museum of American Presidents located in Strasburg, Virginia, is a museum which tells about Virginia's influence on the Presidency.
