= Mount Olive, Virginia =

- CDP
- Interactive map of Mount Olive, Virginia
- Coordinates: 38°58′41″N 78°27′25″W
- Country: United States
- State: Virginia
- County: Shenandoah
- Time zone: UTC−5 (Eastern (EST))
  - Summer (DST): UTC−4 (EDT)
- FIPS code: 51-04928
- GNIS feature ID: 2830687

Mount Olive is a census-designated place in Shenandoah County, in the U.S. state of Virginia.
