= Cape Charles Museum and Welcome Center =

Museum in Virginia, United States

- Established: 1996
- Location: 814 Randolph Avenue; Cape Charles, Virginia
- Coordinates: 37.2679°N 76.0083°W
- Type: History
- Website: Cape Charles Museum and Welcome Center

The Cape Charles Museum and Welcome Center is located at 814 Randolph Avenue, Cape Charles, Virginia, United States. The museum contains exhibits detailing the history and development of Cape Charles and the surrounding region. A large Busch-Sulzer engine and Westinghouse generator serve as the centerpieces of the museum.
