= Plumb House (Waynesboro, Virginia) =

Historic house in Virginia, United States

- U.S. National Register of Historic Places
- Virginia Landmarks Register
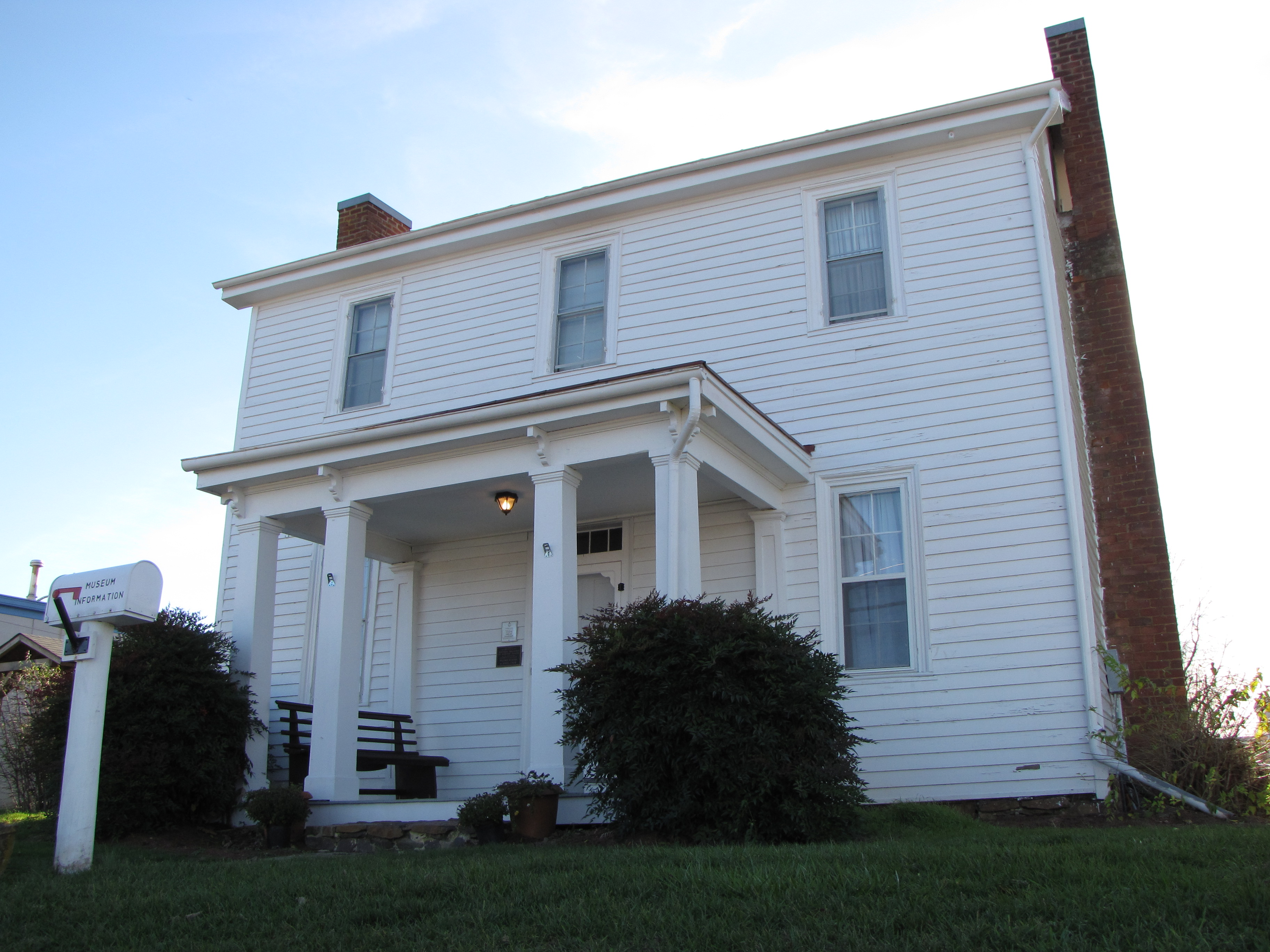
- Plumb House

- Location within Virginia Location within the United States
- Location: 1012 W. Main Street; Waynesboro, Virginia
- Coordinates: 38°4′11.2″N 78°53′44.1″W
- Built: Circa 1810-1820
- Architectural style: Federal
- NRHP reference No.: 90002178
- VLR No.: 136-0003

Significant dates
- Added to NRHP: January 24, 1991
- Designated VLR: February 20, 1990

The Plumb House is a historic U.S. home located at 1012 West Main Street, Waynesboro, Virginia. The house currently serves as the Plumb House Museum and is operated by the Waynesboro Heritage Foundation.

== Plumb House Museum ==
The Plumb House Museum provides information on the Plumb family that lived in the house for five generations and a history of the Battle of Waynesboro, Virginia fought nearby in 1865 during the American Civil War.
