= Meadow Farm =

Historic house in Virginia, United States

- U.S. National Register of Historic Places
- Virginia Landmarks Register
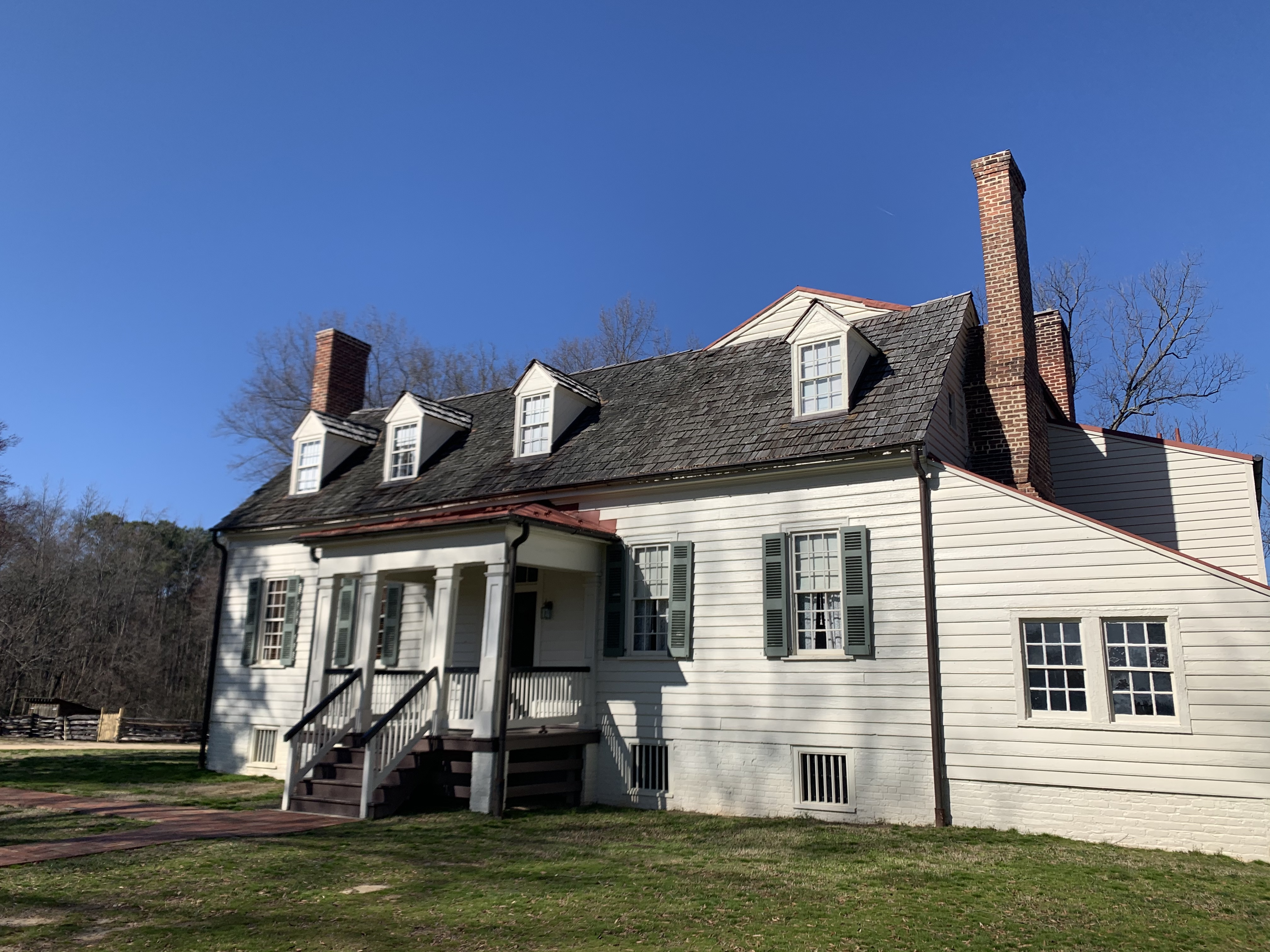

- Location within Virginia Location within the United States
- Location: Mountain and Courtney Rds., Glen Allen, Virginia
- Coordinates: 37°40′32″N 77°31′2″W
- Area: 175 acres (71 ha)
- Built: 1800
- NRHP reference No.: 74002125
- VLR No.: 043-0031

Significant dates
- Added to NRHP: August 13, 1974
- Designated VLR: May 20, 1974

Meadow Farm is a historic farm and estate in Henrico County, Virginia. It is best known for its role in Gabriel's Revolution. The main farmhouse was built in the early nineteenth century and is a well preserved example of small Virginia farms of the time. It was listed in the National Register of Historic Places in 1974. The property is now owned and operated by Henrico County as the Meadow Farm Museum.

== History ==
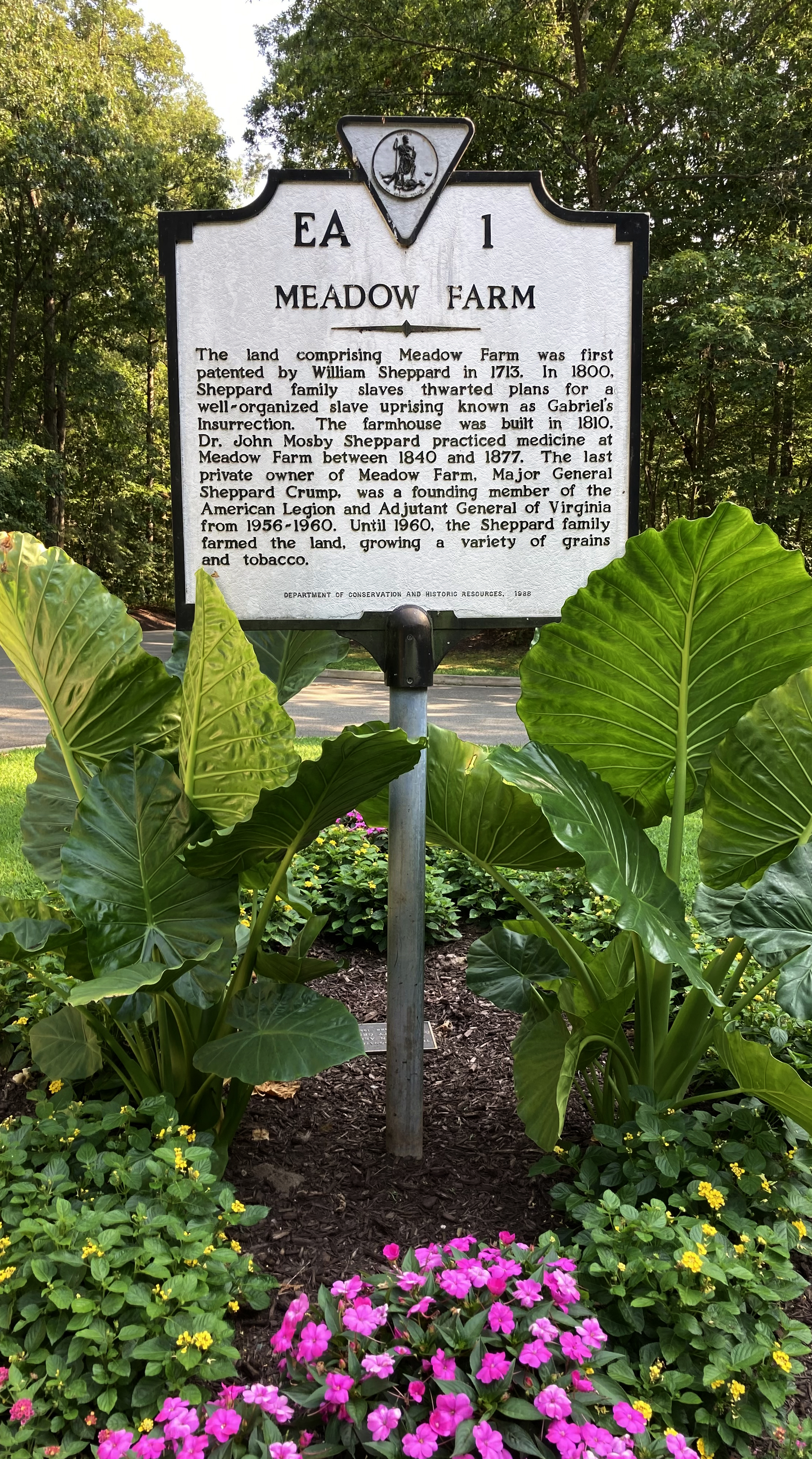
Virginia historical marker at Meadow Farm, a historic park in Henrico County, Virginia.

Prior to European contact, the land was used by bands of Native American tribes for thousands of years for hunting and trading. Starting in the early eighteenth century, Meadow Farm was owned by several generations of the Sheppard family. The Sheppard family raised livestock and grew crops, primarily wheat, and corn. In 1800, two enslaved men to Mosby Sheppard named Thom and Pharaoh informed Mosby Sheppard about a planned slave revolt. Mosby Sheppard informed then-governor James Monroe, who halted the rebellion before it could begin. Mosby Sheppard later served in the Virginia Militia for the War of 1812.

Doctor John Mosby Sheppard, son of Mosby Sheppard, later purchased the estate. John Sheppard practiced medicine on the site and a period building, representing his medical office, stands today. John Sheppard's grandson, General Sheppard Crump, was the last of the Sheppard family to live at Meadow Farm. After Sheppard Crump died, his widow lived in the house until eventually donating the property to Henrico County.

== Architecture ==
The main dwelling at Meadow Farm is a story-and-a-half frame house. The house is a well preserved farm house of its time and important interior details survive such as the stairs and banisters, mantels, baseboards, and floors. The house has a gabled roof with exterior end chimneys. There is Greek Revival porch on the house which dates to the 1840s. Later additions were made to the house, such as a shed wing and a large two-story wing on the rear.

== Meadow Farm Museum ==
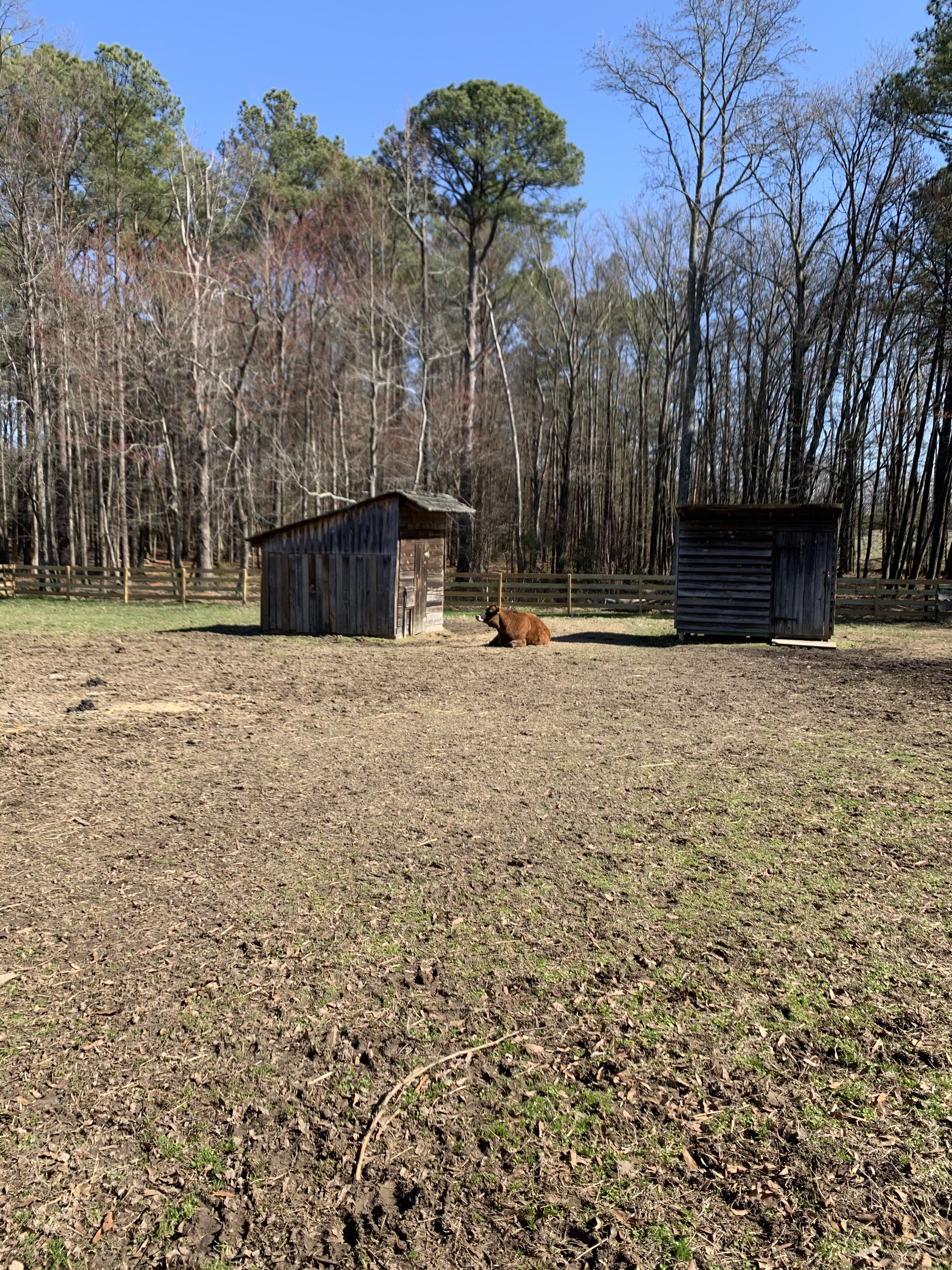
A cow at Meadow Farm Museum, 2020

The historic area and museum presents programs and exhibits on the history of Henrico County, Central Virginia, and cultures impacted at Meadow Farm. The buildings include the farmhouse, barn, doctor's office, tobacco barn, smokehouse, and springhouse. The museum is featured in "Welcome to the Meadow Farm Museum", a 10-minute Henrico County TV film available for viewing online.
