= Bassett Hall =

18th-century farmhouse in Williamsburg, Virginia

Coordinates: 37°16′14.85″N 76°41′34.97″W

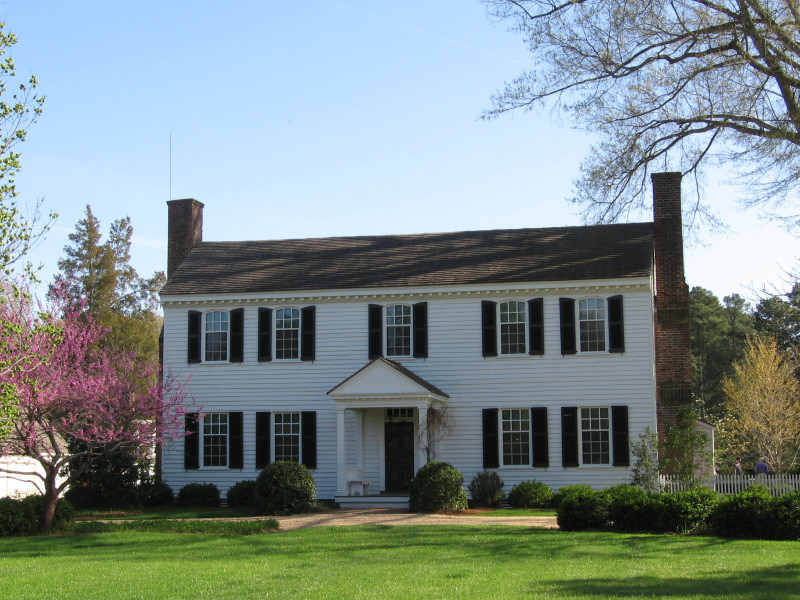
Bassett Hall

Bassett Hall is an 18th-century farmhouse located in Williamsburg, Virginia. It was the home of John D. Rockefeller Jr. and his wife Abby Aldrich Rockefeller during the restoration of Colonial Williamsburg.

== Early history ==
The house was built by Philip Johnson, a member of the Virginia House of Burgesses, between 1753 and 1766. It was named for Martha Washington's nephew, Burwell Bassett, who purchased the house in 1800.

During the Civil War, the Union cavalryman George Armstrong Custer was a guest in the home for 10 days. Custer was in town to attend the wedding of a West Point classmate, a Confederate who had been wounded in the Battle of Williamsburg.

== Rockefeller Home ==
In 1926, Rev. Dr. W.A.R. Goodwin of Bruton Parish Church approached philanthropist John D. Rockefeller Jr. with the idea of preserving and restoring the historic buildings of Williamsburg. After strolling through the great trees behind Bassett Hall in contemplation, Rockefeller agreed. Goodwin later suggested:

I wish you would buy Bassett Hall for yourself. It would give you a charming vantage point from which to play with the vision and dream which you see.

Bassett Hall became the Rockefellers' residence during their twice-annual visits to Williamsburg.

== Open to the Public ==
The Rockefeller family bequeathed Bassett Hall to Colonial Williamsburg in 1979. The home is now open to the public and appears much as it did in the 1930s and 1940s when the Rockefellers made it their home. The gardens are in the Colonial Revival style.
