= Camera Heritage Museum (Staunton, Virginia) =

Camera museum

Coordinates: 38.14961°N 79.07278°W

The Camera Heritage Museum is a photographic technology museum located in Staunton, Virginia.

== History ==
The Camera Heritage Museum was founded in 2011 by camera collector David Schwartz. As of 2025 it holds over 7000 unique cameras in its collection.

The museum has permanent displays showing the history of analog cameras, including Kodak Brownies and spy cameras. Over two thousand cameras are on display. The collection also includes historical photographs of the Shenandoah Valley region.
