= Virginia Living Museum =

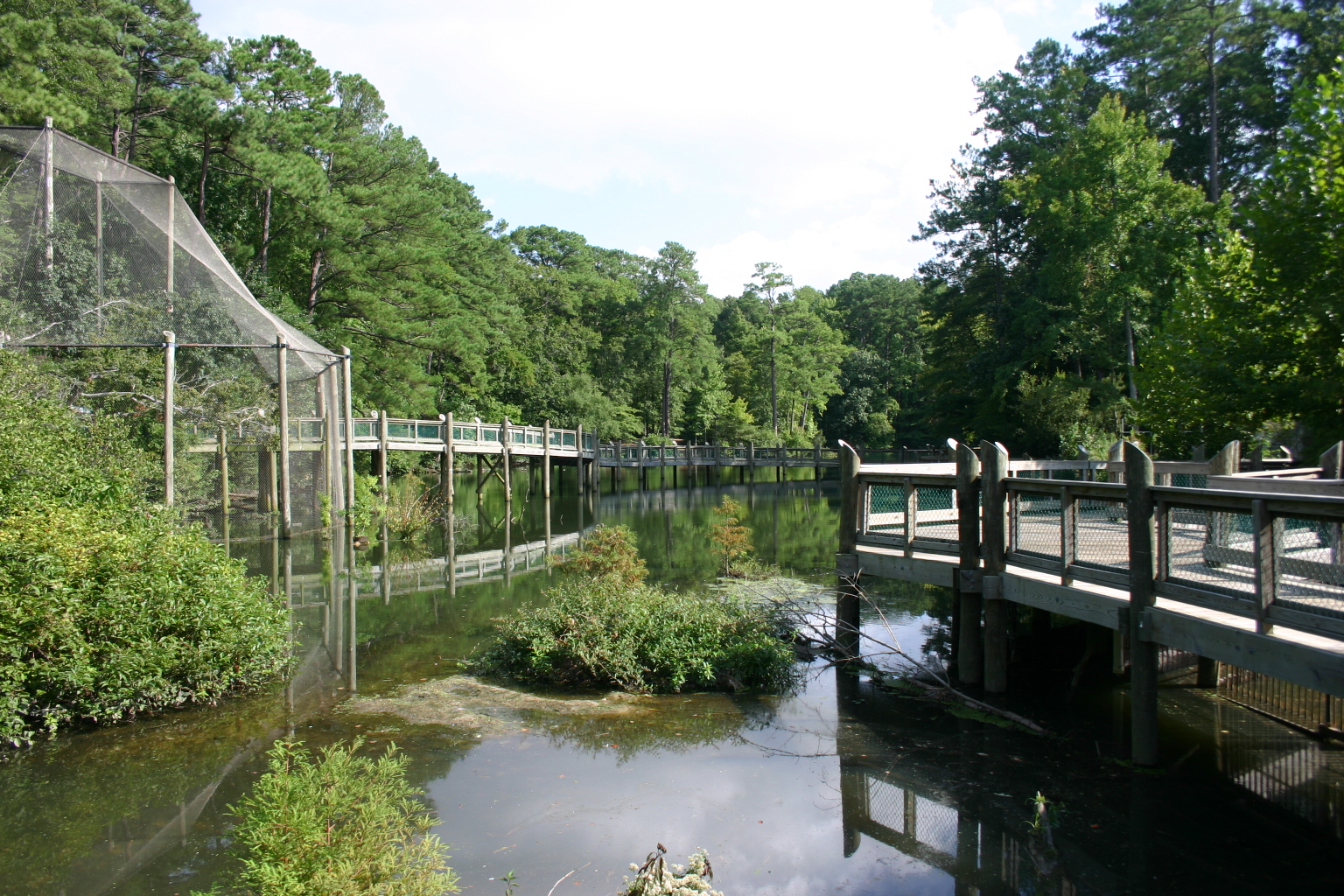
- Outdoor exhibits around the lake at the Virginia Living Museum
- Interactive map of Virginia Living Museum
- 37.070020°N 76.479696°W
- Date opened: 1966 (founded); 1987 (as Virginia Living Museum)
- Location: Newport News, Virginia, United States
- No. of species: 254+
- Memberships: Association of Zoos and Aquariums; American Alliance of Museums
- Website: thevlm.org

The Virginia Living Museum is an open-air museum located in Newport News, Virginia that has many living exhibits of Virginia's indigenous species. The exhibits include aspects of an aquarium, science center, aviary, botanical preserve and planetarium.

== History ==
The first incarnation of what is now the Virginia Living Museum was the Junior Nature Museum and Planetarium, opened in 1966 under Virginia Governor Mills E. Godwin, Jr. and cofounded by the Junior League of Hampton Roads and the Warwick Rotary Club. In 1976, the facility was expanded and a new focus on physical and applied sciences was added to the existing natural sciences; at this time it was renamed the Peninsula Nature and Science Center.

The museum began its transformation to a "living museum", incorporating living exhibits and preservation land together with traditional exhibits, in 1983, following the example of the Arizona-Sonora Desert Museum. It reopened as the Virginia Living Museum in 1987 under Virginia governor Gerald L. Baliles. The museum expanded throughout the 1990s, opening the Coastal Plain Aviary in 2001 and a 62,000-square-foot (5,800 m^{2}) museum building in 2004.

== Exhibits ==
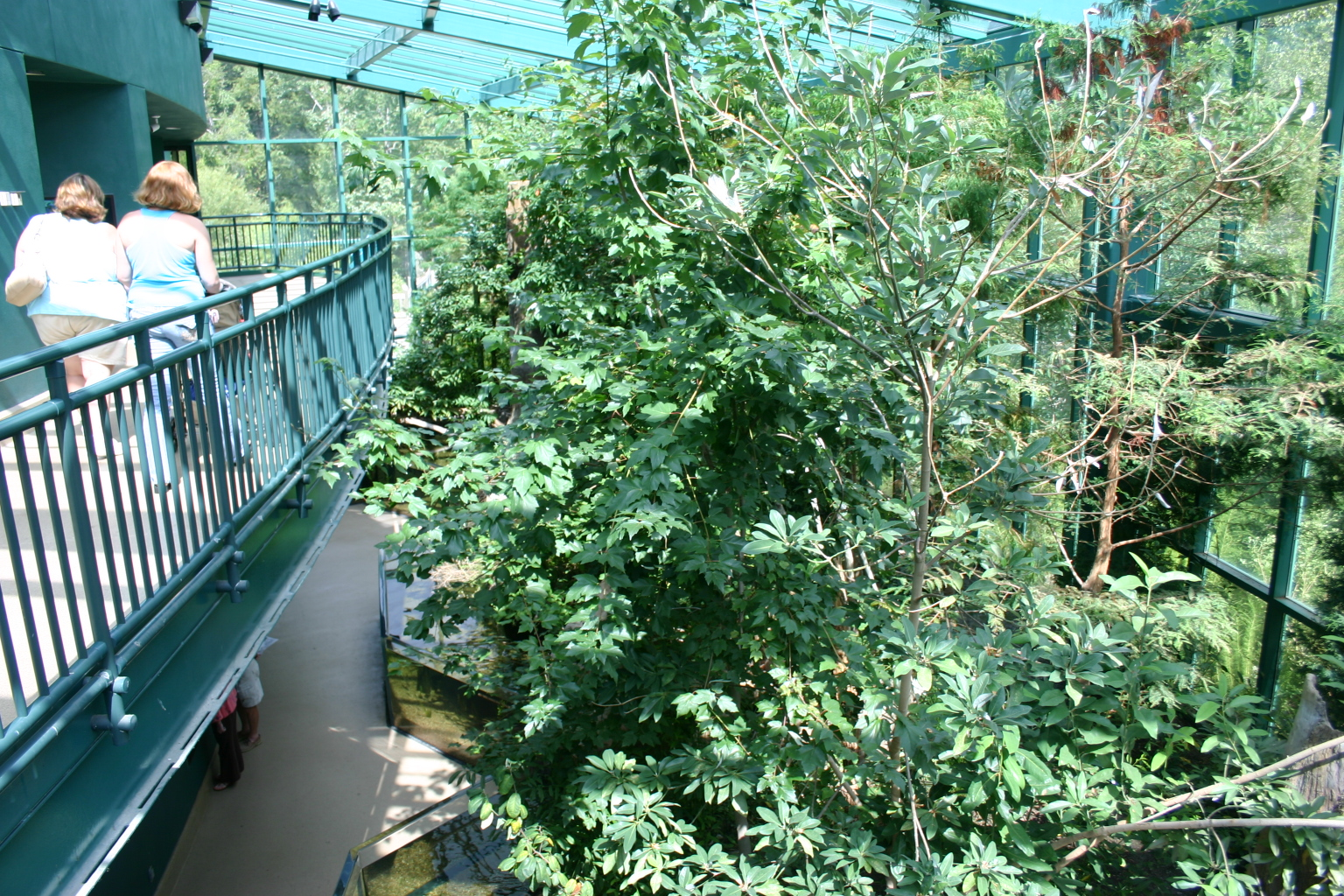
Two-story indoor exhibit of a cypress swamp at the museum

The main building features animals living in several exhibits that depict the many environments of Virginia, including the coastal plain, a 30,000 US gallons (110,000 L) Chesapeake Bay exhibit, the Piedmont, an Appalachian Mountain cove, a cypress swamp, an underground and cave exhibit, as well as a gallery of nocturnal life.

Outdoors, the museum features a 5,500-square-foot (510 m^{2}) aviary, a waterfall trail, a butterfly garden, and a 3/4 mile boardwalk with animals living in their natural habitats, including bobcats, river otters, beavers, raccoons, foxes, coyotes, deer and red wolves.
