= Isle of Wight, Virginia =

Unincorporated community in Virginia, United States

- Unincorporated community
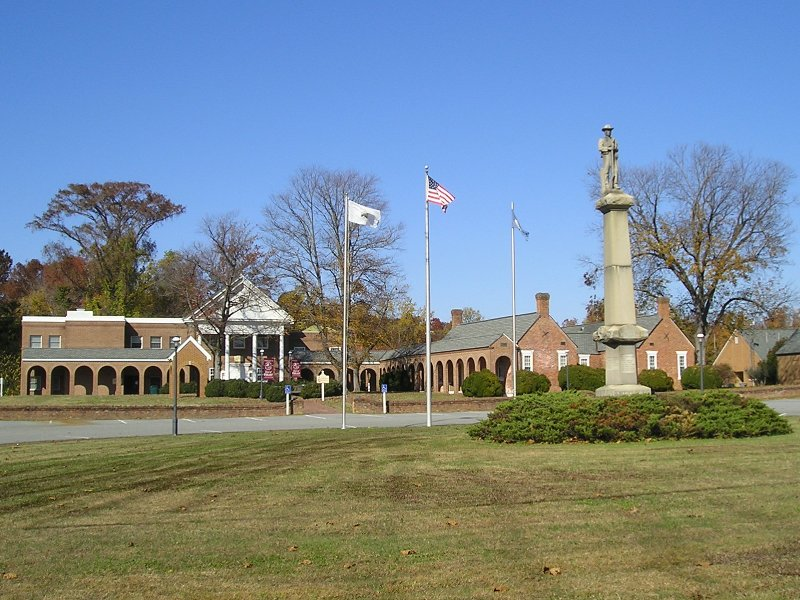
- Isle of Wight Courthouse and Confederate Monument (removed May 8, 2021).

- Location within the state of Virginia Isle of Wight (the United States)
- Coordinates: 36°54′28″N 76°42′28″W
- Country: United States
- State: Virginia
- County: Isle of Wight
- Elevation: 59 ft (18 m)
- Time zone: UTC−5 (Eastern (EST))
  - Summer (DST): UTC−4 (EDT)
- ZIP Codes: 23397
- GNIS ID: 1499599

Isle of Wight is an unincorporated community in and the county seat of Isle of Wight County, Virginia, United States. Originally, Isle of Wight County was named Warrosquyoake Shire. This was changed to the current name of Isle of Wight in 1637.
