= Beverley Kennon =

American naval officer (1793–1844)

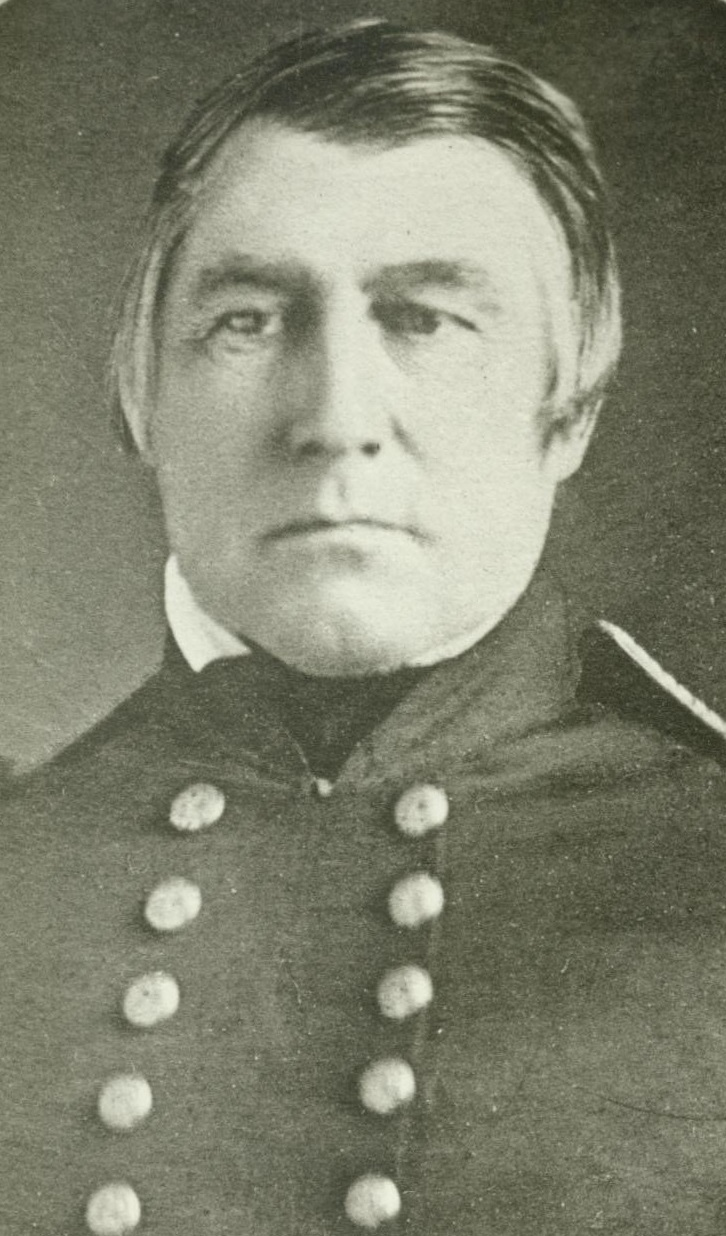
- Tudor Place Historic House & Garden likeness of Kennon, c. 1840
- Born: April 7, 1793; Mecklenburg County, Virginia, U.S.
- Died: February 28, 1844 (aged 50); At sea near Fort Washington, Maryland, U.S.
- Burial place: Congressional Cemetery, Washington, D.C. (Cenotaph); Oak Hill Cemetery, Washington, D.C.
- Spouse(s): Elizabeth Dandridge (died 1832) Britania Peter (m. 1842)
- Military career
- Allegiance: United States
- Branch: United States Navy
- Service years: 1809–1844
- Rank: Captain (Actual); Commodore (Customary)
- Commands: USS Vandalia; USS Macedonian; Washington Navy Yard; Bureau of Construction and Repair
- Conflicts: War of 1812; Second Barbary War

Beverley Kennon (April 7, 1793 – February 28, 1844) was a career officer in the United States Navy who attained the rank of captain as head of the Bureau of Construction and Repair. He died as a result of the explosion aboard USS Princeton.

== Biography ==
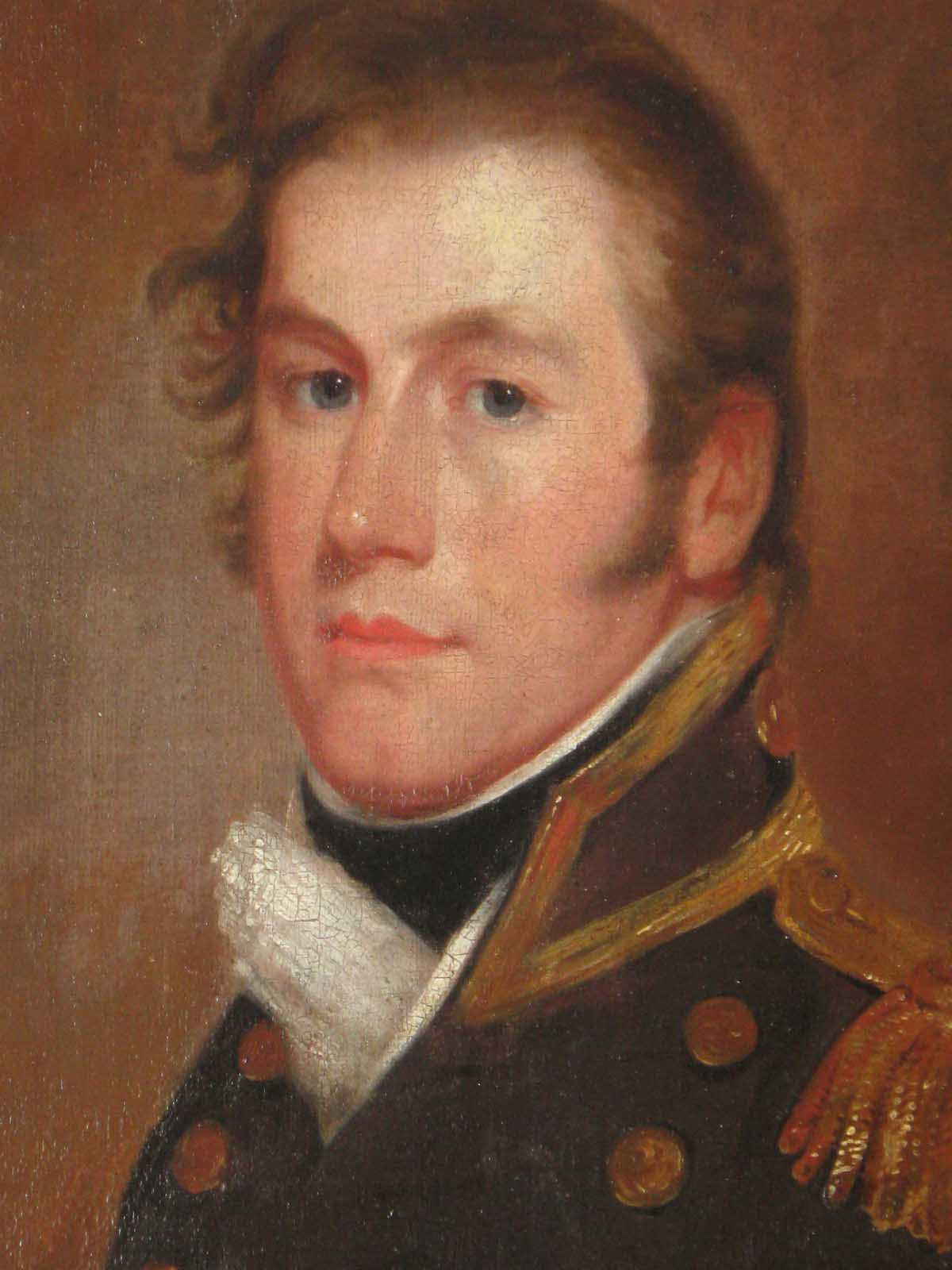
1820 likeness at National Portrait Gallery, owned by Tudor Place Foundation

Beverley Kennon was born in Mecklenburg County, Virginia on April 7, 1793, the son of Richard Kennon and Elizabeth Beverley (Munford) Kennon. His father was a veteran of the American Revolution and a political leader of early Virginia who served terms in both the House of Delegates and the State Senate.

Beverley Kennon was educated in Mecklenburg County, and in 1809 was appointed a midshipman in the United States Navy. He served in the War of 1812, including a posting to USS Superior on Lake Ontario. In 1813, he received his commission as a lieutenant (junior grade), and he made the Navy his career. During the Second Barbary War he served on USS Constellation (as did his brother George, the ship's surgeon), and he was involved in the capture of the Algerian ship Mashouda.

Kennon was promoted to master commandant in 1828, and in 1830 he was assigned as commander of USS Vandalia. He was promoted to captain in 1837; he commanded USS Macedonian from 1838 to 1841, and the Washington Navy Yard from 1841 to 1843. In March 1843, Kennon was assigned as head of the Navy's Bureau of Construction and Repair, and he served in this position until his death. As a senior Navy captain, Kennon was permitted to use the title commodore, which is how he was frequently addressed.

== 1844 Peacemaker accident ==
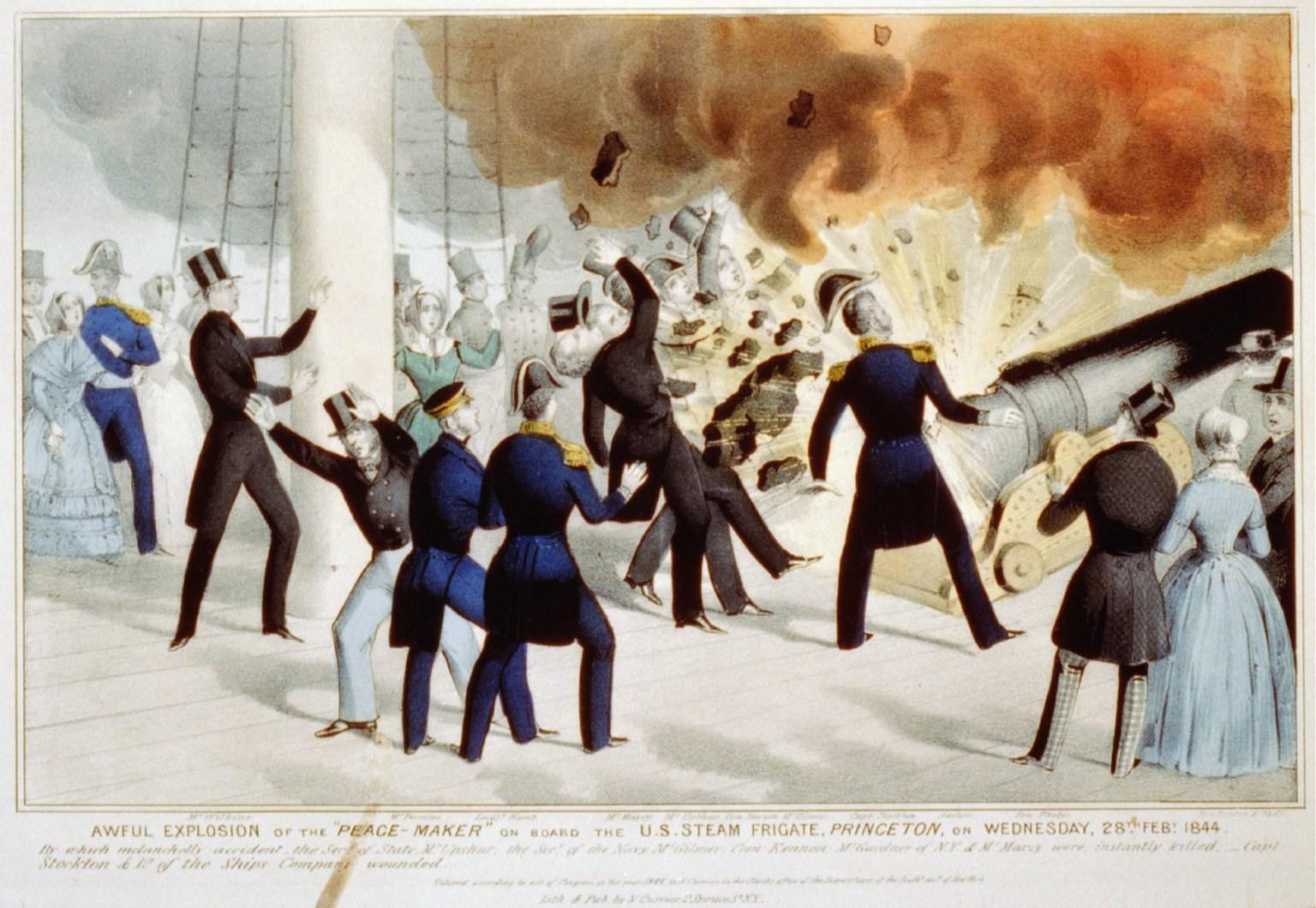
Contemporary Currier & Ives lithograph depicting the explosion

Kennon died aboard ship near Fort Washington, Maryland on February 28, 1844. On that date, USS Princeton departed Alexandria, Virginia on a demonstration cruise down the Potomac River. In attendance were President John Tyler, members of his Cabinet, former First Lady Dolley Madison, Senator Thomas Hart Benton of Missouri, and approximately four hundred guests.

As part of the demonstration, Captain Robert F. Stockton decided to fire the larger of the ship's two new long guns, Peacemaker. The gun was fired three times on the trip downriver and was loaded to fire a salute to George Washington as the ship passed Mount Vernon on the return trip. The guests aboard ship observed the first set of firings and then retired below decks for lunch and refreshments.

Afterwards, Thomas Walker Gilmer, the Secretary of the Navy and a lifelong friend of Kennon's, urged the guests to view the final shot of the Peacemaker. When Captain Stockton pulled the firing lanyard, the gun burst. Its left side had failed, spraying hot metal across the deck and shrapnel into the crowd. Instantly killed were: Kennon; Gilmer; the Secretary of State, Abel P. Upshur; Maryland attorney and politician Virgil Maxcy; David Gardiner, a New York lawyer and politician; and the President's valet, a black slave named Armistead. Another sixteen to twenty people were injured, including several members of the ship's crew, Senator Benton, and Captain Stockton. The President was below decks and not injured.

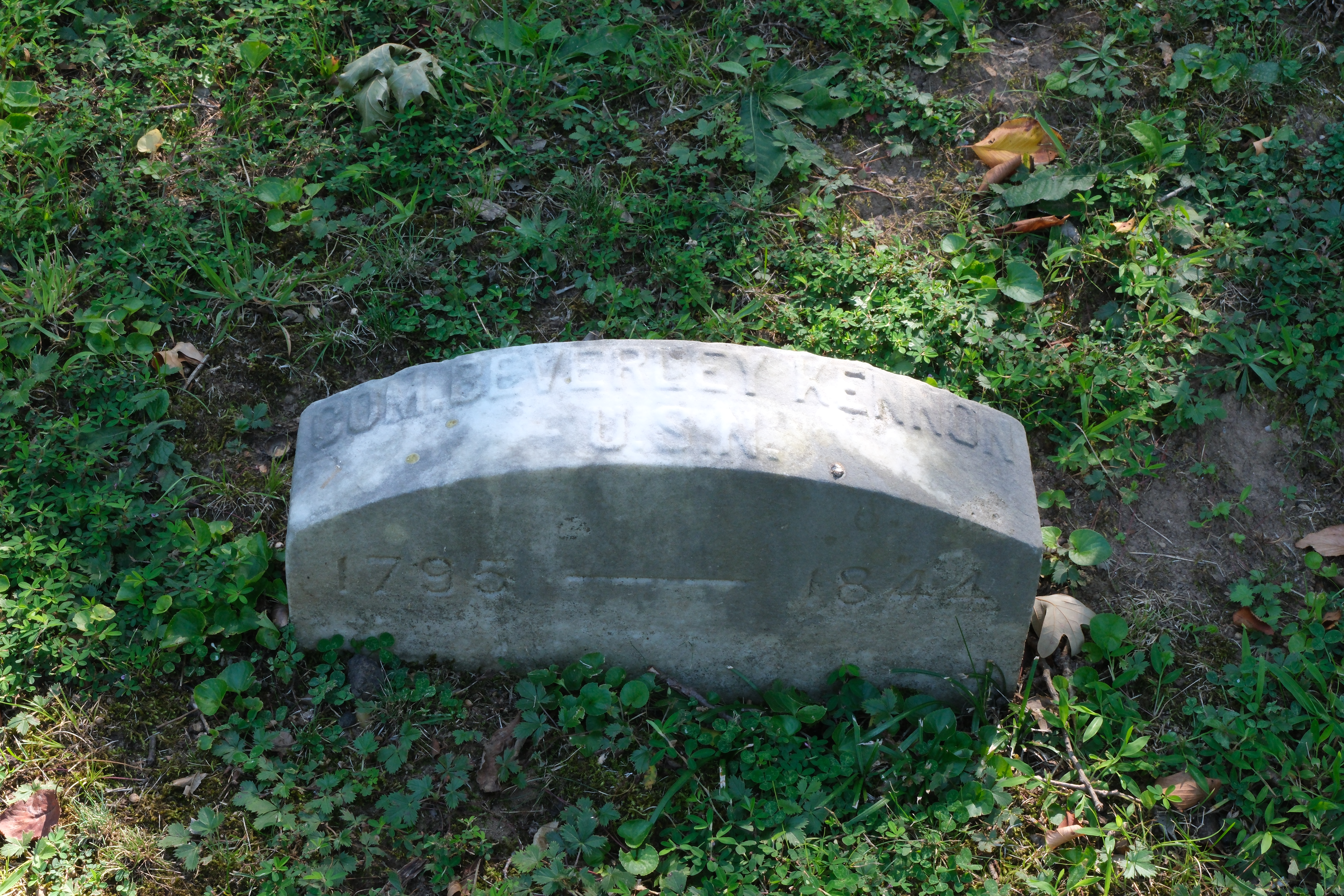
Grave of Kennon at Oak Hill Cemetery

The dead were accorded a state funeral in the East Room of the White House. Kennon was first buried at Congressional Cemetery in Washington, D.C., and later re–interred In Lot 544 of Oak Hill Cemetery in Washington.

== Family ==
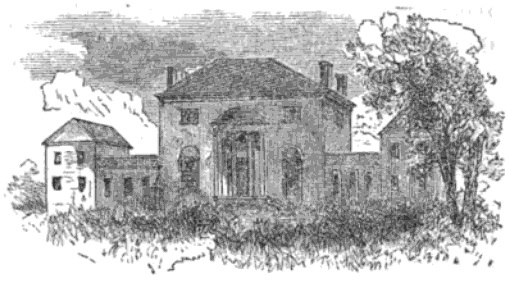
Tudor Place, 1874

Kennon's first wife was Elizabeth Dandridge of Virginia (1808–1832); in 1842, he married Dandridge's distant relative, Britannia Peter (1815–1911) of Tudor Place in Georgetown; she was the daughter of Martha Parke Custis Peter and Thomas Peter, and great-granddaughter of Martha Washington, and step-great-granddaughter of George Washington.

With his first wife, Kennon's children were sons Beverley Kennon Jr. (1830–1890) and William Dandridge Kennon (1832–1872). Beverley Kennon Jr. served as an officer in the Confederate States Navy during the American Civil War, and later became a mercenary in Egypt. William Kennon was a Confederate soldier in the Civil War, and served in the 4th Virginia Cavalry and Woolfolk's Battery of Alexander's Artillery Battalion. In addition, William D. Kennon served aboard the ship Campbell as a member of the United States Revenue Cutter Service.

With his second wife, Beverley Kennon was the father of a daughter, Martha Custis Kennon Peter (1843–1886).

== Sources ==
=== Books ===
- Browning, Charles Henry (1883). Americans of Royal Descent. Philadelphia, PA: Porter & Coates.
- Holland, Jesse J. (2016). The Invisibles: The Untold Story of African American Slaves in the White House. Guilford, Connecticut: Lyons Press.
- Merry, Robert W. (2009). A Country of Vast Designs: James K. Polk, the Mexican War, and the Conquest of the American Continent (1st ed.). New York: Simon & Schuster. ISBN 978-0743297431.
- Nester, William (2013). The Age of Jackson and the Art of American Power, 1815-1848. Dulles, VA: Potomac Books. ISBN 978-1-61234-605-2.
- United States Congress (1844). Accident on Steam-ship "Princeton"...: Report [of] the Committee on Naval Affairs.
- Stiles, Kenneth L. (1985). 4th Virginia Cavalry. Lynchburg, VA: H. E. Howard. ISBN 9780930919177.
- United States Senate (1949). Congressional Record: Proceedings and Debates of the 81st Congress. Vol. 95, Part 16. Washington, D.C.: US Government Printing Office.
- White, James T. (1897). The National Cyclopaedia of American Biography. Vol. IV. New York, NY: James T. White & Company.

=== Internet ===
- Blackman, Ann (September 2005). "Fatal Cruise of the Princeton". Naval History. Reprinted by Military.com.
- Jones family. Jones Family Papers, 1808-1942. Dublin, OH: Online Computer Library Center (OCLC). OCLC 31632523.
- "Oak Hill Cemetery, Georgetown, D.C. (Chapel Hill)" (PDF). Oak Hill Cemetery DC.org. Washington, D.C.: Oak Hill Cemetery. October 20, 2020. p. 1.
- Tudor Place. "Tudor Place Archive". www.tudorplace.org/. Washington, D.C.: Tudor Place Historic House & Garden.

=== Magazines ===
- Taylor, John M. (1984). "The Princeton Disaster". Proceedings. 110 (9). United States Naval Institute.

=== Newspapers ===
- "Further Particulars of the Accident on Board the Princeton". The Baltimore Sun. Baltimore, MD. March 1, 1844. p. 1 – via Newspapers.com.
- "Funeral Obsequies". The Baltimore Sun. Baltimore, MD. March 4, 1844. p. 1 – via Newspapers.com.
