= Vaucluse (Bridgetown, Virginia) =

Historic house in Virginia, United States

- U.S. National Register of Historic Places
- Virginia Landmarks Register
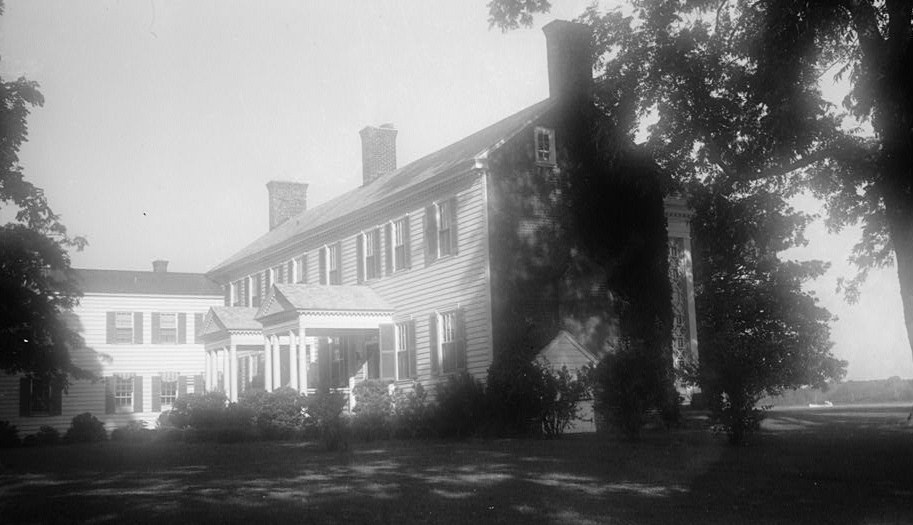
- Vaucluse, HABS Photo

- Location within Virginia Location within the United States
- Location: South of the junction of Rtes. 619 and 657, near Bridgetown, Virginia
- Coordinates: 37°25′05″N 75°58′23″W
- Area: 1,000.8 acres (405.0 ha)
- Built: 1784, 1829, 1899
- Built by: Upshur, Littleton
- NRHP reference No.: 70000814
- VLR No.: 065-0028

Significant dates
- Added to NRHP: September 15, 1970
- Designated VLR: December 2, 1969

Vaucluse is a historic plantation house located near Bridgetown, Northampton County, Virginia. Vaucluse was placed on the Virginia Landmarks Register in 1969 and the National Register of Historic Places in 1970.

== History ==
Diarist William Byrd wrote of an early owner, attorney Andrew Hamilton, that he has "bad character and he got the estate nobody knows how". In 1812 it was acquired by Richmond attorney and delegate and later Navy Secretary and Secretary of State Abel P. Upshur (1790–1844) who died in the USS Princeton disaster of 1844. His brother U.S. Navy Commander George P. Upshur (1799–1852), owned nearby Caserta from 1836 to 1847.

Descendants of Littleton Upshur and Arthur Upshur IV reacquired it in 1984.

== Architecture ==
The complex, two-story, ell-shaped brick and frame structure features a gable roof. Attached to the house is a 1 1/2-story quarter kitchen with brick ends. The house's brickended section was built about 1784, and an addition added in 1829. During restoration and removal of a baseboard, a note names the painter as Angelo A. Townsend.The annex connecting the house with the old kitchen was probably added in 1889.
