= Caserta (disambiguation) =

Caserta is the capital of the province of Caserta in the Campania region of Italy.

Caserta may also refer to:

== Places ==
=== United States ===
- Caserta (Eastville, Virginia), a historic plantation house

=== Italy ===
- Province of Caserta, Campania, Italy
  - Portico di Caserta, a comune (municipality) in the Province of Caserta
    - Palace of Caserta, a former royal residence in Caserta
    - Caserta railway station
- Roman Catholic Diocese of Caserta

== People ==
- Prince Alfonso, Count of Caserta (1841–1934), Pretender to the throne of the Two Sicilies
- Antonello da Caserta (active late 14th and early 15th centuries), Italian composer
- Fabio Caserta (born 1978), Italian footballer
- Peggy Caserta (1940–2024), American businesswoman and memoirist
- Philippus de Caserta (late 14th century), Italian music theorist
- Raffaelo Caserta (born 1972), Italian fencer who competed at the 1996 Summer Olympics
- Robert of Caserta (died 1183), Count of Caserta

== Other uses ==
- SS Caserta, an Italian ocean liner
- Surrender of Caserta, the 1945 formal surrender document of the German forces in Italy, signed at the Palace of Caserta
