= Jonathan Maxcy =

American academic administrator

The Reverend Jonathan Maxcy
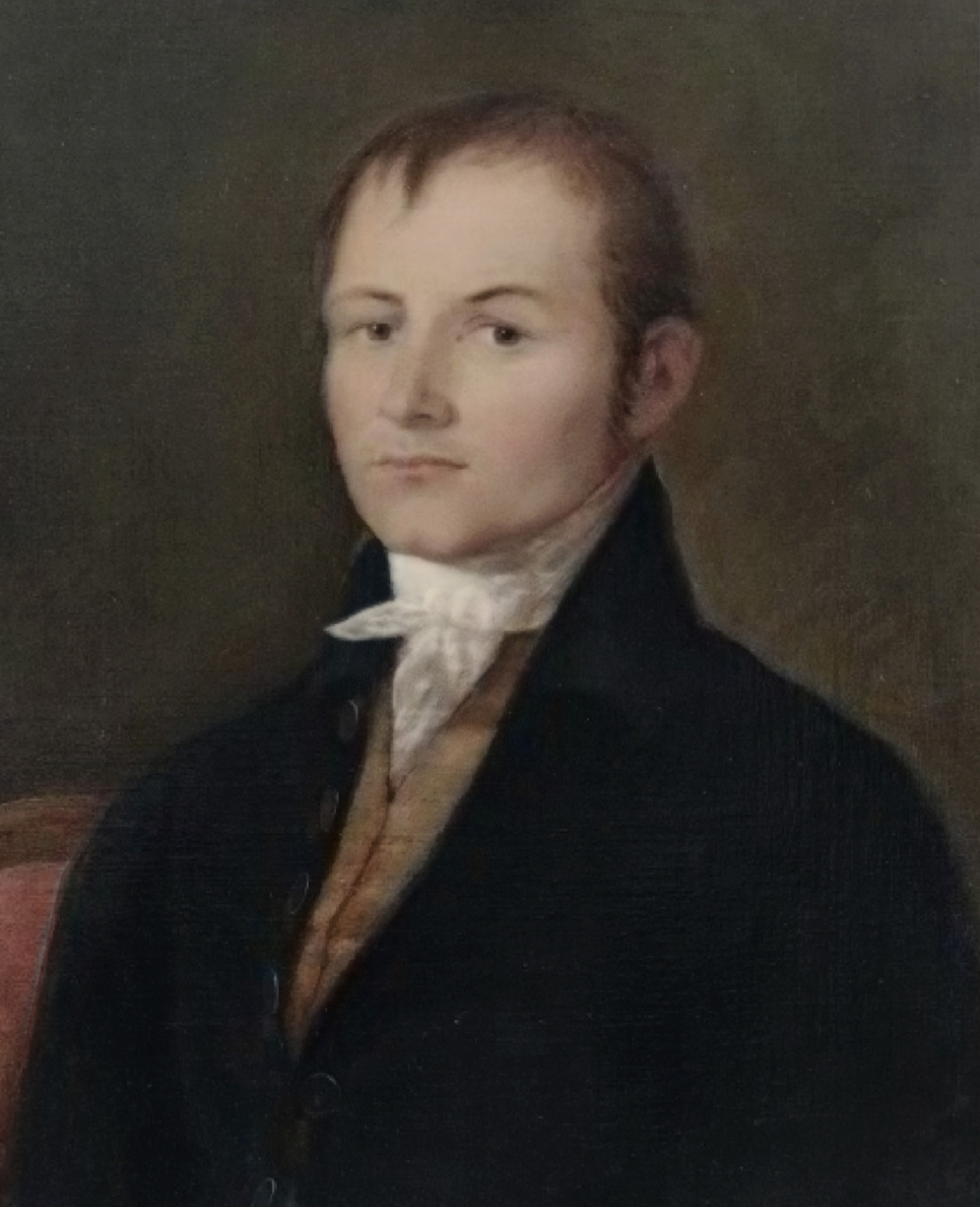

2nd President of Brown University
- In office 1792–1802
- Preceded by: James Manning
- Succeeded by: Asa Messer

3rd President of Union College
- In office 1802–1804

1st President of the University of South Carolina
- In office 1804–1820
- Succeeded by: Thomas Cooper

Personal details
- Born: September 2, 1768 Attleboro, Massachusetts Bay
- Died: June 4, 1820 (aged 51) Columbia, South Carolina, U.S.
- Resting place: First Presbyterian Churchyard, Columbia
- Spouse: Susanna Hopkins
- Relations: Virgil Maxcy (brother)
- Education: The College of Rhode Island and Providence Plantations
- Profession: Minister; University president

Jonathan Maxcy (September 2, 1768 – June 4, 1820) was an American Baptist minister and college president. He was the second president of Brown University (then known as the College in the English Colony of Rhode Island & Providence Plantations), of which he was also a graduate; the third president of Union College; and the founding president of the University of South Carolina (then known as the South Carolina College).

== Early life ==
Maxcy was born 2 Sep 1768, in the town of Attleboro, Massachusetts Bay, British American Colonies. His younger brother was Virgil Maxcy, a Maryland political figure who was killed in the explosion of the USS Princeton. He was educated at an academy in Wrentham, Massachusetts, and then attended Brown University, from which he graduated in 1787. In 1789, he was baptized by James Manning, the first president of Brown.

== Baptist ministry ==
In 1790, Maxcy was licensed to preach by First Baptist Church in Providence and the next year, following Manning's death, he became pastor of First Baptist Church. In 1796, he authored the well known Discourse Designed to Explain the Doctrine of Atonement which became a widely consulted work on Edwardsean theological views that found expression in the Second Great Awakening. The first president of the Southern Baptist Convention William Bullein Johnson was one of Maxcy's theological protégés.

== Race and Slavery ==
While unclear whether Macxy himself owned slaves or took a position on slavery, the Maxcys were said to have been sympathetic towards slavery as Jonathan Maxcy's father Levi owned at least one slave. Maxcy also held close relationships with a number of prominent southern slave owners, including Furman, leading many to believe he defended the great american evil.

== Brown University presidency ==
In 1789, Maxcy was elected a trustee of and appointed professor of divinity at Brown. In 1792, at only 24 years of age, he was elected president pro tempore of the College of Rhode Island & Providence Plantations, now Brown University, and therefore resigned as pastor of First Baptist Church. He was formally elected president of the college in 1797 after which he served until 1802.

Professor Romeo Elton wrote of the Maxcy presidency at Brown:

The University over which he presided with distinguished honor to himself and benefit to the public, flourished under his administration, and his fame was extended over every section of the Union. The splendor of his genius, and his brilliant talents as an orator and a divine, were seen and admired by all. ... Under his administration the College acquired a reputation for belles-lettres and eloquence inferior to no seminary of learning in the United States. His pupils saw in him an admirable model for their imitation, and the influence of his pure and cultivated taste was seen in their literary performances. Though destitute of funds, and patronage from the legislature of the state, guided by his genius and wisdom, the College flourished and diffused its light over every part of the country. ... Dr. Maxcy was one of the most learned men which our country has produced. Criticism, metaphysics, politics, morals, and theology all occupied his attention. His stores of knowledge were immense, and he had at all times the command over them.

== Union College presidency ==
In 1801, Jonathan Edwards Jr., the second president of Union College in Schenectady, New York, died and Maxcy succeeded him as its third president.

== University of South Carolina presidency ==
Maxcy left Union College in 1804 to become the first president of the South Carolina College, now the University of South Carolina, where he remained until his death on June 4, 1820.

== Honors and memorials ==
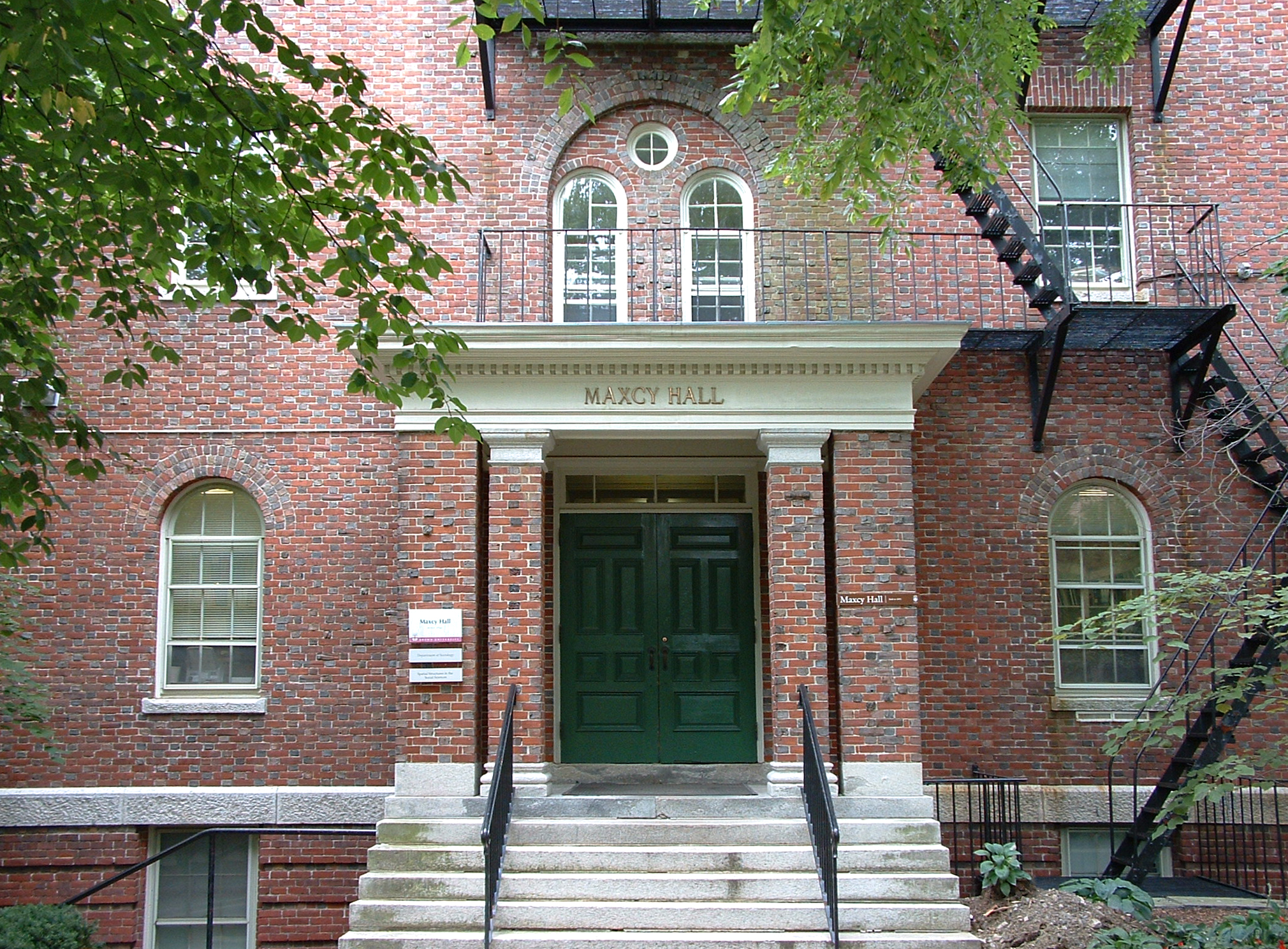
Maxcy Hall at Brown

While president of Brown, Maxcy received the honorary degree of D.D. from Harvard. At Brown, Maxcy Hall built in 1895 and still in use was named for him. A building at Union College bore the name Maxcy House from 1971 until 1990 when its name was changed to Fero House. In 1827 the Maxcy Monument designed by noted architect Robert Mills was erected in the center of the Horseshoe, the main quadrangle of the University of South Carolina. In 1937 Maxcy College was built just north of the Horseshoe facing Pendleton Street.

== Personal life ==
On 27 August 1791, Maxcy married Susanna Hopkins, daughter of Commodore Esek Hopkins and niece of former Royal Governor of Rhode Island and first Brown University chancellor Stephen Hopkins of Providence. They had at least 3 daughters and 4 sons.

== See also ==
- List of presidents of Brown University
- List of presidents of the University of South Carolina

Academic offices
| Preceded by James Manning | President of Brown University; 1792–1802 | Succeeded by Asa Messer |
