= Winona (Winona, Virginia) =

Historic house in Virginia, United States

- U.S. National Register of Historic Places
- Virginia Landmarks Register
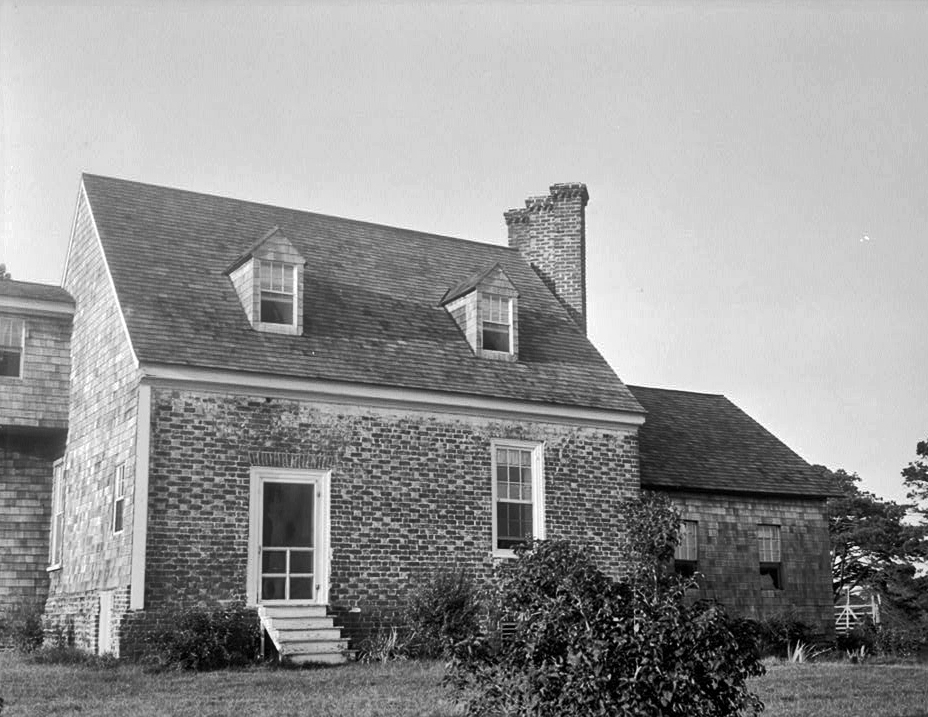
- Winona in the 1930s

- Location within Virginia Location within the United States
- Location: Northeast of the junction of Rtes. 619 and 622, near Bridgetown, Virginia
- Coordinates: 37°26′42″N 75°56′02″W
- Area: 0 acres (0 ha)
- Built: c. 1681
- Built by: Patrick, Mathew
- Architectural style: Medieval
- NRHP reference No.: 69000264
- VLR No.: 065-0032

Significant dates
- Added to NRHP: October 1, 1969
- Designated VLR: November 5, 1968

Winona is a historic home located near Bridgetown, Northampton County, Virginia. It dates to about 1681, and is a small, 1 1/2-story, brick structure with a gable roof. It measures 32 feet, 6 inches, by 27 feet 6 inches. It features an exterior end chimney with three free-standing stacks set diagonally on the base.

It was listed on the National Register of Historic Places in 1969.
