= USS Gilmer =

Two ships in the United States Navy have been named USS Gilmer after the 19th-century American statesman Thomas Walker Gilmer:

- USS Gilmer (DD-233) was a Clemson-class destroyer commissioned in 1920 and decommissioned in 1946.
- USS Gilmer (PC-565) was a patrol boat commissioned in 1942 and decommissioned in 1946.
