= Bridgetown, Virginia =

Unincorporated community in Virginia, US

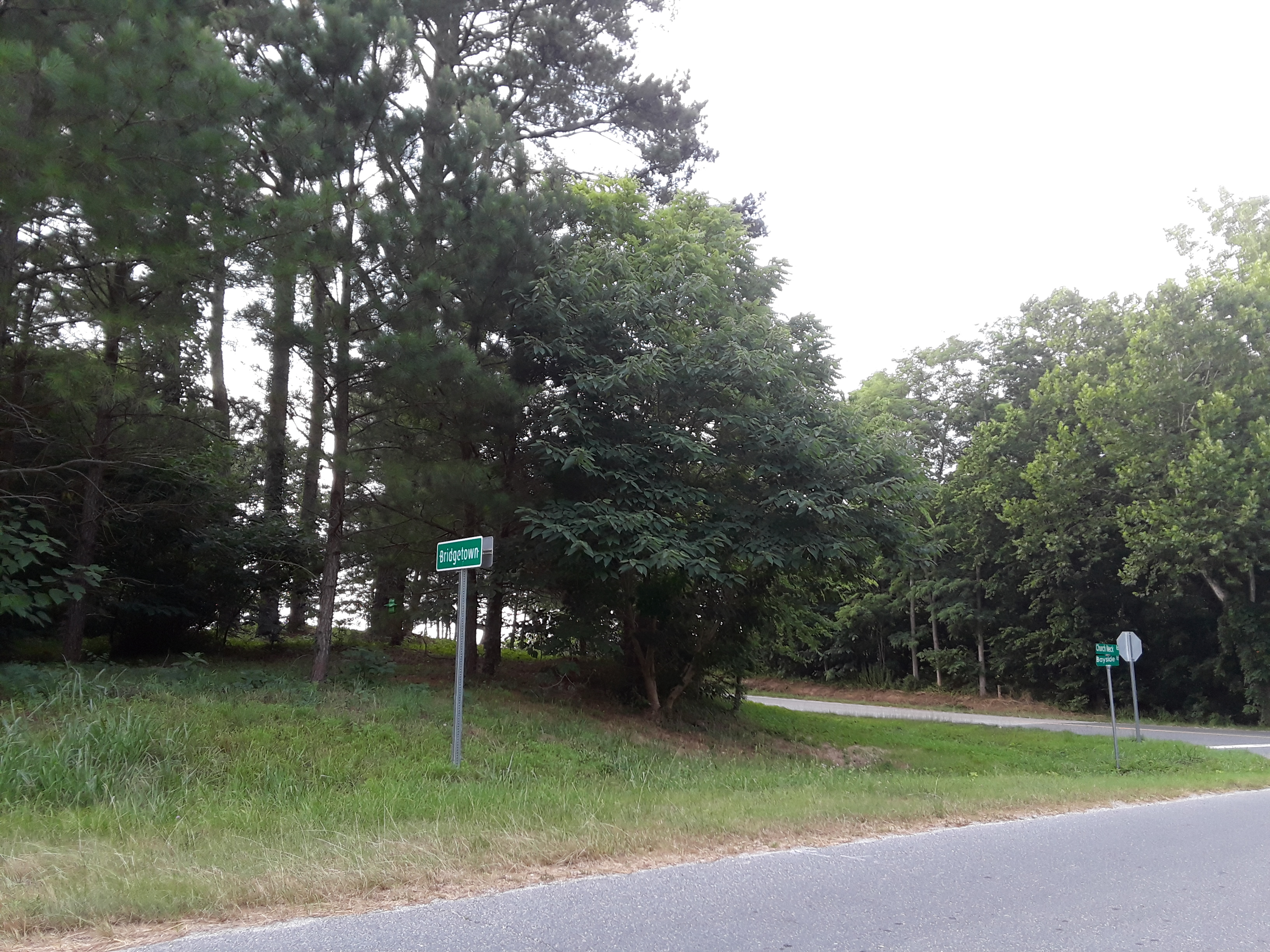
Entering Bridgetown, 2018

Bridgetown is an unincorporated community in Northampton County, Virginia, United States.

The locations Hungars Church, Vaucluse, Westerhouse House, Winona, and Chatham are listed on the National Register of Historic Places.

== Notable person ==
- Chuck Churn, longtime minor league baseball player who pitched three seasons in the majors for three different teams
