= Caserta (Eastville, Virginia) =

Historic house in Virginia, US

- Formerly listed on the U.S. National Register of Historic Places
- Virginia Landmarks Register
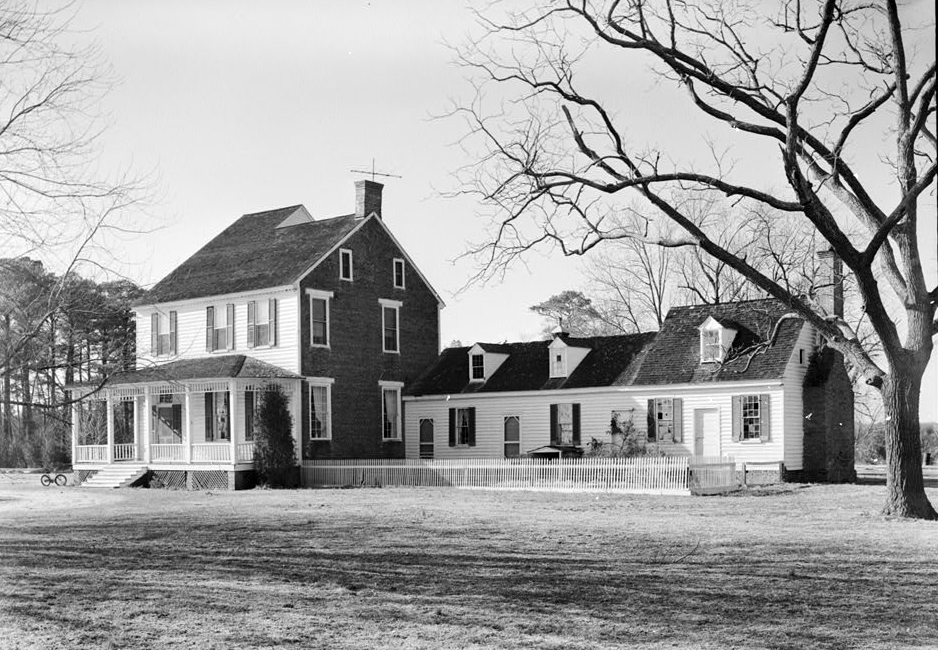
- HABS photograph of Caserta
- Location: NW of junction of Routes 630 and US 13, near Eastville, Virginia
- Area: 190 acres (77 ha)
- Architectural style: Greek Revival
- NRHP reference No.: 70000816
- VLR No.: 065-0051

Significant dates
- Added to NRHP: February 26, 1970
- Designated VLR: December 2, 1969
- Removed from NRHP: March 19, 2001
- Delisted VLR: March 19, 1997

Caserta was a historic plantation house located near Eastville, Northampton County, Virginia. The oldest section was dated to about 1736. The house consisted of a two-story, three-bay main block with a gable roof and a brick end with an interior end chimney. It had a 1 1/2-story end wing and hyphen, the end wing having a large exterior end chimney and a steeper gable roof than the hyphen. The main section was built by U.S. Navy Commander George P. Upshur (1799-1852), brother of Judge Abel Parker Upshur of Vaucluse. He owned the property from 1836 to 1847. It was destroyed by fire in 1975.

It was listed on the National Register of Historic Places in 1970 and delisted in 2001.
