= Romeo Elton =

American academic and author

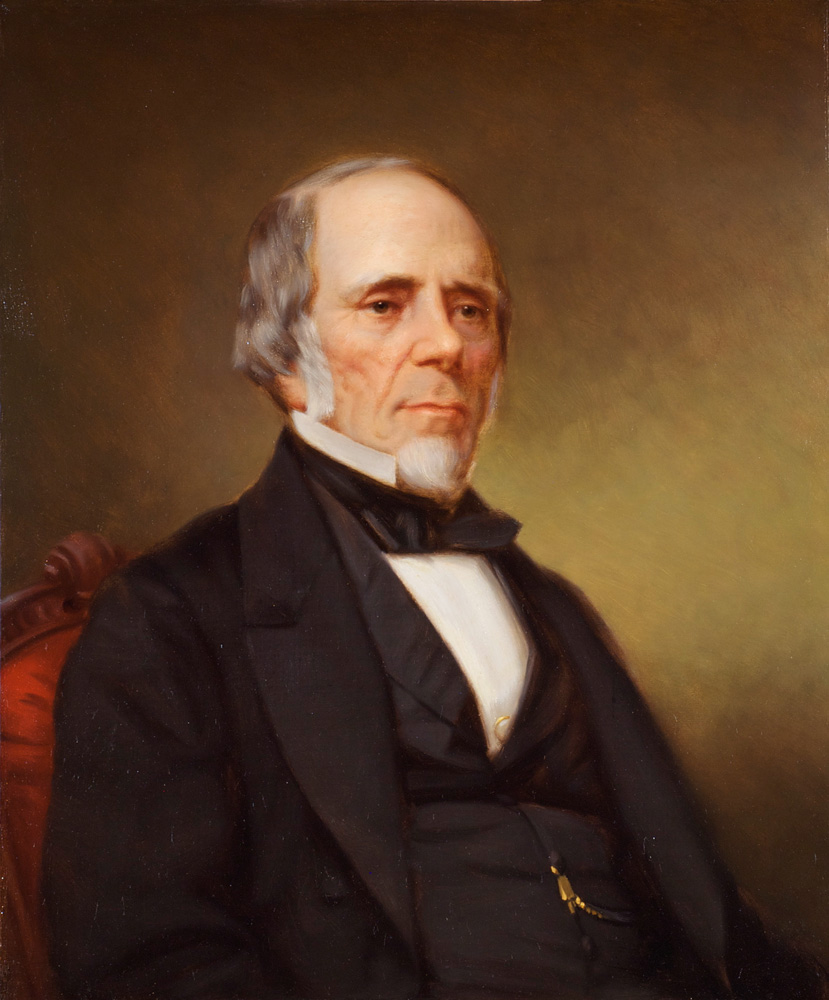
- 1863 portrait by James Sullivan Lincoln
- Born: 1790; Bristol, Connecticut
- Died: 1870 (aged 79-80)
- Occupation: Academic · minister

Academic background
- Education: Brown University

Academic work
- Discipline: Latin & Greek

Romeo Elton (1817–1889) was an American academic, minister, and author. A trained Baptist minister, he taught at Brown University as a professor of Latin and Greek Languages from 1825 to 1845.

== Biography ==
=== Early life ===
Romeo Elton was born on 1790 in current day Burlington, Connecticut, then a part of Bristol, Connecticut. He graduated from Brown University in 1813

Elton was ordained as a Baptist minister in 1817, assuming pastorships in Newport, Rhode Island and Vermont. In 1825, he became a professor of Latin and Greek Languages at Brown University. As a professor, he was a student favorite, noted for his awkward appearance and genial nature. He taught at Brown until 1845. He also served on the Board of Trustees of Brown University.

Elton wrote two books and co-wrote a third one. He wrote about the civic and religious affairs in colonial Rhode Island, Roger Williams, founder of the Providence Plantations, and Jonathan Maxcy (1768–1820), the second President of Brown University.

He served as the Second Vice President of the Rhode Island Historical Society in 1837.

Elton moved to England after retiring from Brown University. He returned to the United States in 1879, dying the following year.

The Romeo Elton Professorship in Natural Theology is an endowed chair at Brown University also named in his honor. The professorship has previously been held by Richard Kimberly Heck and by John Tomasi, and is currently held by Bernard Reginster.

== Bibliography ==
- An Historical Discourse on the Civil and Religious Affairs of the Colony of Rhode-Island (with John Callender, Washington, D.C.: Library of Congress, 1838).
- Life of Roger Williams: The Earliest Legislator and True Champion for a Full and Absolute Liberty of Conscience (Washington, D.C.: Library of Congress, 1842).
- The Literary Remains of the Rev. J. Maxcy: With a Memoir of His Life (1844).
