= USS Levant =

Second-class US Navy sloop-of-war

History

United States
- Name: USS Levant
- Builder: New York Navy Yard
- Launched: 28 December 1837
- Commissioned: 17 March 1838
- Fate: Lost at sea, 1860

General characteristics
- Type: Sloop-of-war
- Displacement: 792 long tons (805 t)
- Length: 132 ft 3 in (40.31 m)
- Beam: 34 ft 3 in (10.44 m)
- Draft: 15 ft 9 in (4.80 m)
- Propulsion: Sails
- Complement: 200 officers and enlisted
- Armament: 4 × 24-pounder guns; 13 × 32-pounder carronades

The first USS Levant was a second-class sloop-of-war in the United States Navy.

Levant was launched on 28 December 1837 by New York Navy Yard; and commissioned on 17 March 1838, with Commander Hiram Paulding in command.

== Service history ==
=== West Indies and Pacific, 1838–1845 ===
Levant sailed from New York on 1 April 1838 for four years' service in the West Indies Squadron protecting American interests in the Caribbean and South Atlantic. Returning to Norfolk, Virginia, the sloop-of-war decommissioned 26 June 1842.

She recommissioned 27 March 1843, Comdr. Hugh N. Page in command, and departed Norfolk to join the Pacific Squadron under Commodore John D. Sloat. From 1843 to 1845 Levant cruised between Panama and Latin American ports carrying diplomats and dispatches and generally furthering American national policy.

=== Mexican–American War, 1846–47 ===
With the Mexican–American War impending, Levant was ordered to the California coast to protect American citizens and property, and was en route when Mexico declared war on 12 May 1846. The sloop arrived off Monterey, California, on 1 July, and six days later a landing force from Levant, Savannah, and Cyane took possession of the recently proclaimed Republic of California.

On 23 July, Commodore Sloat relinquished command of the Pacific Squadron because of illness, and sailed 29 July in Levant for the east coast. Upon arriving at Norfolk on 28 April 1847, the sloop was placed in ordinary.

=== Mediterranean, 1852–1855 ===
Levant was recommissioned on 12 July 1852, Comdr. George P. Upshur in command, and sailed for the Mediterranean. When Commander Upshur died on board Levant off Spezia, Italy on 3 November, Comdr. Louis M. Goldsborough, later to win fame in the American Civil War, took command. On 7 April 1853 at Leghorn, Italy, Levant loaded statues by American sculptor Horatio Greenough, including one of George Washington, destined for the Capitol at Washington, D.C. After embarking the U.S. Minister to Turkey and his family at Piraeus, Greece on 24 June, Levant sailed to Constantinople, arriving on 5 July. Returning to Hampton Roads, Virginia, on 29 April 1855, Levant decommissioned at New York Navy Yard on 4 May.

=== East India Squadron, 1855–58 ===
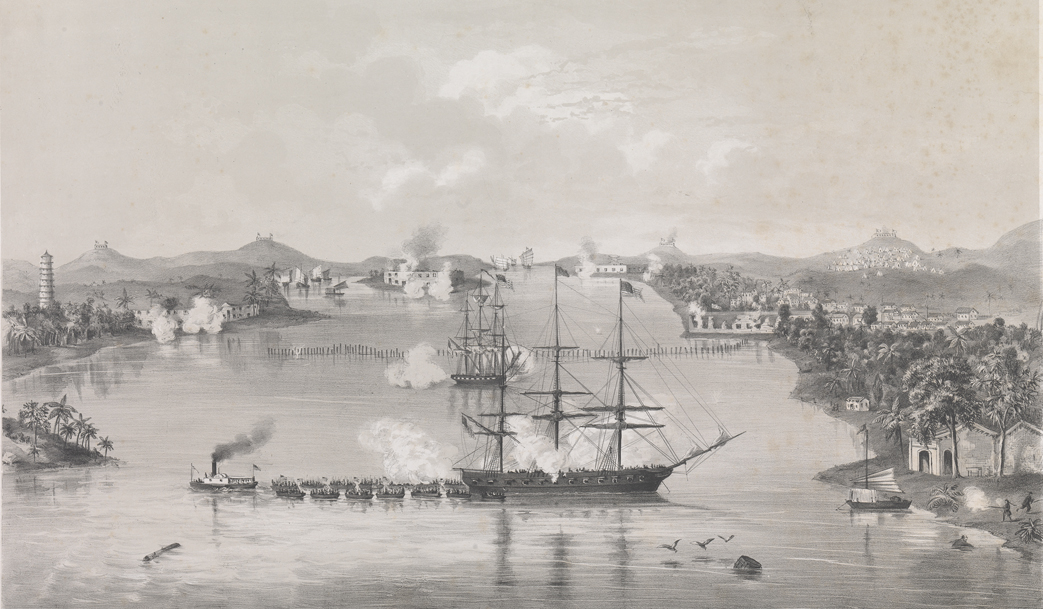
Attack on the Barrier Forts on 21 November, showing Portsmouth, and Levant, with men and officers from the steam frigate San Jacinto

Recommissioned on 31 October, Comdr. William N. Smith in command, Levant sailed on 13 November for Rio de Janeiro, the Cape of Good Hope, and Hong Kong, where she arrived to join the East India Squadron on 12 May 1856. On 1 July she embarked the U.S. Commissioner to China for transportation to Shanghai, arriving 1 August. At the outbreak of hostilities between the British and the Chinese, Levant arrived Whampoa on 28 October. Comdr. Andrew H. Foote then sent a landing party from Levant and his own ship, Portsmouth, to Canton to protect American lives and property there. On 15 November, while in the process of withdrawing this force, Commander Foote was fired on while passing in a small boat by the "Barrier Forts" on the Pearl River below Canton. On the 16th Levant was towed upriver to join Portsmouth and San Jacinto in keeping the Pearl open to American shipping. As the forts were being strengthened in disregard of American neutrality, Foote was ordered by Commodore James Armstrong, commanding the squadron, "to take such measures as his judgment would dictate... even the capture of the forts."

Commander Foote complied with all the dash and courage for which he became famous during the Civil War. On 20 November he took the first fort by leading an amphibious assault with 300 men, then silenced the second with cannon captured from the first. Next day he took the third, and by the 24th all four were in American hands and the Pearl once again safe for American shipping.

Levant, close in through most of the action, received the major part of the Chinese bombardment, with 22 shot holes in her hull and rigging, one man dead, and six injured. Destruction of the earthworks was completed by 5 December, and Levant cruised between Hong Kong and Shanghai until she departed Hong Kong on 7 December 1857 for home, arriving at the Boston Navy Yard 6 April 1858.

=== Pacific Squadron, 1859–60 ===
After repairs into 1859, Levant, Comdr. William E. Hunt in command, sailed on 15 June for the Pacific, arriving at Valparaíso, Chile on 11 October, to serve as Pacific Squadron flagship, wearing Commodore John B. Montgomery's broad pennant, through December. In January 1860 Levant sailed for the coast of Nicaragua, where she relieved Saranac and began five months of showing the flag off the coasts of Central and South America.

In May 1860, Levant was ordered to the Hawaiian Islands at the request of the Secretary of State to investigate the disbursement of relief funds to American merchant seamen. After receiving a state visit by King Kamehameha IV at Honolulu on 7 May, and investigating at Lahaina, Maui, and Hilo, Hawaii, Levant sailed for Panama on 18 September 1860, but never made port.

=== Disappearance ===
Commodore Montgomery reported that a violent hurricane had occurred in September 1860 in a part of the Pacific Ocean which Levant was to cross. In June 1861, a mast and a part of a lower yardarm believed to be from Levant were found near Hilo. Spikes had been driven into the mast as if to form a raft. Rumors also circulated that she had run aground on an uncharted reef off California.

In July 1861, a small bottle was found at Cape Sable Island, Nova Scotia. It was corked and contained a card that read in part: "Pacific Ocean" "Levant" "Written by the last remaining" "three" "in a boat" "God forgive us". Unfortunately, the card was damaged when it was removed from the bottle and parts of the message were unreadable. This card was in the possession of Thomas Willett of Pubnico, Nova Scotia, in 1862, who lost a son aboard this vessel.(How? Further information is needed).

On 24 July 1861, the United States Congress passed a law to compensate the widows and orphan children of the officers, seamen, marines and others who were lost with the Levant. The law made a provision for accounts paid and received by the ship's purser, Andrew J. Watson, which were to be settled. The law was included in the "Private Acts" section of the statutes book. The deaths of the officers of Levant were recorded in the Navy Register of 1863 as occurring on 30 June 1861. (This was probably to allow the survivors of the lost men to collect 6 months of their pay as compensation.)

=== Literary reemergence ===
In 1863, when Edward Everett Hale wrote the patriotic short story The Man Without a Country, the announcement of the death of the exiled Philip Nolan while at sea is said to have been while he was aboard the USS Levant on 11 May 1863. In reality, the ship was last heard from in September 1860.
