= Virgil Maxcy =

American politician (1785–1844)

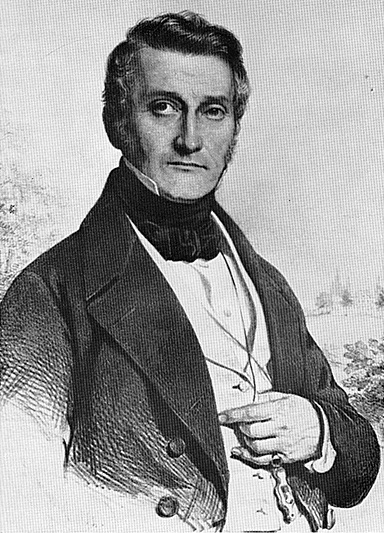
- Lithograph of Virgil Maxcy, with Tulip Hill Estate in background

2nd United States Chargé d'Affaires to Belgium
- In office October 24, 1837 – September 17, 1842
- President: Martin Van Buren
- Preceded by: Hugh S. Legaré
- Succeeded by: Henry Washington Hilliard

1st Solicitor of the United States Treasury
- In office May 29, 1830 – June 15, 1837
- President: Andrew Jackson
- Preceded by: None
- Succeeded by: Henry D. Gilpin

Maryland House of Delegates
- In office 1824–1825

Maryland Senate
- In office 1817–1821

Maryland Executive Council
- In office December 1815 – December, 1816 Serving with Alexander Contee Magruder; James Shaw; John Murray; William H. Ward
- Preceded by: Alexander Contee Magruder; William H. Ward; Thomas G. Addison; Samuel Ridout; John Murray
- Succeeded by: William Potter; Henry Henley Chapman; Richard Frisby; James Shaw; William H. Ward

Personal details
- Born: May 5, 1785 Attleboro, Massachusetts, U.S.
- Died: February 28, 1844 (aged 58) (at sea near) Fort Washington, Maryland, U.S.
- Spouse: Mary Galloway Maxcy
- Education: Brown University
- Profession: Attorney; Plantation owner

Virgil Maxcy (May 5, 1785 – February 28, 1844) was an American political figure. He was born in Attleboro, Massachusetts, and spent his adult years in Maryland. He was killed in 1844 in a shipboard accident, when a cannon exploded aboard USS Princeton.

== Early life ==
The younger brother of Jonathan Maxcy, Virgil Maxcy was born in Attleboro, Massachusetts, on May 5, 1785. He graduated from Brown University in 1804, studied law with Robert Goodloe Harper, was admitted to the bar in 1807, and became an attorney in Baltimore, Maryland.

== Author ==
In 1811 Maxcy authored The Laws of Maryland from 1692 to 1809, a multi-volume work that compiled Maryland's statutes, declaration of independence, constitution and amendments.

Maxcy also prepared and distributed The Maryland resolutions, and the objections to them considered (1822), which argued against proposals to appropriate public land for the building of schools and other purposes.

In 1833 he delivered A discourse before the Phi Beta Kappa Society of Brown University, a lecture that was published as a pamphlet.

== Political career ==
Originally a Federalist, Maxcy served on Maryland's Executive Council in 1815 and served terms in the Maryland Senate (1817–1821) and the Maryland House of Delegates (1824–1825).

Maxcy later became a Democrat and supported Andrew Jackson for President in 1824 and 1828. When Jackson won the 1828 election, Maxcy's friend John C. Calhoun attempted to have him appointed as Treasurer of the United States, but Jackson and Secretary of the Treasury Samuel D. Ingham decided for political reasons to offer the position to John Campbell. Instead, Maxcy received appointment as Solicitor of the Treasury, where he served from 1830 to 1837.

Maxcy was active in the American Colonization Society (ACS), and in 1837 was one of the incorporators who successfully petitioned to change the organization's name; it had previously been known as the Society for the Colonization of Free People of Color of America.

Also in 1837, President Martin Van Buren named William Haywood as US Chargé d'Affaires in Belgium. Haywood declined the appointment, and Van Buren then named Maxcy, who served until 1842.

In February 1844, Maxcy was considered for the position of Secretary of the Navy, but President Tyler appointed Thomas Walker Gilmer instead. Gilmer was killed in the same accident that killed Maxcy.

== Death and burial ==
Maxcy died near Fort Washington, Maryland, on February 28, 1844, as a result of the explosion on board USS Princeton, which also killed five others, including two members of President John Tyler's cabinet. Maxcy was struck by metal shards from the "Peacemaker" cannon, a large artillery piece made by the Hogg & Delamater Ironworks which was being fired as part of a demonstration for visiting dignitaries. According to published accounts, Maxcy lost both arms and a leg in the explosion and was killed instantly.

Maxcy was originally entombed at Congressional Cemetery in Washington, D.C. He was later reinterred at Tulip Hill, a large estate near Annapolis, Maryland, that was owned by his wife's family.

== Personal life ==
Virgil Maxcy was married to Mary Galloway, a member of one of Maryland's most prominent plantation owning families. He was thus a wealthy man, with most of his fortune consisting of slaves and land.

The children of Virgil and Mary Galloway Maxcy included Ann (1813–1891), Mary (1812–1878), Cornelia (1815–1823), and Juliana (1816–1818).

Ann Maxcy was the wife of George Wurtz Hughes, who served as a United States representative from Maryland.

Mary Maxcy married Francis Markoe (1801–1872) in 1834. Their children included Francis Markoe (1840–1914), who married Maria Perry Thomas of Talbot County, Maryland and Emilie Maxcy Markoe (1852–1925), who married D. C. F. Rivinus.

Maxcy was a longtime friend of John C. Calhoun. They exchanged frequent letters, many of which have been published.

== Legacy ==
Coat of Arms of Virgil Maxcy

He was the subject of a biography, 1981's A Federalist Converted: The Life of Virgil Maxcy of Maryland, 1785-1844, by Michael Cullen Reis.

Maxcy is a prominent figure in academic discussions about same-sex intimate relationships in the United States during the early 1800s, which results from a letter he sent to a friend. In the letter to William Blanding of Rehoboth, Massachusetts, Maxcy reminisces about sharing a bed with Blanding, including the line "Sometimes I think I have got hold of your doodle when in reality I have hold of the bedpost."
