= Henry D. Gilpin =

United States Attorney General (1840–1841)

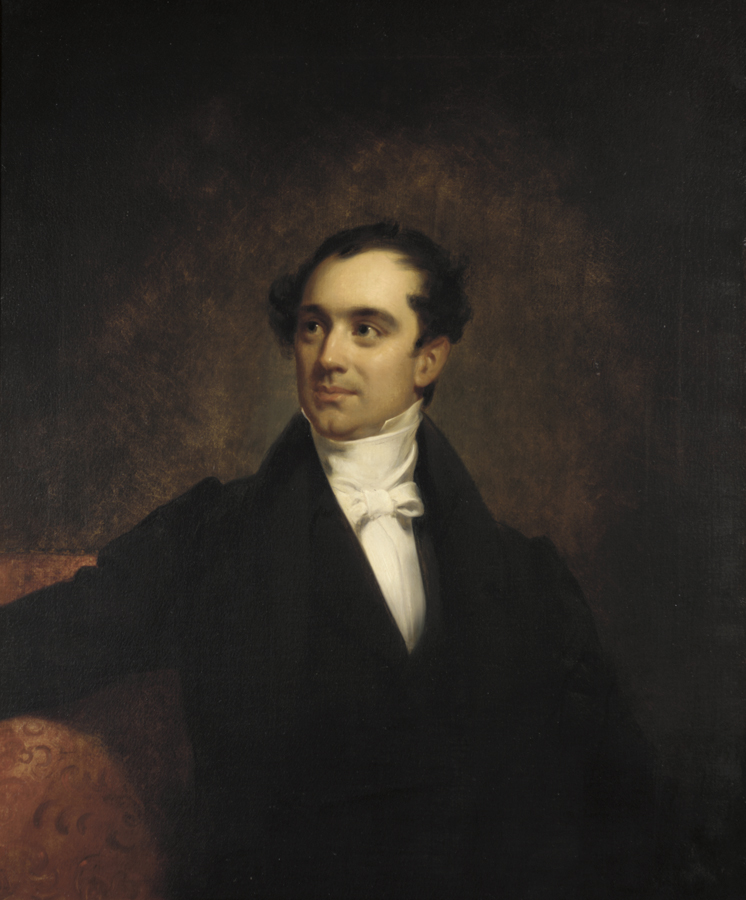
- Portrait by Henry Inman, c. 1834

14th United States Attorney General
- In office January 11, 1840 – March 4, 1841
- President: Martin Van Buren
- Preceded by: Felix Grundy
- Succeeded by: John J. Crittenden

2nd Solicitor of the United States Treasury
- In office June 16, 1837 – January 11, 1840
- Preceded by: Virgil Maxcy
- Succeeded by: Matthew Birchard

U.S. Attorney for the Eastern District of Pennsylvania
- In office 1831–1837

Personal details
- Born: Henry Dilworth Gilpin; April 14, 1801 Lancaster, Lancashire, UK
- Died: January 29, 1860 (aged 58) Philadelphia, Pennsylvania, U.S.
- Resting place: Laurel Hill Cemetery, Philadelphia, Pennsylvania, U.S.
- Party: Democratic
- Education: University of Pennsylvania (BA)

Henry Dilworth Gilpin (April 14, 1801 – January 29, 1860) was an American lawyer and statesman who served as the 14th Attorney General of the United States under President Martin Van Buren from 1840 to 1841. He served as the 2nd Solicitor of the United States Treasury from 1837 to 1840 and U.S. Attorney for the United States District Court for the Eastern District of Pennsylvania from 1831 to 1837.

== Early life and education ==
Gilpin was the son of Philadelphia-born industrialist Joshua Gilpin and Mary Dilworth, and was born in Lancaster, England, just before his parents returned to America. His father had been on extended tour of Britain and Europe, lasting from 1795 to 1801, during which he obtained information about the new manufacturing methods used in paper-making for his family paper mills on Brandywine Creek in Delaware.

The family returned to England for another stay in 1812 and Gilpin attended school near London. He returned to the United States in about 1816. He graduated from the University of Pennsylvania in 1819. He studied law with Joseph R. Ingersoll and was admitted to the bar in 1822.

== Career ==
He served as U.S. Attorney for the Eastern District of Pennsylvania from 1831 to 1837, and then as Solicitor of the United States Treasury in 1837. During this time he joined the American Philosophical Society (elected in 1832)

From 1833 to 1835 he was on the board of the Bank of the United States. Gilpin supported President Andrew Jackson's belief that the bank had become too powerful and worked to ensure that the banks charter was denied which caused the bank to close in 1836. Jackson nominated Gilpin to be the territorial governor of Michigan in 1835 but the confirmation was blocked by Jackson's enemies in Congress.

President Martin Van Buren named him 14th Attorney General of the United States in 1840. He served until 1841, during which time he presented the U.S. government's side of the Amistad case to the U.S. Supreme Court.

From 7 June 1852 until 13 June 1859 he served as president of the Pennsylvania Academy of Fine Arts. He served as vice president and trustee of the Pennsylvania Historical Society and as an associate member of the Massachusetts Historical Society. He served as a director of Girard College from 1856 to 1858 and as a trustee of the University of Pennsylvania. He worked as secretary of the Chesapeake and Delaware Canal.

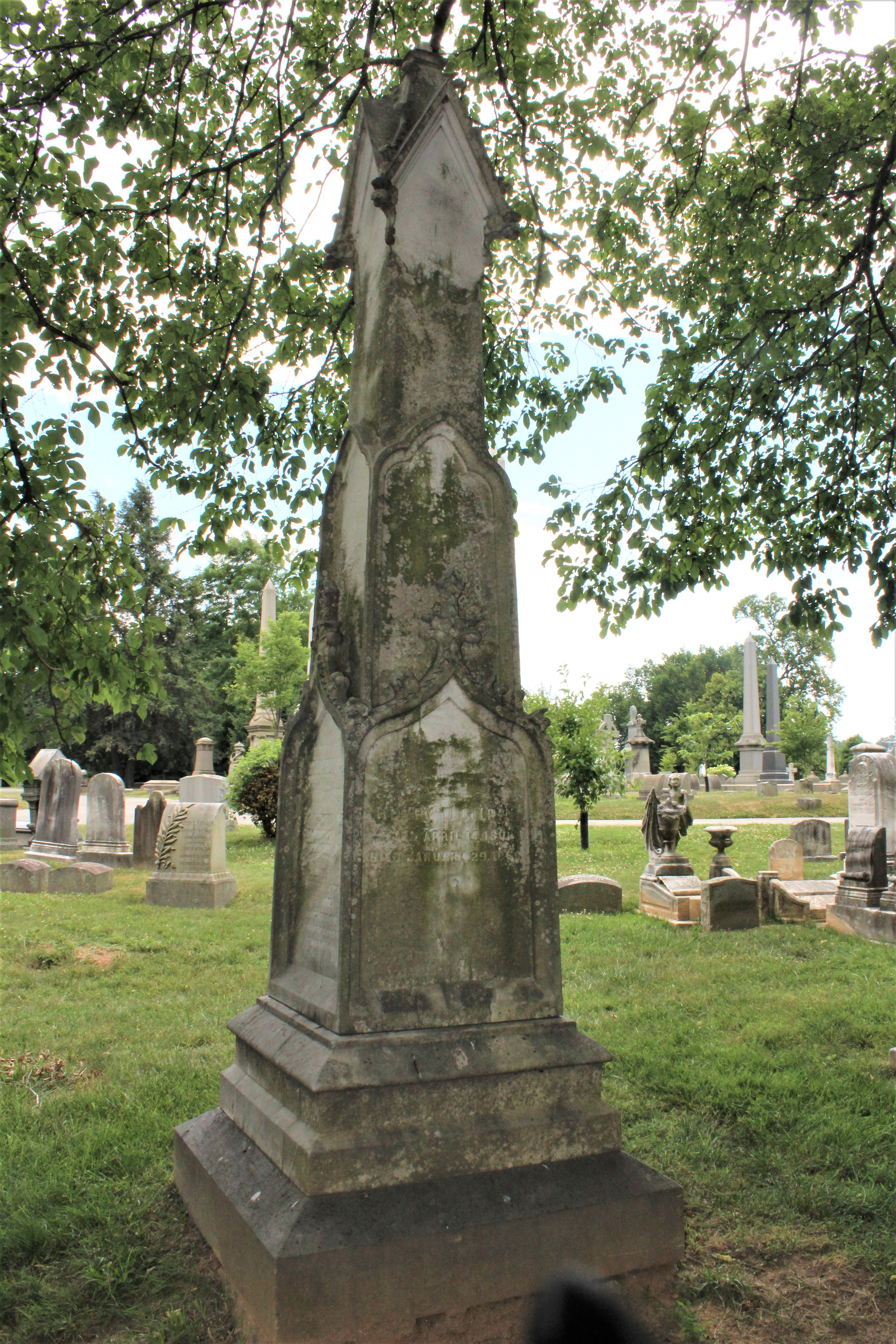
Henry Gilpin memorial in Laurel Hill Cemetery

His position with the Chesapeake and Delaware Canal allowed him to travel throughout the Eastern United States and his writings were later published by his father in a seven volume book titled Atlantic Souvenirs (1826-1832). He contributed articles on politics and literature to several newspapers and journals including the American Quarterly, the Democratic Review and the North American Review. He published several profiles of politicians including Henry Clay, Andrew Jackson and Daniel Webster. Gilpin died in Philadelphia in 1860 and was interred at Laurel Hill Cemetery.

== Legacy ==
The Henry D. Gilpin Fund was created by his will for the Chicago Historical Society to establish the Gilpin library.

== Bibliography ==
- An Annual Discourse Before the Pennsylvania Academy of the Fine Arts Delivered in the Hall of the Musical Fund Society, on the 29th of November 1826, H.C. Carey & I. Lea, Philadelphia (1827)
- A Biographical Sketch of Thomas Jefferson, Philadelphia (1828)
- The Papers of James Madison Purchased by Order of Congress; Being His Correspondence and Reports of Debates During the Congress of the Confederation and His Reports of Debates in the Federal Convention; Now Published From the Original Manuscripts, Deposited in the Department of State, By Direction of the Joint Library Committee of Congress, Under the Superintendence of Henry D. Gilpin, Langtree & O'Sullivan, Washington (1840)
- Address Delivered at the University of Pennsylvania Before the Philomathean Society on the Occasion of Their Biennial Celebration, May 23d 1845, King & Baird, Printers, Philadelphia (1845)

== Sources ==
- Gilpin, Eliza (1860). A Memorial of Henry D. Gilpin. ISBN 9780795018114.

Legal offices
Preceded by Felix Grundy	U.S. Attorney General; Served under: Martin Van Buren; 1840–1841	Succeeded by John J. Crittenden
Preceded by Virgil Maxcy	Solicitor of the United States Treasury; 1837–1840	Succeeded by Matthew Birchard
