= Westerhouse House =

Historic house in Virginia, United States

- U.S. National Register of Historic Places
- Virginia Landmarks Register
- Location within Virginia Location within the United States
- Location: West of Bridgetown off VA 619, near Bridgetown, Virginia
- Coordinates: 37°26′56″N 75°58′10″W
- Area: 22 acres (8.9 ha)
- Built: c. 1700
- Built by: Westerhouse, Adrian; Westerhouse, William
- Architectural style: Pre-Georgian
- NRHP reference No.: 74002139
- VLR No.: 065-0030

Significant dates
- Added to NRHP: November 19, 1974
- Designated VLR: September 17, 1974

Westerhouse House is a historic home located near Bridgetown, Northampton County, Virginia. It dates to about 1700, and is a small, one-story, four-bay, farmhouse with a steep gable roof and asymmetrical elevations. It features an exterior end chimney with a heavy pyramidal base, long sloping tiled weatherings and squat free-standing stack.

It was listed on the National Register of Historic Places in 1974.
