= Chuck Churn =

American baseball player (1930–2017)

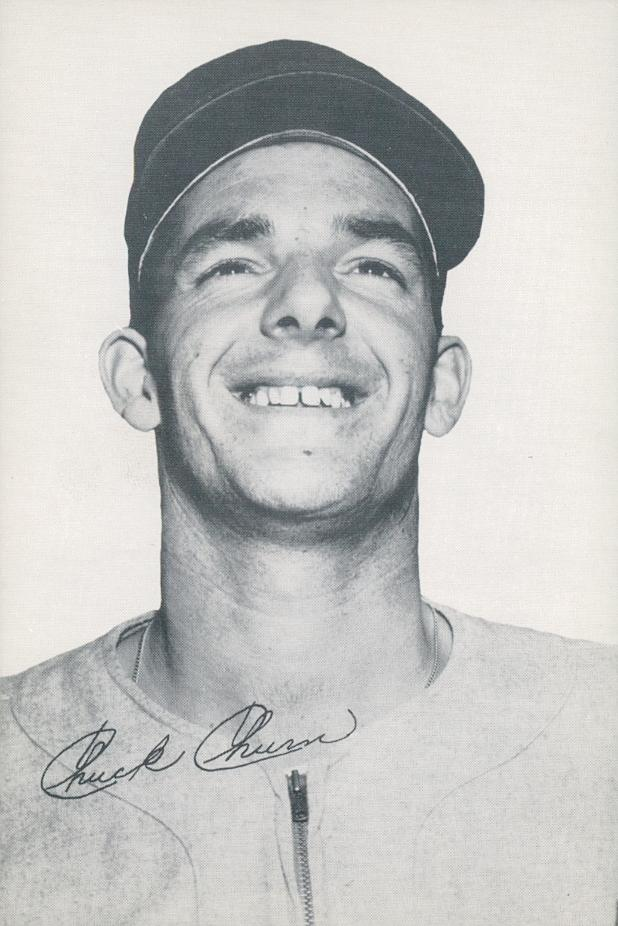
- Churn with the Hollywood Stars c. 1957
- Pitcher
- Born: February 1, 1930; Bridgetown, Virginia, U.S.
- Died: October 21, 2017 (aged 87); Lady Lake, Florida, U.S.
- Batted: Right Threw: Right

MLB debut
- April 18, 1957, for the Pittsburgh Pirates

Last MLB appearance
- September 29, 1959, for the Los Angeles Dodgers

MLB statistics
- Win–loss record: 3–2
- Earned run average: 5.10
- Strikeouts: 32
- Stats at Baseball Reference

Teams
- Pittsburgh Pirates (1957); Cleveland Indians (1958); Los Angeles Dodgers (1959)

Career highlights and awards
- World Series champion (1959)

Clarence Nottingham "Chuck" Churn (February 1, 1930 – October 21, 2017) was an American professional baseball player. The native of Bridgetown, Virginia, was a relief pitcher in Major League Baseball who appeared in 25 games for the Pittsburgh Pirates, Cleveland Indians and Los Angeles Dodgers between 1957 and 1959. He threw and batted right-handed and was listed as 6 feet 3 inches (1.91 m) tall and 205 pounds (93 kg).

== Early career ==
Churn was signed as an amateur free agent by the Pirates before the start of the 1949 season. After seven years in minor league baseball and one in military service, Churn was finally called up to the majors when he made the Pirates' pitching staff at the outset of the 1957 season. He made his debut on April 18, 1957, against the Brooklyn Dodgers, and gave up two hits and two runs in one inning pitched. Churn appeared in five games for the Pirates before being returned to the minors at the May cutdown, recording no decisions and a 4.32 earned run average, having given up four runs in 8 1/3 innings of work.

He was selected by the Boston Red Sox from Pittsburgh in the 1957 Rule 5 draft held on December 2. But the Red Sox placed Churn on waivers during spring training, and he was acquired on March 26, 1958, by the Cleveland Indians. He pitched in six games, all in relief, for the Indians during the early weeks of the 1958 season, with no decisions and a 6.23 ERA in 8 2/3 innings pitched. Then, in early May, he was purchased by the Cincinnati Redlegs and sent back to the Triple-A Seattle Rainiers for the rest of the season.

The Los Angeles Dodgers acquired Churn in a trade with the Reds on May 6, 1959, in exchange for Dick Hanlon and Churn was recalled from the Triple-A Spokane Indians in August.

== Role in 1959 pennant race ==
After going unscored upon in his first three appearances coming out of the Los Angeles bullpen, Churn earned his first-ever victory in the major leagues on September 2, 1959, when the Dodgers defeated the St. Louis Cardinals 9–6. Churn pitched one-run ball over the final 4 2/3 innings to get the win. Churn got his second victory on September 11 in the first game of a doubleheader against his original team, the Pirates. He came into the game in the eighth inning in relief of Sandy Koufax with the Dodgers down, 4–2. Los Angeles scored its third run in the eighth and then tallied twice off Elroy Face in the bottom of the ninth. Churn pitched 1 2/3 scoreless innings to get the 5–4 win. The loss was charged to Face, his only defeat in a season in which he finished with an 18–1 record.

With the Dodgers involved in a desperate pennant race with the Milwaukee Braves and San Francisco Giants, Churn's September wins—along with his only MLB save on September 19 against the Giants—were priceless. On the season's final day, Sunday, September 27, 1959, the Dodgers and Braves finished in flat-footed tie at 86–68, necessitating a best-of-three tie-breaker series to resolve the deadlock. After the Dodgers won Game 1, Churn appeared in the pivotal Game 2 on September 29. He relieved Johnny Podres with the bases loaded and two out in the top half of the seventh inning and Milwaukee ahead 4–2. He retired pinch hitter Enos Slaughter to quell the threat, but then surrendered what appeared to be an insurance run to Milwaukee in the eighth inning. He left the game for a pinch hitter in the bottom of the eighth with the Braves leading 5–2. However, in the bottom of the ninth, the Dodgers rallied for three runs to tie Game 2 and force extra innings. Three innings later, they won the game and the National League championship, sending them to the 1959 World Series.

Churn finished the 1959 season with a 3–2 record and one save to along with a 4.99 ERA in 14 appearances. He came on in relief of Roger Craig in the third inning of Game 1 of the 1959 Fall Classic, giving up six runs (two of them earned) in only two-thirds of an inning as the Dodgers lost to the Chicago White Sox 11–0. It was Churn's only World Series appearance as the Dodgers went on to win the world title in six games.

The 1959 season was Churn's last in the majors. Along with the five decisions and the save he posted for the Dodgers that season, he ended his career with 32 strikeouts in 47 2/3 total innings pitched, allowing 49 hits and 19 bases on balls.

Churn pitched full-time in the minor leagues through 1962, then became a playing coach and player-manager in the Houston Astros' farm system through 1967.

Churn, whose nickname was "Slim," died in Lady Lake, Florida on October 21, 2017, at age 87.
