= George P. Upshur =

Career officer in the US Navy (1799–1852)

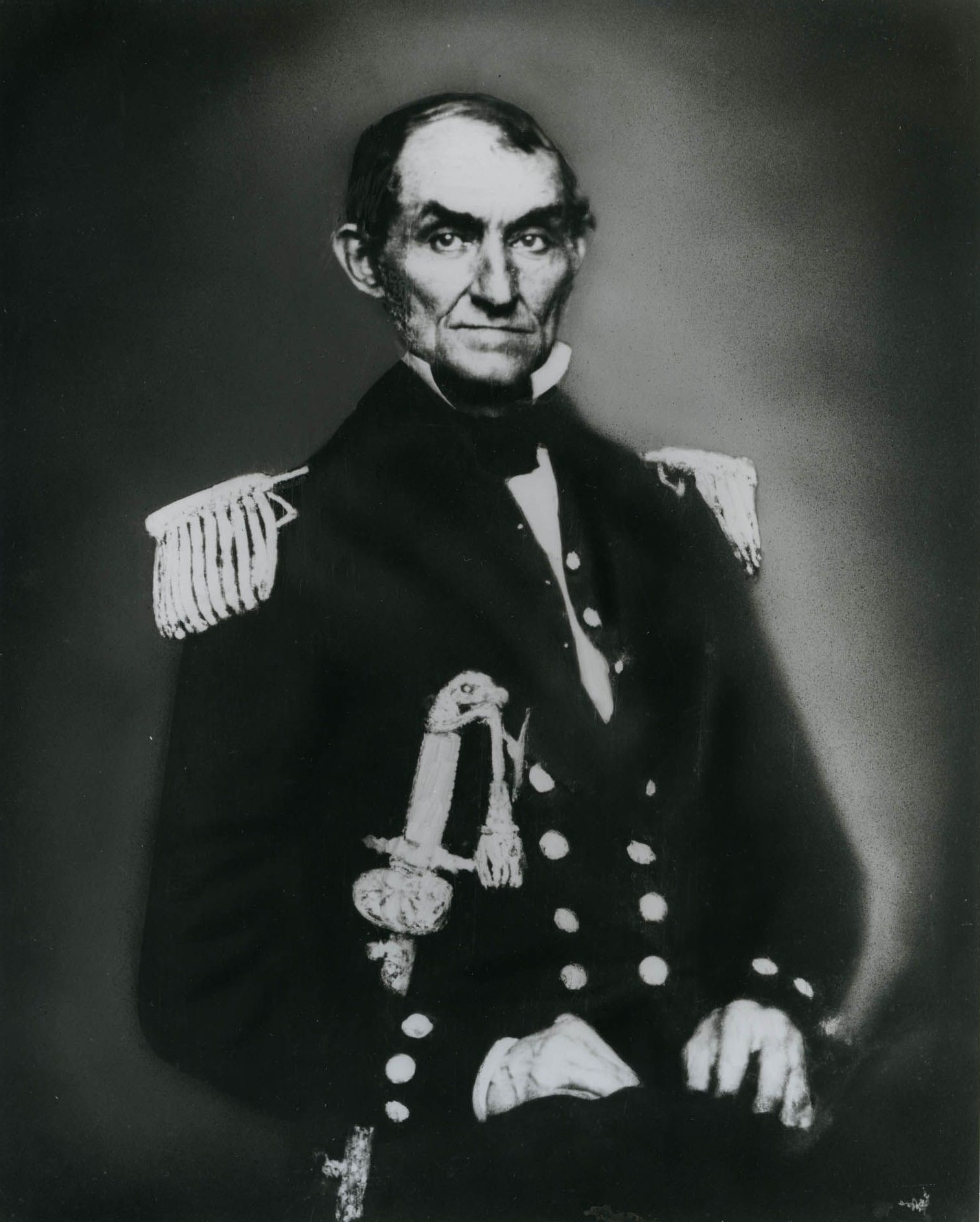
- Born: George Parker Upshur; March 8, 1799; Northampton County, Virginia, U.S.
- Died: November 3, 1852 (aged 53) USS Levant
- Allegiance: United States of America
- Branch: United States Navy
- Service years: 1818-1852
- Rank: Commander
- Commands: United States Navy
- Conflicts: Mexican American War

George Parker Upshur (8 March 1799 – 3 November 1852) was a career officer in the United States Navy and superintendent of the U.S. Naval Academy (1847–1850).

== Early and family life ==
Born in Northampton County, Virginia, among the dozen children borne to plantation owner and politician Littleton Upshur and his wife. His maternal grandfather was Virginia politician, planter and judge George Parker. His elder brother Abel P. Upshur inherited the family plantation and continued their father's political involvement, also serving in the Virginia House of Delegates and dying during a demonstration accident as U.S. Secretary of the Navy in 1842. His nephew John Henry Upshur (1823–1889) also became a career naval officer, and rose to the rank of rear admiral. As a midshipman, J.H. Upshur participated in the Mexican American War, despite his family's generations of slave ownership, served on a frigate which helped suppress the trans-Atlantic slave trade in 1855, and remained loyal to the Union during the U.S. Civil War, during which he took part in engagements at Fort Fisher as well as participated in the blockading squadron.

== Career ==
George Upshur entered the United States Navy as midshipman on April 23, 1818; was promoted to lieutenant, March 3, 1827, and served in the USS Lexington, on the Brazil station, 1832–34, against the pirates infesting the Falkland Islands. He commanded the brig USS Truxtun on her first cruise in the Mediterranean in 1843-44, and from 1844 until 1847 served in the receiving ship at Norfolk, Virginia. He was commissioned commander, February 27, 1847, and from that year until 1850 was superintendent of the United States Naval Academy at Annapolis.

On July 13, 1852, Commander Ushur took command of the sloop-of-war USS Levant, at Norfolk. Levant joined the United States squadron in the Mediterranean, but Upshur died on board his ship, in the harbor of Spezia, Italy, November 3, 1852.

== Legacy ==
His home from 1836 to 1847 was Caserta, near Eastville, Virginia. It was listed on the National Register of Historic Places in 1970 and delisted in 2001, after being destroyed by fire in 1975.

Military offices
Preceded by Franklin Buchanan	Superintendent of United States Naval Academy; 1847-1850	Succeeded by Cornelius Stribling
