= Gilbert, Virginia =

Unincorporated community in Virginia, United States

Gilbert
- Unincorporated community
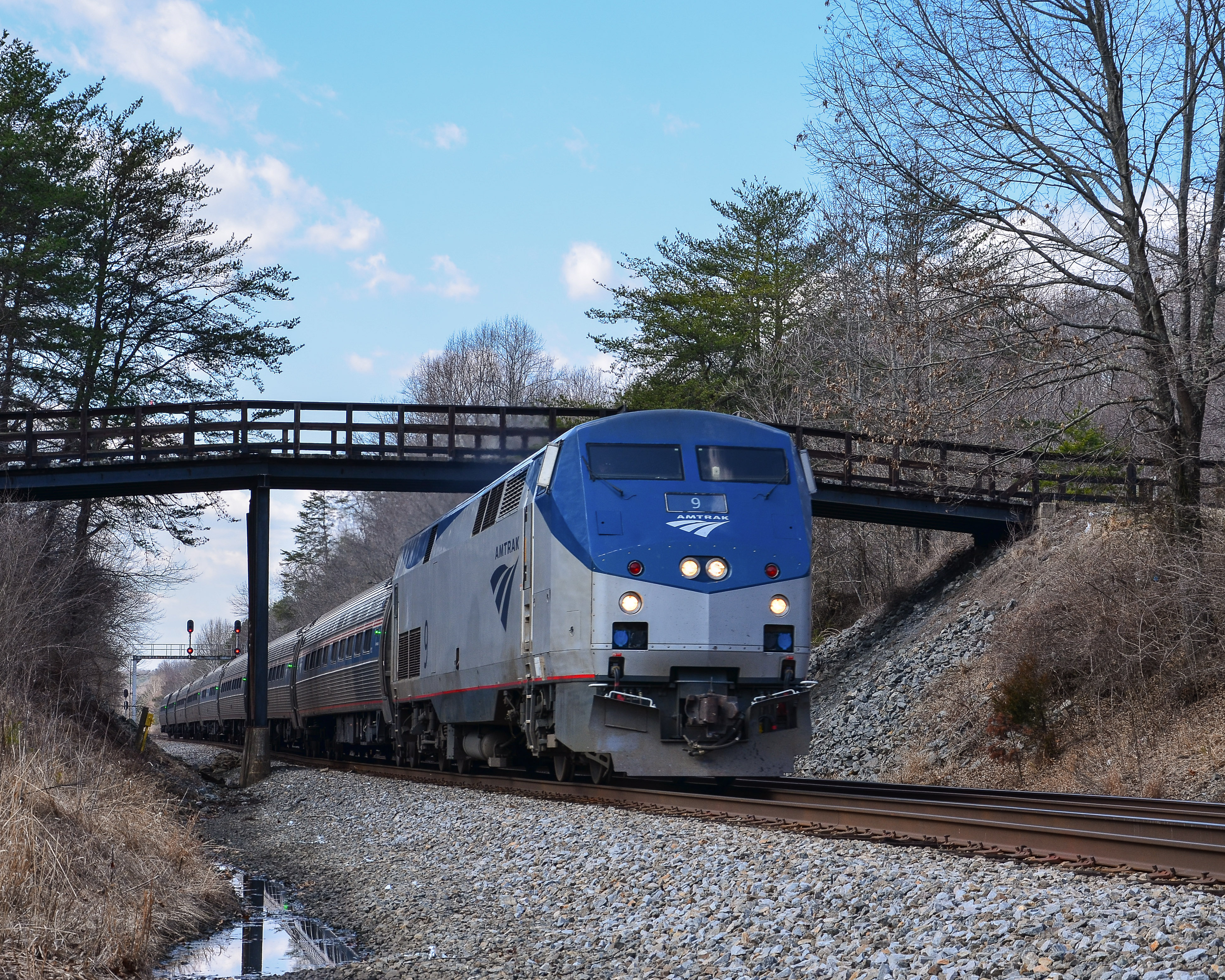
- An Amtrak train passes under the bridge for Gilbert Station Road on the NS Washington District in Gilbert, Virginia.

- Location within the Commonwealth of Virginia Gilbert (the United States)
- Coordinates: 38°08′45″N 78°22′26″W
- Country: United States
- State: Virginia
- County: Albemarle
- Time zone: UTC−5 (Eastern (EST))
  - Summer (DST): UTC−4 (EDT)
- GNIS feature ID: 1492996

Gilbert is an unincorporated community in Albemarle County, Virginia, United States.
