= Thomas Walker Gilmer =

American politician (1802–1844)

Thomas Gilmer
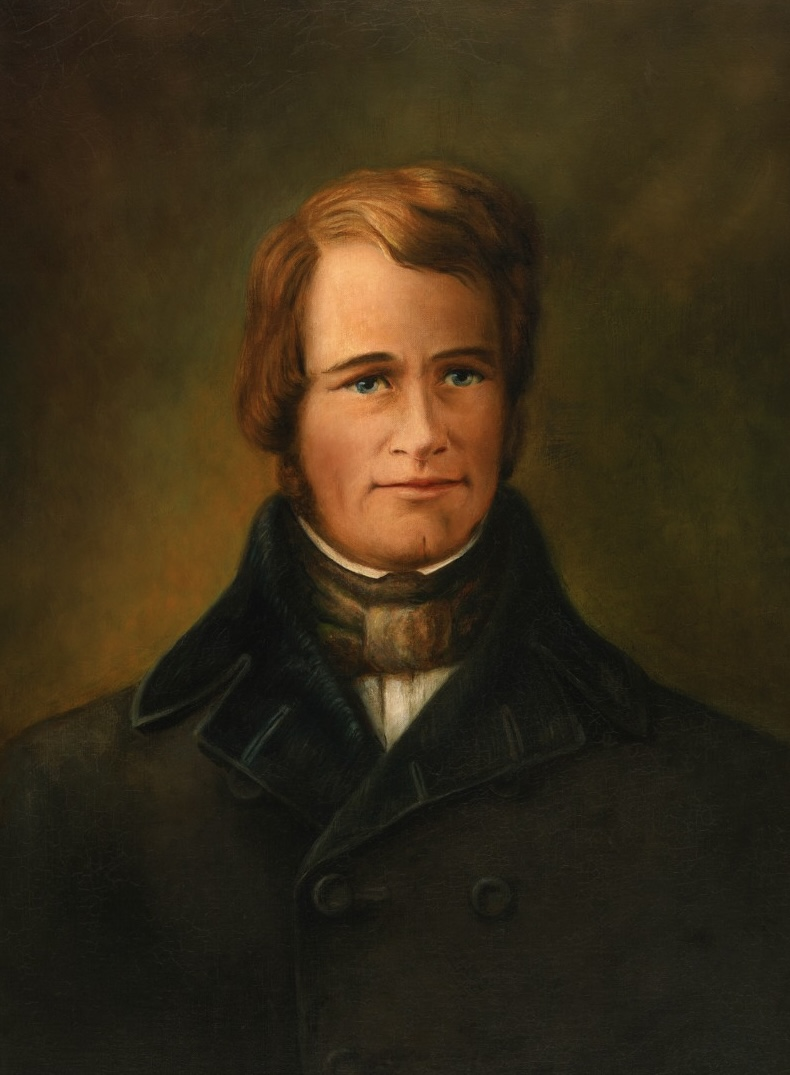

15th United States Secretary of the Navy
- In office February 19, 1844 – February 28, 1844
- President: John Tyler
- Preceded by: David Henshaw
- Succeeded by: John Y. Mason

Member of the U.S. House of Representatives from Virginia
- In office March 4, 1841 – February 16, 1844
- Preceded by: James Garland
- Succeeded by: William L. Goggin
- Constituency: 12th district (1841–43); 5th district (1843–44)

28th Governor of Virginia
- In office March 31, 1840 – March 20, 1841
- Preceded by: David Campbell
- Succeeded by: John M. Patton (acting)

18th Speaker of the Virginia House of Delegates
- In office 1839–1840
- Preceded by: Linn Banks
- Succeeded by: Valentine W. Southall

Member of the Virginia House of Delegates from Albemarle County
- In office 1829-1836
- In office 1839-1840

Personal details
- Born: Thomas Walker Gilmer; April 6, 1802 Albemarle County, Virginia, U.S.
- Died: February 28, 1844 (aged 41) Potomac River, Maryland, U.S.
- Resting place: Mount Air Cemetery; Gilbert, Virginia, U.S.
- Party: Whig (Before 1842); Democratic (1842–1844)
- Spouse: Anne Baker
- Children: 9

Thomas Walker Gilmer (April 6, 1802 – February 28, 1844) was an American statesman. He served in several political positions in Virginia, including election as the 28th governor of Virginia. Gilmer's final political office was as the 15th secretary of the Navy, but he died in an accident ten days after assuming that position.

== Personal life ==
Gilmer was born to George Gilmer and Elizabeth Anderson Hudson at their farm, "Gilmerton", in Albemarle County, Virginia. He was taught by private tutors and his uncle Peachy Ridgeway Gilmer in Charlottesville and Staunton, and studied law in Liberty (now Bedford), Virginia.

Gilmer practiced law in Charlottesville. He was, briefly, editor of the Virginia Advocate, a Charlottesville newspaper.

On 13 May 1826, Gilmer married Anne Elizabeth Baker of Shepherdstown, now in West Virginia. Her late father, John Baker, had been a member of the United States House of Representatives. They had nine children, including George Hudson Gilmer, a Presbyterian minister.

In 1829, Gilmer purchased Israel Jefferson, a former slave of Thomas Jefferson, who is best known for claiming that Sally Hemings was Thomas Jefferson's concubine. Gilmer later agreed to let Israel pay his own purchase price for his freedom after Gilmer's election to congress, as Israel desired to stay with his wife, a free woman.

== Political career ==
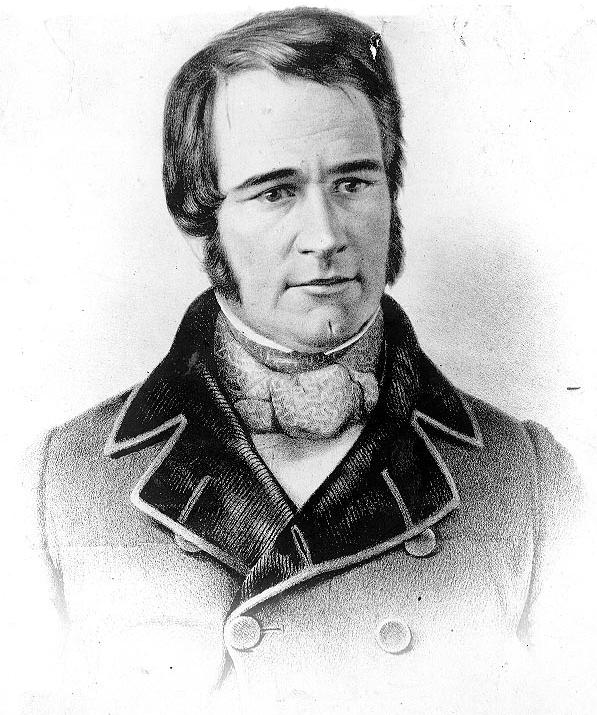
Sketch of Thomas W. Gilmer

Gilmer first served in the Virginia House of Delegates from 1829 to 1836, representing Albemarle County. He returned in 1839–40 and was named Speaker.

On February 14, 1840, Gilmer was elected the 28th governor of Virginia. While in office, he disagreed with the Virginia General Assembly over the extradition of slave stealers, which played a part in his running for Congress the following winter.

In March 1841, he entered the 27th Congress as a Whig, and after John Tyler unexpectedly ascended to the presidency, Gilmer voted to sustain Tyler's vetoes of legislation favored by other Whigs. Gilmer was re-elected to the 28th Congress as a Democrat in 1842 by a close vote. His competitor, William L. Goggin, contested the result, but before the report of the investigating committee, which recommended that Gilmer be seated, could be acted on, Gilmer resigned from Congress to accept Tyler's nomination as Secretary of the Navy. Goggin then won the special election to fill the vacant seat.

As one of President John Tyler's close Virginia allies in Washington, Gilmer was involved in the effort by the Tyler Administration to make the annexation of Texas the basis for his failed bid for re-election in 1844. On February 15, 1844, he was appointed by Tyler to be the U.S. Secretary of the Navy, and resigned his seat in the Congress the next day to enter on the duties of the office; but, ten days later, he was killed by the bursting of a bow gun on board USS Princeton while on a tour of the Potomac River below Washington. His death meant the loss of a valuable ally for Tyler, and some historians suggest that it may have delayed the Texas Annexation effort.

=== Electoral history ===
In 1842, Gilmer was elected to the U.S. House of Representatives with 50.21% of the vote, defeating William Leftwich Goggin.

== Legacy ==
Gilmer is buried at Mount Air Cemetery in Gilbert, Virginia.

A year after his death, Gilmer County, Virginia was named in his honor; it is now part of West Virginia.

The city of Gilmer, Texas, is also named for him. (Gilmer is the county seat of surrounding Upshur County, Texas, named after Abel Parker Upshur, (1790–1844), another victim of the USS Princeton explosion which had taken Gilmer's life.)

Two ships of the United States Navy over the years have been named USS Gilmer in his honor.

== Notes ==
Political offices
Preceded by Linn Banks	Speaker of the Virginia House of Delegates; 1839–1840	Succeeded by Valentine W. Southall
Preceded by David Campbell	Governor of Virginia; March 31, 1840 – March 20, 1841	Succeeded by John M. Patton; Acting Governor
U.S. House of Representatives
Preceded by James Garland	Member of the U.S. House of Representatives from Virginia's 12th congressional district March 4, 1841 – March 3, 1843	Succeeded by Augustus A. Chapman
Preceded by Edmund W. Hubard	Member of the U.S. House of Representatives from Virginia's 5th congressional district March 4, 1843 – February 16, 1844	Succeeded by William L. Goggin
Government offices
Preceded by David Henshaw	United States Secretary of the Navy; February 19, 1844 – February 24, 1844	Succeeded by John Y. Mason
