= USS Princeton (1843) =

American warship

Coordinates: 42.3746°N 71.0480°W

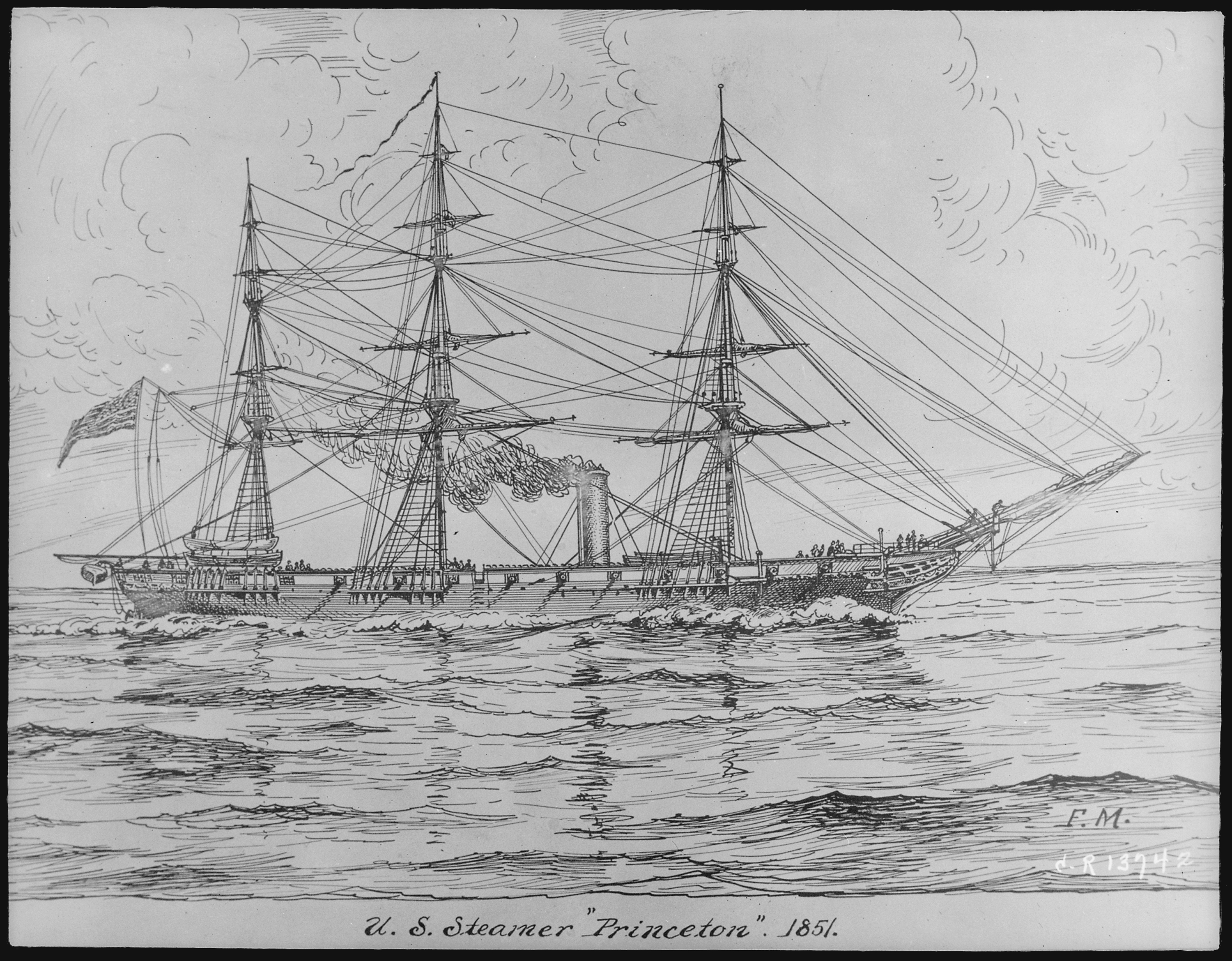
- USS Princeton

History

United States
- Name: Princeton
- Namesake: Princeton, New Jersey
- Ordered: 18 November 1841
- Builder: Philadelphia Navy Yard
- Laid down: 20 October 1842
- Launched: 5 September 1843
- Commissioned: 9 September 1843
- Decommissioned: October 1849
- Fate: Broken up

USS Princeton was a screw steam warship of the United States Navy. Commanded by Captain Robert F. Stockton, Princeton was launched on 5 September 1843.

On 28 February 1844, during a Potomac River pleasure cruise for dignitaries, one gun exploded, killing six people, including Secretary of State Abel P. Upshur and Secretary of the Navy Thomas Walker Gilmer, and injuring others, including a United States Senator and Captain Stockton. The disaster on board the Princeton killed more top US government officials in one day than any other tragedy in American history. President John Tyler, who was aboard but below decks, was not injured. The ship's reputation in the Navy never recovered.

== Design ==
=== Machinery ===
Princeton was the first ship with screw propellers powered by engines mounted below the waterline to protect them from gunfire. Her two vibrating lever engines, designed by John Ericsson, were built by Merrick & Towne. (Note: Merrick & Towne was a foundry based in Philadelphia, founded by John Henry Towne and a Mr. S. V. Merrick, and also notable for building the engines of the USS Mississippi. It was later renamed Merrick & Sons.) They burned hard coal and drove a 14 ft (4.3 m) six-bladed screw. Ericsson also designed the ship's collapsible funnel, an improved range-finder, and recoil systems for the main guns.

=== Guns ===
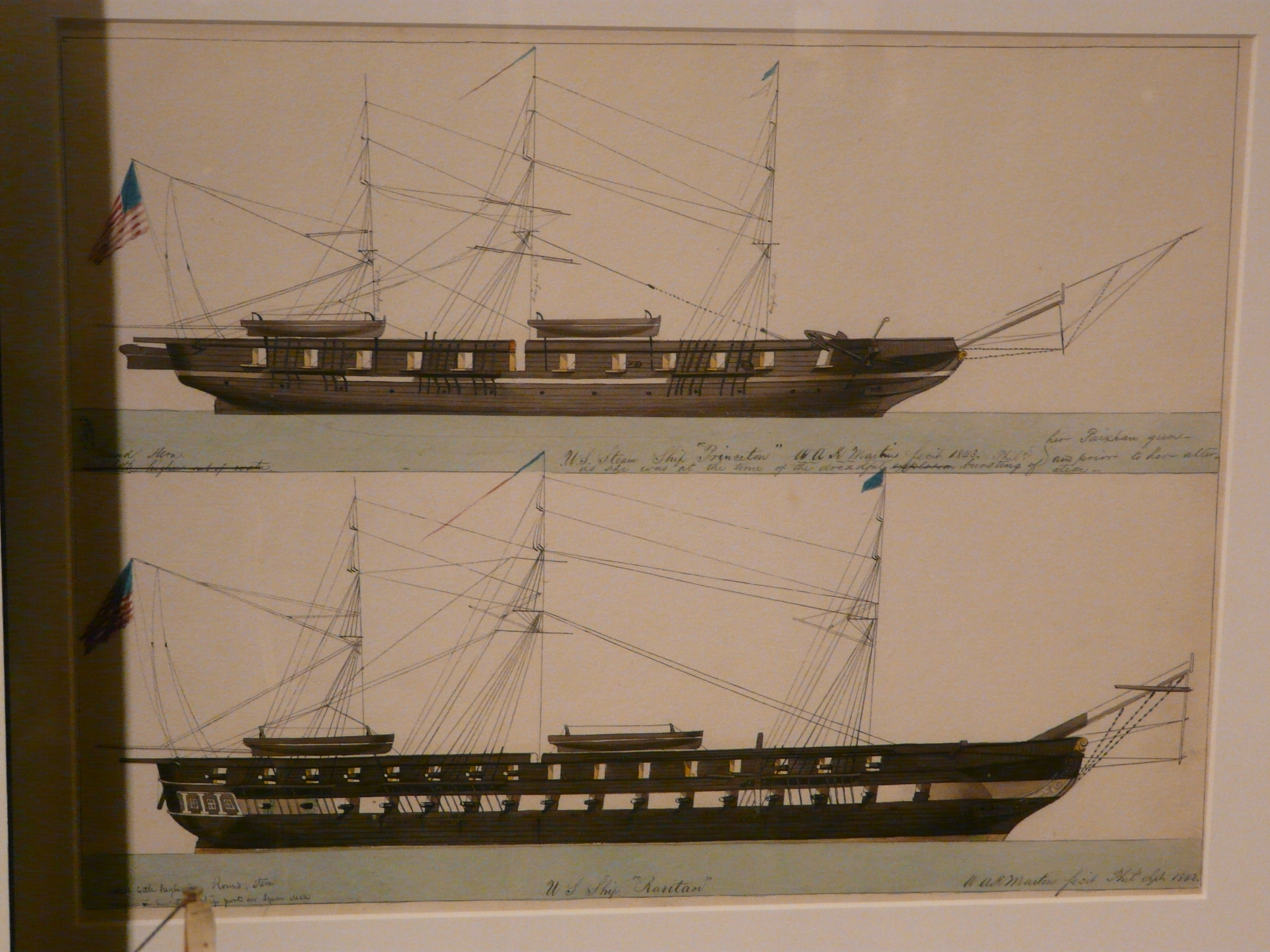
US Steam Ship Princeton and US Ship Raritan

Twelve 42-pound (19 kg) carronades were mounted within the ship's iron hull.

Ericsson had also designed the ship to mount one long gun.

The gun, a smooth bore muzzleloader made of wrought iron, was built by the Mersey Iron Works, in Liverpool, England. It could fire a 225-pound (102 kg), 12-inch (300 mm) shot 5 mi (8.0 km) using a 50 lb (23 kg) charge. Its revolutionary design used "built-up construction", placing red-hot iron hoops around the breech end of the weapon, which pre-tensioned the gun and greatly increased the charge the breech could withstand. Originally named "The Orator" by Ericsson, Stockton renamed it the "Oregon gun". It was shipped to the United States in 1841, where it was tested, reinforced to prevent cracks, and proof-fired more than 150 times.

Captain Stockton wanted his ship to carry two long guns, so he designed and directed the construction of "Peacemaker", another 12-in muzzleloader, by Hogg and DeLamater of New York City. "Peacemaker" was built with older forging technology, creating a larger gun of more impressive appearance, but lower strength. Stockton rushed "Peacemaker" and mounted it without much testing. According to Kilner, "Peacemaker" was "fired only five times before certifying it as accurate and fully proofed."

Attempting to copy the "Oregon gun", but not understanding the importance of Ericsson's hoop construction, Stockton instead heavily reinforced it at the breech simply by making the metal of the gun thicker, ending up with a weight of more than 27,000 lb (12,000 kg), more than half again as heavy as the Oregon gun. This produced a gun with the typical weakness of a wrought iron gun, the breech unable to withstand the transverse forces of the charge. This meant it was almost certain to burst at some point.

== Construction ==
Princeton was laid down on 20 October 1842, at the Philadelphia Navy Yard, as a 954 long tons (969 t) screw steamer. The designer of the ship and main supervisor of construction was the Swedish inventor John Ericsson, who later designed USS Monitor. The construction was partly supervised by Captain Stockton, who had secured political support for the ship's construction. The ship was named after Princeton, New Jersey, site of an American victory in the Revolutionary War and hometown of the prominent Stockton family. The ship was launched on 5 September 1843, and commissioned on 9 September 1843, with Captain Stockton commanding.

== Service history ==
Princeton made a trial trip in the Delaware River, on 12 October 1843. She departed Philadelphia, on 17 October, for a sea trial, proceeded to New York, where she raced and easily beat the British steamer SS Great Western, and returned to Philadelphia on 20 October, to finish outfitting. On 22 November, Captain Stockton reported, "Princeton will be ready for sea in a week." On 28 November, he dressed ship and received visitors on board for inspection. On 30 November, she towed USS Raritan down the Delaware, and later returned to the Philadelphia Navy Yard. Princeton sailed on 1 January 1844, for New York, where she received her two big guns, "Peacemaker" and "Oregon". Princeton sailed to Washington, on 13 February. Washingtonians displayed great interest in the ship and her guns. She made trial trips with passengers on board down the Potomac River, on 16, 18, and 20 February, during which "Peacemaker" was fired several times. The Tyler administration promoted the ship as part of its campaign for naval expansion, and Congress adjourned for 20 February, so that members could tour the ship. Former President John Quincy Adams, now a congressman and skeptical of both territorial expansion and the armaments required to support it, said the Navy welcomed politicians "to fire their souls with patriotic ardor for a naval war".

== 1844 Peacemaker accident ==
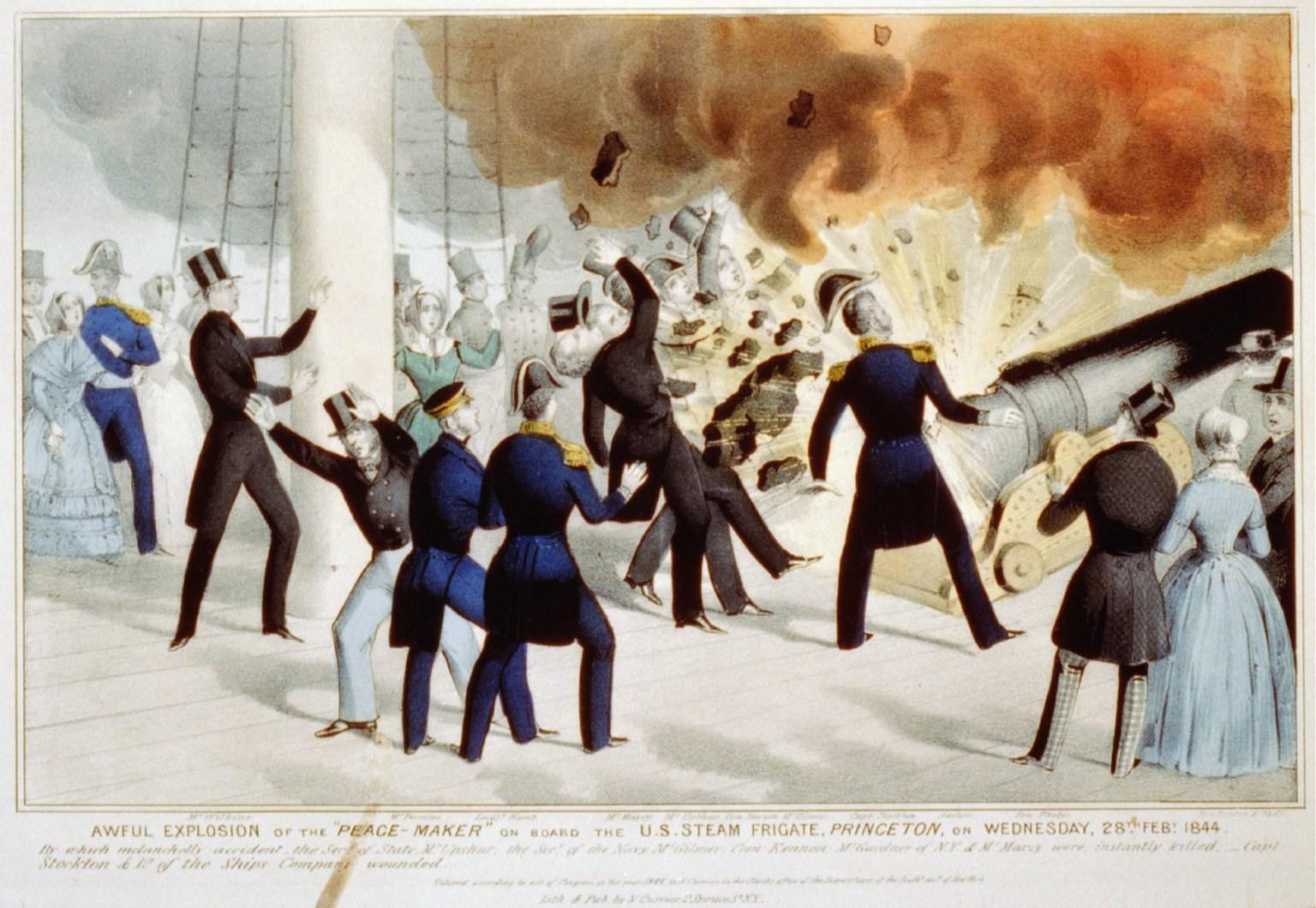
Contemporary Currier & Ives lithograph depicting the explosion

President Tyler hosted a public reception for Stockton in the White House on 27 February 1844. On 28 February, Princeton departed Alexandria, Virginia, on a demonstration cruise down the Potomac with Tyler, members of his cabinet, former First Lady Dolley Madison, Senators Thomas Hart Benton of Missouri, Nathaniel P. Tallmadge of New York, William Cabell Rives of Virginia, Samuel S. Phelps of Vermont, Spencer Jarnagin of Tennessee, Edward A. Hannegan of Indiana, and about 400 guests. Captain Stockton decided to fire the larger of the ship's two long guns, Peacemaker, to impress his guests. Peacemaker was fired three times on the trip downriver and was loaded to fire a salute to George Washington as the ship passed Mount Vernon on the return trip. The guests aboard viewed the first set of firings and then retired below decks for lunch and refreshments.

Secretary Gilmer urged those aboard to view a final shot with the Peacemaker. When Captain Stockton pulled the firing lanyard, the gun burst. Its left side failed, spraying hot metal across the deck and fragmentation into the crowd.

Six men were instantly killed:

- Secretary of State Abel Upshur
- Secretary of the Navy Thomas Walker Gilmer
- Captain Beverley Kennon, Chief of the Bureau of Construction, Equipment and Repairs (Note: Beverley Kennon (1793–1844) served in the U.S Navy and saw action during the Second Barbary War (1815–1816). He commanded several ships beginning in 1830 and was responsible for the Washington Navy Yard from April 1841 to March 1843, when he became Chief of the Navy's Bureau of Construction, Equipment, and Repairs. He was a lifelong friend of Upshur.)
- Armistead, an enslaved African-American who worked as President Tyler's valet (Note: Congressman George Sykes of New Jersey, an eyewitness, described Armistead as "a stout black man about 23 or 24 years old" and reported that he lived for a short while after the explosion and that "neither the surgeon of the Princeton nor any other person could discover the slightest wound or injury about him".)
- David Gardiner, a New York lawyer and politician (Note: He managed the property his wealthy wife had inherited and had served for four years in the New York State Senate. Contemporaneous accounts refer to him as Colonel David Gardiner, but that was an error. His son, David L. Gardiner, had recently been appointed Tyler's aide-de-camp with the rank of colonel.)
- Virgil Maxcy, a Maryland attorney with decades of experience as a state and federal officeholder (Note: Born in 1785, his federal career included service as Solicitor of the U.S. Treasury from 1830 to 1837 and Chargé d'Affaires to Belgium from 1837 to 1842. He was a political ally of Calhoun and an advocate of the resettlement of free blacks in Africa.)

Another 16 to 20 people were injured, including several members of the ship's crew, Senator Benton, and Captain Stockton. The president was below decks and not injured.

Tyler had become president after the death of William Henry Harrison, and there would be no Constitutional mechanism to fill an intra-term vacancy in the position of vice-president until the Twenty-Fifth Amendment was ratified in 1967; therefore he had no vice-president. If Tyler had been killed in the incident, under the terms of the Presidential line of succession the current President pro tempore of the Senate Willie P. Mangum would have become Acting President.

=== Aftermath ===
Rather than ascribe responsibility for the explosion to individuals, Tyler wrote to Congress the next day that the disaster "must be set down as one of the casualties which, to a greater or lesser degree, attend upon every service, and which are invariably incident to the temporal affairs of mankind". He said it should not affect lawmakers' positive assessment of Stockton and his improvements in ship construction.

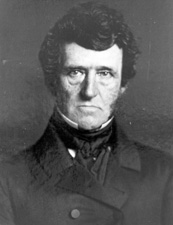
Captain Robert Stockton

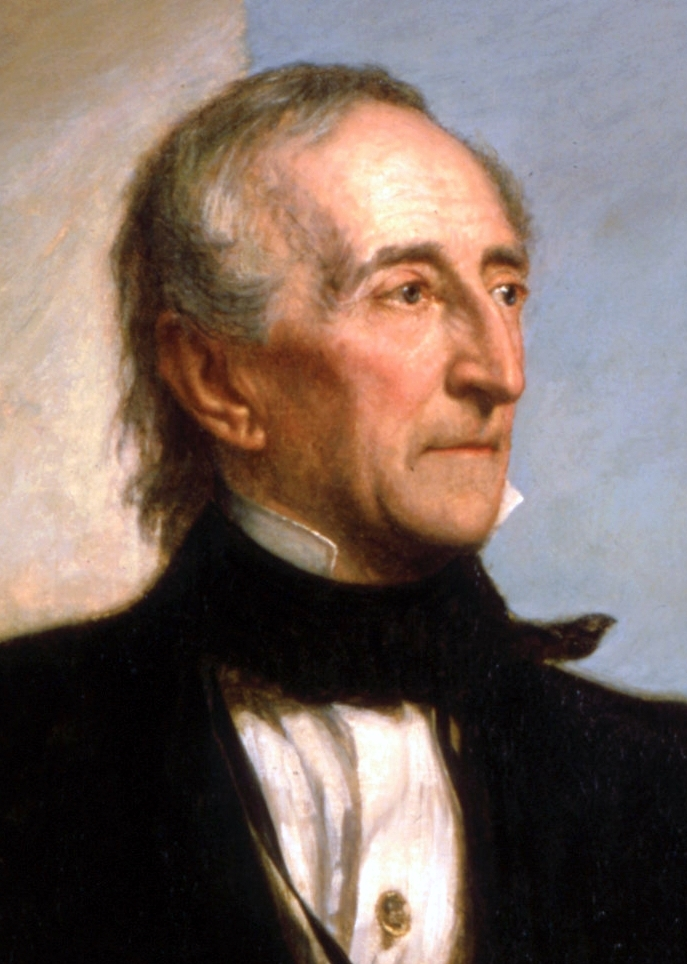
President John Tyler

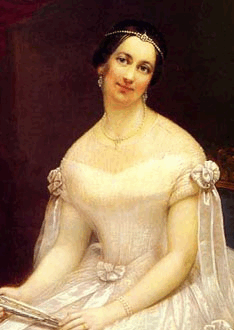
First Lady Julia Tyler

Plans to construct more ships modeled on Princeton were promptly scrapped. Still, Tyler won Congressional approval to construct a single gun on the dimensions of the Peacemaker, fired once and never mounted. A Court of Inquiry investigated the cause of the explosion and found that all those involved had taken appropriate precautions. (Note: "The court found that every precaution skill could devise had been taken.") At Stockton's request, the Committee on Science and Arts of the Franklin Institute conducted its own inquiry, which criticized many details of the manufacturing process, as well as the use of a welded band for reinforcement rather than the shrinking technique used on the Oregon. Ericsson, whom Stockton had originally paid $1,150 for designing and outfitting Princeton, sought another $15,000 for his additional efforts and expertise. He sued Stockton for payment and won in court, but the funds were never appropriated. Stockton went on to serve as Military Governor of California and a United States Senator from New Jersey. Ericsson had a distinguished career in naval design and is best known for his work on USS Monitor, the U.S. Navy's first ironclad warship.

To succeed Gilmer as Secretary of the Navy, Tyler appointed John Y. Mason, another Virginian; John C. Calhoun was Tyler's replacement for Secretary of State Upshur. Upshur was about to win Senate approval of a treaty annexing Texas when he died. Under Calhoun, annexation was delayed and became a principal issue in the presidential election of 1844.

Julia Gardiner, who was below decks on Princeton when her father David died in the Peacemaker explosion, became First Lady of the United States four months later. She had declined President Tyler's marriage proposal a year earlier, and sometime in 1843, they agreed they would marry but set no date. The President had lost his first wife in September 1842, and at the time of the explosion, he was almost 54. Julia was not yet 24. She later explained that her father's death changed her feelings for the President: "After I lost my father I felt differently toward the President. He seemed to fill the place and to be more agreeable in every way than any younger man ever was or could be." Because he had been widowed less than two years and her father had died so recently, they married in the presence of just a few family members in New York City on June 26, 1844. A public announcement followed the ceremony. They had seven children before Tyler died in 1862, and his wife never remarried. In 1888, Julia Gardiner told journalist Nellie Bly that at the moment of the Peacemaker explosion, "I fainted and did not revive until someone was carrying me off the boat, and I struggled so that I almost knocked us both off the gangplank". She said she later learned that President Tyler was her rescuer. (Note: The interview appeared in the New York World on October 28, 1888.) Some historians question her account.

The Peacemaker disaster prompted a reexamination of the process used to manufacture cannons. This led to the development of new techniques that produced cannons that were stronger and more structurally sound, such as the systems pioneered by Thomas Rodman and John A. Dahlgren.

== Later history ==
During construction and in the years following, Stockton attempted to claim complete credit for the design and construction of Princeton.

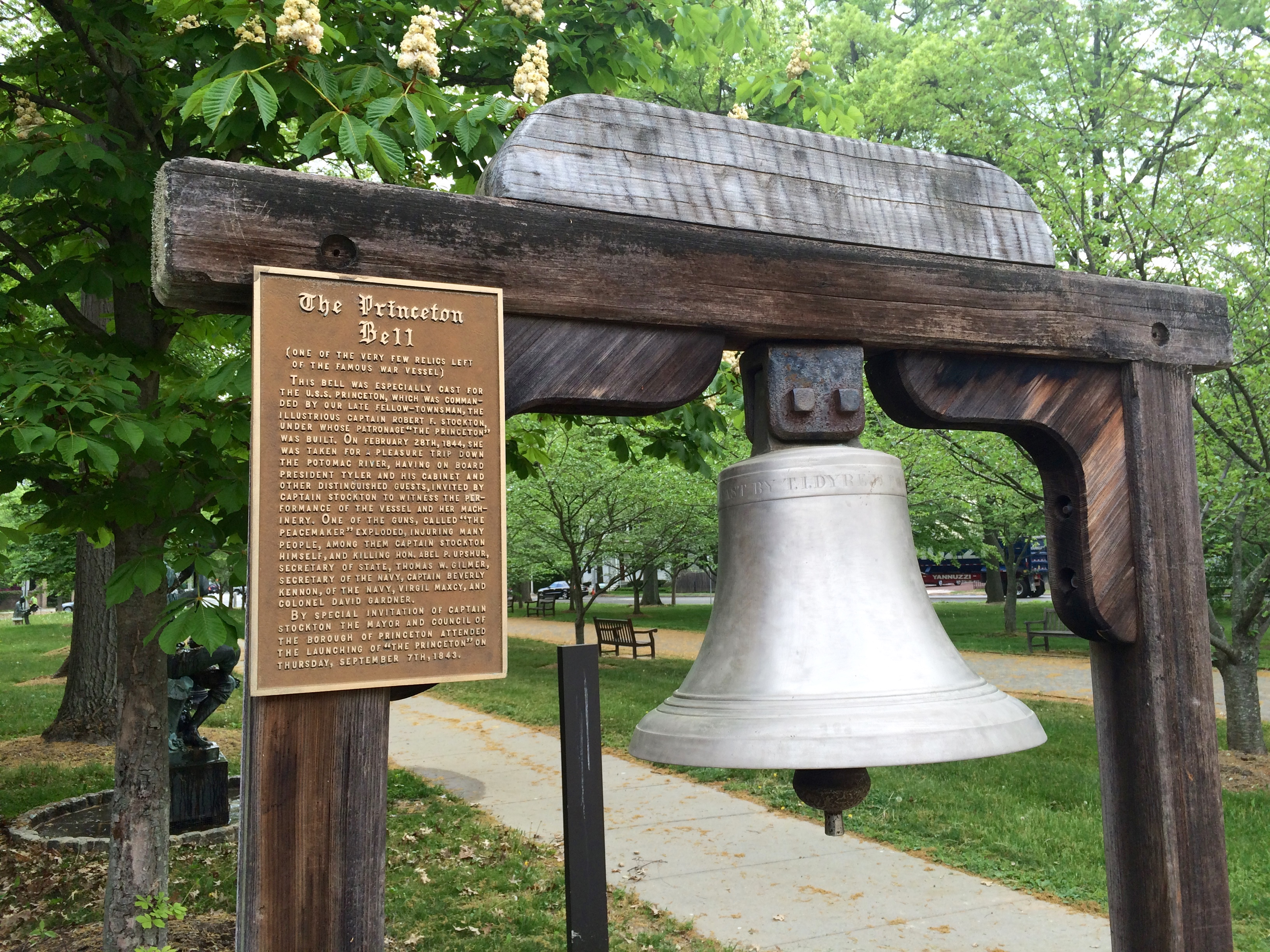
USS Princeton Bell at Stockton Street and Bayard Lane in Princeton, New Jersey

Princeton was employed with the Home Squadron from 1845 to 1847. She later served in the Mediterranean from 17 August 1847 to 24 June 1849. Upon her return from Europe, she was surveyed and found to require $68,000 ($2.63 million in present-day terms) to replace decaying timber and make other repairs. The price was deemed unacceptable, and a second survey was ordered. She was broken up at the Boston Navy Yard that October and November.

== Legacy ==
In 1851, her "Ericsson semi-cylinder" design engines and some usable timbers were incorporated in the construction of the second Princeton.

The "Oregon" gun is on display inside the main gate of the United States Naval Academy, in Annapolis, Maryland.

The ship's bell was displayed during the 1907 Jamestown Exposition. It was later installed on the porch of Princeton University's Thomson Hall, which was constructed as a private residence in 1825, by Robert Stockton's father, Richard. It is now on display at the Princeton Battle Monument, near Princeton's borough hall.
