= Bayford =

Bayford may refer to:

People

- Baron Bayford, a title in the Peerage of the United Kingdom
- David Bayford (1739–1790), English surgeon
- Dick Bayford (1885–1939), Australian rules footballer
- James Bayford (1804–1871), English rower
- Robert Augustus Bayford (1838–1922), English lawyer
- Robert Frederic Bayford (1871–1951), English lawyer

Places

- Bayford, Hertfordshire, England
  - Bayford railway station
- Bayford, Somerset, England
- Bayford, Virginia

Other

- Bayford & Co, a British conglomerate company
