= Market Street Massacre =

1948 mass shooting in Chester, Pennsylvania, US

- Location: 39.8464°N 75.3584°W; Chester, Pennsylvania, US
- Date: November 6, 1948; 78 years ago 8:15 – 9:20 a.m. (ETZ)
- Attack type: Mass shooting; murder–suicide; child murder
- Weapon: .22-caliber Springfield rifle
- Deaths: 9 (including the perpetrator)
- Injuries: 5 (3 by gunfire, 2 indirectly)
- Perpetrator: Melvin Collins

The Market Street Massacre occurred on November 6, 1948, in Chester, Pennsylvania, United States. Eight people were killed and five were injured before the gunman, 38-year-old Melvin Collins, killed himself during police arrival.

== Shooting ==
At 8:15 a.m., Collins barricaded the entrance of his boarding room. He then leaned out the window and yelled to a group of four men standing below, "Call the cops", before dropping a dime onto the street. One of the men picked up the dime and handed it to another man, Harry Gibbs, who said, "This will get me a cup of coffee." Collins then aimed his .22 caliber rifle out the window and shot one of the men, Edward Boyer, killing him on the spot. The crowd dispersed as Collins continued to fire at people outside.

Detective Elery Purnsley, who was across the street, rushed to the scene and ordered Collins to drop his weapon. When Collins aimed the gun at him, Purnsley fired three times at Collins, grazing his chin. Purnsley was killed when Collins returned fire. Purnsley collapsed, falling against the side of a car operated by Fred Casino (the only non-African American victim), who was driving by the scene. Casino got out of his car and was attempting to assist Pursney when he was killed by Collins. Purnsley's son Bert and another man, Alfred Green, were also shot at when they walked out of a restaurant to reach Purnsley's body. James Simon was killed while he was inside of a cleaning shop.

The gunshots attracted the attention of other passersby and neighbors, some of whom peered through the windows. Collins fatally shot Louise Moore and injured Hattie Nichols as the two were looking out of a window in Moore's apartment. Monroe Wyche was wounded by flying glass shards as he attempted to help the two women. Moore died of her injuries in a hospital nine hours later.

As the first three officers of the Chester Police Department arrived, three passersby were fatally shot. Samuel Lytle (also reported as Aiken Johnson), described as a "deaf-mute" and nicknamed "Deafy", was shot and killed on the street. Peter Parker and Samuel Hill were attempting to flee to safety when both were fatally wounded; they were pronounced dead within ten minutes of their arrival at Chester Hospital.

Initially, police did not make use of their service weapons, as they wanted to avoid potentially hitting other residents or each other. A combined task force of seventy-eight policemen, both the local department and Pennsylvania State Police, arrived at the scene, armed with shotguns and submachine guns. The task forced fired on Collins' position, also hurling a total of twenty tear gas canisters into the window. A loan officer provided police with two rifles in hopes of getting a better shot at the gunman. Police slowly ascended the stairs towards Collins' room, shouting for him to surrender, to no response. Before officers reached his door, Collins laid down on his bed and committed suicide by shooting himself through the roof of his mouth. The shooting ended at 9:20 a.m., lasting one hour and five minutes, with twenty gunshots fired.

== Victims ==
=== Killed ===
- Edward Boyer, 40, shot in the right side of the chest
- Elery Purnsley, 56, shot in the heart
- Frederick Casino, 38, shot multiple times in the left side of the chest
- Louise Moore, 40, shot in the forehead
- James Simon, 41, shot in the left side of the neck
- Peter Parker, 40, shot in the abdomen
- Samuel Hill, 7 or 43, shot in the heart
- Samuel Lytle, 28, shot in shoulder

=== Injured ===
- Hattie Nichols, 29, shot below the right eye and temple
- Alfred J. Green, 38, shot in the right shoulder
- William Wilson, 63, shot in the left elbow and hip
- Bert Purnsley, 38, bruised forehead while fleeing
- Monroe Wyche, 57, cut hand from broken glass

== Perpetrator ==
Collins was born into an African American family in Exmore, Virginia, around 1910. Nicknamed "Bad Boy", he had a history of violence, with his family stating that Collins had "suffered periods of mental derangement" since 1940, following a head injury. While residing in nearby Hare Valley, Collins was twice convicted of malicious maiming in relation to shootings, receiving a six-year prison sentence at Virginia State Penitentiary for the second offense in 1942. After his release, Collins mostly avoided his hometown and during the few visits, he was noted for several aggravated misdemeanors, which included cutting his brother with a knife. Collins reportedly spent time traveling the Mid-Atlantic regions as a migrant worker. After the shooting, a woman in Syracuse, New York, claimed to be Collins' wife and stated that he escaped Marcy State Hospital. Collins was also wanted in Virginia by Northampton County Sheriff's Office on a felony warrant for a break-in committed four or five days before the shooting.

One week before the shooting, Collins arrived in Chester for unknown reasons and checked into a second-floor boarding room at 233 Market Street in Bethel Court, a historically Black neighborhood in the town's business district. Mike Pappas, who owned the building and the restaurant below, stated that he knew little about Collins. A neighbor described him as having a "hot temper". Collins is known to have modified his ammunition to act as dum-dum rounds in preparation for the killings.

== Aftermath ==
The motive for the shooting remains unknown. An initial rumor that it was connected to an argument over a numbers racket involving a bet of one dollar (equivalent to $13 in 2025) was rejected by police. According to the rumor, Collins' first victim was a "numbers man", who was killed either during an argument below his window or ambushed by Collins from a car. Another rumor framed the shootings as a "race riot", claiming that Collins had first killed Fred Casino and stolen his car, fatally shot Detective Purnsley while at a crossroad, and shot the remaining victims while driving through the neighborhood before making a final stand at the boarding house.

A funeral march for Elery Purnsley took place on 11 November 1948, which would have been Purnsley's 57th birthday, organized by the Improved Benevolent and Protective Order of Elks of the World and the Grand Lodge Fraternal Order of Police, of which he was a member. The funeral service was moved to a later time that day for the funeral of Samuel Hill, who was Purnsley's nephew.

A commonly repeated, but most likely invented detail about the shootings revolved around mute victim Samuel Lytle being "shocked" into speaking, supposedly telling police, "I've been shot", before dying.

On May 20, 1949, Chester Times staff reporter Orrin C. Evans won first place in a competition of the Pennsylvania Newspaper Publishers Association for his immediate account of the shooting.

The rifle used in the shooting was kept by Delaware County police until October 31, 1950, when the department destroyed it in a public display near Media, as one of 200 firearms that had been kept as evidence from various criminal cases since 1937.

Smithsonian wrote in 2015 that the Market Street Massacre was one of the earliest mass shootings in US history, preceding the more well-known 1949 "Walk of Death" in Camden, New Jersey, which is commonly described as the first mass shooting in the country.

== See also ==
- Mass shootings in the United States
