= James Brown's Dry Goods Store =

Historic commercial building in Virginia, United States

- U.S. National Register of Historic Places
- U.S. Historic district – Contributing property
- Virginia Landmarks Register
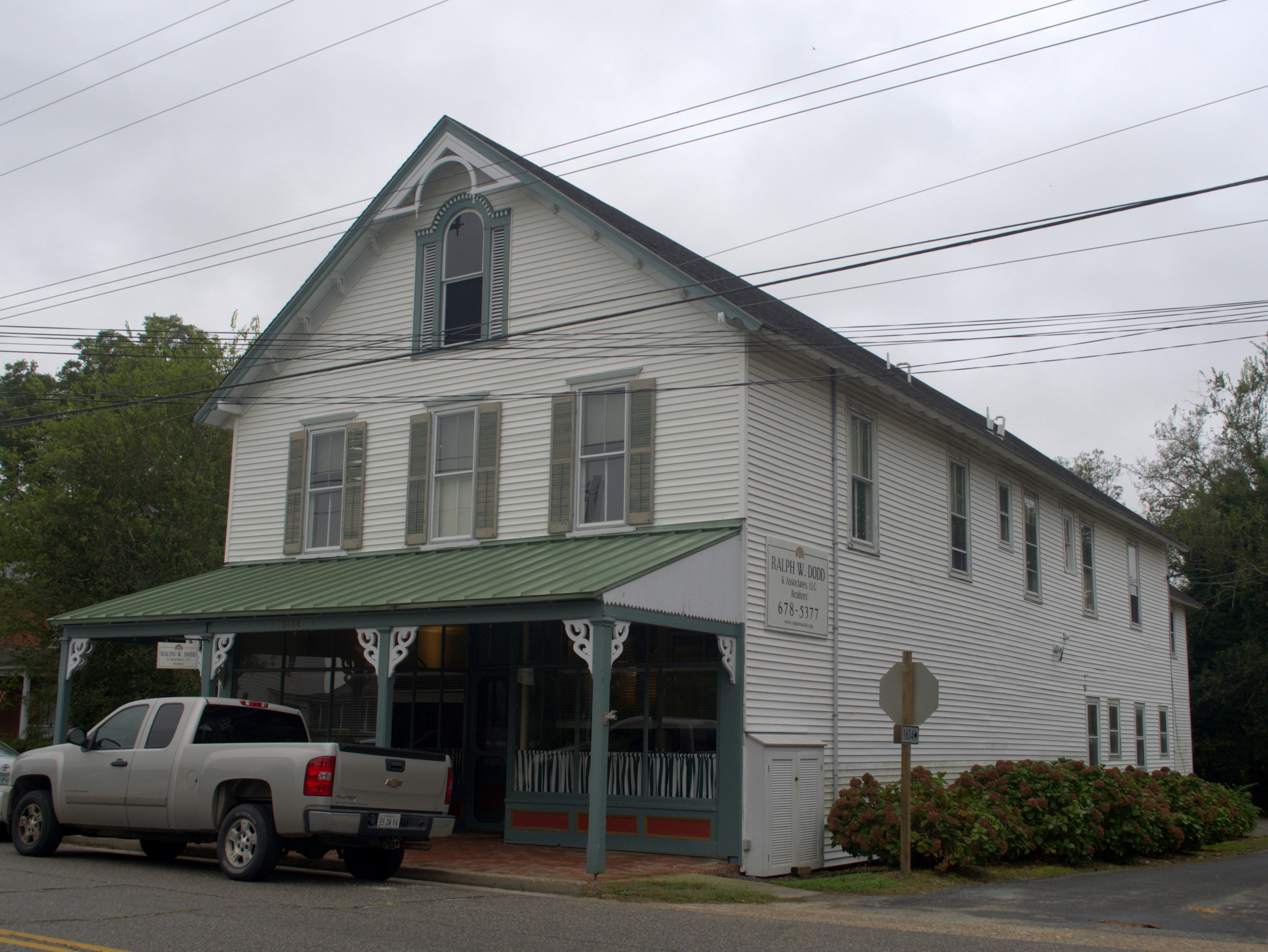
- Building in 2013

- Location within Virginia Location within the United States
- Location: 16464 Courthouse Rd., Eastville, Virginia
- Coordinates: 37°21′6″N 75°56′51″W
- Area: less than one acre
- Built: c. 1880
- Architectural style: Stick/eastlake
- NRHP reference No.: 02000321
- VLR No.: 214-0039

Significant dates
- Added to NRHP: April 1, 2002
- Designated VLR: September 12, 2001

James Brown's Dry Goods Store is a historic dry goods store located at Eastville, Northampton County, Virginia. It was built about 1880, and is a two-story, three-bay, rectangular frame commercial building located in the center of the town's historic main thoroughfare. It measures 32 feet wide by 100 feet deep. The front facade features a wide full-length porch, highly decorative molding over the transom of the display windows, and a stylized Palladian window framed with Stick / Eastlake trim.

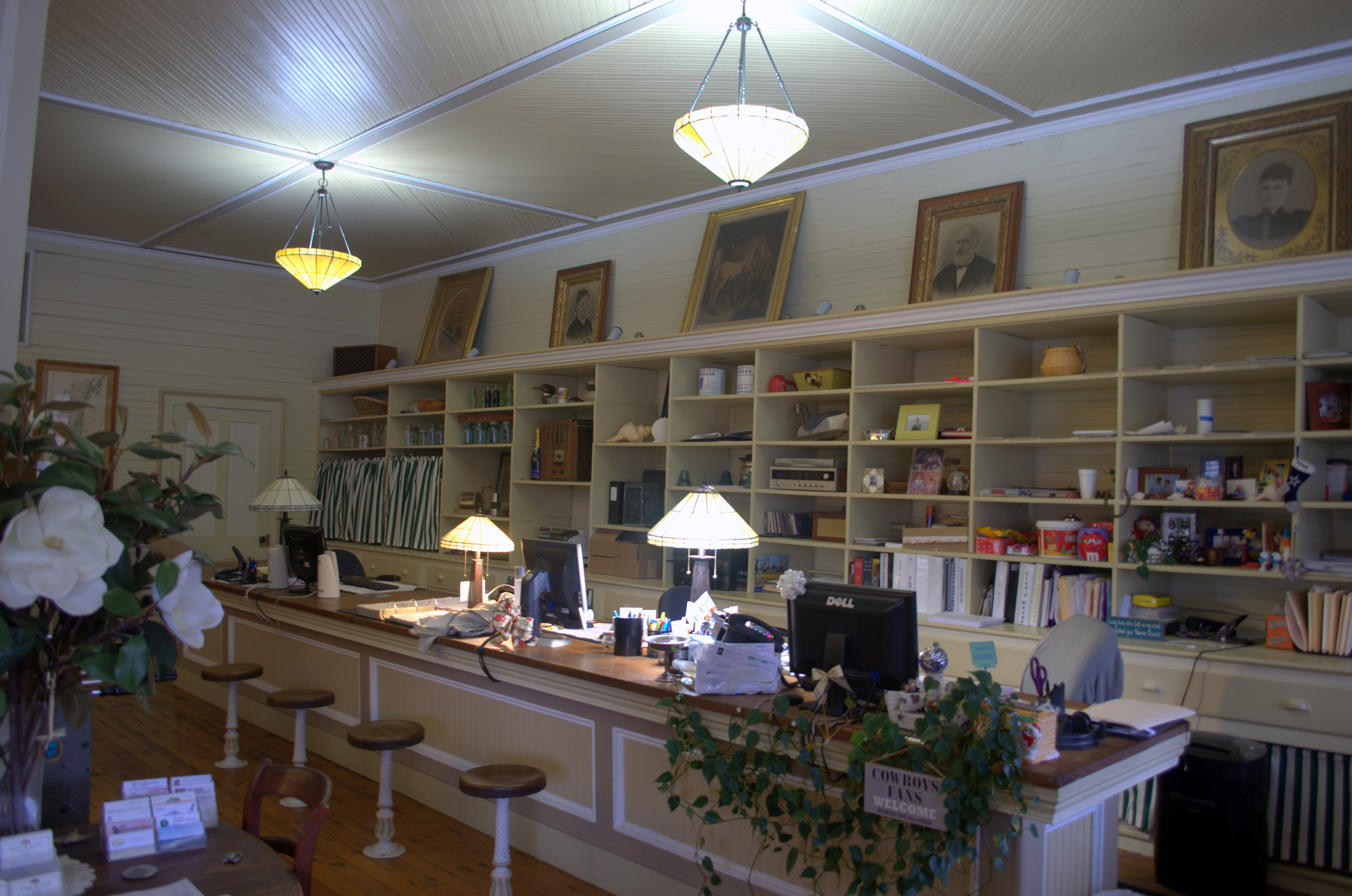
Interior of the building in 2013

It was listed on the National Register of Historic Places in 2001. It is located in the Eastville Historical District.
