= Virginia State Route 184 =

State highway in Northampton County, Virginia, US

State Route 184

Route information
- Maintained by VDOT
- Length: 3.20 mi (5.15 km)
- Existed: 1957–present

Major junctions
- West end: SR 1101 / SR 1106 in Cape Charles
- East end: US 13 / US 13 Bus. near Bayview

Location
- Country: United States
- State: Virginia
- Counties: Northampton

Highway system
- Virginia Routes; Interstate; US; Primary; Secondary; Byways; History; HOT lanes
← SR 183	→ SR 185

State Route 184 (SR 184) is a primary state highway in the U.S. state of Virginia. The state highway runs 3.20 miles (5.15 km) from Washington Avenue and Bay Street in Cape Charles east to U.S. Route 13 (US 13) and US 13 Business near Bayview. SR 184 connects US 13 with Cape Charles in southern Northampton County. The state highway is the old alignment of US 13 from when the U.S. highway used the Little Creek-Cape Charles Ferry to cross the Chesapeake Bay to Norfolk. SR 184 was designated after US 13 was extended south to the new terminal of the Little Creek Ferry at Kiptopeke and later the Chesapeake Bay Bridge-Tunnel.

== Route description ==
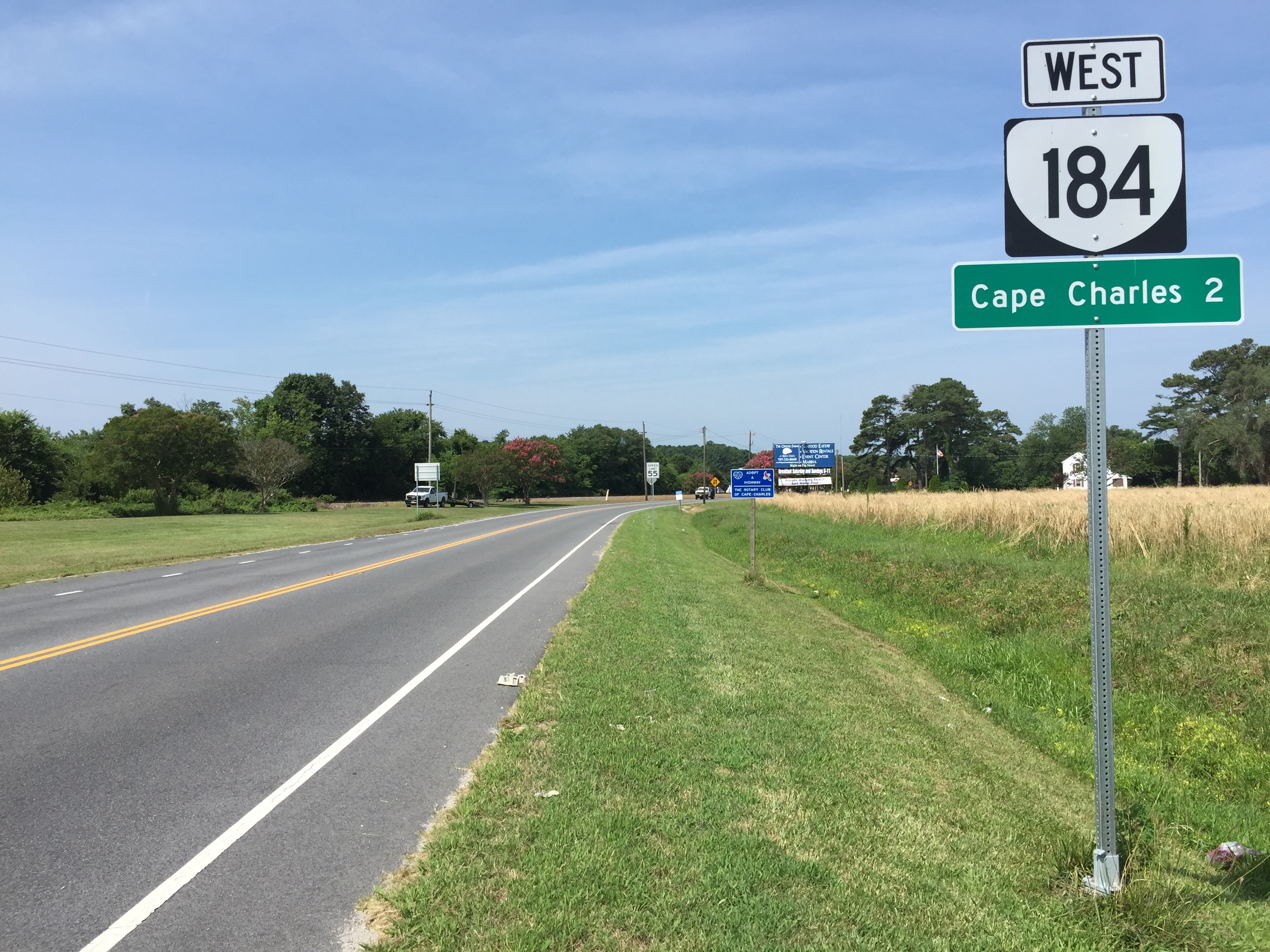
View west at the east end of SR 184 at US 13 and US 13 Bus. near Bayview

SR 184 begins at the intersection of Washington Avenue and Pine Street on the northern edge of the street grid in the town of Cape Charles. The state highway heads west as two-lane undivided Bay Avenue, immediately turning south to parallel the beach along the Chesapeake Bay. At the southern end of the beach at Cape Charles Harbor, SR 184 turns east onto Mason Avenue and passes through the downtown area, which lies to the north of the former ferry terminal where the Eastern Shore mainline of the inactive Bay Coast Railroad formerly interchanged with the rail car float that carried trains across the Chesapeake Bay to Norfolk. At the eastern edge of downtown, SR 184 turns north onto Fig Street then east again onto Randolph Avenue. The state highway parallels the inactive railroad line east as Stone Road through the hamlet of Cape Junction, where a rail line formerly spun off the main line south to Kiptopeke, to the highway's eastern terminus at US 13 (Lankford Highway). The roadway continues on the eastern side of the intersection as US 13 Business (Bayside Drive), which curves north through the community of Bayside and the town of Cheriton.

== Major intersections ==
The entire route is in Northampton County.

Location	mi	km	Destinations	Notes
Cape Charles	0.00	0.00	SR 1101 south (Pine Street) / SR 1106 east (Washington Avenue)	Western terminus
Bayview	3.20	5.15	US 13 (Lankford Highway) / US 13 Bus. north (Bayside Drive) – Eastville, Norfolk, Cheriton	Eastern terminus
1.000 mi = 1.609 km; 1.000 km = 0.621 mi
