= Beverly, Virginia =

Beverly may refer to:

- Beverly, King and Queen County, Virginia
- Beverly, Northampton County, Virginia
- Beverly, West Virginia, once part of Virginia
