= Cedar Grove, Virginia =

Cedar Grove, Virginia may refer to:

- Cedar Grove, Brunswick County, Virginia
- Cedar Grove, Frederick County, Virginia
- Cedar Grove, Northampton County, Virginia
- Cedar Grove, Rockbridge County, Virginia
