= Eastville Mercantile =

Historic commercial building in Virginia, United States

- U.S. National Register of Historic Places
- U.S. Historic district – Contributing property
- Virginia Landmarks Register
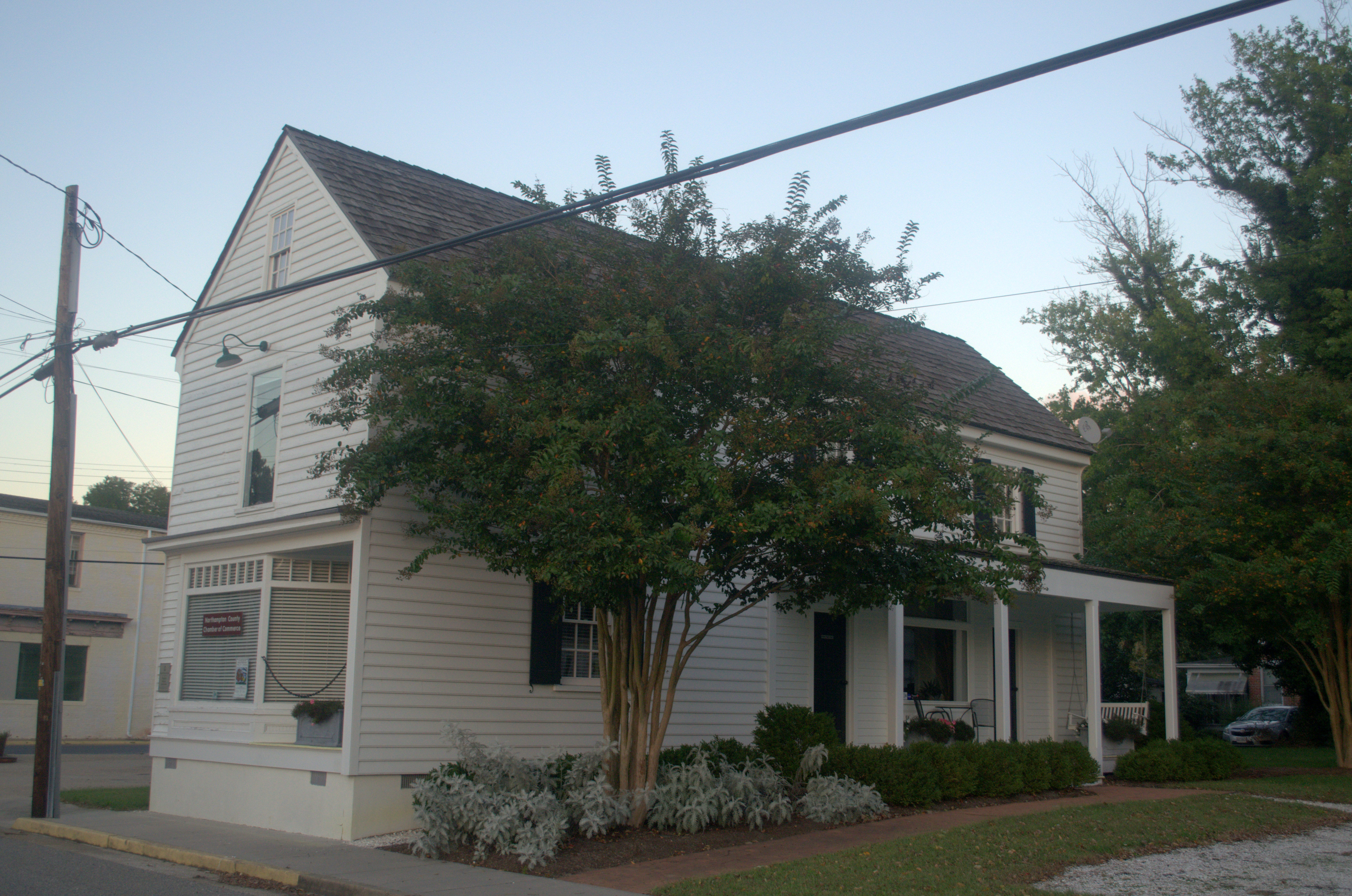
- Building in 2013

- Location within Virginia Location within the United States
- Location: 16429 Courthouse Rd., Eastville, Virginia
- Coordinates: 37°21′16″N 75°56′46″W
- Area: 1.1 acres (0.45 ha)
- Built: c. 1850
- Built by: Lyons, James
- Architectural style: Mid 19th Century vernacular
- NRHP reference No.: 04001540
- VLR No.: 214-5001

Significant dates
- Added to NRHP: January 20, 2005
- Designated VLR: December 1, 2004

Eastville Mercantile, also known as Eastville Drugstore, is a historic commercial building located at Eastville, Northampton County, Virginia. It was built about 1850, and is a two-story, rectangular frame building located in the center of the town's historic main thoroughfare. It measures 18 feet wide by 50 feet deep and has a front gable roof with unadorned bargeboard. It is in the form of a traditional Chesapeake store. The first floor contains a large rectangular sales room and a small counting room, while the second floor contains a storage room and an apartment.

It was listed on the National Register of Historic Places in 2005. It is located in the Eastville Historical District.
