= Northampton County Courthouse Historic District =

Historic district in Virginia, United States

- U.S. National Register of Historic Places
- U.S. Historic district
- Virginia Landmarks Register
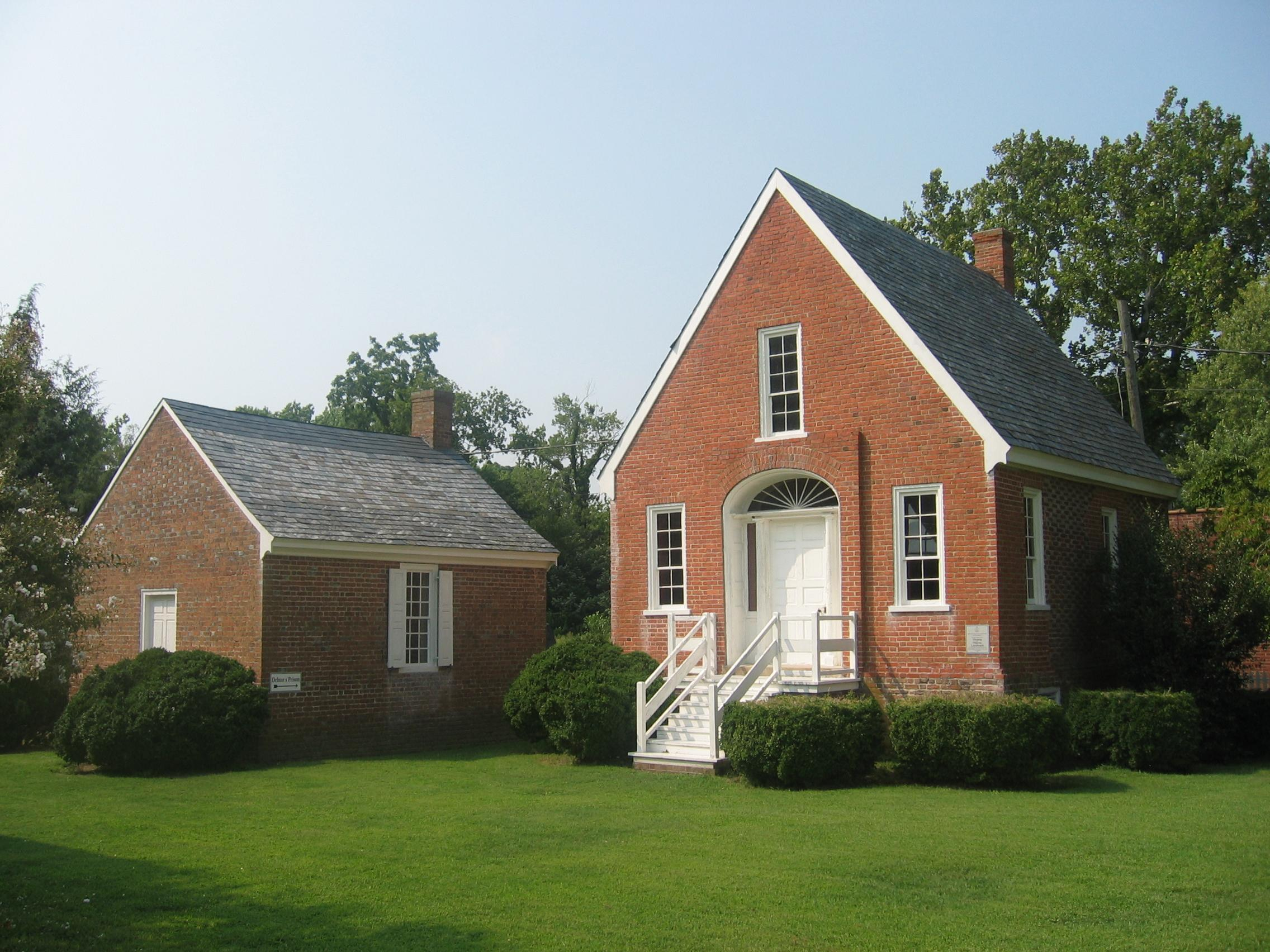
- Eastville Courthouse Buildings

- Location within Virginia Location within the United States
- Location: Eastville, Virginia, U.S.
- Coordinates: 37°21′10″N 75°56′48″W
- Area: 9 acres (3.6 ha)
- Architect: John Marshall and William Satchell
- Architectural style: Romanesque and Federal
- NRHP reference No.: 72001410
- VLR No.: 214-0007

Significant dates
- Added to NRHP: April 13, 1972
- Designated VLR: November 16, 1971

The Northampton County Courthouse Historic District is a nine-acre historic district in Northampton County, Virginia, United States. The district is listed on the National Register of Historic Places. Three buildings are located on the property: A courthouse and a clerk's office (both dating to 1731), and a prison (dating to 1814). The buildings house documents dating back to 1632. It is included in the Eastville Historic District.

== History ==
The courthouse was constructed by a John Marshall, in 1731 at the cost of 50,000 pounds of tobacco. Built in Flemish bond style, the brick building measured approximately 35 feet by 23 feet. The Clerk's Office was built adjacent to the courthouse. It features diagonally-battened door fastens and an unusual assortment of variously sized paving stones.

The building remained in use through 1795, when another courthouse was constructed nearby. It was then turned into a storehouse for a rent of $1 per year, on the condition that the new lessee would fund a new roof for the building.

== Preservation ==
The court house remained in the possession of the original lessee and his descendants until it was purchased by the county in 1913 for $4,000. Preservation Virginia had the building moved to its current location, near the Clerk's Office. Using funds from the County of Northampton, the local Preservation Virginia Branch, and a grant from the parent Preservation Virginia, the 1731 Courthouse, Clerk's Office, and the Debtor's Prison underwent extensive repair in the 1950s.

The buildings are owned by the County of Northampton, Virginia. The Northampton Historic Preservation Society (formerly the Northampton Branch of Preservation Virginia) works as an advocate with County Supervisors and personnel to maintain the preservation of the entire Eastville Court Green and its buildings. The courthouse includes a museum, which along with the three buildings is open daily during regular business hours from April through October.

The Eastville Court Green is listed on the National Register of Historic Places (2009) and the Virginia Landmarks Register (2009).
