= Fairview, Virginia =

Fairview, Virginia may refer to:

- Fairview, Essex County, Virginia
- Fairview, Fairfax, Virginia
- Fairview, Fairfax County, Virginia
- Fairview, Mecklenburg County, Virginia
- Fairview, Northampton County, Virginia
- Fairview, Page County, Virginia
- Fairview, Scott County, Virginia
- Fairview, Wythe County, Virginia
