= Cape Charles Historic District =

Historic district in Virginia, United States

- U.S. National Register of Historic Places
- U.S. Historic district
- Virginia Landmarks Register
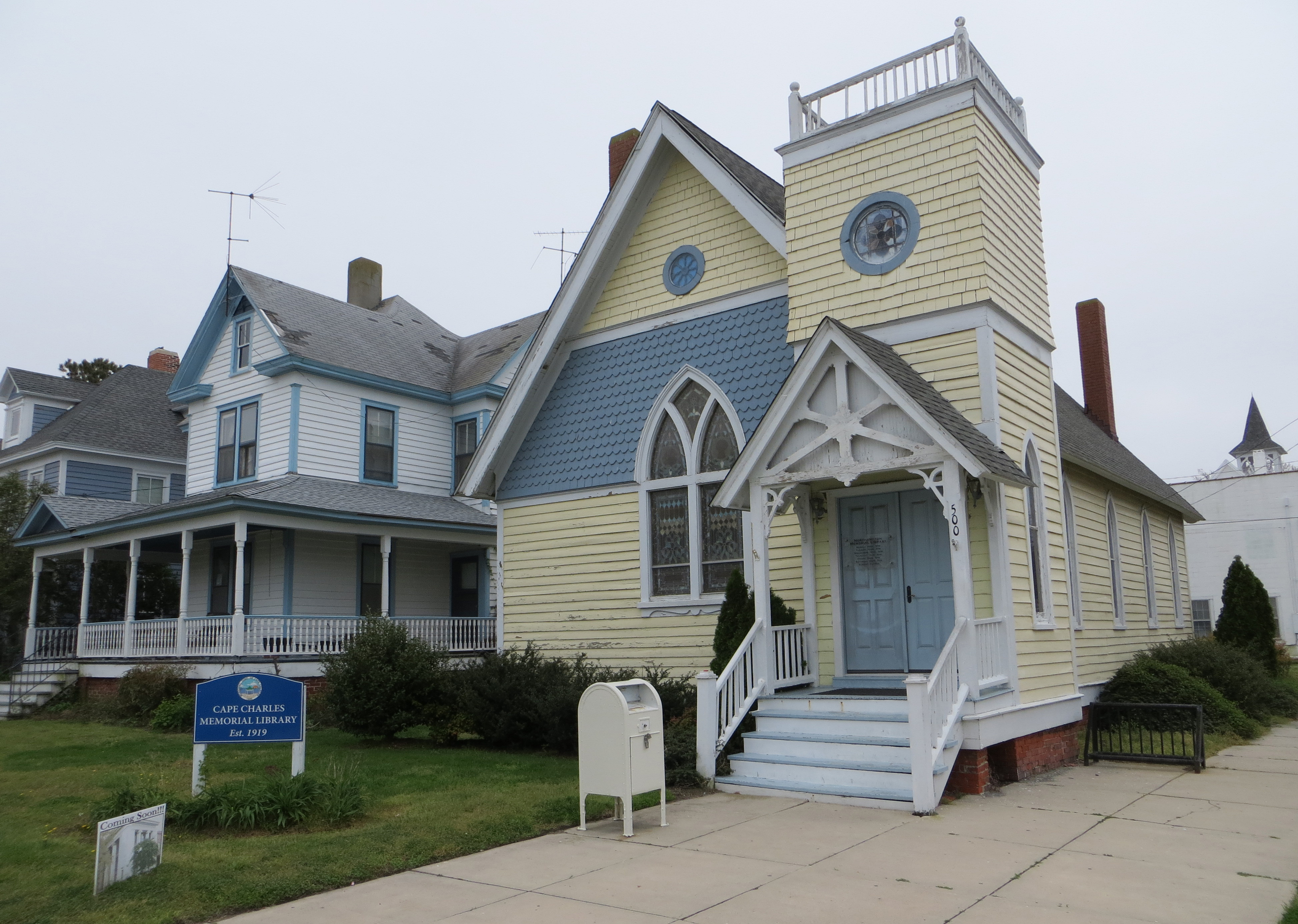
- Cape Charles Memorial Library, April 2013

- Location within Virginia Location within the United States
- Location: Roughly bounded by Washington, Bay and Mason Aves. and Fig St., Cape Charles, Virginia
- Coordinates: 37°16′11″N 76°00′59″W
- Area: 152 acres (62 ha)
- Built: 1883
- Architect: Multiple
- Architectural style: Late 19th And 20th Century Revivals, Bungalow/craftsman, Late Victorian
- NRHP reference No.: 90002122
- VLR No.: 182-0002

Significant dates
- Added to NRHP: January 3, 1991
- Designated VLR: August 15, 1989

Cape Charles Historic District is a national historic district located at Cape Charles, Northampton County, Virginia. The Town was surveyed by the Virginia Department of Historic Resources in 1989, and a National Register Historic District was created and listed on the National Register of Historic Places.

== History ==
Pennsylvania politician, businessman and horse aficionado William Lawrence Scott caused Pocomoke City, Maryland, engineer Robert Bauman to lay out a town at the southern terminus of his New York, Philadelphia and Norfolk Railroad, which was constructed in the 1880s and allowed agricultural produce and goods from the Delmarva Peninsula to be shipped across the Chesapeake Bay much more economically than previously. The town grew as the railroad brought passengers and freight, but stagnated after World War II and especially after passenger rail service ended in 1958. Ferry service also ended about three decades ago.

== Buildings and structures ==
The district encompasses 526 contributing buildings and 3 contributing structures in the town of Cape Charles. The buildings relate to the town's development as a harbor and railroad town in the late-19th and early-20th century. Notable buildings include the Seafood Headquarters (c. 1886), McCrory's Store annex (c. 1900), Mitchell House (1884), Jack Moore House (c. 1910), A. L. Detwiler House (1919), Kellogg House (1924), Mumford Bank (c. 1895), Parsons Building, Watson's Hardware, Mack Building, Palace Theatre, Municipal Building, St. Stephen's African Methodist Episcopal Church (1885, 1912), St. Charles Roman Catholic Church (1889), Trinity United Methodist Church (1893), the former Presbyterian church (1902, Cape Charles Memorial Library), First Presbyterian Church (1926), and U.S. Post Office (1932).

The oldest house now in Cape Charles is a dwelling just east of the Municipal building on Mason Avenue, built late in the fall of 1883. It was built on the railroad property, but later moved across the street to its present site at 515 Mason Ave. (1883)

It was listed on the National Register of Historic Places in 1991.
