= Stratton Manor =

Historic house in Virginia, United States

- U.S. National Register of Historic Places
- Virginia Landmarks Register
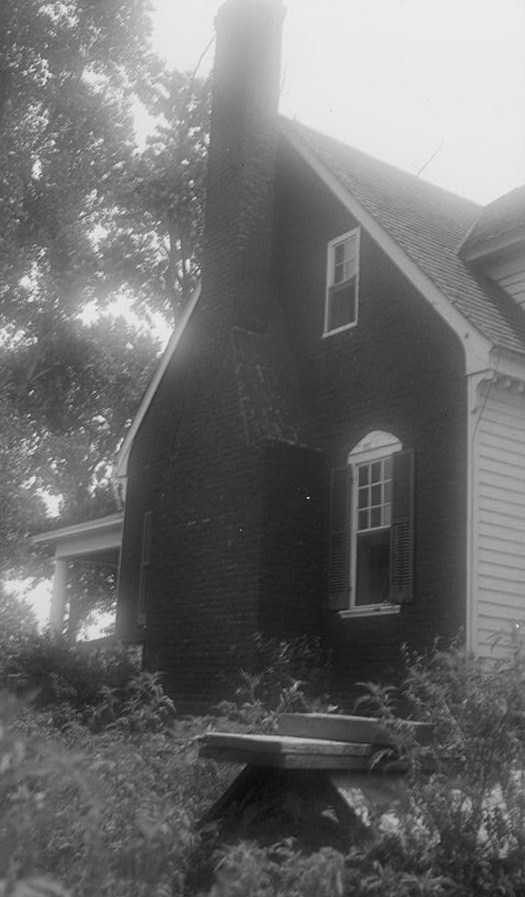
- Stratton Manor, HABS Photo

- Location within Virginia Location within the United States
- Location: Southeast of Cape Charles off VA 642, near Cape Charles, Virginia
- Coordinates: 37°15′43″N 75°59′02″W
- Area: 15 acres (6.1 ha)
- Architectural style: Vernacular
- NRHP reference No.: 80004206
- VLR No.: 065-0024

Significant dates
- Added to NRHP: November 28, 1980
- Designated VLR: September 16, 1980

Stratton Manor is a historic plantation house located near Cape Charles, Northampton County, Virginia. It was built in the third quarter of the 18th century, and is a 1 1/2-story, single-pile, gable roof house with a wood-frame core of three bays with brick ends. A two-story ell was added in the first quarter of the 20th century. It is a characteristic example of the 18th-century vernacular architecture distinctive of Virginia's Eastern Shore.

The house has the name of Benjamin Stratton, the original owner of the site. Stratton Manor was listed on the National Register of Historic Places in 1980.
