= Cessford =

Cessford may refer to:

- Cessford, Alberta, a hamlet in Alberta, Canada
- Cessford, Scottish Borders, a hamlet in Scotland
- Cessford (Eastville, Virginia), a historic house in the United States
