= Middletown, Northampton County, Virginia =

Unincorporated community in Northampton County, Virginia, United States

Coordinates: 37°29′02″N 75°52′03″W

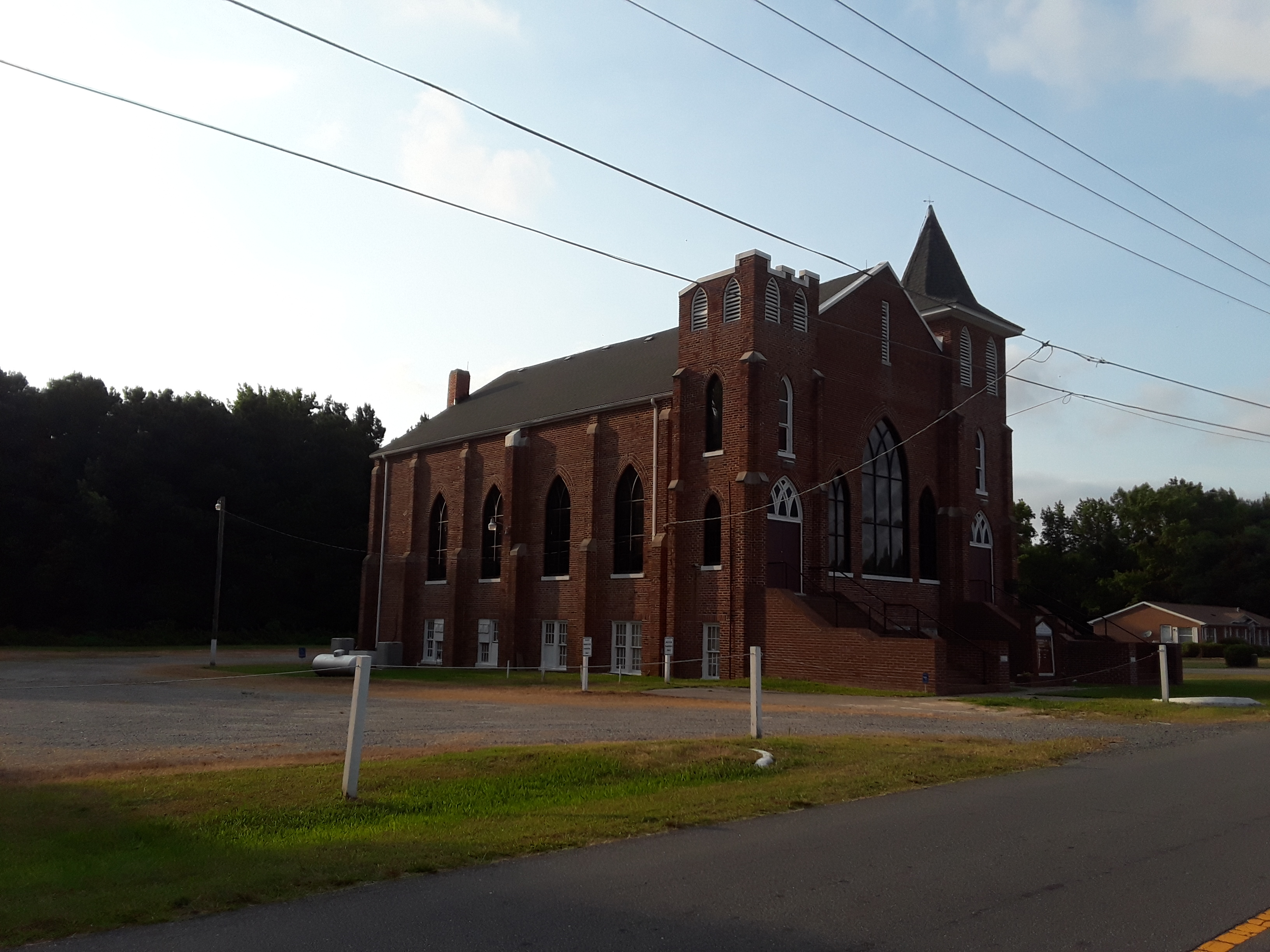
New Allen Memorial African Methodist Episcopal Church in Middletown, July 2018

Middletown is an unincorporated community in Northampton County, Virginia, United States.
