= Nottingham, Virginia =

Unincorporated community in Virginia, US

Coordinates: 37°20′42.4″N 75°56′56.7″W

Nottingham is an unincorporated community in Northampton County, Virginia, United States.
