= Culls, Virginia =

Unincorporated community in Virginia, US

Coordinates: 37°16′41″N 75°57′23″W

Culls is an unincorporated community in Northampton County, Virginia, United States.
