= Shadyside, Virginia =

Unincorporated community in Virginia, US

Coordinates: 37°23′52″N 75°54′44″W

Shadyside is an unincorporated community in Northampton County, Virginia, United States.
