= Bacon Hill, Virginia =

Unincorporated community in Virginia, US

Coordinates: 37°31′42″N 75°49′04″W

Bacon Hill is an unincorporated community in Northampton County, Virginia, United States.
