= Johnson Cove, Virginia =

Unincorporated community in Virginia, US

Coordinates: 37°32′48″N 75°55′34″W

Johnson Cove is an unincorporated community in Northampton County, Virginia, United States.
