= Stumptown, Northampton County, Virginia =

Unincorporated community in Northampton County, Virginia

Coordinates: 37°20′25″N 75°56′48″W

Stumptown is an unincorporated community in Northampton County, Virginia, United States.
