= Little Johnsontown, Virginia =

Unincorporated community in Virginia, US

Coordinates: 37°26′00″N 75°51′21″W

Little Johnsontown is an unincorporated community in Northampton County, Virginia, United States.
