= Pat Town, Virginia =

Unincorporated community in Virginia, US

Coordinates: 37°17′54″N 75°57′00″W

Pat Town is an unincorporated community in Northampton County, Virginia, United States.
