= The Meadows, Virginia =

Unincorporated community in Virginia, US

Coordinates: 37°19′52″N 75°57′00″W

The Meadows is an unincorporated community in Northampton County, Virginia, United States.
