= R. F. Bayford =

English barrister (1871–1951)

R. F. Bayford OBE KC

Recorder of Portsmouth
- In office 1929–1944

Personal details
- Born: Robert Frederic Bayford; 24 September 1871 Westminster, London, England
- Died: 5 June 1951 (aged 79)
- Occupation: Barrister

Robert Frederic Bayford OBE KC (24 September 1871 – 5 June 1951) was an English barrister.

Bayford was born in Westminster, London, the eldest son of Robert Augustus Bayford, also an eminent barrister. He was educated at Eton College and Trinity Hall, Cambridge, rowing in the 1893 University Boat Race and graduating in 1895. He was called to the Bar by the Inner Temple the same year and specialised in probate and divorce cases, as his father had also done. He took silk in 1919 and became a Bencher in 1925. From 1929 to 1944 he was Recorder of Portsmouth and from 1938 to 1947 he was deputy chairman of the Hampshire Quarter Sessions.

During the First World War he served as a Divisional Commander with the Metropolitan Special Constabulary, and for this he was appointed Officer of the Order of the British Empire (OBE) in the 1920 civilian war honours. He also received the Special Constabulary Long Service Medal with The Great War 1914–1918 clasp.
