= Woodstock, Northampton County, Virginia =

Unincorporated community in Virginia, US

Coordinates: 37°28′34″N 75°50′51″W

Woodstock is an unincorporated community in Northampton County, Virginia, United States.
