= Treherneville, Virginia =

Unincorporated community in Virginia, US

Coordinates: 37°25′37″N 75°53′25″W

Treherneville is an unincorporated community in Northampton County, Virginia, United States.
