= Red Bank, Northampton County, Virginia =

Unincorporated community in Virginia, US

Coordinates: 37°26′40.49″N 75°50′30.75″W

Red Bank is an unincorporated community in Northampton County, Virginia, United States.
