= Oakland Park, Virginia =

Unincorporated community in Virginia, US

Coordinates: 37°30′38″N 75°49′17″W

Oakland Park is an unincorporated community in Northampton County, Virginia, United States.
