= Sheps End, Virginia =

Unincorporated community in Virginia, US

Coordinates: 37°26′05″N 75°52′06″W

Sheps End is an unincorporated community in Northampton County, Virginia, United States.
