= Little Salisbury, Virginia =

Unincorporated community in Virginia, US

Coordinates: 37°19′14″N 75°56′06″W

Little Salisbury is an unincorporated community in Northampton County, Virginia, United States.
