= Seaview, Virginia =

Unincorporated community in Virginia, US

Coordinates: 37°15′43″N 75°56′45″W

Seaview is an unincorporated community in Northampton County, Virginia, United States.
