= Cessford (Eastville, Virginia) =

Historic house in Virginia, United States

- U.S. National Register of Historic Places
- U.S. Historic district – Contributing property
- Virginia Landmarks Register
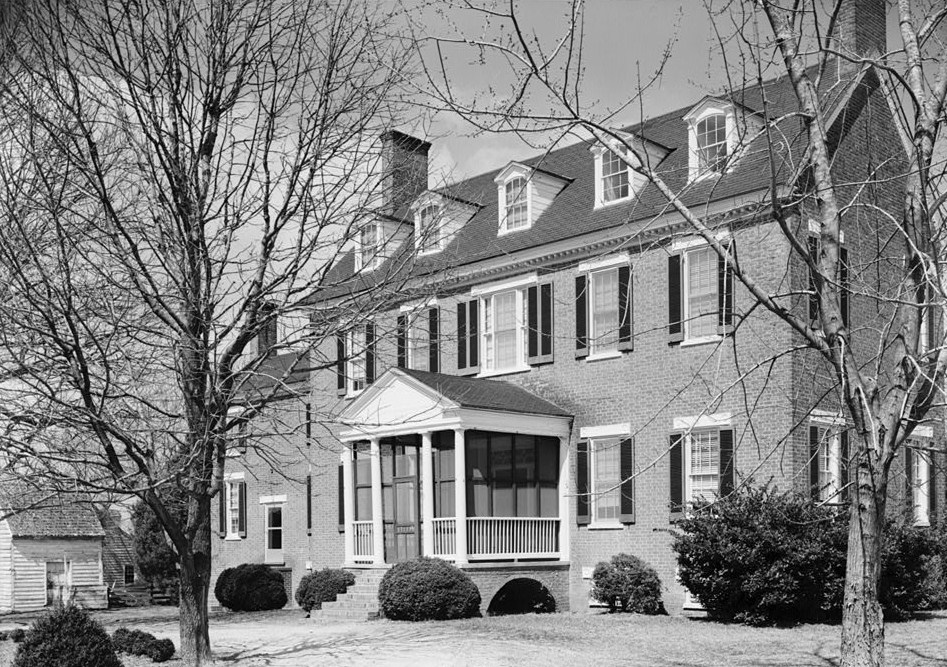
- Cessford, HABS Photo

- Location within Virginia Location within the United States
- Location: 16546 Courthouse Rd., Eastville, Virginia
- Coordinates: 37°20′59″N 75°56′54″W
- Area: 5 acres (2.0 ha)
- Built: c. 1801
- Architectural style: Federal
- NRHP reference No.: 03001441
- VLR No.: 214-0001

Significant dates
- Added to NRHP: January 16, 2004
- Designated VLR: September 10, 2003

Cessford is a historic plantation house located at Eastville, Northampton County, Virginia. It was built about 1801, and is a 2 1/2-story, Federal style brick dwelling with a later two-story brick addition. It has a slate covered gable roof and features central pedimented porches on the north and south facades. Also on the property are a contributing smokehouse, quarter kitchen, a utility building, and the original pattern of a garden. During the American Civil War, Brigadier General Henry Hayes Lockwood on July 23, 1862, commandeered the property for his headquarters and remained in residence of the property throughout the war.

The house was named after Cessford, in Scotland, the ancestral home of an early settler.

It was listed on the National Register of Historic Places in 2004. It is located in the Eastville Historical District.
