= Dalbys, Virginia =

Unincorporated community in Virginia, US

Coordinates: 37°13′49″N 75°58′13″W

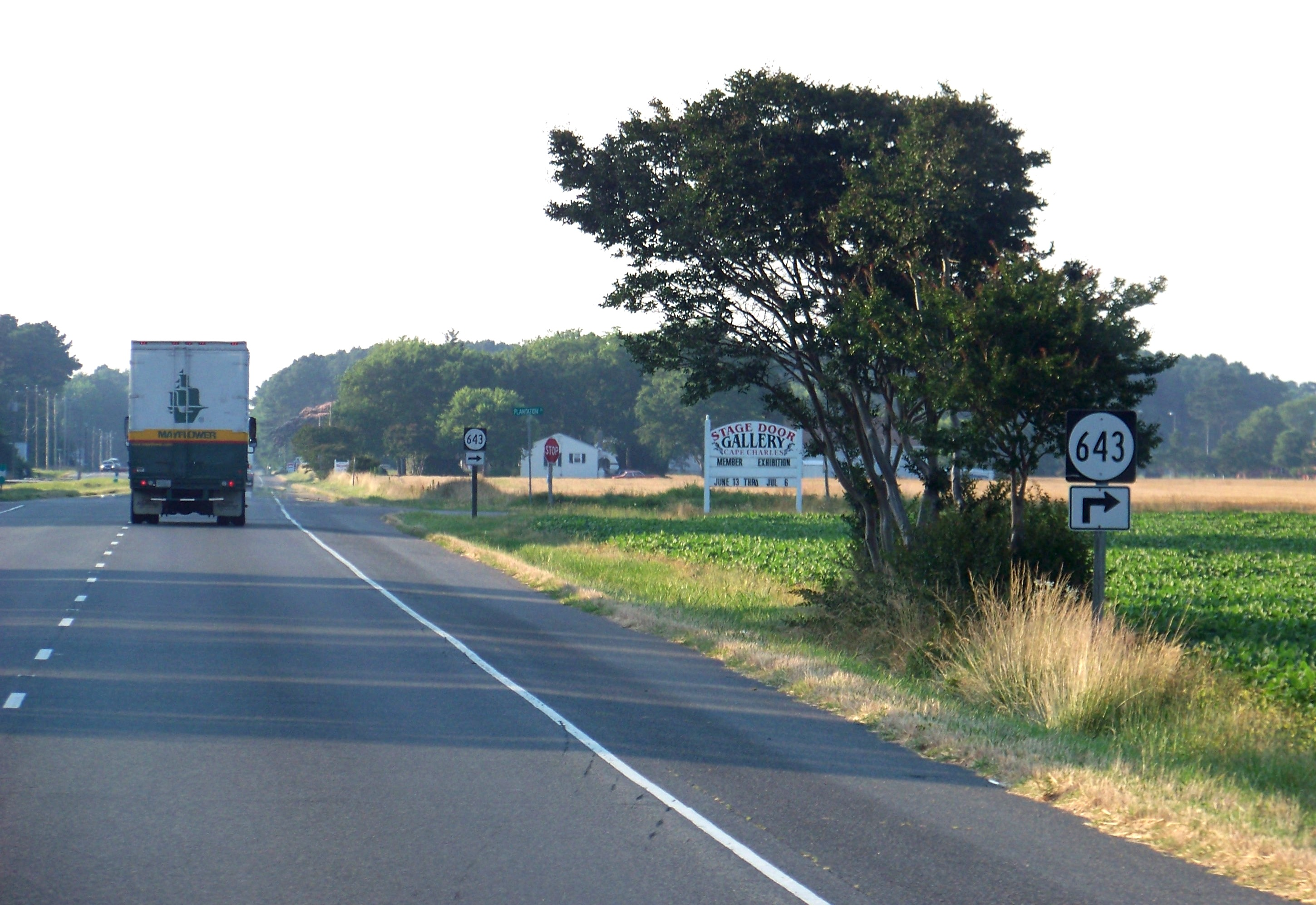
Landscape outside Dalbys

Dalbys is an unincorporated community in Northampton County, Virginia, United States.
