= Simpkins, Virginia =

Unincorporated community in Virginia, US

Coordinates: 37°19′27″N 75°56′37″W

Simpkins is an unincorporated community in Northampton County, Virginia, United States.
