= Bay Ridge, Virginia =

Unincorporated community in Virginia, US

Bay Ridge
- Unincorporated community
- Location within the Commonwealth of Virginia
- Coordinates: 37.2112508°N 76.0102107°W
- Country: United States
- State: Virginia
- County: Northampton

Bay Ridge is an unincorporated community in Northampton County, Virginia, United States.
