= Bayview, Virginia =

Unincorporated community in Virginia, US

Coordinates: 37°16′36″N 75°58′3″W

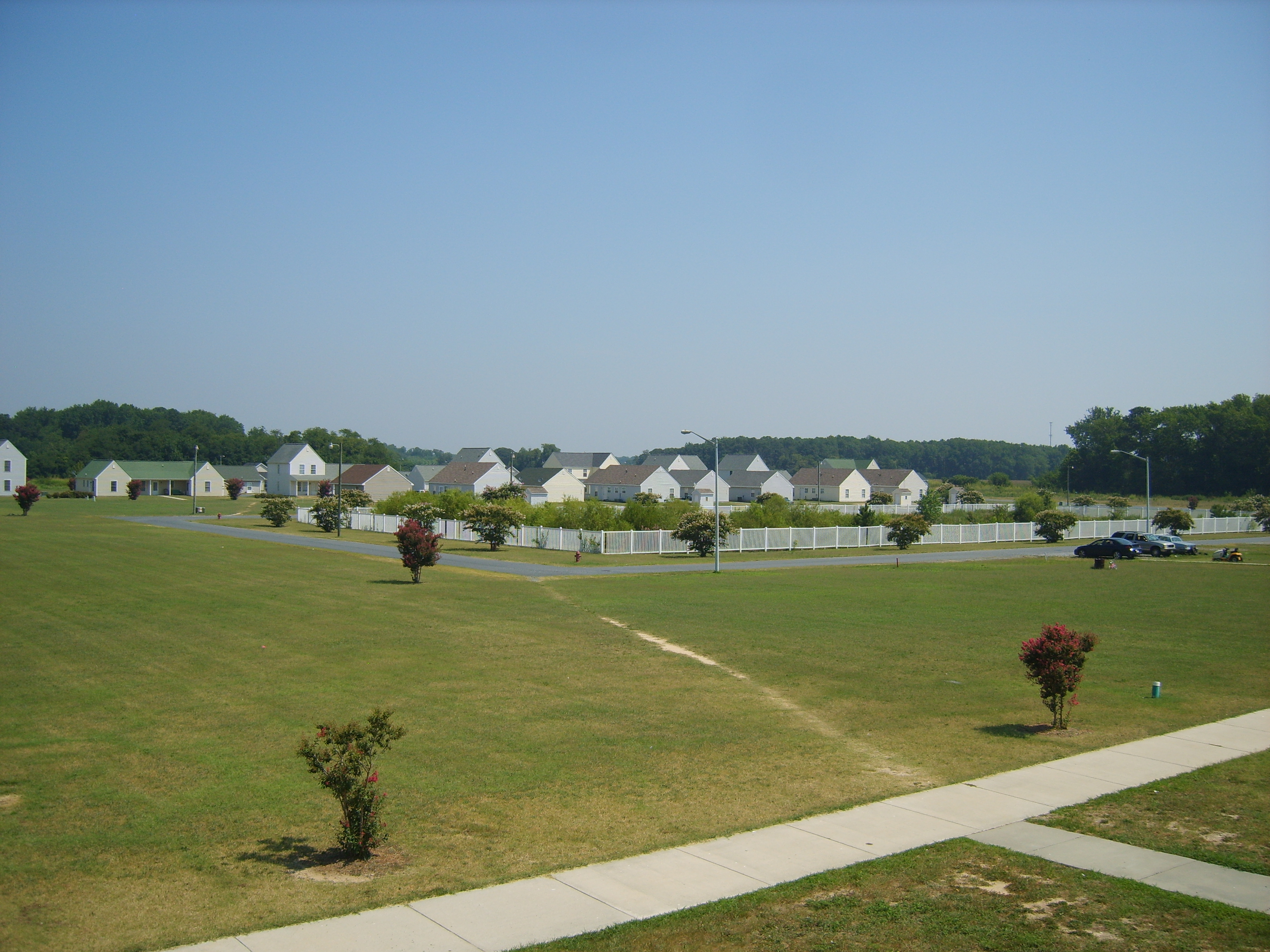
One side of the Bayview Community

Bayview is an unincorporated community in Northampton County, Virginia, United States.

== History ==
Bayview is an over-300-year-old predominantly African American community located on the Eastern Shore of Virginia. After the American Civil War, it became a community populated by formerly enslaved people, principally consisting of farms and a small village with shops, restaurants, and its own post office. In the 20th century, Bayview thrived due to agriculture, by growing white potatoes and establishing the local seafood industry. In the late 20th century, Bayview was hit hard when many of the canneries and seafood processing plants closed due to dwindling shellfish populations in the Chesapeake Bay as a result of increased pollution.

In 1998, the community organized the Bayview Citizens for Social Justice and began forming productive partnerships, including the Nature Conservancy, to improve the standard of living for its people. Through a combination of federal, state, and private funds, the community raised $11 million and purchased 160 acres of farmland, including the proposed site for the prison. In the first phase, they built 48 one, two, and three-bedroom apartments, 22 single-family homes, a laundry facility, a Community Enrichment Center, and several other facilities.

== Demographics ==
Bayview is composed of approximately 200 people, 125 of whom are over the age of 18. The community is predominantly African American, but in recent years there has been an increasing number of White and Hispanic people.

No male has graduated or even attended college, and only 7 out of 125 adults have earned a college degree. Less than half (49.6%) have received a high school degree.

Yearly income for a Bayview family ranges from under $10,000 to $40,000. 83% of the population makes less than $10,000 annually, which is below the United States' poverty line. In September 2012, no individual made over $40,000 per year.
