= Hare Valley, Virginia =

Human settlement in Virginia, United States

Hare Valley
- Unincorporated community
- Interactive map of Hare Valley
- Coordinates: 37°29′42.28″N 75°51′32.75″W
- Country: United States
- State: Virginia
- County: Northampton
- Time zone: EST (UTC−05:00)
  - Summer (DST): EDT (UTC−04:00)

Hare Valley is an unincorporated community in Northampton County on the Eastern Shore of the U.S. state of Virginia. Monroe Work documented it among African American towns and settlements in his publications.
