= Cedar Grove, Northampton County, Virginia =

Unincorporated community in Virginia, US

Coordinates: 37°10′24″N 75°57′53″W

Cedar Grove is an unincorporated community in Northampton County, Virginia, United States.
