= Beverly, Northampton County, Virginia =

Unincorporated community in Virginia, US

Coordinates: 37°18′10″N 75°56′00″W

Beverly is an unincorporated community in Northampton County, Virginia, United States.
