= Beverly, King and Queen County, Virginia =

Unincorporated community in Virginia, United States

Beverly, Virginia
- Unincorporated community
- Location in Virginia, United States Beverly (the United States)
- Coordinates: 37°57′8″N 77°10′46″W
- Country: United States
- State: Virginia
- County: King and Queen County

Beverly is an unincorporated community in King and Queen County, Virginia, United States.
