= Cedar Grove, Brunswick County, Virginia =

Unincorporated community in Virginia, United States

Coordinates: 36°36′14″N 78°00′39″W

Cedar Grove, Brunswick County is an unincorporated community located in Brunswick County, in the U.S. state of Virginia.
