= Dick Bayford =

Australian rules footballer

Personal information
- Full name: Richard Edward Gordon Bayford
- Born: 10 May 1885; South Yarra, Victoria
- Died: 14 August 1939 (aged 54); East Melbourne, Victoria
- Original team: South Yarra
- Position: Ruck

Playing career^{1}
Years	Club	Games (Goals)
1910	Essendon	5 (2)
- ^{1} Playing statistics correct to the end of 1910.

Richard Edward Gordon Bayford (10 May 1885 – 14 August 1939) was an Australian rules footballer who played with Essendon in the Victorian Football League (VFL).
