= Cape Charles, Virginia =

- Town
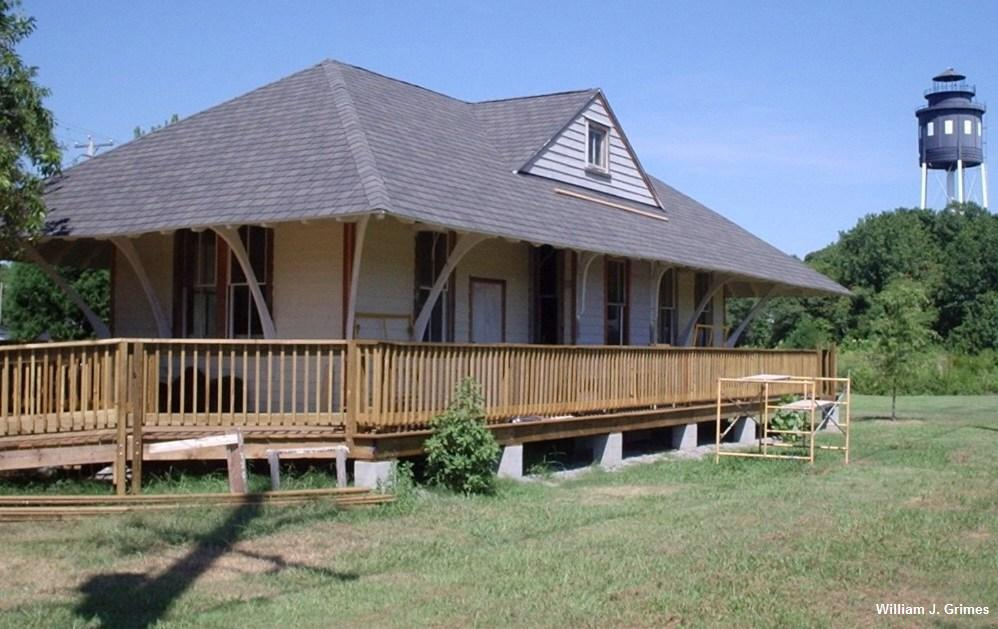
- Bloxom Depot and the town water tower

- Flag Seal

- Location in Northampton County and the Commonwealth of Virginia
- Coordinates: 37°16′3″N 76°0′51″W
- Country: United States
- State: Commonwealth of Virginia
- County: Northampton
- Established as "Municipal Corporation of Cape Charles": 1884

Government
  - Mayor: Adam Charney
  - Vice-Mayor: Steve Bennett

Area
  - Total: 3.61 sq mi (9.36 km^{2})
  - Land: 3.55 sq mi (9.20 km^{2})
  - Water: 0.062 sq mi (0.16 km^{2})
- Elevation: 3 ft (0.91 m)

Population (2020)
  - Total: 1,178
  - Estimate (2019): 1,019
  - Density: 286.8/sq mi (110.73/km^{2})
- Time zone: UTC−5 (Eastern Standard Time (EST))
  - Summer (DST): UTC−4 (EDT)
- ZIP Code (U.S. Postal Service): 23310
- Area codes: 757, 948
- FIPS code: 51-12808
- GNIS feature ID: 1492707
- Website: capecharles.org

Cape Charles is a town/municipal corporation in Northampton County, Virginia, United States. The population was 1,178 as of the 2020 Census.

== History ==
Cape Charles, located close to the mouth of the Chesapeake Bay, on Virginia's Eastern Shore, was founded in 1884 at a place formerly known as "Cherrystone Harbor" as a planned community by railroad and ferry interests. In 1883, William Lawrence Scott became president of the New York, Philadelphia and Norfolk Railroad Company (NYP&N), and purchased three plantations, including "Old Plantation Neck", comprising approximately 2,509 acres from the heirs of former Virginia Governor Littleton Waller Tazewell. Of this land, he ceded 40 acres to the NYP&N, and 136 acres to create the Town of Cape Charles (technically known as the "Municipal Corporation of Cape Charles") named Cape Charles for the geographical cape found on the Point and headland to the south. In that same year, construction of the railroad began. In Cape Charles, the Railroad Company built a harbor port to handle steamships and freighters from Cape Charles to Norfolk.

The original Town was surveyed, platted, and laid out with approximately 136 acres divided into 644 equal lots. Seven wider avenues which run from east to west were named for Virginia statesmen and political leaders; the streets which run north and south were named for fruits. The original layout of the Town is still very visible today, and was inspired by the layout of Erie, Pennsylvania, a city in which Scott was formerly mayor.

Historian William G. Thomas writes, "At a cost of nearly $300,000, the New York, Pennsylvania, and Norfolk Railroad (N.Y.P. & N. R.R.) was dredging a new harbor out of a large fresh-water lagoon between King's and Old Plantation creeks in lower Northampton County, and Scott planned to develop a new town around it called Cape Charles City. The appellation "City" for any place on the Eastern Shore was romantic, a vision of the future that the railroad might make possible....In 1890, the United States Army Corps of Engineers dredged the harbor basin, its entrance, and a channel through Cherrystone Inlet and built stone jetties protecting the harbor outlet. By 1912 the Engineer Corps estimated that Cape Charles harbor handled 2,500,000 tons of freight a year."

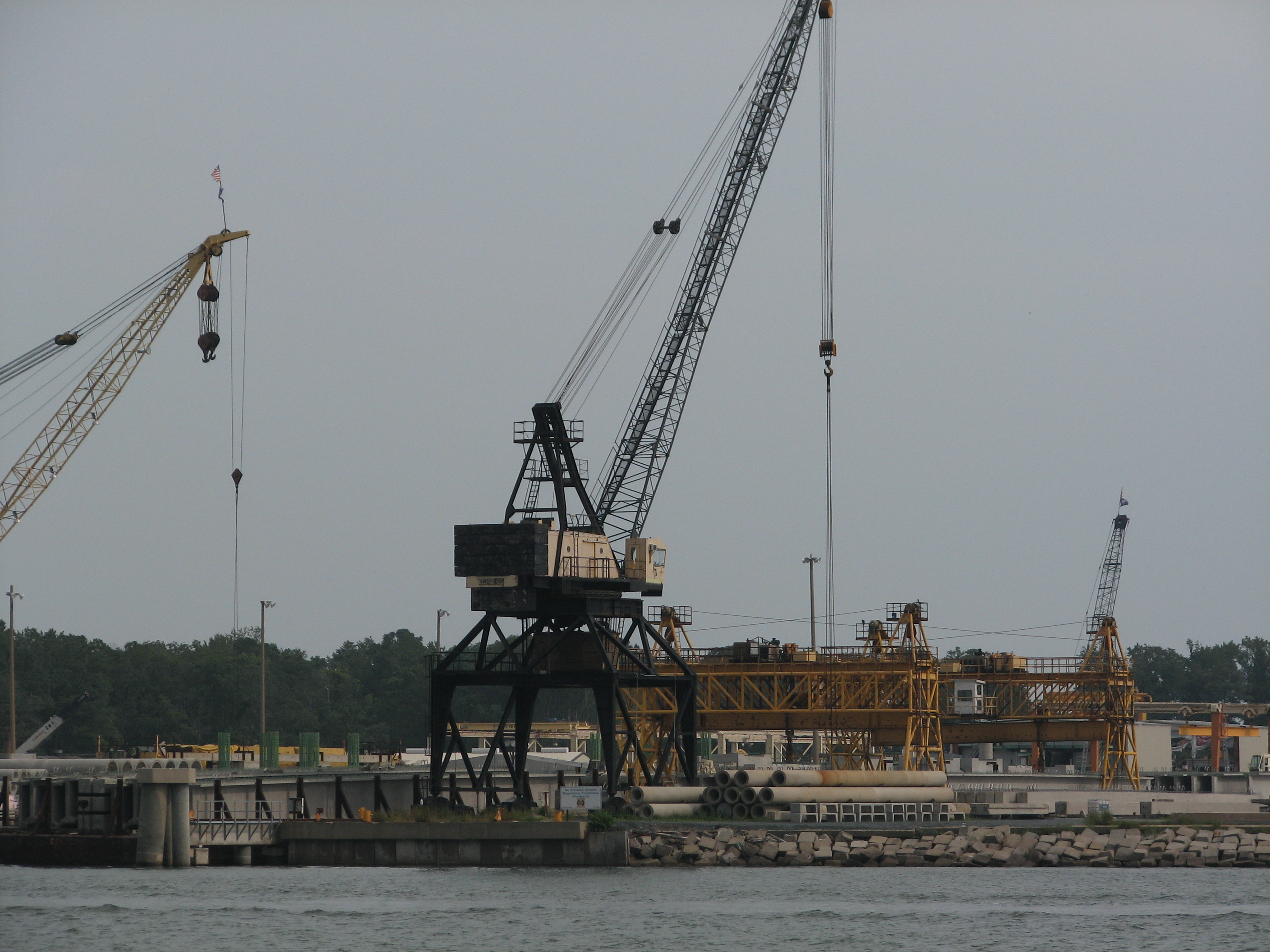
Industrial landscape in Cape Charles

Cape Charles was, for many years, the terminal for the Little Creek-Cape Charles Ferry, providing passenger and car ferry service across the mouth of the Bay to Norfolk Portsmouth, Virginia Beach and Chesapeake on the SouthSide / Tidewater and across Hampton Roads harbor to Hampton - Newport News on the northern Virginia Peninsula. The last ferry left Cape Charles in 1963. Cape Charles served as a terminal for railway freight barges that carried rail cars from the former Eastern Shore Railroad which later became Bay Coast Railroad across the mouth of the Bay to Norfolk. The Bay Coast Railroad ceased operations in 2018. There is also a cement factory nearby.

The town hosted the Northampton Red Sox in the old Eastern Shore Baseball League.

The Cape Charles Historic District and Stratton Manor are listed on the National Register of Historic Places.

== Demographics ==
Historical population
| Census | Pop. | Note | %± |
|---|---|---|---|
| 1900 | 1,040 | | — |
| 1910 | 1,948 | | 87.3% |
| 1920 | 2,517 | | 29.2% |
| 1930 | 2,527 | | 0.4% |
| 1940 | 2,299 | | −9.0% |
| 1950 | 2,427 | | 5.6% |
| 1960 | 2,041 | | −15.9% |
| 1970 | 1,689 | | −17.2% |
| 1980 | 1,512 | | −10.5% |
| 1990 | 1,398 | | −7.5% |
| 2000 | 1,134 | | −18.9% |
| 2010 | 1,009 | | −11.0% |
| 2020 | 1,178 | | 16.7% |
| 2022 (est.) | 1,183 | ▲ | 0.4% |
U.S. Decennial Census

As of the census of 2000, there were 1,134 people, 536 households, and 278 families residing in the town. The population density was 309.4 people per square mile (119.3/km^{2}). There were 740 housing units at an average density of 201.9 per square mile (77.9/km^{2}). The racial makeup of the town was 53.79% White, 42.86% African American, 0.09% Native American, 0.44% Asian, 1.59% from other races, and 1.23% from two or more races. Hispanic or Latino of any race were 2.82% of the population.

There were 536 households, out of which 21.1% had children under the age of 18 living with them, 30.4% were married couples living together, 19.6% had a female householder with no husband present, and 48.1% were non-families. 43.7% of all households were made up of individuals, and 26.3% had someone living alone who was 65 years of age or older. The average household size was 2.11 and the average family size was 2.91.

In the town, the age distribution of the population shows 22.1% under the age of 18, 7.1% from 18 to 24, 22.0% from 25 to 44, 25.0% from 45 to 64, and 23.8% who were 65 years of age or older. The median age was 44 years. For every 100 females, there were 76.4 males. For every 100 females age 18 and over, there were 75.9 males.

The median income for a household in the town was $22,237, and the median income for a family was $29,167. Males had a median income of $25,536 versus $23,984 for females. The per capita income for the town was $13,789. About 21.5% of families and 28.4% of the population were below the poverty line, including 43.4% of those under age 18 and 23.0% of those age 65 or over.

== Geography ==
Cape Charles is located at 37°16′03″N 76°00′51″W (37.267522, −76.014125).

Cape Charles lies on a peninsula and is surrounded by water on three sides. The town is situated directly on the Chesapeake Bay, bordered by King's Creek to the north and Old Plantation Creek to the south. The land in town is low lying and relatively flat, with the highest point of elevation at 15 feet, and a slope of less than 1%. Most of the developed land in town is between 5 and 10 feet in elevation.

According to the United States Census Bureau, the town has a total area of 4.4 square miles (11.3 km^{2}), of which 3.7 square miles (9.5 km^{2}) is land and 0.7 square mile (1.8 km^{2}) (16.06%) is water.

The Chesapeake Bay impact crater formed approximately 35 million years ago during the late Eocene when a comet fragment or asteroid struck the U.S. Atlantic continental shelf in the area now occupied by the southern part of Chesapeake Bay and adjacent landmasses in the Virginia Coastal Plain. The resulting structure is an approximately circular, 53-mile-diameter crater centered near the town of Cape Charles.

=== Climate ===
Under the Köppen climate classification, Cape Charles features a humid subtropical climate with hot, humid summers and chilly, but not very cold winters. Temperatures routinely exceed 90 °F in the summer and typically dip below the freezing point during the winter, though it is somewhat rare for temperatures to dip far below freezing. Cape Charles on average receives roughly 45 inches of precipitation annually. Cape Charles receives 2300 hours of sunshine annually (higher than the USA average).

Climate data for Cape Charles, 1991–2020 normals, extremes 2004–present
| Month | Jan | Feb | Mar | Apr | May | Jun | Jul | Aug | Sep | Oct | Nov | Dec | Year |
|---|---|---|---|---|---|---|---|---|---|---|---|---|---|
| Record high °F (°C) | 72 (22) | 76 (24) | 83 (28) | 87 (31) | 92 (33) | 98 (37) | 102 (39) | 98 (37) | 93 (34) | 92 (33) | 80 (27) | 78 (26) | 102 (39) |
| Mean maximum °F (°C) | 66.6 (19.2) | 68.4 (20.2) | 75.5 (24.2) | 82.2 (27.9) | 86.4 (30.2) | 92.5 (33.6) | 94.2 (34.6) | 91.3 (32.9) | 88.4 (31.3) | 82.6 (28.1) | 73.9 (23.3) | 70.4 (21.3) | 95.6 (35.3) |
| Mean daily maximum °F (°C) | 46.6 (8.1) | 48.7 (9.3) | 54.8 (12.7) | 64.7 (18.2) | 72.4 (22.4) | 80.7 (27.1) | 85.3 (29.6) | 83.4 (28.6) | 77.9 (25.5) | 68.6 (20.3) | 58.6 (14.8) | 50.9 (10.5) | 66.1 (18.9) |
| Daily mean °F (°C) | 39.4 (4.1) | 41.0 (5.0) | 46.8 (8.2) | 56.1 (13.4) | 64.9 (18.3) | 73.5 (23.1) | 78.3 (25.7) | 76.2 (24.6) | 70.9 (21.6) | 60.8 (16.0) | 50.9 (10.5) | 43.3 (6.3) | 58.5 (14.7) |
| Mean daily minimum °F (°C) | 32.1 (0.1) | 33.3 (0.7) | 38.8 (3.8) | 47.5 (8.6) | 57.5 (14.2) | 66.4 (19.1) | 71.3 (21.8) | 69.1 (20.6) | 63.9 (17.7) | 53.0 (11.7) | 43.2 (6.2) | 35.6 (2.0) | 51.0 (10.6) |
| Mean minimum °F (°C) | 16.9 (−8.4) | 18.7 (−7.4) | 25.2 (−3.8) | 34.1 (1.2) | 43.8 (6.6) | 54.2 (12.3) | 61.3 (16.3) | 59.8 (15.4) | 52.7 (11.5) | 38.8 (3.8) | 28.4 (−2.0) | 23.3 (−4.8) | 14.8 (−9.6) |
| Record low °F (°C) | 5 (−15) | 6 (−14) | 18 (−8) | 28 (−2) | 35 (2) | 46 (8) | 55 (13) | 54 (12) | 46 (8) | 32 (0) | 24 (−4) | 15 (−9) | 5 (−15) |
| Average precipitation inches (mm) | 3.37 (86) | 2.91 (74) | 3.52 (89) | 3.37 (86) | 3.47 (88) | 3.82 (97) | 4.67 (119) | 4.14 (105) | 4.21 (107) | 4.35 (110) | 3.08 (78) | 3.54 (90) | 44.45 (1,129) |
| Average precipitation days (≥ 0.01 in) | 10.1 | 10.3 | 10.0 | 11.2 | 11.8 | 11.9 | 10.8 | 12.1 | 8.7 | 9.2 | 8.9 | 10.1 | 125.1 |
Source: NOAA

== Transportation ==
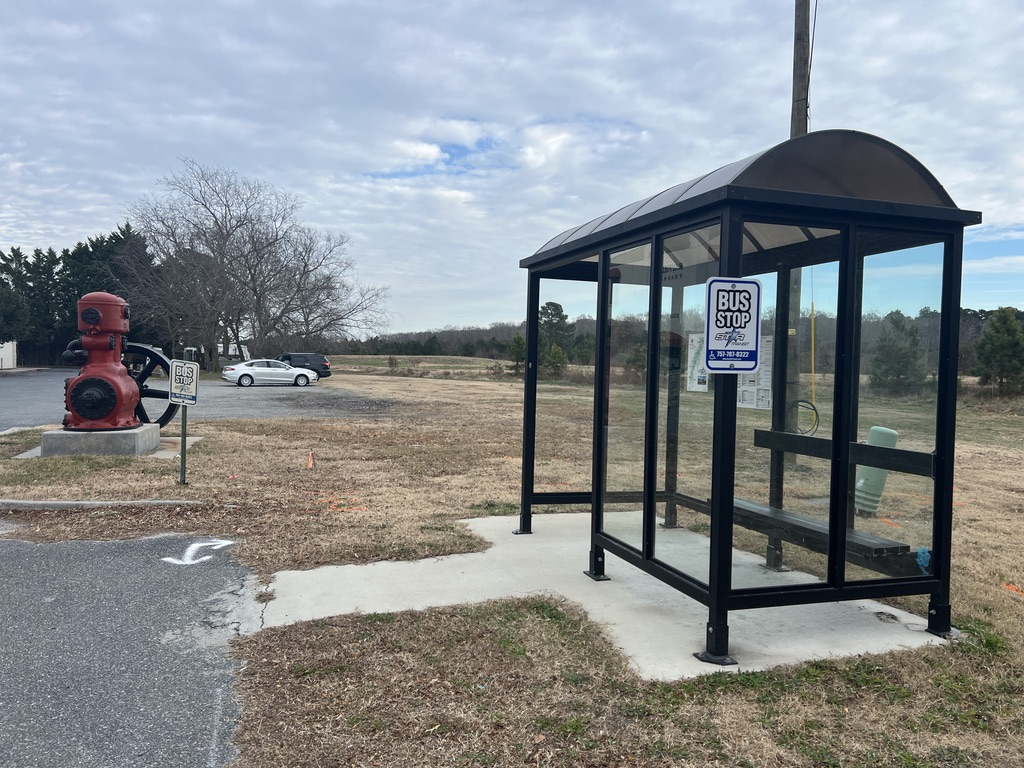
STAR Transit stop at Mason Avenue and Fig Street.

=== Major highway ===
- SR 184

=== Public transportation ===
STAR Transit provides public transit services to Cape Charles.

== Recreation ==
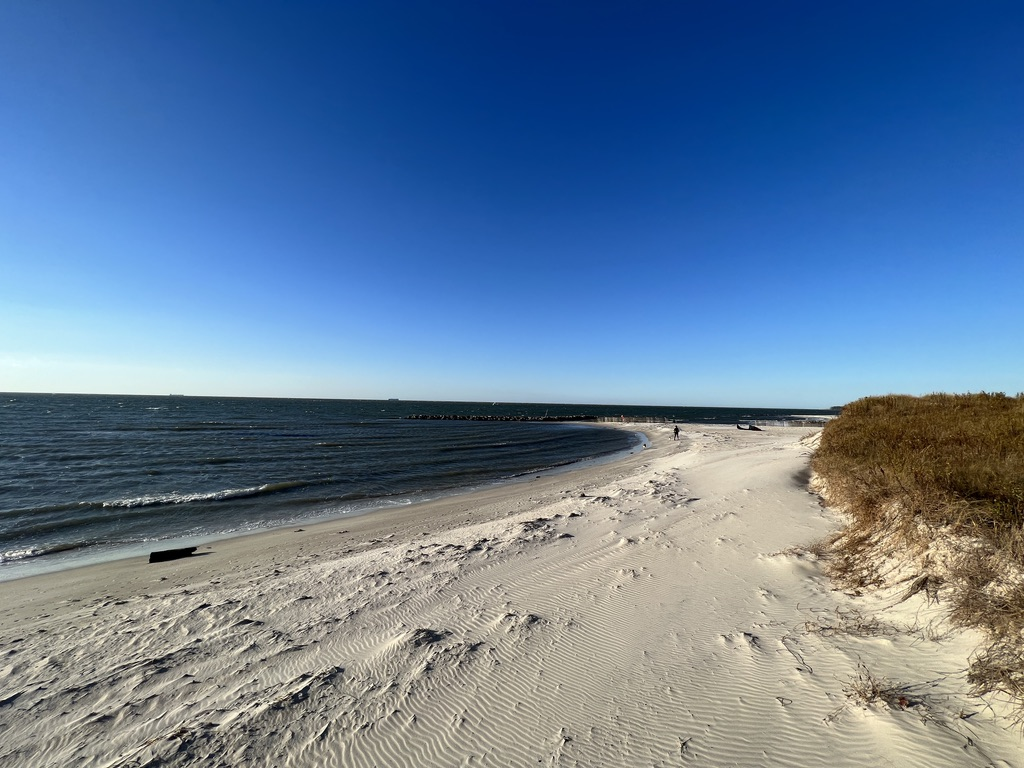
Cape Charles' public beach.

The town owns one of two public beaches on the Eastern Shore of Virginia, and the only public beach on the bayside of the Eastern Shore. The beach extends one-half mile along Bay Avenue with a paved walkway bordering the length of the beachfront. Residents and visitors of the town use the beach for swimming, sunbathing, and similar recreational pursuits. Public access onto the beachfront is provided by two wooden walkovers located near the end of Tazewell and Randolph Avenues, as well as the town's Fun Pier which also has a wooden walkover. The beach is stabilized with buried groins and a bulkhead. In 1987 the Army Corps of Engineers dredged the harbor and channel and deposited the sand along the beach area, which greatly expanded the width of the beach and improved the quality of sand along the beachfront. Beach erosion is an ongoing problem and will require sand replenishment on a periodic basis in order to maintain a sandy beachfront.

Adjacent to the public beach is a municipal pier which extends across the stone jetty at the entrance of the harbor. The wooden pier, which is known as the Fun Pier, has a railed siding and several built-in benches, and is frequently utilized by Town residents and visitors for sightseeing. Cape Charles is also home to one of six public boat ramp sites in Northampton County, and one of only three sites on the County's Bayside.

The nearby 29-acre Cape Charles Natural Area Preserve, owned by Virginia Department of Conservation and Recreation, has a long boardwalk that traverses several natural communities, including a Maritime Loblolly Pine Forest, and ends at a low bluff overlooking the Chesapeake Bay. The preserve provides habitat for the federally threatened northeastern beach tiger beetle and is part of the Lower Delmarva Important Bird Area. During fall bird migration, the forest abounds with migratory songbirds and raptors resting and feeding before continuing their journey across the Chesapeake Bay.

Cape Charles will also serve as the southern trail head for the Eastern Shore of Virginia Rail Trail, which is planned to run 49.1 miles to Hallwood along the former route of the Bay Coast Railroad.

== Industry ==
The Cape Charles Harbor serves local industry and commerce operations as well as tourists and recreational users. The harbor was originally developed to load and unload railroad cars on barges. The harbor includes extensive bulkheading, as well as commercial docking facilities for industrial uses. The Industrial land use in the Town is concentrated at the Cape Charles Harbor area, and includes the Eastern Shore Railroad, Bayshore Concrete, the commercial dock and the Sustainable Technology Park.

== Notable people ==
- Roxie Joynes Campanella (1916–2004), nurse, showgirl, philanthropist
- Johnny Sample (1936–2005), football defensive back, winner of three NFL championships
- Conny Van Dyke (1945–2023), singer and actress

== Gallery ==
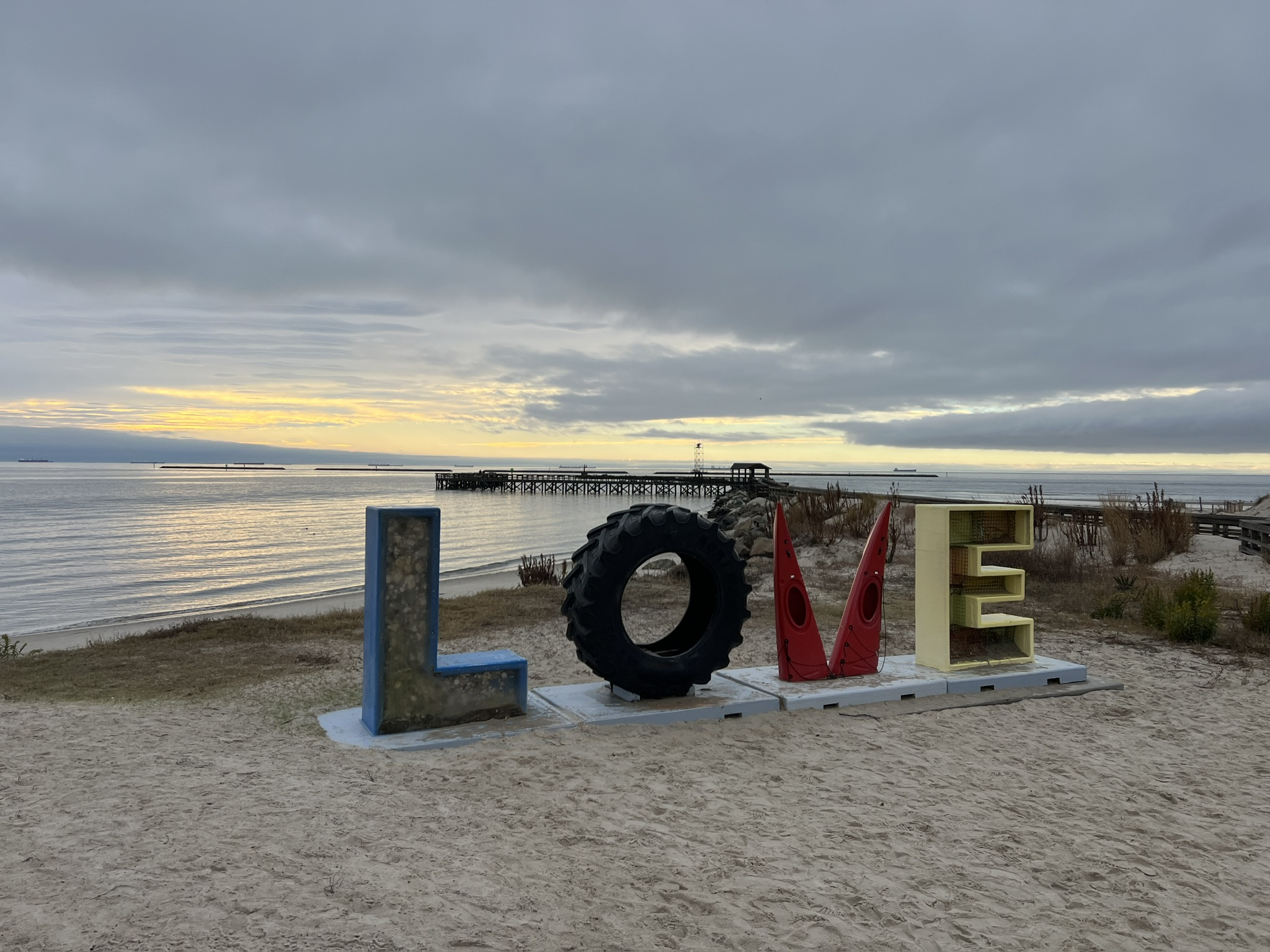
The town's Virginia Is for Lovers public sculpture.

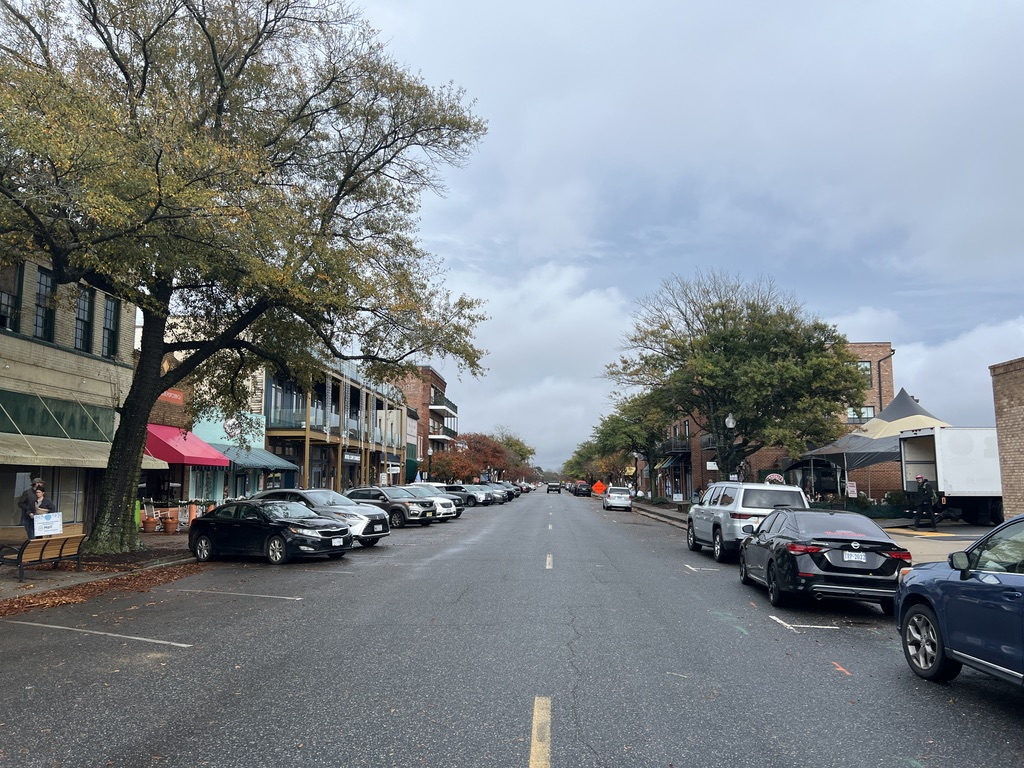
Looking east on downtown Mason Avenue.

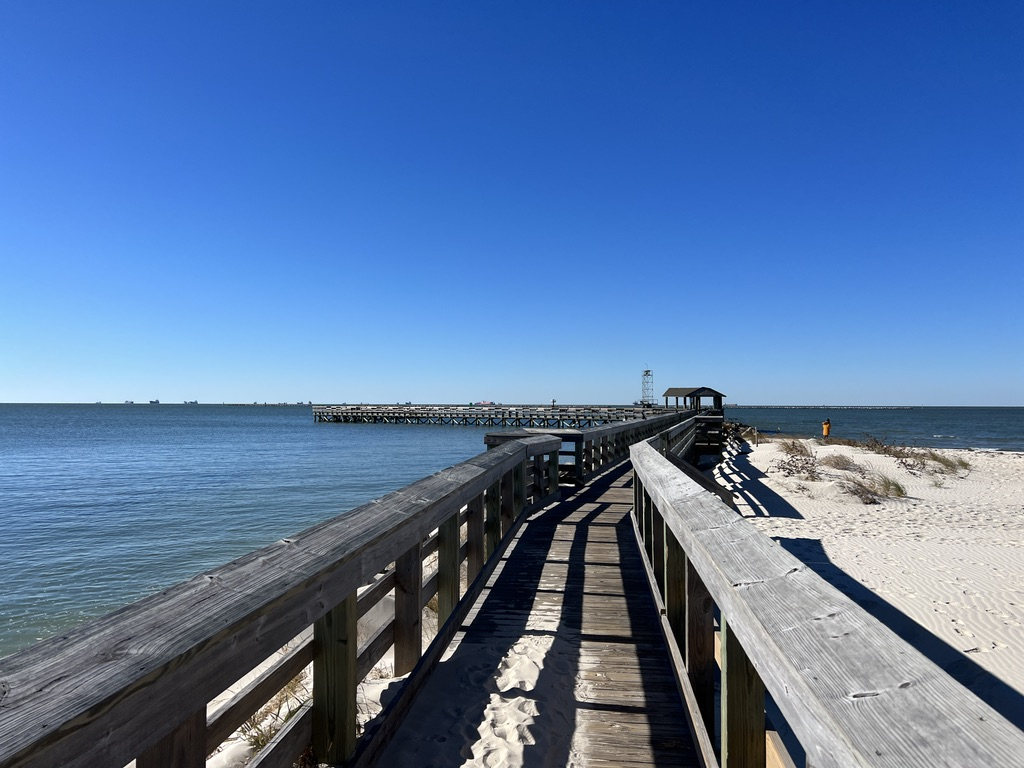
The public fishing pier in winter.

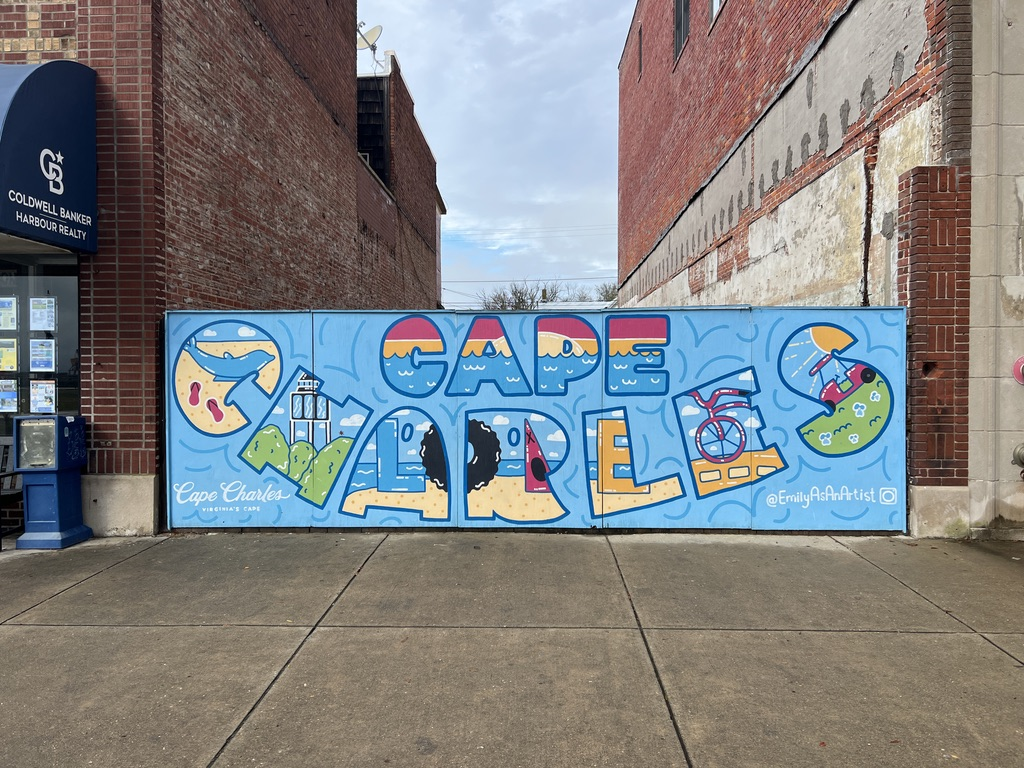
A mural on Mason Avenue in downtown.
