= Fairview, Northampton County, Virginia =

Unincorporated community in Virginia, US

Coordinates: 37°15′59″N 75°58′08″W

Fairview is an unincorporated community in Northampton County, Virginia, United States.
