= Bayford, Virginia =

Unincorporated community in Virginia, US

Coordinates: 37°28′40″N 75°55′58″W

Bayford is an unincorporated community in Northampton County, Virginia, United States.
