= Eastville Historic District =

Historic district in Virginia, United States

- U.S. National Register of Historic Places
- U.S. Historic district
- Virginia Landmarks Register
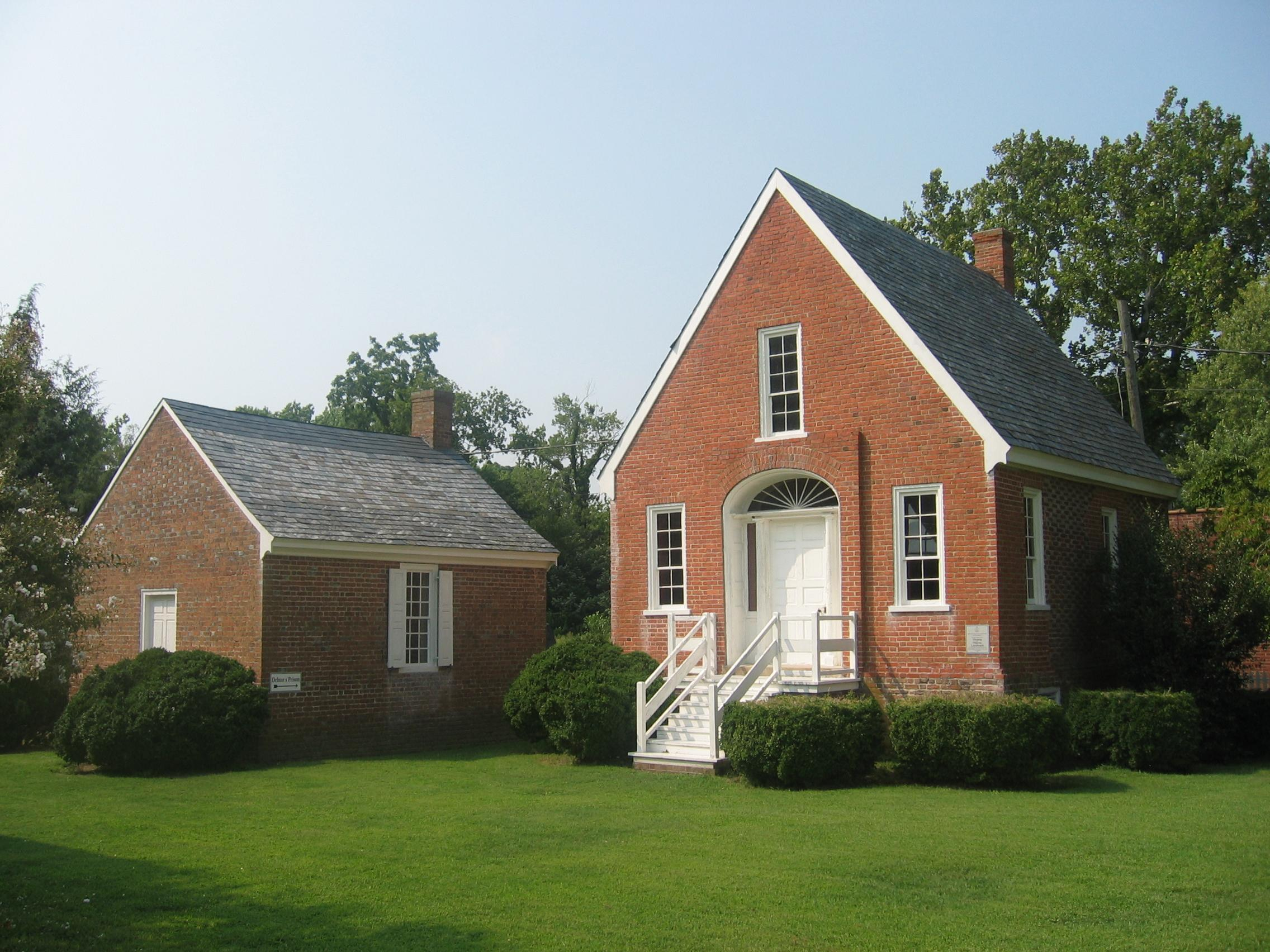
- Eastville Courthouse, August 2005

- Location within Virginia Location within the United States
- Location: Area includes VA 13, Old Town Neck Dr., Courthouse Rd., Willow Oak Rd., Rockefellow La., and Stumptown Dr., Eastville, Virginia
- Coordinates: 37°21′09″N 75°56′45″W
- Area: 478.6 acres (193.7 ha)
- Built: 1731
- Built by: Marshall, John; Rabyshaw, William
- Architectural style: Late Victorian, Colonial
- NRHP reference No.: 09000795
- VLR No.: 214-0040

Significant dates
- Added to NRHP: October 1, 2009
- Designated VLR: June 18, 2009

Eastville Historic District is a national historic district located at Eastville, Virginia, United States. The district encompasses 315 contributing buildings, 7 contributing sites, and 4 contributing structures in the county seat of Northampton County. The historic district contains a wide variety of residential, commercial, governmental, educational, social, religious, and funerary resources dating from 1731. Notable buildings include the courthouse (1731), clerk's office (c. 1750), Park Hall (c. 1750), Eastville Inn, Ingleside (c. 1810), Hickory Grounds (c. 1825), Maria Robins House (c. 1799), the Old Brick Store (c. 1820), Abdell Funeral Home (c. 1870), Edward Holland House (c. 1870, 1900), and Ailworth Hall (c. 1900). Also located in the district are the separately listed Cessford, Eastville Mercantile, and James Brown's Dry Goods Store.

It was listed on the National Register of Historic Places in 2009.
