= Robert Bayford =

English cricketer and barrister

Robert Augustus Bayford QC (13 March 1838 – 24 August 1922) was an English cricketer and barrister.

== Biography ==
Bayford was born in Albury, Surrey, and educated at Kensington Grammar School and Trinity Hall, Cambridge. He played cricket for eleven different teams at 30 first-class matches from 1857 to 1867, but was mostly involved with Marylebone Cricket Club (MCC). He was a right-handed batsman and occasional wicketkeeper who bowled roundarm slow pace. He scored 822 runs with a highest score of 92 and held seven catches with four stumpings. He took twelve wickets with a best analysis of four for 42.

After Cambridge, Bayford studied law at the Inner Temple. He was called to the Bar in 1863 and became a QC in 1885.

He died at Netley Hill, Botley, Hampshire.
