= Northampton County, Virginia =

County in Virginia, United States

- County
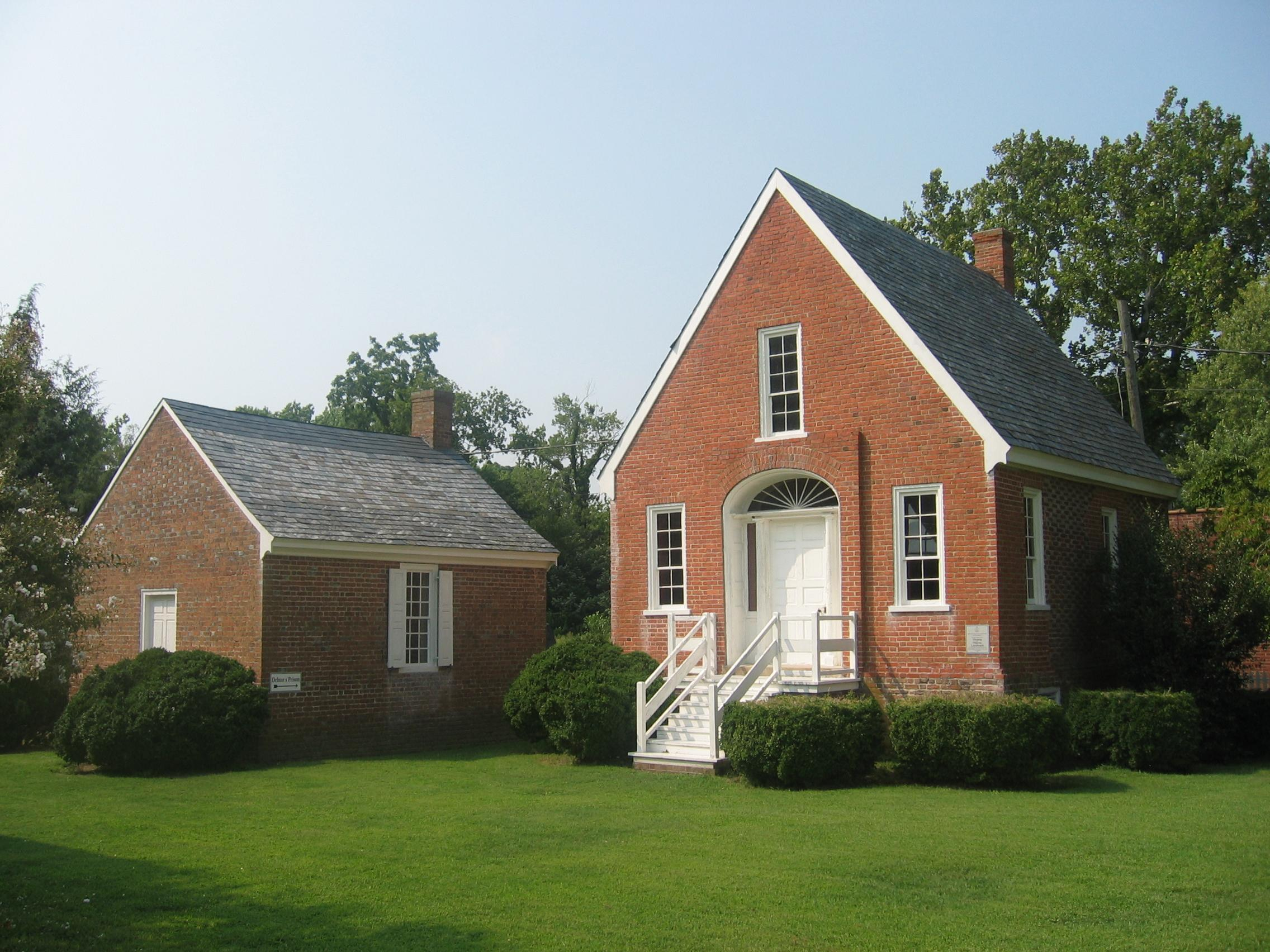
- Northampton County Courthouse Historic District

- Flag Seal

- Location within the U.S. state of Virginia
- Coordinates: 37°18′03″N 75°55′43″W
- Country: United States
- State: Virginia
- Founded: 1642
- Seat: Eastville
- Largest town: Exmore

Area
  - Total: 795 sq mi (2,060 km^{2})
  - Land: 212 sq mi (550 km^{2})
  - Water: 584 sq mi (1,510 km^{2}) 73.4%

Population (2020)
  - Total: 12,282
  - Estimate (2025): 11,879 ▼
  - Density: 57.9/sq mi (22.4/km^{2})
- Time zone: UTC−5 (Eastern)
  - Summer (DST): UTC−4 (EDT)
- Congressional district: 2nd
- Website: www.co.northampton.va.us

Northampton County is a county located in the Virginia, United States. As of the 2020 census, the population was 12,282. Its county seat is Eastville. Northampton and Accomack Counties are a part of the larger Eastern Shore of Virginia.

The county is the center of the late Eocene meteor strike that resulted in the Chesapeake Bay impact crater. The Northampton County Courthouse Historic District is part of the Eastville Historic District at the county seat.

== History ==
When English colonists first arrived in the area in the early 1600s, the Virginia Eastern Shore region was governed by Debedeavon (aka "The Laughing King"), who was the paramount chief of the Accomac people, which numbered around 2,000 at the time. The former name of the county was Accomac Shire, one of the original eight shires of Virginia created in 1634 after the founding of the first settlement at Jamestown in 1607. In 1642, the name was changed to Northampton County by the colonists. In 1663, Northampton County was split into two counties that still exist today. The northern two-thirds took the original "Accomac" name (Accomack County), while the southern third to the Point Cape Charles remained as Northampton.

=== Slavery ===
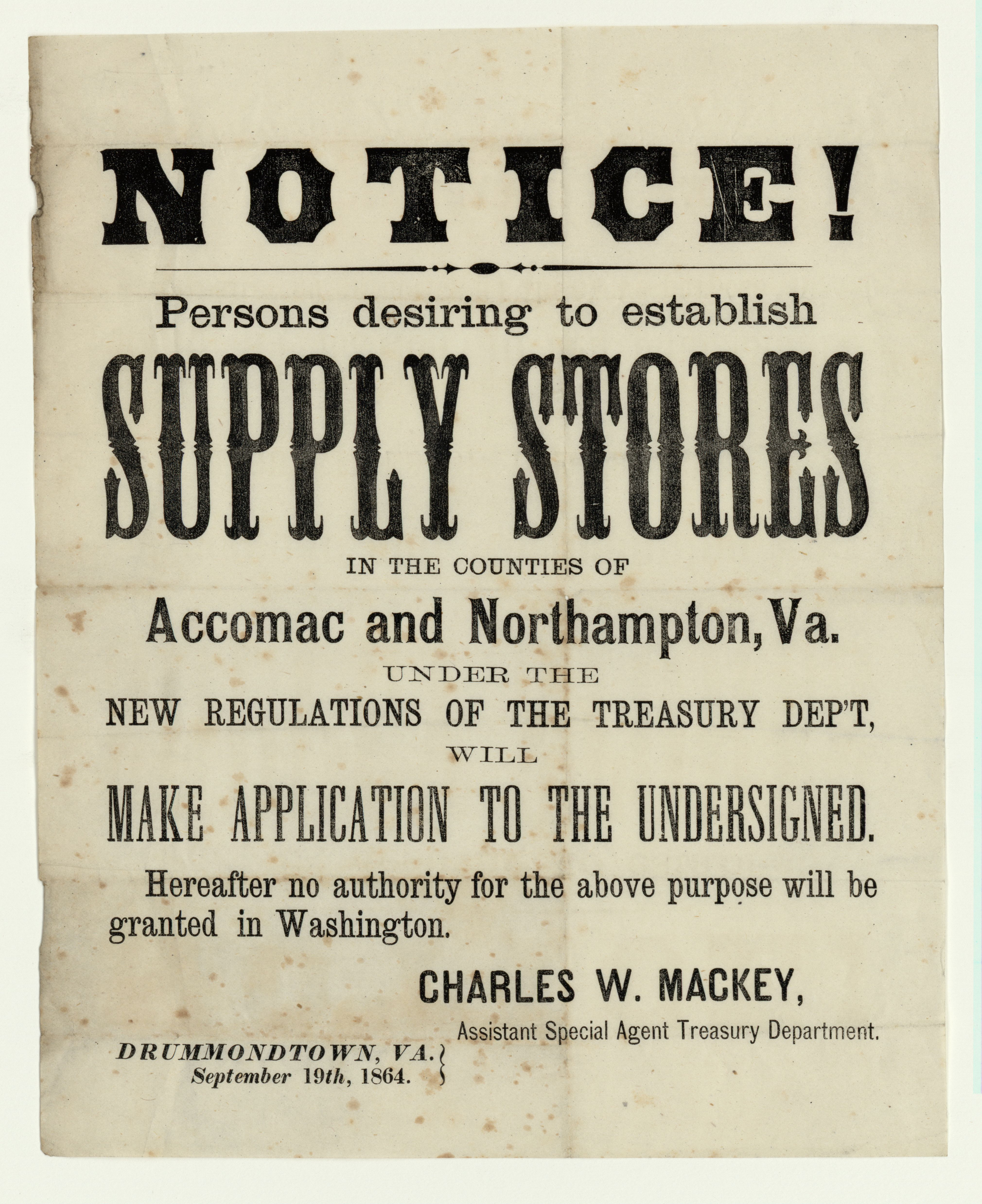
Notice to persons "desiring to establish supply stores" in Accomac and Northampton Counties, Virginia, September 19, 1864

Northampton County is notable for a colonial court case involving an indentured servant. The first free negro in North America was Anthony Johnson of Northampton County. Johnson was one of the first black Americans to own land in America. In 1653, Johnson brought suit in Northampton County Court to argue that one of his servants, John Casor, was indentured to him for life. Casor had left him and was working for a neighbor. This was the first instance of a judicial determination in the Thirteen Colonies holding that a person who had committed no crime could be held in servitude for life.

This court ruling decision also gives insight to how owners of indentured servants could easily choose to ignore the expiration of indentured contracts and force their servants into lifetime slavery. Although Casor, an African, had well-known white planters taking his part, he was reduced to lifetime slavery. Some planters sought more profitable methods of labor by taking advantage of Negro indentured servants, who had little recourse in the legal and social system to protect their rights.

== Geography ==
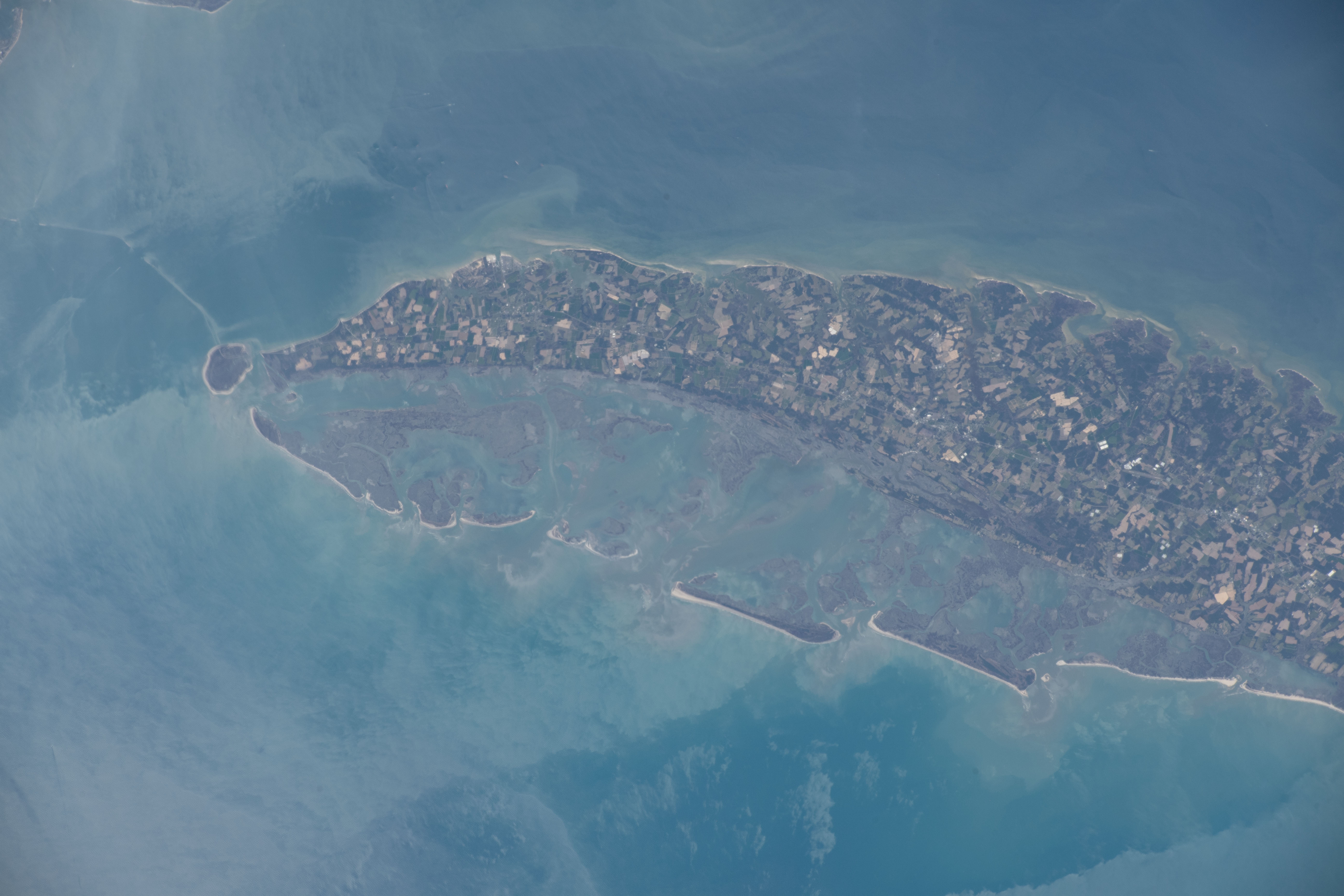
Satellite picture of Northampton County

According to the U.S. Census Bureau, the county has a total area of 795 square miles (2,060 km^{2}), of which 212 square miles (550 km^{2}) is land and 584 square miles (1,510 km^{2}) (73.4%) is water.

=== Adjacent county and independent city ===
- Accomack County – north
- Virginia Beach, Virginia – south

=== National protected areas ===
- Eastern Shore of Virginia National Wildlife Refuge
- Fisherman Island National Wildlife Refuge

== Demographics ==
Historical population
Census	Pop.	Note	%±
1790	6,889		—
1800	6,763		−1.8%
1810	7,474		10.5%
1820	7,705		3.1%
1830	8,641		12.1%
1840	7,715		−10.7%
1850	7,498		−2.8%
1860	7,832		4.5%
1870	8,046		2.7%
1880	9,152		13.7%
1890	10,313		12.7%
1900	13,770		33.5%
1910	16,672		21.1%
1920	17,852		7.1%
1930	18,565		4.0%
1940	17,597		−5.2%
1950	17,300		−1.7%
1960	16,966		−1.9%
1970	14,442		−14.9%
1980	14,625		1.3%
1990	13,061		−10.7%
2000	13,093		0.2%
2010	12,389		−5.4%
2020	12,282		−0.9%
2025 (est.)	11,879	▼	−3.3%
U.S. Decennial Census; 1790-1960 1900-1990; 1990-2000 2010 2020

=== Racial and ethnic composition ===
Northampton County, Virginia – Racial and ethnic composition Note: the US Census treats Hispanic/Latino as an ethnic category. This table excludes Latinos from the racial categories and assigns them to a separate category. Hispanics/Latinos may be of any race.
Race / Ethnicity (NH = Non-Hispanic)	Pop 1980	Pop 1990	Pop 2000	Pop 2010	Pop 2020	% 1980	% 1990	% 2000	% 2010	% 2020
White alone (NH)	7,222	6,747	6,878	6,755	6,932	49.38%	51.66%	52.53%	54.52%	56.44%
Black or African American alone (NH)	7,179	6,025	5,602	4,491	3,756	49.09%	46.13%	42.79%	36.25%	30.58%
Native American or Alaska Native alone (NH)	9	16	21	26	58	0.06%	0.12%	0.16%	0.21%	0.47%
Asian alone (NH)	16	16	25	81	80	0.11%	0.12%	0.19%	0.65%	0.65%
Native Hawaiian or Pacific Islander alone (NH)	x	x	3	2	8	x	x	0.02%	0.02%	0.07%
Other race alone (NH)	5	1	9	15	30	0.03%	0.01%	0.07%	0.12%	0.24%
Mixed race or Multiracial (NH)	x	x	101	145	350	x	x	0.77%	1.17%	2.85%
Hispanic or Latino (any race)	194	256	454	874	1,068	1.33%	1.96%	3.47%	7.05%	8.70%
Total	14,625	13,061	13,093	12,389	12,282	100.00%	100.00%	100.00%	100.00%	100.00%

=== 2020 census ===
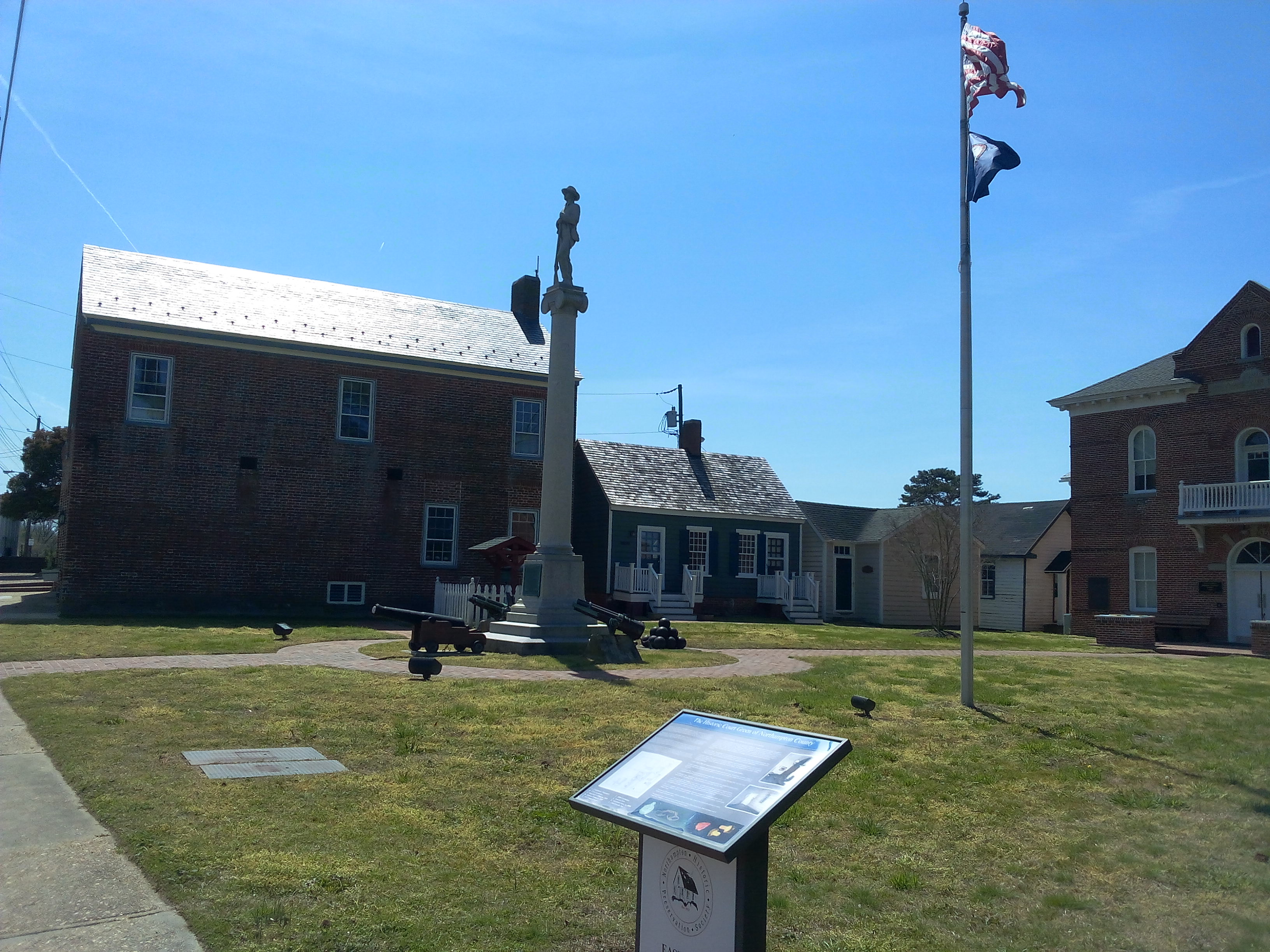
Courthouse, Confederate Monument, and Lawyers Row in Eastville

As of the 2020 census, the county had a population of 12,282. The median age was 52.1 years. 18.1% of residents were under the age of 18 and 28.0% of residents were 65 years of age or older. For every 100 females there were 89.7 males, and for every 100 females age 18 and over there were 85.6 males age 18 and over.

The racial makeup of the county was 57.6% White, 30.8% Black or African American, 0.7% American Indian and Alaska Native, 0.7% Asian, 0.1% Native Hawaiian and Pacific Islander, 4.5% from some other race, and 5.7% from two or more races. Hispanic or Latino residents of any race comprised 8.7% of the population.

0.0% of residents lived in urban areas, while 100.0% lived in rural areas.

There were 5,457 households in the county, of which 21.8% had children under the age of 18 living with them and 34.0% had a female householder with no spouse or partner present. About 33.8% of all households were made up of individuals and 17.3% had someone living alone who was 65 years of age or older.

There were 7,373 housing units, of which 26.0% were vacant. Among occupied housing units, 67.8% were owner-occupied and 32.2% were renter-occupied. The homeowner vacancy rate was 2.8% and the rental vacancy rate was 8.6%.

Northampton County is home to the United States' oldest continuous court records.

== Transportation ==
=== Airports ===
- Campbell Field Airport

=== Major highways ===
- US 13
- US 13 Bus.
- SR 178
- SR 183
- SR 184

=== Public transportation ===
STAR Transit provides public transit services for both Northampton and Accomack counties.

== Education ==
Northampton County Public Schools operates public schools in the county. High schoolers in Northampton county are served by Northampton High School.

== Communities ==
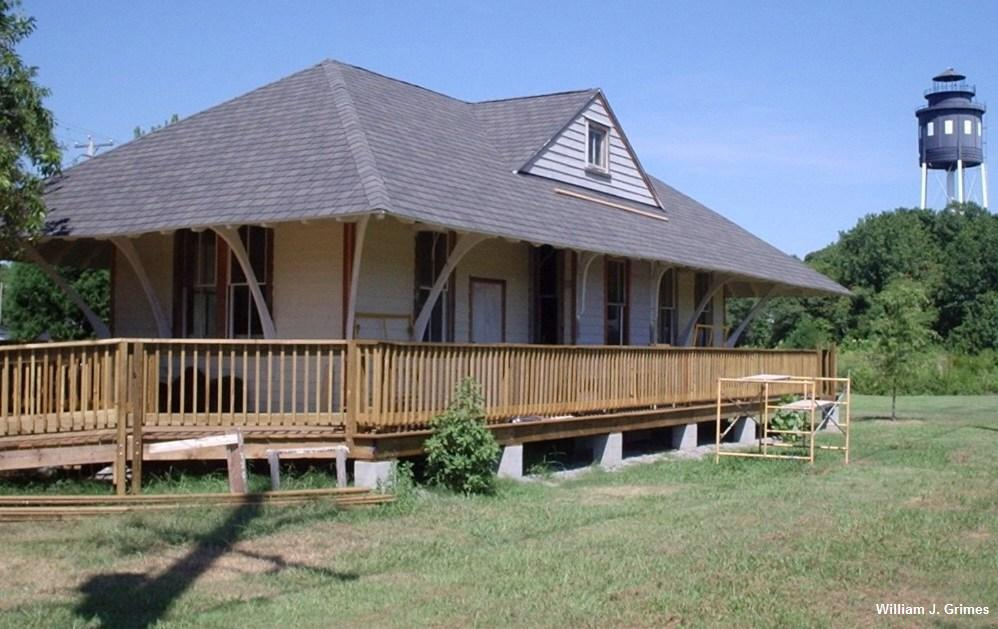
Cape Charles, Virginia

=== Towns ===
- Belle Haven (Partly in Accomack County)
- Cape Charles
- Cheriton
- Eastville
- Exmore
- Nassawadox

=== Census-designated places ===
- Franktown
- Willis Wharf

=== Other unincorporated communities ===
- Arlington
- Bacon Hill
- Bay Ridge
- Bayford
- Bayview
- Beverly
- Birdsnest
- Bridgetown
- Broadwater
- Capeville
- Cedar Grove
- Cheapside
- Cherrystone
- Chesapeake
- Clearview
- Culls
- Dalbys
- Eastville Station
- Fairview
- Hadlock
- Hare Valley
- Highland Heights
- Hungars Point
- James Crossroads
- Jamesville
- Johnson Cove
- Johnsontown
- Kendall Grove
- Kiptopeke
- Little Johnsontown
- Little Salisbury
- Machipongo
- Magotha
- Marionville
- Middletown
- Nottingham
- Oakland Park
- Oyster
- Pat Town
- Red Bank
- Reedtown
- Seaview
- Shadyside
- Sheps End
- Silver Beach
- Simpkins
- Smith Beach
- Stumptown
- The Meadows
- Townsend
- Treherneville
- Wardtown
- Weirwood
- Woodstock

== Politics ==
Northampton County leans towards the Democratic Party. In presidential elections, it has voted for the Democratic nominee every time since 1992. However, it has been shifting toward the Republican Party, with the party improving in its percentage share since 2008, as well as narrowing margins, except in 2020.

United States presidential election results for Northampton County, Virginia
Year	Republican		Democratic		Third party(ies)	
Year	No.	%	No.	%	No.	%
1912	83	9.37%	726	81.94%	77	8.69%
1916	109	11.85%	802	87.17%	9	0.98%
1920	217	18.42%	954	80.98%	7	0.59%
1924	180	15.53%	941	81.19%	38	3.28%
1928	688	42.39%	935	57.61%	0	0.00%
1932	298	18.90%	1,264	80.15%	15	0.95%
1936	277	22.07%	975	77.69%	3	0.24%
1940	359	29.23%	866	70.52%	3	0.24%
1944	381	25.52%	1,108	74.21%	4	0.27%
1948	525	29.86%	997	56.71%	236	13.42%
1952	1,307	50.12%	1,289	49.42%	12	0.46%
1956	1,264	51.03%	1,132	45.70%	81	3.27%
1960	995	41.60%	1,387	57.98%	10	0.42%
1964	1,586	51.11%	1,516	48.86%	1	0.03%
1968	1,410	35.48%	1,418	35.68%	1,146	28.84%
1972	2,587	66.45%	1,246	32.01%	60	1.54%
1976	2,043	43.15%	2,459	51.93%	233	4.92%
1980	2,165	45.65%	2,363	49.82%	215	4.53%
1984	2,906	55.81%	2,226	42.75%	75	1.44%
1988	2,562	52.00%	2,242	45.50%	123	2.50%
1992	2,088	37.17%	2,568	45.71%	962	17.12%
1996	1,763	35.63%	2,569	51.92%	616	12.45%
2000	2,299	47.00%	2,340	47.83%	253	5.17%
2004	2,669	48.54%	2,775	50.46%	55	1.00%
2008	2,713	41.19%	3,800	57.70%	73	1.11%
2012	2,676	41.23%	3,741	57.63%	74	1.14%
2016	2,686	43.52%	3,255	52.74%	231	3.74%
2020	2,955	43.89%	3,667	54.47%	110	1.63%
2024	3,183	46.43%	3,603	52.55%	70	1.02%

== Notable people ==
- John Casor, the first person of African descent in England's Thirteen Colonies to be declared as a slave for life as the result of a civil suit
- Adrian "Ace" Custis (1974-), former NCAA All-America basketball player at Virginia Tech, which retired his jersey. He is a 1992 graduate of Northampton High School.
- Alvy Powell (1955-), opera singer, performed National Anthem at inauguration of President George H. W. Bush. He is a 1974 graduate of Northampton High School.
- Ralph Northam (1959-), 40th Lieutenant Governor of Virginia (2014-2018) and 73rd Governor of Virginia (2018-2022).
- Abel Upshur (1791–1844), born in Northampton County, United States Secretary of State and United States Secretary of the Navy
- Tyler Webb (1990-), MLB relief pitcher who played for four different teams over five seasons.

== See also ==
- National Register of Historic Places listings in Northampton County, Virginia
