= National Register of Historic Places listings in Northampton County, Virginia =

Location of Northampton County in Virginia

This is intended to be a complete list of the properties and districts on the National Register of Historic Places in Northampton County, Virginia, United States. The locations of National Register properties and districts for which the latitude and longitude coordinates are included below, may be seen in an online map.

There are 30 properties and districts listed on the National Register in the county, including 2 National Historic Landmarks. Another 3 properties were once listed but have been removed.

This National Park Service list is complete through NPS recent listings posted May 1, 2026.

== Current listings ==
	Name on the Register	Image	Date listed	Location	City or town	Description
1	Almshouse Farm at Machipongo	Almshouse Farm at Machipongo	April 1, 2002 (#02000317)	12402 U.S. Route 13; 37°24′16″N 75°54′18″W	Machipongo	
2	Arlington Archeological Site	Arlington Archeological Site	May 12, 2008 (#08000422)	Address Restricted	Capeville	
3	Benjamin's Department Store	Benjamin's Department Store	May 10, 2006 (#06000367)	3327 Main St. 37°31′49″N 75°49′20″W	Exmore	
4	James Brown's Dry Goods Store	James Brown's Dry Goods Store	April 1, 2002 (#02000321)	16464 Courthouse Rd. 37°21′07″N 75°56′48″W	Eastville	
5	Brownsville	Brownsville	February 26, 1970 (#70000819)	East of the junction of Seaside and Brownsville Rds. 37°28′24″N 75°49′24″W	Nassawadox	
6	Cape Charles Historic District	Cape Charles Historic District	January 3, 1991 (#90002122)	Roughly bounded by Washington, Bay, and Mason Aves., and Fig St. 37°16′11″N 76°00′59″W	Cape Charles	
7	Cape Charles Light Station	Cape Charles Light Station	June 23, 2003 (#03000569)	Smith Island; 37°07′22″N 75°54′24″W	Kiptopeke	
8	Cape Charles Rosenwald School		October 26, 2023 (#100009536)	1500 Old Cape Charles Road; 37°15′48″N 76°00′33″W	Cape Charles	
9	Cessford	Cessford	January 16, 2004 (#03001441)	16546 Courthouse Rd. 37°20′59″N 75°56′53″W	Eastville	
10	John W. Chandler House	John W. Chandler House	November 27, 2004 (#04001270)	3342 Main St. 37°31′48″N 75°49′24″W	Exmore	
11	Chatham		September 20, 2022 (#100008186)	9218 Chatham Rd. 37°27′22″N 75°55′38″W	Machipongo vicinity	
12	Custis Tombs	Custis Tombs	April 17, 1970 (#70000815)	Arlington Chase Rd. 37°13′45″N 76°00′13″W	Cheapside	
13	Eastville Historic District	Eastville Historic District	October 1, 2009 (#09000795)	Area includes U.S. Route 13, Old Town Neck Dr., Courthouse Rd., Willow Oak Rd., Rockefellow La., and Stumptown Dr. 37°21′10″N 75°56′44″W	Eastville	
14	Eastville Mercantile	Eastville Mercantile	January 20, 2005 (#04001540)	16429 Courthouse Rd. 37°21′10″N 75°56′46″W	Eastville	
15	Eyre Hall	Eyre Hall	November 12, 1969 (#69000265)	West of U.S. Route 13; 37°18′48″N 75°58′54″W	Cheriton	
16	Eyreville		March 15, 2024 (#100009579)	3259 Eyreville Drive; 37°19′17″N 75°58′55″W	Cheriton vicinity	
17	Glebe of Hungar's Parish	Glebe of Hungar's Parish	February 26, 1970 (#70000817)	Northwest of the junction of Glebe and Church Neck Rds. 37°27′38″N 75°57′34″W	Franktown	
18	Grapeland	Grapeland	May 6, 1980 (#80004207)	Grapeland Circle, north of Wardtown; 37°32′40″N 75°52′54″W	Wardtown	
19	Hungars Church	Hungars Church	October 15, 1970 (#70000813)	East of the junction of Bayside and Church Neck Rds. 37°26′47″N 75°55′26″W	Bridgetown	
20	Kendall Grove	Kendall Grove	June 21, 1982 (#82004576)	Kendall Grove Rd. 37°22′56″N 75°56′34″W	Eastville	
21	Northampton County Courthouse Historic District	Northampton County Courthouse Historic District	April 13, 1972 (#72001410)	East along U.S. Route 13 and extending 0.1 miles (0.16 km) to the west, north, and south from its intersection with Willow Oak Rd. 37°21′12″N 75°56′48″W	Eastville	
22	Northampton Lumber Company Historic District	Northampton Lumber Company Historic District	May 29, 2008 (#08000480)	Junction of U.S. Route 13 and Mill St. 37°28′24″N 75°51′30″W	Nassawadox	
23	Oak Grove		February 4, 1993 (#93000006)	Northern side of Old Town Neck Dr., 1 mile (1.6 km) west of the junction with US 13; 37°23′16″N 75°57′23″W	Eastville	
24	Pear Valley	Pear Valley	November 12, 1969 (#69000266)	South of the junction of Wilsonia Neck and Pear Cottage Drs. 37°23′48″N 75°55′22″W	Eastville	
25	Selma	Selma	May 10, 2006 (#06000368)	16237 Courthouse Rd. 37°21′25″N 75°56′32″W	Eastville	
26	Stratton Manor	Stratton Manor	November 28, 1980 (#80004206)	Southeast of Cape Charles off Parsons Circle; 37°15′42″N 75°59′00″W	Cape Charles	
27	Upper Ridge Site		August 23, 2005 (#05000914)	Atlantic Ocean beach 37°13′19″N 75°53′04″W	Mockhorn Island	
28	Vaucluse	Vaucluse	September 15, 1970 (#70000814)	South of the junction of Church Neck and Sparrow Pt. Rds. 37°25′05″N 75°58′23″W	Bridgetown	
29	Westerhouse House		November 19, 1974 (#74002139)	West of Bridgetown off Church Neck Rd. 37°26′52″N 75°58′06″W	Bridgetown	
30	Winona	Winona	October 1, 1969 (#69000264)	Southwest of the junction of Glebe and Church Neck Rds. 37°26′25″N 75°56′08″W	Bridgetown	

== Former listings ==
	Name on the Register	Image	Date listed	Date removed	Location	City or town	Description
1	Caserta	Caserta	February 26, 1970 (#70000816)	March 19, 2001	NW of junction of Routes 630 and US 13	Eastville	Destroyed by fire in 1975
2	Somers House	Somers House	February 26, 1970 (#70000818)	June 10, 2005	SE of jct. of Rtes. 183 and 691	Jamesville	Demolished
3	Westover	Westover	June 28, 1982 (#82004577)	March 19, 2001	VA 630	Eastville	Destroyed by fire

== See also ==
- List of National Historic Landmarks in Virginia
- National Register of Historic Places listings in Virginia
