= Virginia State Route 183 =

State highway in Northampton County, Virginia, US

State Route 183
- Occohannock Neck Road

Route information
- Maintained by VDOT
- Length: 7.45 mi (11.99 km)
- Existed: 1933–present

Major junctions
- West end: SR 613 / SR 709 in Jamesville
- US 13 in Exmore
- East end: US 13 Bus. in Exmore

Location
- Country: United States
- State: Virginia
- Counties: Northampton

Highway system
- Virginia Routes; Interstate; US; Primary; Secondary; Byways; History; HOT lanes
← SR 182	→ SR 184

State Route 183 is a primary state highway in the U.S. state of Virginia. Known as Occohannock Neck Road, the state highway runs 7.45 miles (11.99 km) from SR 613 and SR 709 in Jamesville east to U.S. Route 13 Business (US 13 Business) in Exmore in northern Northampton County.

== Route description ==
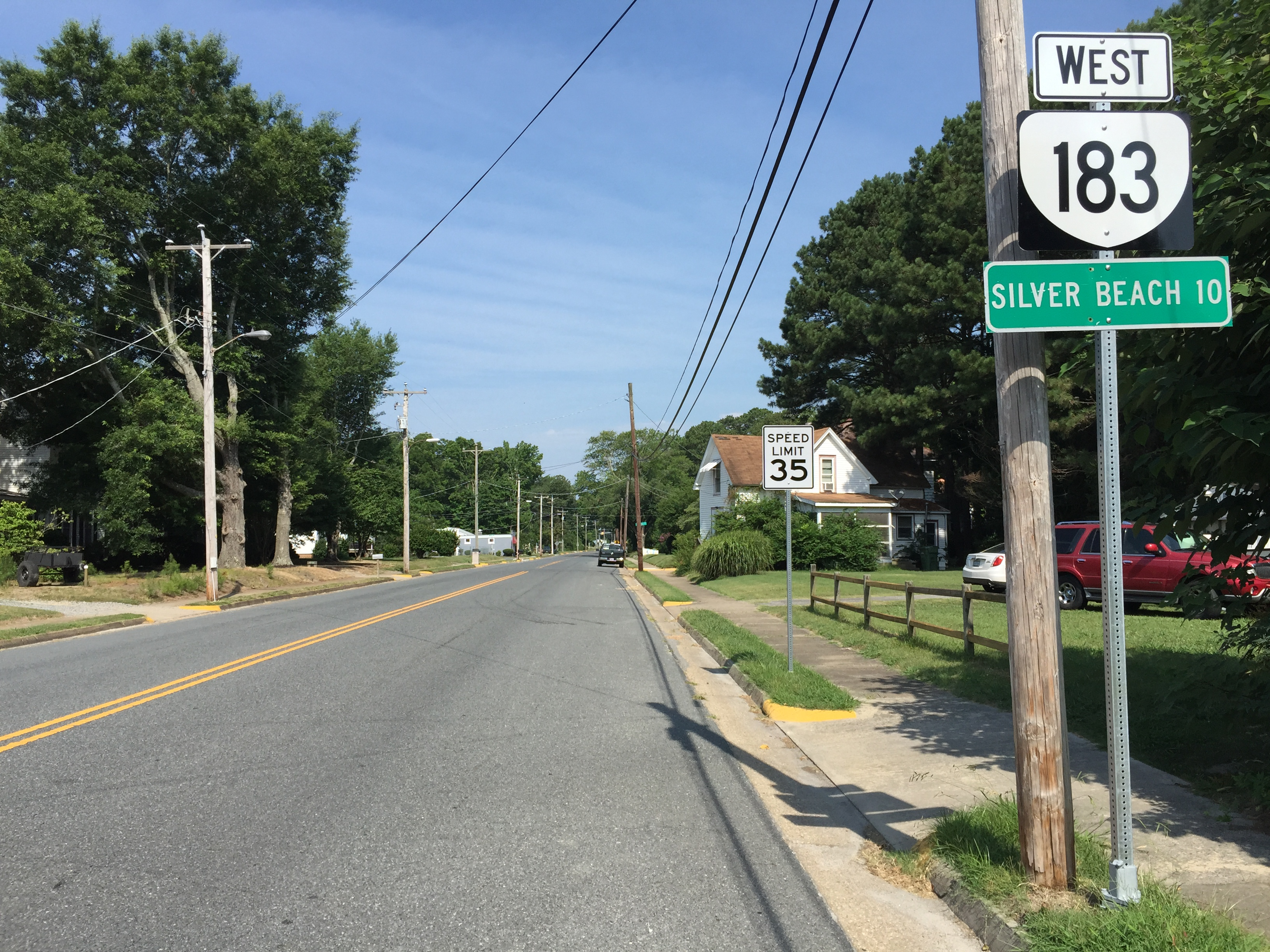
View west along SR 183 at US 13 Bus. in Exmore

SR 183 begins at an intersection with SR 613 and SR 709 in Jamesville. Occohannock Neck Road continues south along SR 613 to Silver Beach. The state highway heads northeast and east as a two-lane undivided road along the spine of Occohannock Neck, which lies between the Chesapeake Bay to the west and Nassawadox Creek to the south and east. SR 183 passes through the hamlet of Wardtown and has a pair of sharp curves before entering the town of Exmore just west of its intersection with US 13 (Lankford Highway). The state highway reaches its eastern terminus at US 13 Business (Main Street) in the center of the town, two blocks south of the southern terminus of SR 178.

== Major intersections ==
The entire route is in Northampton County.

Location	mi	km	Destinations	Notes
Jamesville	0.00	0.00	SR 613 south (Occohannock Neck Road) / SR 709 west (Battle Point Road) – Silver Beach	Western terminus
Exmore	6.94	11.17	US 13 (Lankford Highway) – Painter, Nassawadox	
Exmore	7.45	11.99	US 13 Bus. (Main Street) – Accomac, Eastville	Eastern terminus
1.000 mi = 1.609 km; 1.000 km = 0.621 mi

< SR 536	District 5 State Routes; 1928–1933	SR 538 >
