= Westover =

Westover may refer to:

== People ==
- Al Westover (born 1954), American professional basketball player in Australia
- Arthur Westover (1864–1935), Canadian sport shooter and 1908 Olympian
- Charles Westover (1934–1990), better known as Del Shannon, American musician and composer
- Harry Clay Westover (1894–1983), United States federal judge
- Jack Westover (born 1999), American football player
- Oscar Westover (1883–1938), United States Army major general, fourth chief of the United States Army Air Corps
- Russ Westover (1886–1966), American cartoonist
- Tara Westover (born 1986), American memoirist, essayist, and historian
- Theodorick Bland of Westover (1629–1671), Virginia politician, merchant, and planter
- Winifred Westover (1899–1978), American film actress

== Places ==
=== Localities in the United States ===
- Westover, Alabama, a city
- Westover, Stamford, Connecticut, a neighborhood in Stamford, Connecticut
- Westover, Maryland, an unincorporated community
- Westover, Missouri, an unincorporated community
- Westover, New York, a hamlet in the town of Union
- Westover, Pennsylvania, a borough
- Westover, South Dakota, an unincorporated community
- Westover, Arlington, Virginia, a neighborhood in Arlington, Virginia
- Westover, Charles City County, Virginia, an unincorporated community
- Westover, West Virginia, a city

=== Transportation facilities in the United States ===
- Westover Air Reserve Base, a United States Air Force Reserve Command installation in Chicopee and Ludlow, Massachusetts, United States
- Westover Metropolitan Airport, a civilian airport in Chicopee, Granby, and Ludlow, Massachusetts, United States

=== In the United Kingdom ===
- Westover, Hampshire, the ancient manor, now in Dorset, United Kingdom, over which much of modern Bournemouth has developed
- Westover Down, a chalk down on the Isle of Wight, United Kingdom

== Schools ==
- Westover Christian Academy, a non-denominational Christian school in Danville, Virginia, United States
- Westover Comprehensive High School, a public high school in Albany, Georgia, United States
- Westover High School (Fayetteville, North Carolina), a public high school in Fayetteville, North Carolina, United States
- Westover School, an independent college-preparatory day and boarding school for girls in Middlebury, Connecticut, United States

== Ships ==
- USS Westover (ID-2867), a United States Navy cargo ship commissioned in May 1918 and sunk in July 1918

== Historic sites ==
- Westover Church, a historic church near Charles City, Virginia, United States
- Westover Manor, a historic house in Westover Hills, Texas, United States
- Westover Plantation, a National Historic Landmark in Charles City County, Virginia, United States
- Westover (Milledgeville, Georgia), a plantation
- Westover (Eastville, Virginia), a plantation house

== Other ==
- Westover (horse), Thoroughbred racehorse

== See also ==
- Westover–Bacon–Potts Farm
- Westover and Bournemouth Rowing Club, now Bournemouth Rowing Club
- Westover Gardens, Virginia
- Westover Hills (disambiguation)
