= Upper Ridge Site =

Archaeological site in Virginia, United States

- U.S. National Register of Historic Places
- Nearest city: Mockhorn Island, Virginia
- Area: 6 acres (2.4 ha)
- NRHP reference No.: 05000914
- Added to NRHP: August 23, 2005

The Upper Ridge Site is an archeological site on Mockhorn Island, a barrier island off the coast of the Eastern Shore of Virginia in Northampton County. The site documents over 10,000 years of human occupation from Paleo-Indian through Middle Woodland periods (9500 B.C. to A.D. 900).

The site was listed on the National Register of Historic Places in 2005.

== See also ==
- National Register of Historic Places listings in Northampton County, Virginia
