= Mignon Holland Anderson =

American writer

- Born: 1945 (age 80–81)
- Occupations: Writer; Professor

Academic background
- Education: Fisk University; Columbia University

Academic work
- Discipline: English
- Institutions: University of Maryland Eastern Shore

Mignon Holland Anderson (born 1945) is an American writer and professor. She writes mainly short stories that focus on African-American life in the Eastern Shore of Virginia.

== Personal life ==
Mignon Holland Anderson was born in Cheriton, Virginia. Her parents, Frank and Ruby Holland, owned a funeral home. She attended Fisk University and received her Bachelor of Arts in 1966. In 1970 she graduated from Columbia University with a Master of Fine Arts. She once served as research assistant to Arna Bontemps.

== Career ==
Anderson writes short stories. Many of her stories take place in the Eastern Shore of Virginia and focus on the lives of African Americans. Her story Mostly Womenfolk and a Man or Two, takes place after the end of slavery in the United States and focuses on how African-American people started appropriating white culture. Her other story, The End of Dying, was published in 2001 and also focuses on racism in the mid-20th century.

Anderson teaches English at the University of Maryland Eastern Shore, a historically black college.

Anderson has been the recipient of the University of Maryland Eastern Shore President's Teacher of the Year award. She has also been named one of the President's Top Ten Teachers of the Year. She has been the associate editor for the Maryland Review.

== Works ==
- The End of Dying. Baltimore: American House (2001).
- "In the Face of Fire I Will Not Turn Back." Negro Digest: 17 (1968), pp. 20–23.
- Mostly Womenfolk and a Man or Two: A Collection. Chicago: Third World Press (1976). ISBN 0-88378-075-5.
