= Henry Wise Jr. =

Tuskegee Airman and physician (1920–2003)

- Born: Henry Alphonso Wise Jr. May 26, 1920; Cheriton, Virginia, United States
- Died: May 2, 2003 (aged 82); Cheverly, Maryland, United States
- Military career
- Allegiance: United States
- Branch: United States Army Air Forces
- Service years: 1942–1946
- Rank: Second Lieutenant
- Units: 99th Pursuit Squadron, 332nd Division, Tuskegee Airmen
- Conflicts: World War II
- Awards: Purple Heart; Air Medal; Congressional Gold Medal awarded to the Tuskegee Airmen; Certificate of Valor for Courage; Tuskegee Airmen Pioneer Award

Henry A. Wise Jr. (May 26, 1920 – May 2, 2003) (POW) was an American physician and World War II Tuskegee Airman fighter pilot with the 99th Pursuit Squadron, 332nd FG. He was shot down over Serbia and was a prisoner of war. After the war, he became the medical director at Bowie State University.

== Early life ==
Wise was born in Cheriton, Virginia, and he graduated from the all black private school, Virginia Union University.

== Career ==
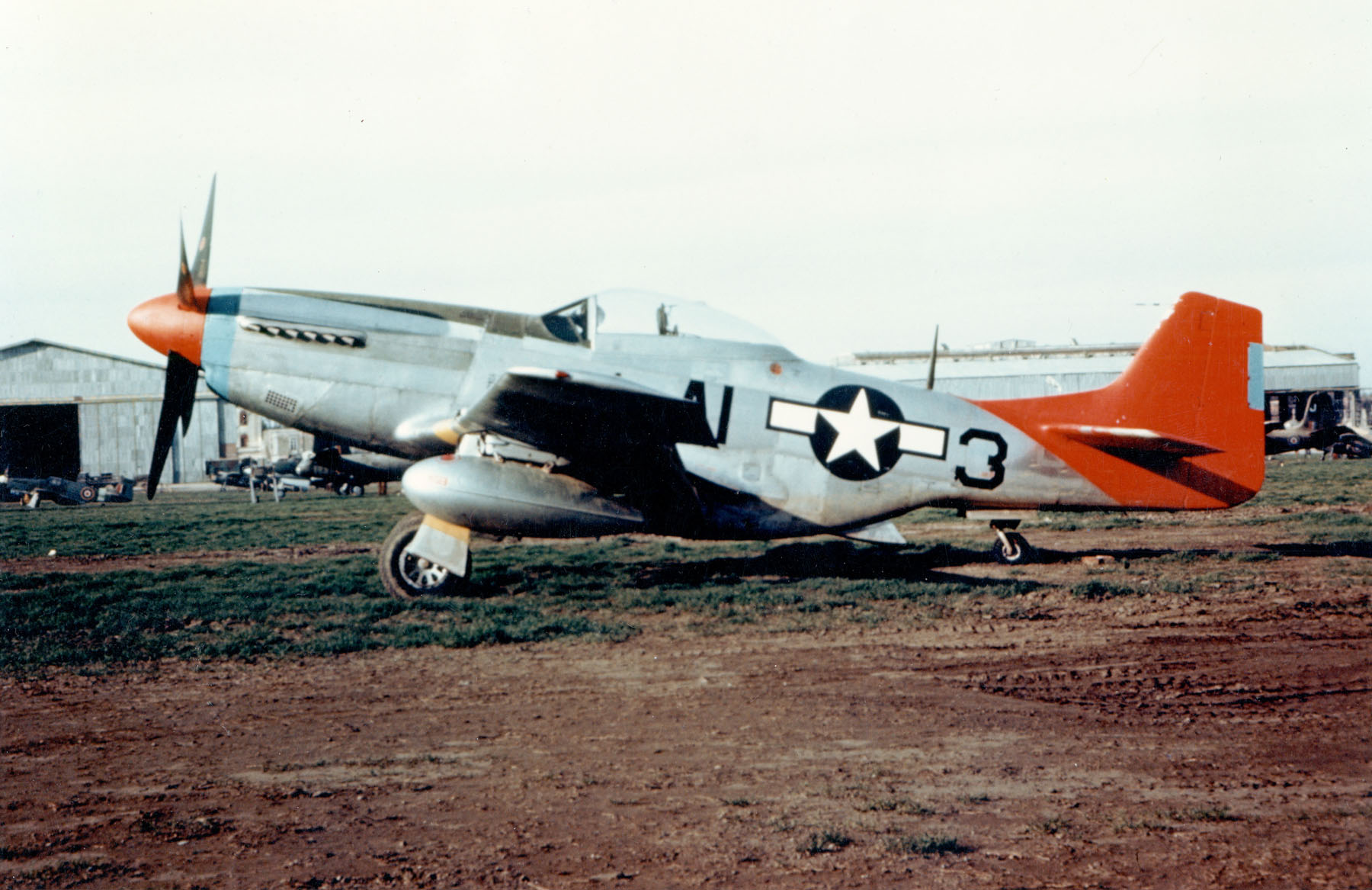
The Tuskegee Airmen's aircraft had distinctive markings that led to the name, "Red Tails". (Note: The red markings that distinguished the Tuskegee Airmen included red bands on the noses of P-51s as well as a red rudder; their P-51B and D Mustangs flew with similar color schemes, with red propeller spinners, yellow wing bands and all-red tail surfaces.)

From 1942 to 1946 served as a pilot in the 15th AF assigned to the 332nd FG / 99th FS. Wise's plane crashed near Babušnica, Serbia on 26 August 1944 when his P-51C suffered engine failure (low oil pressure and smoking badly). He spent three week as a prisoner of war.

In 1955 Wise left his family practice to work as a physician at Prince George's Hospital Center. At that time Wise was the only African American physician. He went on to become the medical director at Bowie State University

Dr. Henry A. Wise Jr. High School was approved by the Board of Education for Prince George's County Public Schools in 2005.

== Death ==
Wise suffered a heart attack and died at Prince George's Hospital Center on May 2, 2003.

== Awards ==
- Air Medal
- Certificate of Valor for Courage in Combat
- Congressional Gold Medal awarded to the Tuskegee Airmen in 2006
- Pioneer Award for Distinguished Service and Historic Achievement.
- Purple Heart

== See also ==
- Dogfights (TV series)
- Executive Order 9981
- List of Tuskegee Airmen
- Military history of African Americans
- The Tuskegee Airmen (movie)
