= Somers House =

Former historic house in Virginia, United States

- Formerly listed on the U.S. National Register of Historic Places
- Virginia Landmarks Register
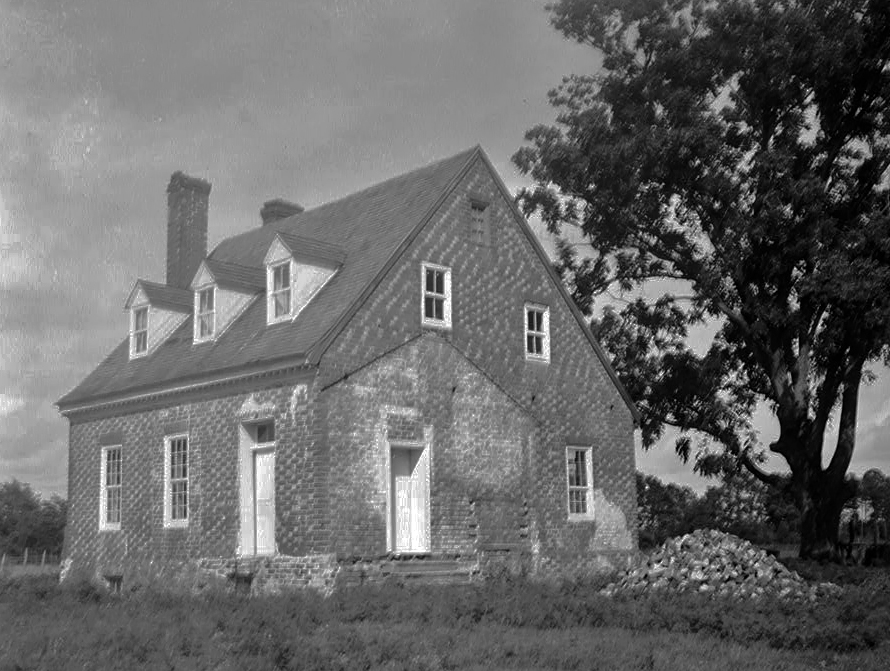
- HABS image of the Somers House
- Location: VA 630, near Jamesville, Virginia
- Area: 205 acres (83 ha)
- Architectural style: Virginia Colonial
- NRHP reference No.: 70000818
- VLR No.: 065-0023

Significant dates
- Added to NRHP: May 26, 1970
- Designated VLR: December 2, 1969
- Removed from NRHP: June 10, 2005
- Delisted VLR: June 19, 2008

Somers House was a historic home located near Jamesville, Northampton County, Virginia. It was built after 1727, and was a 1 1/2-story, rectangular brick structure covered by a steep gable roof with dormers. It was demolished.

It was listed on the National Register of Historic Places in 1970 and delisted in 2005.
