= Eyre Hall =

Historic house in Virginia, United States

- U.S. National Register of Historic Places
- U.S. National Historic Landmark
- Virginia Landmarks Register
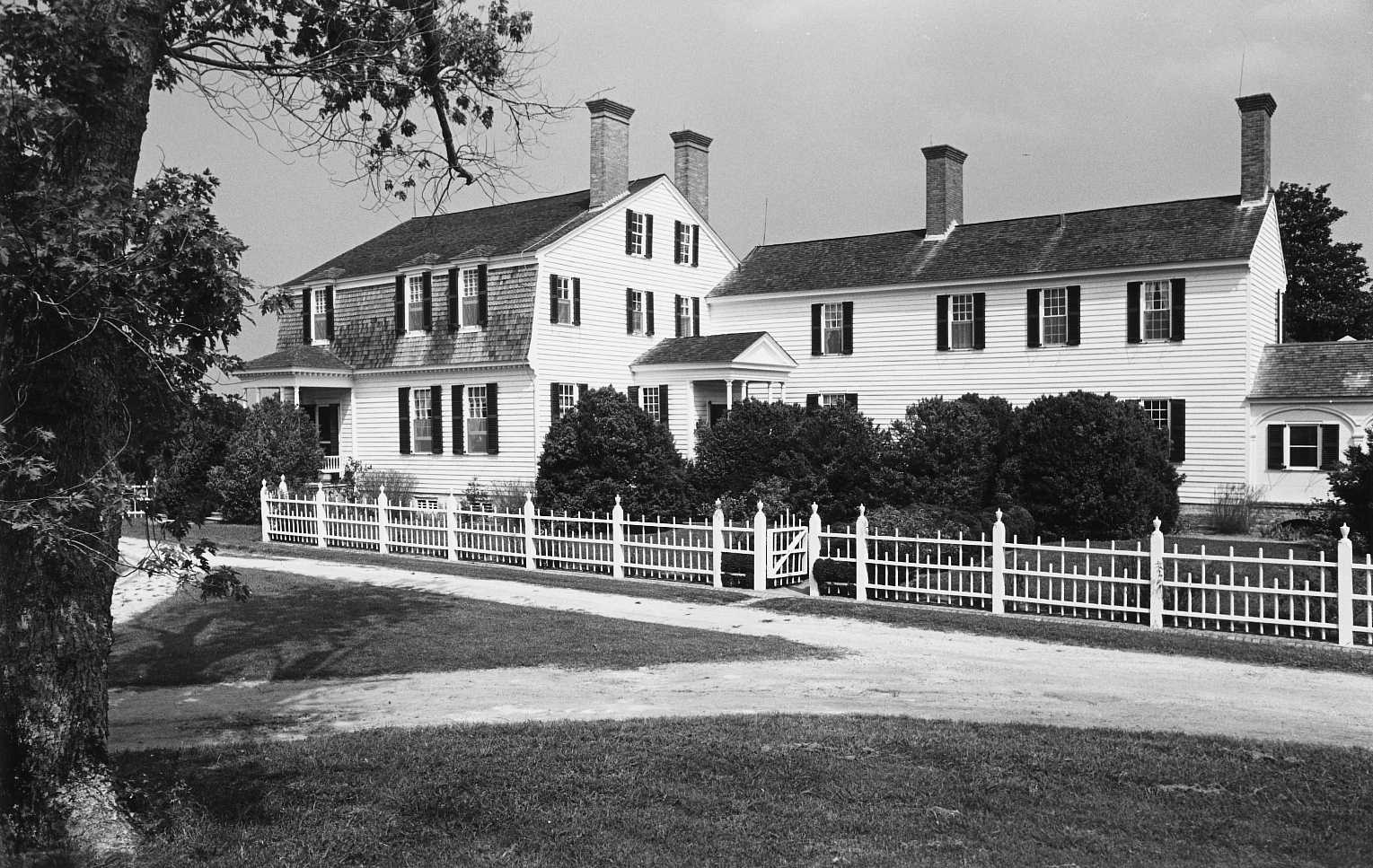
- Eyre Hall

- Location within Virginia Location within the United States
- Nearest city: Cheriton, Virginia
- Coordinates: 37°18′35″N 75°58′29″W
- Area: 1,000 acres (400 ha)
- Built: 1796
- Architectural style: Plantation
- NRHP reference No.: 69000265
- VLR No.: 065-0008

Significant dates
- Added to NRHP: November 12, 1969
- Designated NHL: March 2, 2012
- Designated VLR: September 9, 1969

Eyre Hall is a plantation house located in Northampton, Virginia, close to Cheriton, and owned by the Eyre family since 1668. The property is one of the state's best preserved colonial homes with gardens among the oldest in the United States. The plantation was placed on the National Register on November 12, 1969. It was designated a National Historic Landmark on March 2, 2012.

== History ==
The property where Eyre Hall is located was first patented to the three sons of Thomas Eyre I in 1668 and included 1,600 acres (6.5 km^{2}). A 700-acre (2.8 km^{2}) tract was purchased by Littleton Eyre, a great-grandson of Thomas, in 1754 with the purpose to build a family seat and a working plantation. Eyre reported holding 106 enslaved Africans that year; some of them were moved to the plantation.

The original structure built in 1760 was a 41-foot (12 m)-square structure and was a 2½ story wooden home. The house was expanded, an intermediary section was raised to two stories in 1790 and a two-story unit was added in 1807. The house was modernized in 1930 and included a large kitchen, a breakfast room, and a storage building.

The property grew periodically over the years too, as a dairy was built in 1760 and a smokehouse was built around 1806. The house is surrounded by boxwood gardens, and formal lawns and fields that melt away into the Cherrystone Creek. On the grounds is also a walled garden from the 1800s, the Eyre family cemetery, and the ruins of an orangery from 1819.

Since its origin, 12 generations of the Eyre family have owned the property, several attended the College of William & Mary and served as members of the House of Burgesses. Currently, the estate is owned by H. Furlong Baldwin, a retired Baltimore bank executive and former chairman of Nasdaq who is a descendant of Thomas Eyre.

== Inventory ==
Severn and Margaret Eyre contributed to the consumer revolution of the 18th century, increasing the amount of luxury goods so the family could extend their capacity to engage in a refined manner. The inventory conducted in 1774 inventory mentions two turkey carpets, “Queens china,” “two neat fowling pieces silver mounted,” “1 Violin Bow and Case,” a library with over 300 volumes, and "1 large silver Punch Bowl,” which, valued at thirty pounds, was the most expensive single article of silver included in 1774. This is in all likelihood the supposed Morning Star punch bowl made in London by John Sutton in 1692; an uncommon survival of seventeenth-century residential silver with a Virginia provenance. Eyre family legend dictates that Morning Star, a family racehorse, swallowed champagne from the bowl in the wake of winning a race.

== Interior ==
Eyre Hall renders a culmination of "architectural sophistication and regional preference." Littleton Eyre (1710–1768) may have wished to erect a structure with regards to the conventions of his neighbors yet of a scale that addressed his position and aspirations. Houses of wood outline development with gambrel rooftops were prominent locally and all through the Chesapeake, yet once in a while for the wealthiest of the upper class, who tended to work with brick.

Ann and John Eyre, married in 1800, rolled out unobtrusive however stylish improvements to the house, including supplanting a straightforward bolection chimney shaping in the parlor with a neoclassical chimneypiece highlighting a cut urn and anthemions. To a late eighteenth-century story-and-a-half augmentation, they included an entire second story in 1807 and stretched out the entire to oblige a lounge area, storeroom, and servant's room. A "porch room" with a structural show pantry associated this wing to the first house.

Mirroring the mid nineteenth-century enthusiasm for the sentimental and the fascinating, and also energy for herbal science and agriculture, the Eyres introduced French beautiful backdrop portraying Turkish scenes along the Bosphorus. The backdrop, which later ended up noticeably known as Rives du Bosphore, was planned before 1812 and publicized in the United States by 1817.

== Exterior ==
The house as viewed from its drive is dominated by a large two story wood frame front section with a door on the far left and framed by a portico. The bottom half is white weatherboard with the top covered with dark shingle. The large rectangular windows sit in a pair on each floor, with a window located above the entrance. A pair of large red brick chimneys pierce the roofline on the right.

The next section is offset from the drive and is covered with white weatherboard from top to bottom. Another portico juts from the side of the front section and mirrors the front entrance. A small courtyard lies in front. A door is also located to the right of this back section and is framed by a window to either side with windows in direct line above. Large red brick chimneys pierce the roof in the center and on the far right.

The entire house is set behind a white picket fence the runs its entire facade and perimeter. The dairy is located to the right of the house with the family cemetery and orangery ruins behind.

== See also ==
- List of National Historic Landmarks in Virginia
- National Register of Historic Places listings in Northampton County, Virginia
