= Pear Valley =

Historic house in Virginia, United States

- U.S. National Register of Historic Places
- U.S. National Historic Landmark
- Virginia Landmarks Register
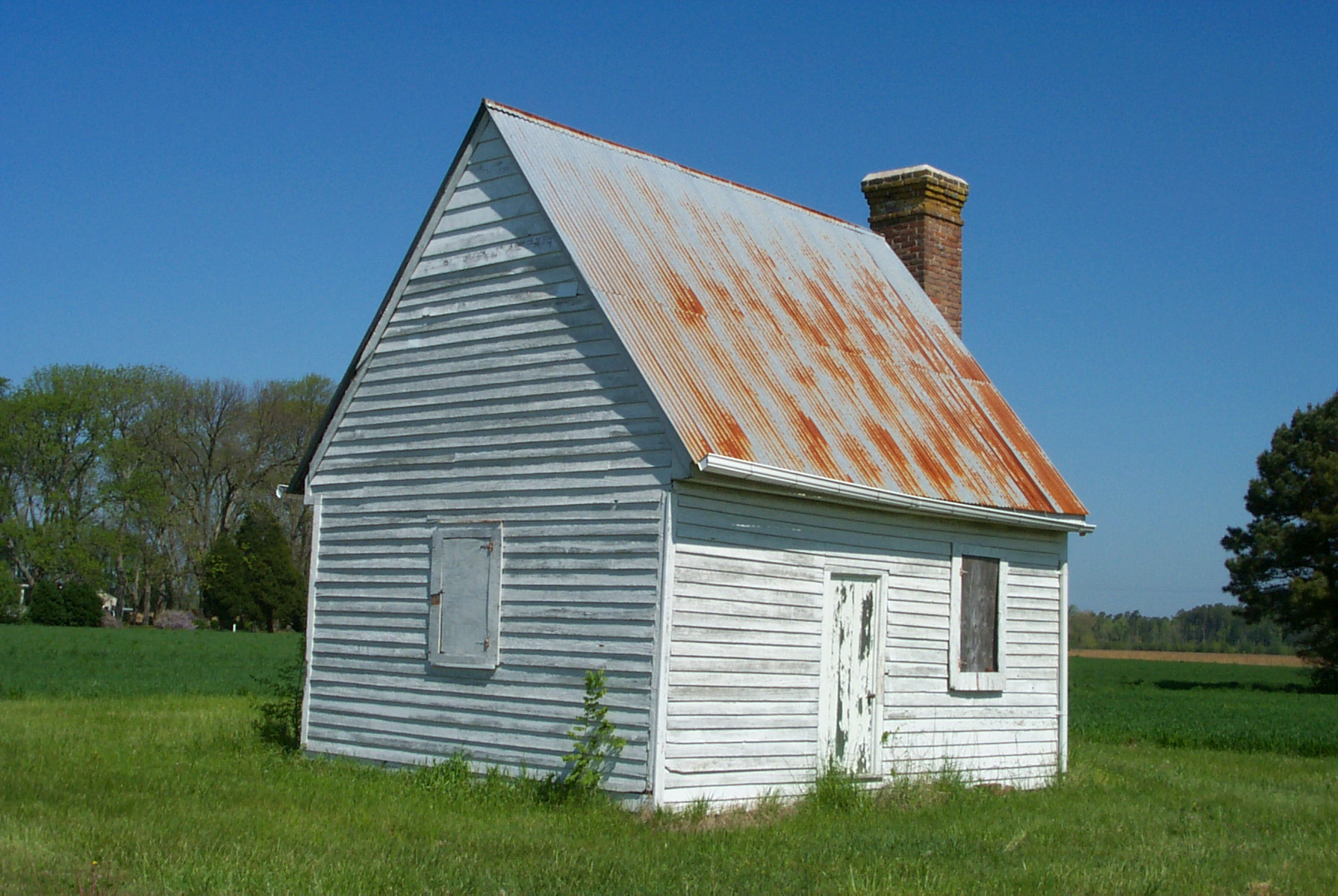
- Pear Valley in Eastville, Virginia

- Location within Virginia Location within the United States
- Nearest city: Eastville, Virginia
- Coordinates: 37°23′48″N 75°55′29″W
- Area: 0 acres (0 ha)
- Architectural style: Medieval Yeoman's Cottage
- NRHP reference No.: 69000266
- VLR No.: 065-0052

Significant dates
- Added to NRHP: November 12, 1969
- Designated NHL: March 11, 2013
- Designated VLR: May 13, 1969

Pear Valley is a one-room yeoman's cottage and an example of vernacular architecture in Eastville, Virginia. Its modest embellishments and high level of preservation make it a notable example of a small, historic homes in Virginia.

== Architecture ==
The house is very typical of early Chesapeake architecture. It is a 1 1/2-story brace-framed structure, clad in weatherboard siding that is largely original, with one wall of brick laid in Flemish bond. Its interior consists of a single chamber with a sleeping loft above. The dwelling is remarkably detailed and impeccably constructed. The owners were presumably slightly more well-off than their near neighbors, but still not wealthy enough to afford a larger, brick building. Distinctive features of the building include a pyramidal chimney and glazed brickwork. Although there used to be controversy surrounding the construction date, Dendrochronology and extensive study place the date between 1720 and 1750. The building underwent a number of alterations in the 19th and early 20th centuries. From the mid-1940s to the mid-1980s the house was little-used, sometimes housing migrant workers, but it was also used for storage, and as a chicken house for a time.

== Preservation ==
Preservation Virginia purchased the property in 1986. They began extensive restoration work, including repairing the foundation, in 1994. The entire roof of the structure was replaced with cedar shingles, as called for by the Historic Structures Report, in 2004. The property was listed on the National Register of Historic Places in 1969, and designated a National Historic Landmark in 2013. On November 13, 2014, Preservation Virginia transferred ownership of Pear Valley to the newly formed Northampton Historic Preservation Society (formerly the 100-year-old Northampton Branch, PVA).

The property is currently open to the public by appointment.

== See also ==
- List of National Historic Landmarks in Virginia
- National Register of Historic Places listings in Northampton County, Virginia
