= Nassawadox, Virginia =

- Town
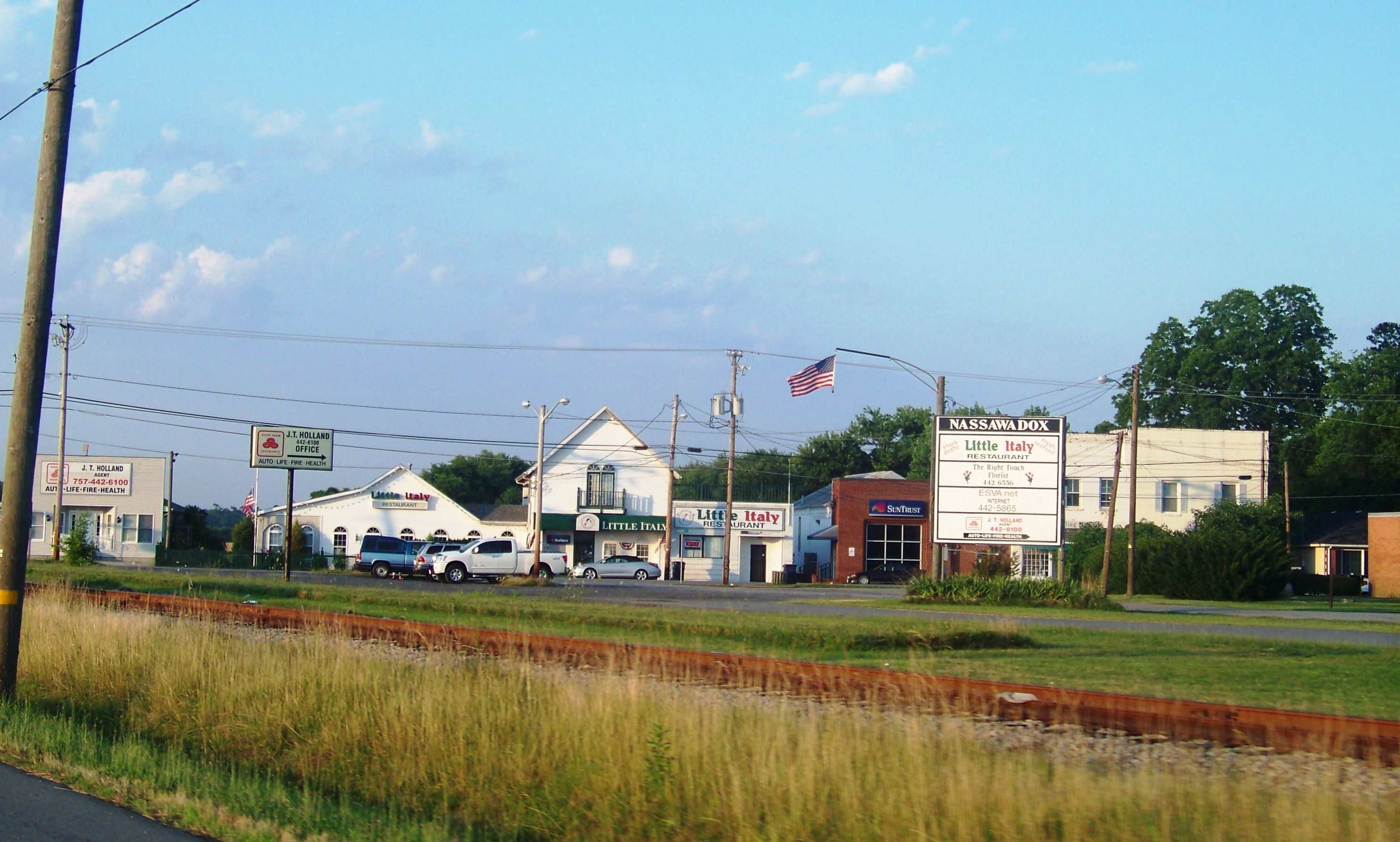

- Location in Northampton County and the state of Virginia.
- Coordinates: 37°28′27″N 75°51′29″W
- Country: United States
- State: Virginia
- County: Northampton

Area
  - Total: 0.66 sq mi (1.72 km^{2})
  - Land: 0.66 sq mi (1.72 km^{2})
  - Water: 0 sq mi (0.00 km^{2})
- Elevation: 36 ft (11 m)

Population (2020)
  - Total: 533
  - Density: 721.8/sq mi (278.68/km^{2})
- Time zone: UTC−5 (Eastern (EST))
  - Summer (DST): UTC−4 (EDT)
- ZIP code: 23413
- Area codes: 757, 948
- FIPS code: 51-54984
- GNIS feature ID: 1471328

Nassawadox is a town in Northampton County, Virginia, United States. Per the 2020 census, the population was 533. The town, with an area of 0.4 square miles (1.0 km^{2}), is located on U.S. Route 13 on Virginia's Eastern Shore, approximately five miles south of Exmore and 25 miles (40 km) north of the Chesapeake Bay Bridge-Tunnel.

== History ==
The name derives from a word from a Native American language that means "land between two waters." Nassawadox is bounded on the east by the Atlantic Ocean and on the west by the Chesapeake Bay. The county is divided, as is the town, into bayside and seaside areas, which refer to the land on either side of the highway, Route 13 (Lankford Highway), which runs through Accomack and Northampton counties.

Highlighting its name and its location, Nassawadox has since 1993 hosted the annual October Between the Waters Bike Tour, which features bike tours of various lengths between the Eastern Shore's two coasts.

Brownsville and the Northampton Lumber Company Historic District are listed on the National Register of Historic Places.

== Demographics ==
Historical population
Census	Pop.	Note	%±
1960	650		—
1970	591		−9.1%
1980	630		6.6%
1990	564		−10.5%
2000	572		1.4%
2010	499		−12.8%
2020	533		6.8%
U.S. Decennial Census; 2010 2020

=== Racial and ethnic composition ===
Nassawadox city, Virginia – Racial and ethnic composition Note: the US Census treats Hispanic/Latino as an ethnic category. This table excludes Latinos from the racial categories and assigns them to a separate category. Hispanics/Latinos may be of any race.
Race / ethnicity (NH = Non-Hispanic)	Pop 2000	Pop 2010	Pop 2020	% 2000	% 2010	% 2020
White alone (NH)	245	269	288	42.83%	53.91%	54.03%
Black or African American alone (NH)	310	204	201	54.20%	40.88%	37.71%
Native American or Alaska Native alone (NH)	0	0	1	0.00%	0.00%	0.19%
Asian alone (NH)	4	1	3	0.70%	0.20%	0.56%
Native Hawaiian or Pacific Islander alone (NH)	0	0	0	0.00%	0.00%	0.00%
Other race alone (NH)	0	4	1	0.00%	0.80%	0.19%
Mixed race or Multiracial (NH)	6	7	6	1.05%	1.40%	1.13%
Hispanic or Latino (any race)	7	14	33	1.22%	2.81%	6.19%
Total	572	499	533	100.00%	100.00%	100.00%

=== 2000 Census ===
As of the census of 2000, there were 572 people, 186 households, and 121 families living in the town. The population density was 1,334.2 people per square mile (513.6/km^{2}). There were 207 housing units at an average density of 482.8 per square mile (185.9/km^{2}). The racial makeup of the town was 54.90% African American, 43.18% White, 0.87% Asian, and 1.05% from two or more races. Hispanic or Latino of any race were 1.22% of the population.

There were 186 households, out of which 23.1% had children under the age of 18 living with them, 39.8% were married couples living together, 22.0% had a female householder with no husband present, and 34.9% were non-families. 31.2% of all households were made up of individuals, and 21.0% had someone living alone who was 65 years of age or older. The average household size was 2.33 and the average family size was 2.93.

In the town, the population was spread out, with 19.2% under the age of 18, 5.8% from 18 to 24, 14.7% from 25 to 44, 19.4% from 45 to 64, and 40.9% who were 65 years of age or older. The median age was 54 years. For every 100 females, there were 81.0 males. For every 100 females aged 18 and over, there were 69.2 males.

The median income for a household in the town was $21,250, and the median income for a family was $27,500. Males had a median income of $25,000 versus $23,594 for females. The per capita income for the town was $14,626. About 24.0% of families and 32.8% of the population were below the poverty line, including 44.7% of those under age 18 and 18.9% of those age 65 or over.

== Transportation ==
=== Major highway ===
- US 13

=== Public transportation ===
STAR Transit provides public transit services, linking Nassawadox with Cape Charles, Onley, and other communities in Northampton and Accomack counties on the Eastern Shore.

=== Railroads ===
The Bay Coast Railroad provided Nassawadox with freight rail service until going out of business in 2018.

== Notable people ==
- Arthur "Big Boy" Crudup, bluesman in the 1940s and 1950s
- D. Page Elmore, former member of the Maryland House of Delegates
- Thom Henderson, creator of the popular ARC file format, which is the progenitor of the ZIP file format on computers.
- Ralph Northam, Governor of Virginia
- George van Driem, Dutch linguist
- Conny Van Dyke, actress
- Todd Washington, NFL coach and assistant offensive line coach for the Jacksonville Jaguars; former NFL center for the Tampa Bay Buccaneers and the Houston Texans
- Johnnie Wittig, pitcher in Major League Baseball
- Tyler Webb, Major League Baseball relief pitcher for the St. Louis Cardinals.

== Climate ==
The climate in this area is characterized by hot, humid summers and generally mild to cool winters. According to the Köppen Climate Classification system, Nassawadox has a humid subtropical climate, abbreviated "Cfa" on climate maps.
