= Almshouse Farm at Machipongo =

- U.S. National Register of Historic Places
- Virginia Landmarks Register
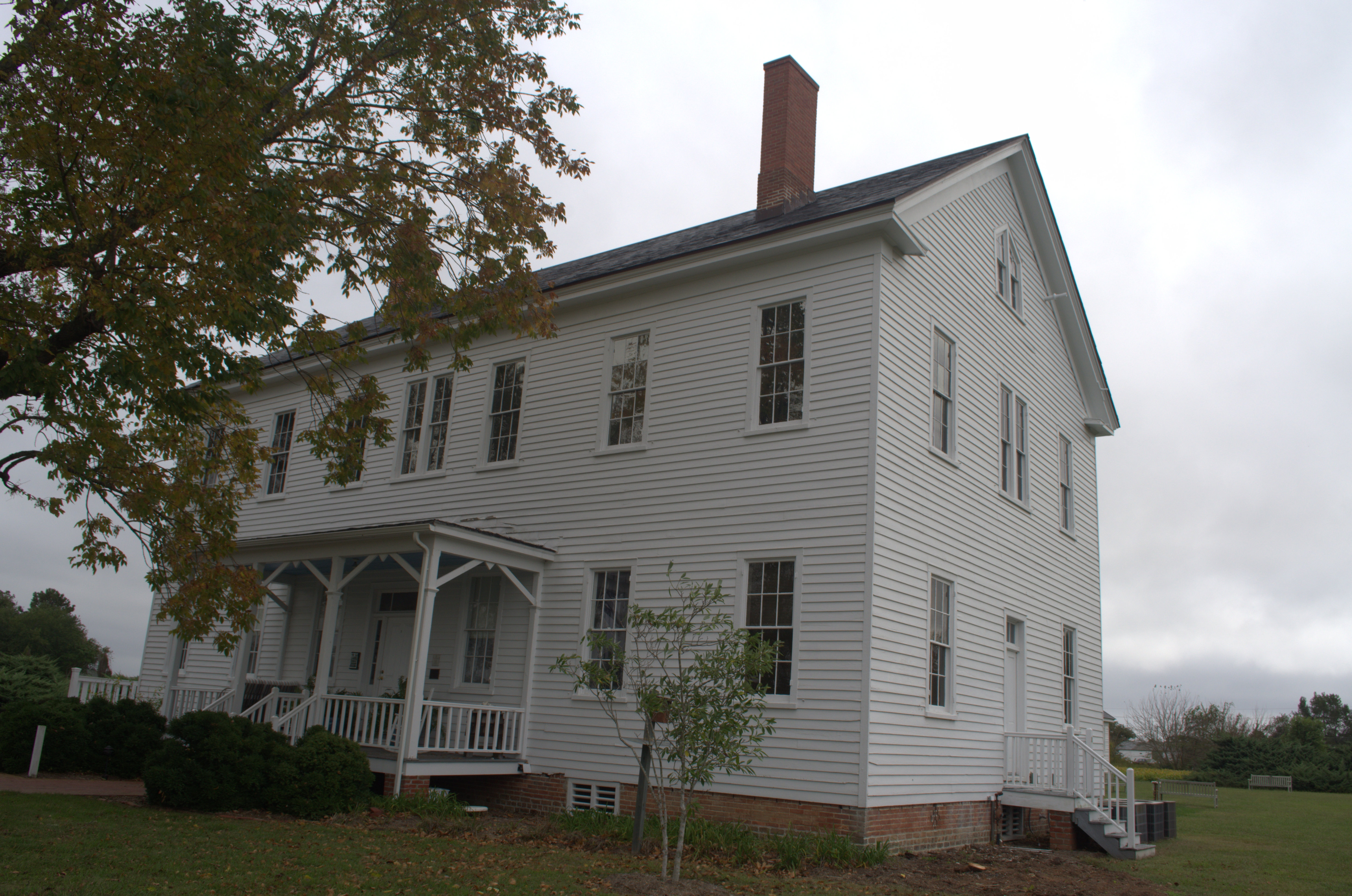

- Location within Virginia Location within the United States
- Location: 12402 Lankford Hwy., Machipongo, Virginia
- Coordinates: 37°24′15″N 75°54′21″W
- Area: 17.9 acres (7.2 ha)
- Built: c. 1725, c. 1840, 1910
- Built by: W.G. Dondelton, David A. Dunton,
- Architectural style: Greek Revival
- NRHP reference No.: 02000317
- VLR No.: 065-0053

Significant dates
- Added to NRHP: April 1, 2002
- Designated VLR: September 12, 2001

Almshouse Farm at Machipongo, now known as the Barrier Islands Center, is a historic almshouse for Northampton County residents. Residents, also known as "inmates", included those sent for unpaid debts but also included homeless people, the mentally ill, orphans and those with diseases like tuberculosis and smallpox. "Inmates" were generally directed by the court to live at the almshouse. The Almshouse Farm served as the site for the Northampton County poorhouse for almost 150 years, from 1804 until 1952. African-Americans were housed in a separate building on the property located at Machipongo, Northampton County, Virginia. The oldest of the three main buildings was built about 1725, and is a 1 1/2-half story structure built in two parts, one brick and one frame, and probably predates the almshouse use of the property. The main building was built about 1840, and is a frame, two-story building in the vernacular Greek Revival style. It housed residents of the almshouse farm. A building dated to 1910, is a one-story frame building in a form resembling that of one-story frame school buildings from the same period and was specifically constructed to separately house African-American residents. There were 10 rooms for the black poor, and no in-house plumbing. This building was renovated in 2013 and now serves as the BIC Education Building. Also on the property are two contributing small, frame, late-19 or early 20th-century outbuildings. The Northampton County Almshouse Farm was in continuous operation between 1803 and 1952.

It was listed on the National Register of Historic Places in 2002.

== Barrier Islands Center ==
The Barrier Islands Center is housed on the former site of the Almshouse Farm. The Center has three main activities, as a local history museum, as an education and enrichment center, and as a community gathering place.

The Barrier Islands Center Museum interprets the culture and history of the people of the Barrier Islands using historic photographs and artifacts.

The Center offers programs, workshops, concerts and events about the arts, culture, nature, science and history for all ages.
