= Silver Beach, Virginia =

Unincorporated community in Northampton County, Virginia, United States

Coordinates: 37°29′07″N 75°57′38″W

Silver Beach is an unincorporated community in Northampton County, Virginia, United States.
