= Brownsville (Nassawadox, Virginia) =

Historic house in Virginia, US

- U.S. National Register of Historic Places
- Virginia Landmarks Register
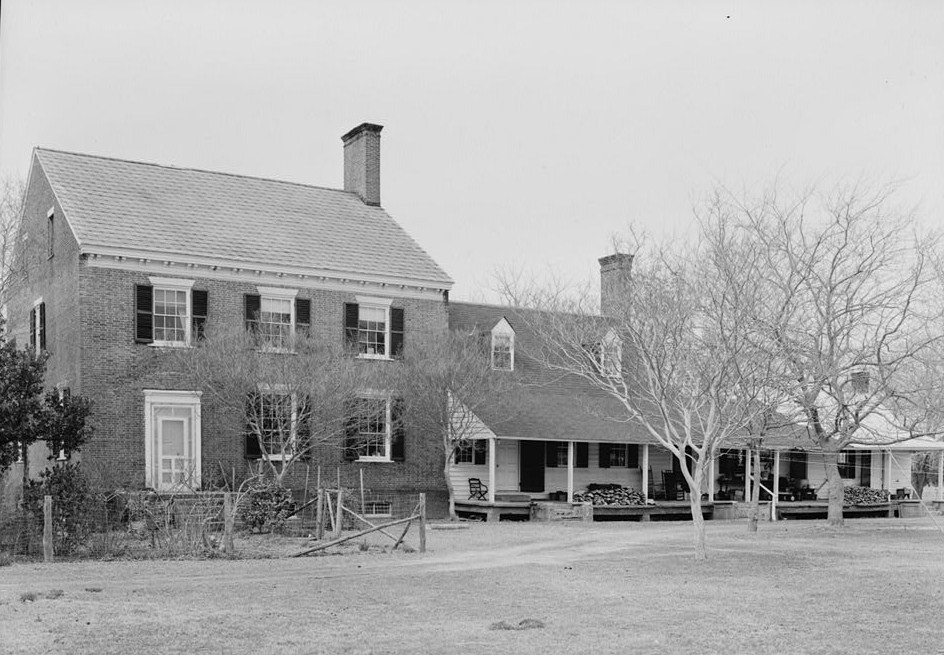
- Brownsville, HABS Photo

- Location within Virginia Location within the United States
- Location: Southwest of the junction of Rtes. 608 and 600, near Nassawadox, Virginia
- Coordinates: 37°28′04″N 75°49′35″W
- Area: 600 acres (240 ha)
- Built: 1806
- Architectural style: Federal
- NRHP reference No.: 70000819
- VLR No.: 065-0003

Significant dates
- Added to NRHP: February 26, 1970
- Designated VLR: December 2, 1969

Brownsville is a historic home located near Nassawadox, Northampton County, Virginia. It was built in 1806, and is a two-story, brick structure with a gable roof and interior end chimney. A 1 1/2-story frame wing was added in 1809. The interior features Federal style woodwork.

According to the Federal Writers' Project, a prehistoric Indigenous village once stood here.

Brownsville was listed on the National Register of Historic Places in 1970.
