= Hungars Church =

Historic church in Virginia, US

- U.S. National Register of Historic Places
- Virginia Landmarks Register
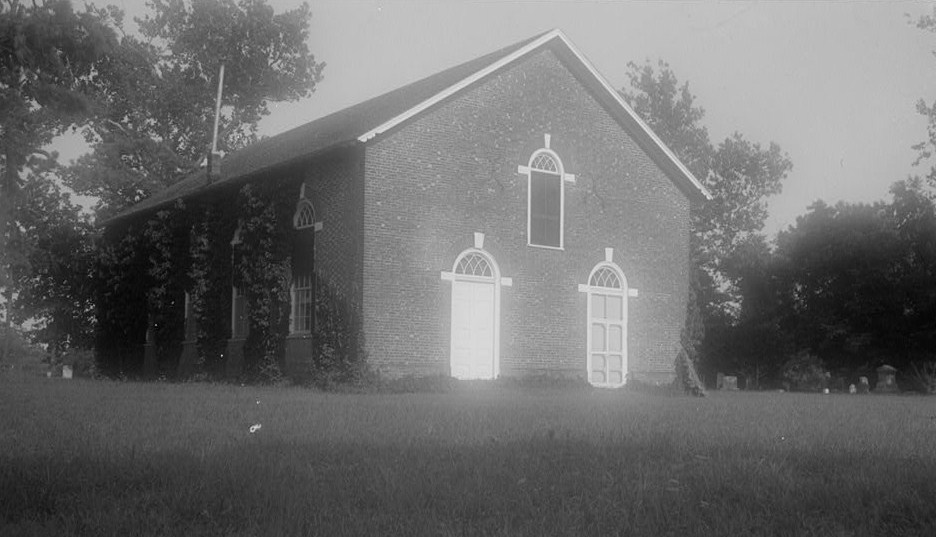
- Hungar's Church, HABS Photo

- Location within Virginia Location within the United States
- Location: E of jct. of Rtes. 619 and 622, Bridgetown, Virginia
- Coordinates: 37°26′46″N 75°55′27″W
- Area: 3 acres (1.2 ha)
- Built: 1742–1751, 1851, 1922
- Architectural style: Colonial
- NRHP reference No.: 70000813
- VLR No.: 065-0012

Significant dates
- Added to NRHP: October 15, 1970
- Designated VLR: July 7, 1970

Hungars Church, also known as Hungars Parish Church, is a historic Episcopal church located at Bridgetown, Northampton County, Virginia. Since 1828, when an additional church was constructed about nine miles away in Eastville (which is now also one of the oldest churches on Virginia's Eastern Shore), the parish has had two churches.

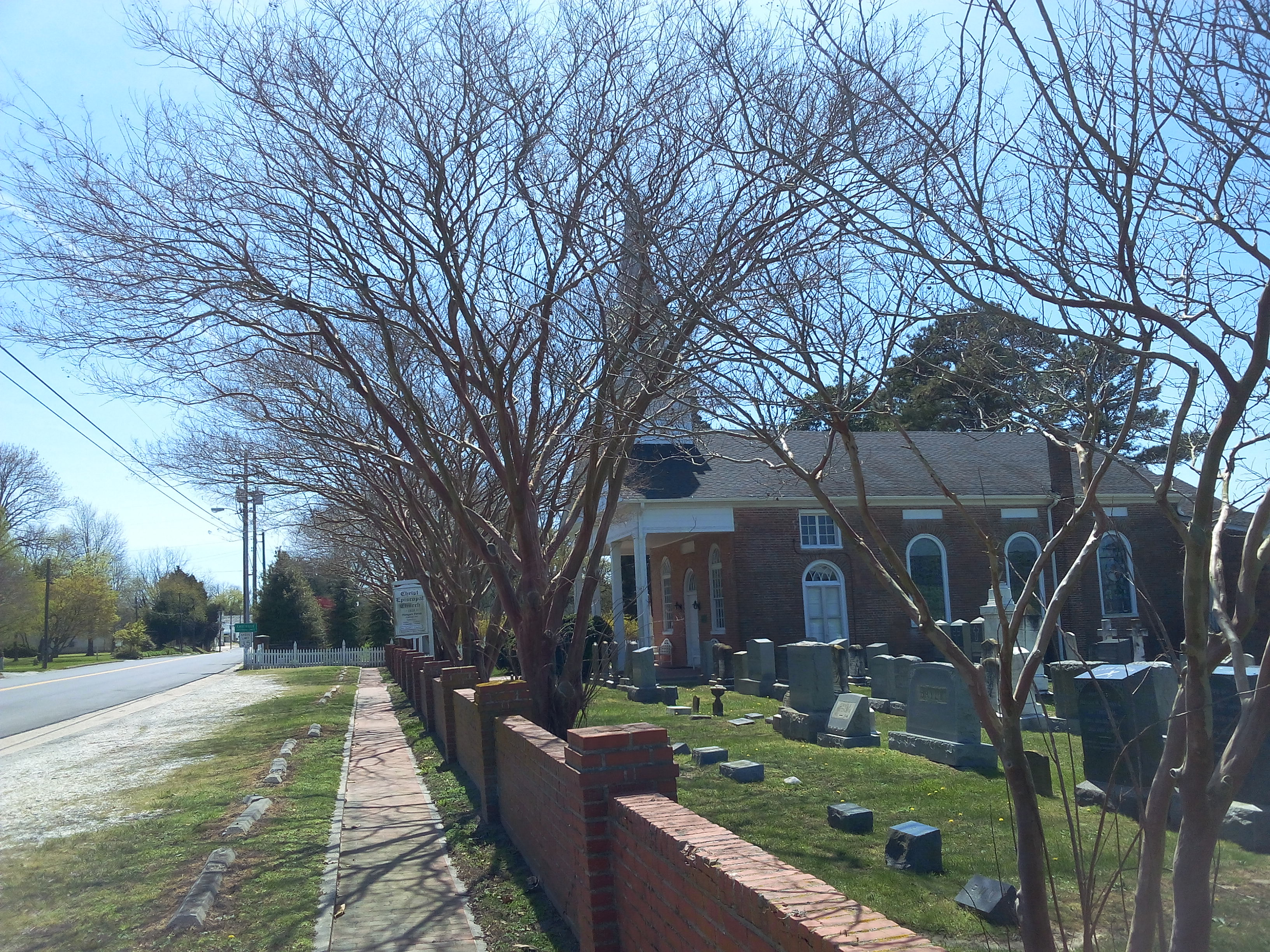
Christ Church Eastville on road from Northampton Courthouse

== History ==
Accawmake Kingdome was the original homeland of the American Indigenous Accawmacke Indians. They had a flourishing settlement of small towns before the English immigrants arrived. Those colonists established Accomack Shire as one of the eight original shires, and included what later became Accomack and Northampton counties on the Delmarva Peninsula. The first assigned clergyman was Rev. Francis Bolton. This land was patented (claimed) by Rev. John Cotton, who farmed as well as served as the parish's second rector, from about 1632 to 1645. In that year, vestryman Robert Vaughn died and bequeathed tobacco toward construction of a church which became known as Nussawattocks Church. Northampton County was organized into two parishes divided by King's Creek in 1642, and in 1663 Accomac Parish was split off from the northern part of Hungar's Parish. In 1690, Nassawattocks Parish was merged into Hungar's Parish, and Eastville became the seat of Northampton county. Meanwhile, a wooden church was built at what was then called Church Neck by Magothy Bay.

In 1653 a wealthy vestryman who had some prior disagreements with Rev. Cotton, Stephen Charlton, gave land for a glebe to support the minister, and may have given additional funds to build a church. When he died two years later, his will provided that the church would receive his estate if his daughters died. Since one was married at 12 years of age and soon died in childbirth, litigation occurred, and again after disestablishment of the Episcopal Church circa 1808. The Glebe of Hungar's Parish remained the official residence of the parish's ministers from 1745 until 1850, although it was sold at auction after disestablishment conditioned upon the litigation results; the last rector to live at the glebe was Rev. Francis Upton, who served until 1850.

In 1679, a contract was entered into for a 40-foot-long wooden church at the Hungars site, although Maj. William Spencer did not give the parish title to the land until 1684. Since 1690, the parish has had the same boundaries as Northampton county; Mr. John Monroe became the minister the following year.

The current building is the third parish church of Hungars Parish. It may have been built in 1742, perhaps as a result of a ferry to York and Hampton being located nearby since 1731, and was the second largest in Virginia before the Revolutionary war. A will in 1759 referred to a new church on Hungar's Creek. The disestablishment of the Episcopal Church circa 1802 led to the abandonment of both the Magothy and Hungars chapels, which were stripped. Remaining parishioners met at the county's courthouse in Eastville, and the parish preserved the alms basin given the Magothy Bay church by Lt. Gov. Nicholson circa 1690, as well as the 1741 communion silver given Hungars Church by John Custis (father-in-law of Martha Dandridge's first husband, she later married George Washington). Hungars Church was resurrected in 1819 as some prosperity returned to the area, but the ferry now had competition, a ferry to Pungoteague, i.e. the part that split off into Accomack Parish. Around the time Hungars parish lost the glebe as rector's residence, Hungars church was reported unsafe. It was renovated in 1851 by a contractor from further up the peninsula in Snow Hill, Maryland and physically shortened (from 92 feet in length, to about 74 feet) as well as having the balcony (seating for non-pew-holders, including slaves) redone.

In 1884, the New York, Philadelphia and Norfolk Railroad was built down the Delmarva peninsula to Cape Charles, Virginia. Its wealthy and politically connected developer, William Lawrence Scott, hired an engineer from Pocomoke City, Maryland to lay it out. The railroad, which helped the area economically and may have led to the parish's greatest prosperity (before World War I), included Eastville Station, not far from the existing town, and its terminus was close to the historic Hungars Church (although several churches, including Emmanuel Episcopal Church, as well as Presbyterian, Methodist, Baptist and Catholic churches, were soon built within Cape Charles). Hungars parish was able to afford additional renovations to Hungars Church in 1892 (adding the current gallery as well as stove flues), 1922 (oak floor), and then in 1950 and 1955 (lighting, central heat, brick floor in vestibule), 1985 (air conditioning) and 1991–1992 (pulpit, wood renovation). However, ending of both railroad passenger service in 1958 and ferry service in over forty years ago has led to some stagnation, as well as development as tourist attractions.

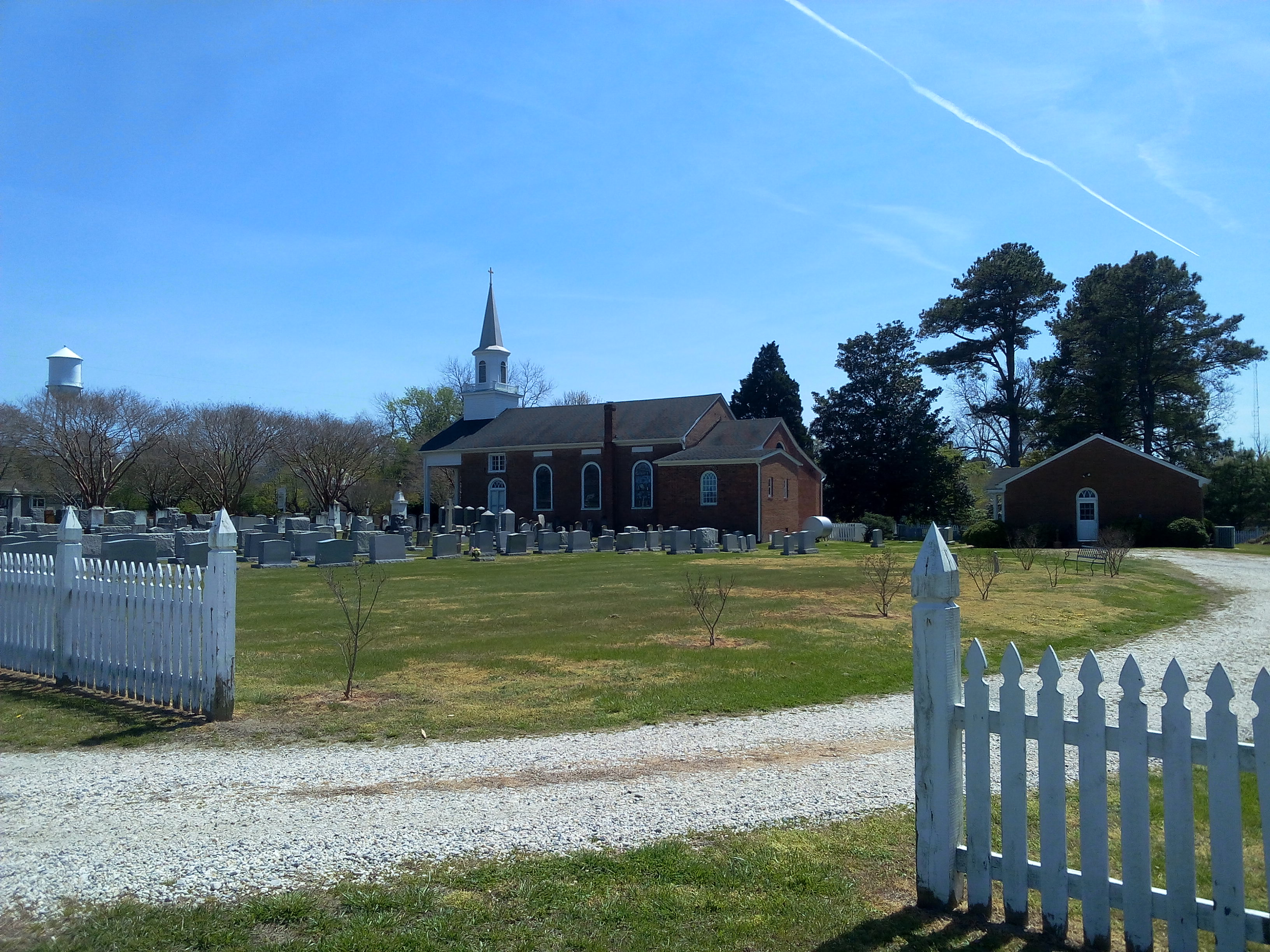
Christ Church Eastville, with cemetery and Hungars Parish Hall

Meanwhile, another church was built at Eastville (current address 16304 Courthouse Rd.) in 1828, which replaced the Magothy church. Christ Church was built on land given by Severn E. Parker of Kendall Grove, although the deed was not recorded in his lifetime, but by his daughter. Bequests and memorials led to the installation of stained glass windows in the late 19th and early 20th centuries, and they were renovated in 1992. The baroque pipe organ was donated in 1986. In 1974, Robert S. and Ellen B. Trower donated the adjacent land upon which the parish hall was built. Christ Episcopal Church in Eastville is considered a Virginia Historic Landmark (DHR-ID:214-0040-0055), as well as one of 315 contributing properties in the Eastville Historical District, which achieved both federal and state recognition in 2009. The current rectory (for both churches in the parish) was acquired in 1985, and is about a half mile south of Christ Church, Eastville.

== Architecture ==
According to the historic survey, the building was built between 1742 and 1751, and is a one-story, brick, Colonial structure with four-bay north and south facades, two-bay end walls, and a gable roof with modillioned cornice. The building was shortened in 1851, and the cornice, roof, and floor may date from 1922.

== Current status ==
The parish remains active in the Episcopal Diocese of Southern Virginia. The Hungars Church building was listed on the National Register of Historic Places in 1970. Neither church was included in the Cape Charles Historic District in 1991. However, the Eastville Historical District containing Christ Church was added to the National Register in 2009. The Rev. Daniel Lee Crockett currently serves as rector of both Hungars Cure churches; the parish's administrative offices are next to Christ Church in Eastville.
