= Grapeland (Wardtown, Virginia) =

Historic house in Virginia, United States

- U.S. National Register of Historic Places
- Virginia Landmarks Register
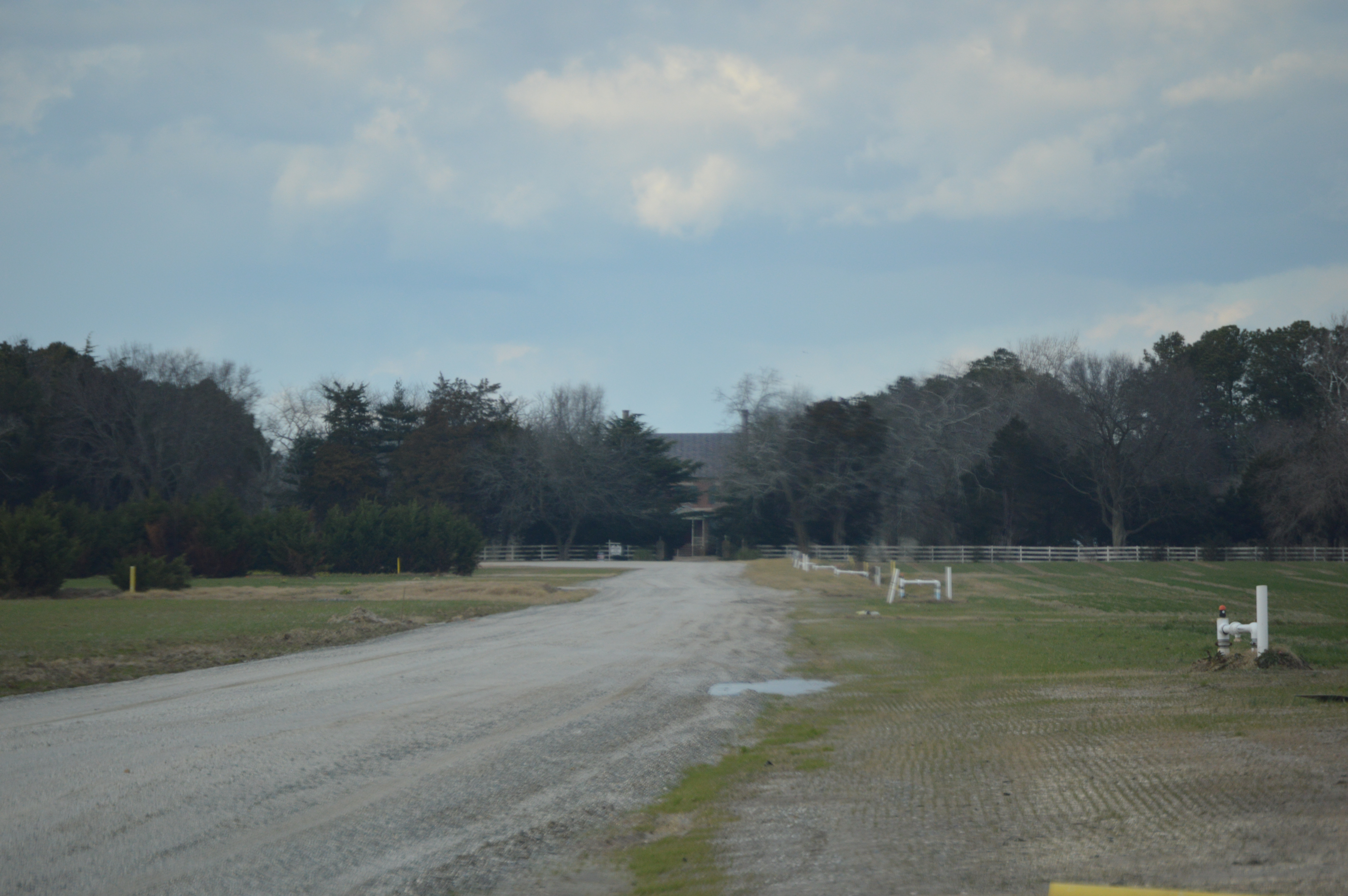
- Driveway view

- Location within Virginia Location within the United States
- Location: Grapeland Circle, north of Wardtown, near Wardtown, Virginia
- Coordinates: 37°32′40″N 75°52′55″W
- Area: 14 acres (5.7 ha)
- Built: c. 1825
- Architectural style: Federal, Victorian
- NRHP reference No.: 80004207
- VLR No.: 065-0035

Significant dates
- Added to NRHP: May 6, 1980
- Designated VLR: June 21, 1977

Grapeland is a historic plantation home near Wardtown, Virginia. It was built about 1825, and is a two-story, three-bay, gable-roofed, Federal style brick house. It has a one-story, brick wing added in the mid-19th century. Also on the property are the contributing four-bay, frame kitchen building with a central chimney and an early 19th-century frame stable.

It was listed on the National Register of Historic Places in 1980.
