= Benjamin's Department Store =

Historic commercial building in Virginia, United States

- U.S. National Register of Historic Places
- Virginia Landmarks Register
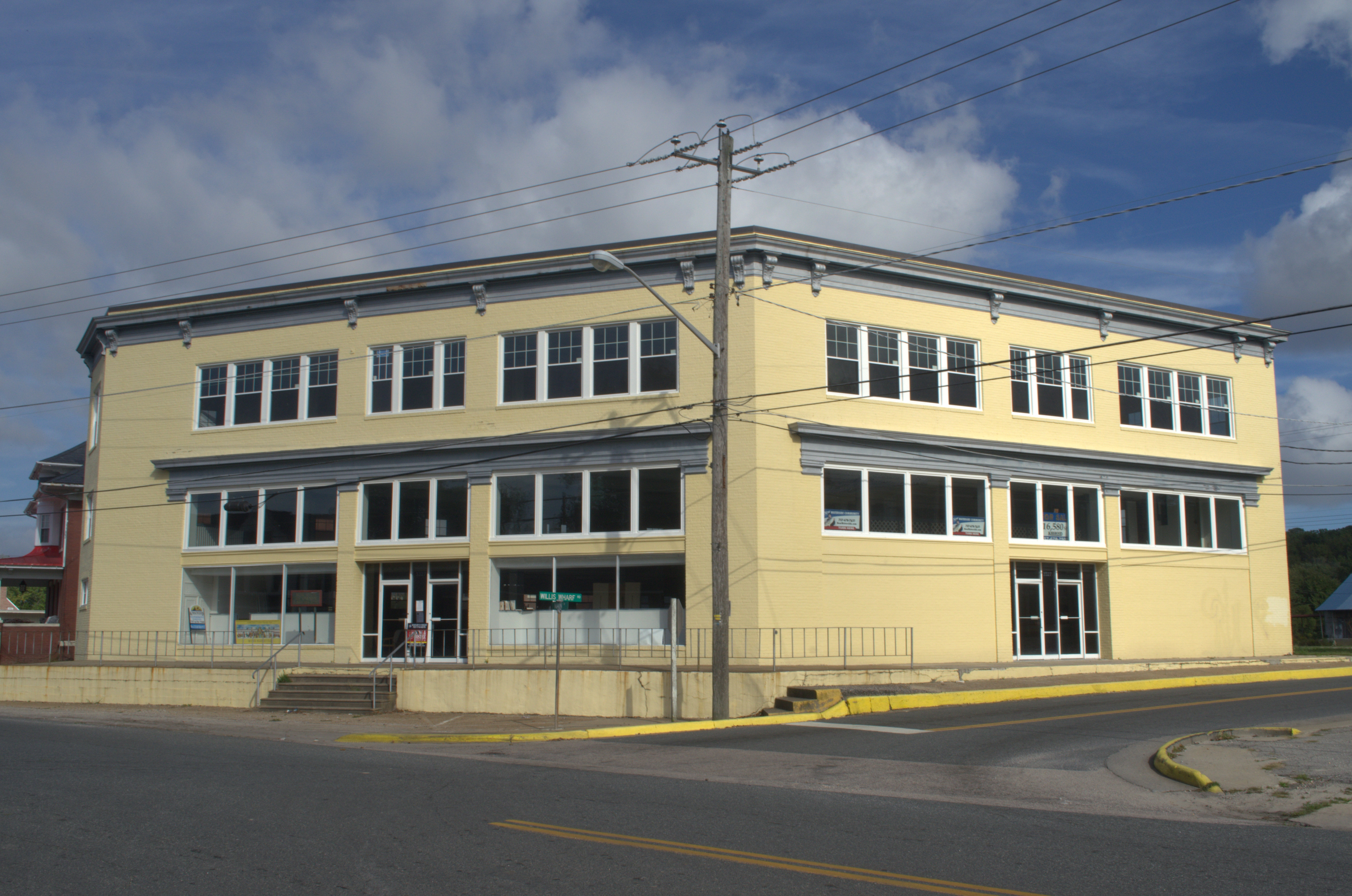
- Building in 2013

- Location within Virginia Location within the United States
- Location: 3327 Main St., Exmore, Virginia
- Coordinates: 37°32′1″N 75°49′20″W
- Area: 0.2 acres (0.081 ha)
- Built: c. 1910
- Built by: Chandler, John W.
- Architectural style: Italianate
- NRHP reference No.: 06000367
- VLR No.: 217-0007

Significant dates
- Added to NRHP: May 10, 2006
- Designated VLR: March 8, 2006

Benjamin's Department Store, also known as Peebles Department Store, is a historic commercial building located at Exmore, Northampton County, Virginia. It was built about 1910, and is a three-story, brick building in the Italianate style located at the most prominent corner at the core of the town. It features a metal cornice and storefronts on the west and south elevations.

It was listed on the National Register of Historic Places in 2006.
