= Westover–Bacon–Potts Farm =

- U.S. National Register of Historic Places
- U.S. Historic district
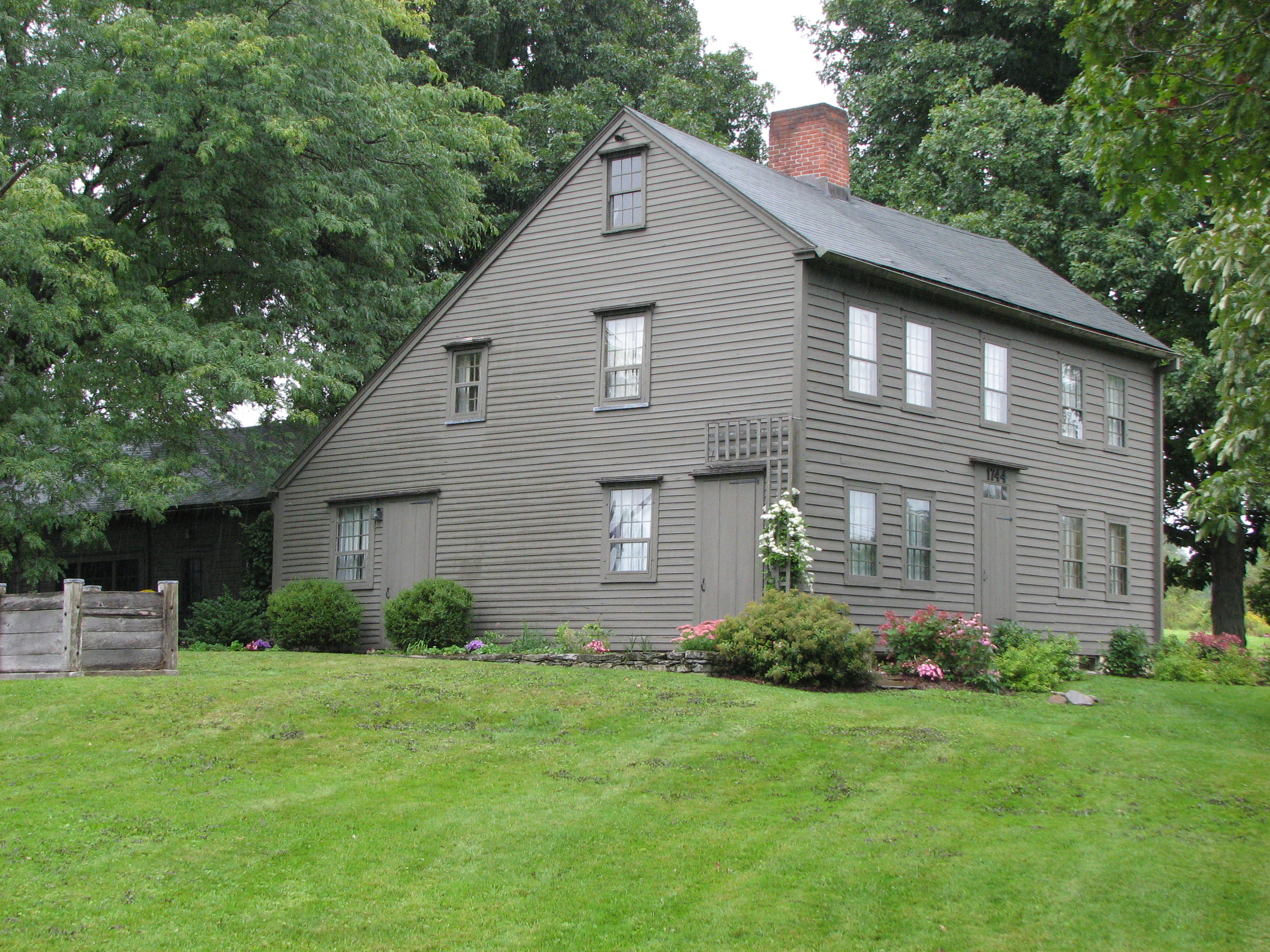
- South elevation, east profile, 2014

- Location within Massachusetts Location within the United States
- Location: 62 Undermountain Rd., Egremont, Massachusetts
- Coordinates: 42°8′53″N 73°25′1″W
- Area: 150 acres (61 ha)
- Built: 1744
- Architectural style: Georgian
- NRHP reference No.: 90000157
- Added to NRHP: July 27, 1990

The Westover–Bacon–Potts Farm is a historic farm along Massachusetts Route 41 in Egremont, Massachusetts. Built beginning in 1744 on 150 acres (61 ha) of land, it is one of the best-preserved farmsteads of the period in Berkshire County. It was listed on the National Register of Historic Places in 1990. Until 2019, the property was owned by the Appalachian Trail Conservancy and was named the Kellogg Conservation Center. In 2019, Greenagers acquired the property "for a nominal sum" and renamed it the April Hill Conservation & Education Center.

== Description and history ==
The Westover–Bacon–Potts Farm is located in a rural setting of southeastern Egremont, on 150 acres (61 ha) roughly bisected by Undermountain Road, bounded on the north by Warner Road and the south by the right-of-way of the Appalachian Trail. The farmstead is located on the west side of the road, with the farmhouse facing east. It is a 2 1/2-story wood-frame structure, with a gabled roof, central chimney, and clapboarded exterior. The rear roof face extends to the first floor, giving the house a classic saltbox profile. The house is accompanied by several 19th-century farm outbuildings, as well as a 20th-century garage.

Land for the farm was purchased in 1744 by Jonah Westover, who built the house that now stands on the property. In the 1790s the property was purchased by Elijah Bacon, in whose family it remained until 1965. In the intervening years little was done to modernize the house. The 1965 purchasers, Helen and Joseph D. McGoldrick, were antique dealers with connections in the historic preservation community, and made some modernization of the property, sensitive to its historic integrity. Later owners have continued the practice of sensitive updating to the house, which remains one of the best-preserved 2 1/2-story houses in Egremont.

Mary-Margaret Kellogg in 2004 donated her home "April Hill" and 95 acres to the Appalachian Trail Conservancy (ATC). Until 2019, the property served as the regional offices of the ATC and the Appalachian Mountain Club.

In 2019, Greenagers, a local nonprofit "providing paid jobs and environmental education for teens and young adults," acquired the building and 100 acres of land. The house and the surrounding four acres are under an historic preservation restriction held by Historic New England. 150 acres of surrounding land are protected by agricultural and conservation restrictions held by the Appalachian Trail Conservancy.

== See also ==
- National Register of Historic Places listings in Berkshire County, Massachusetts
