= Glebe of Hungar's Parish =

Historic house in Virginia, US

- U.S. National Register of Historic Places
- Virginia Landmarks Register
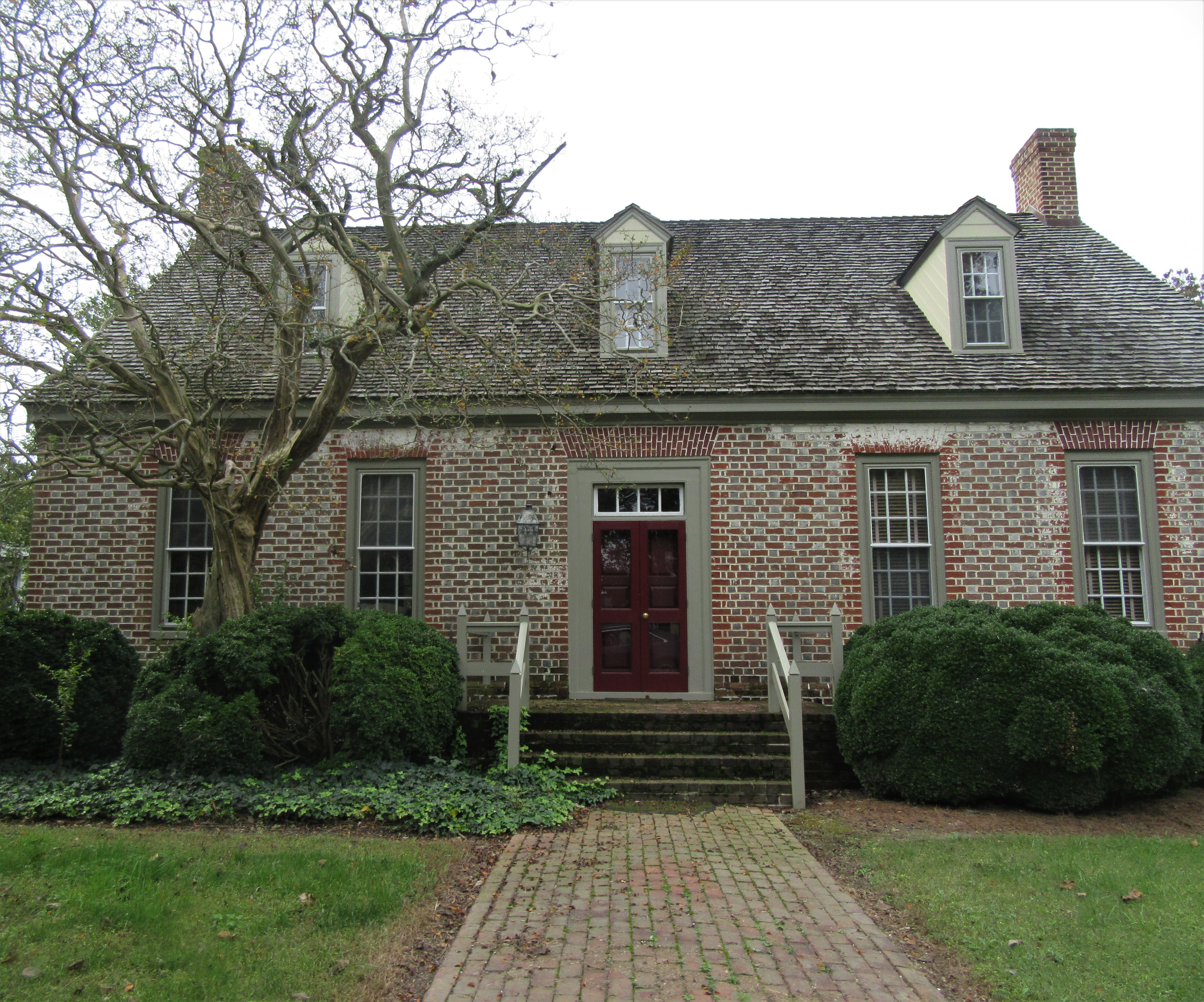

- Location within Virginia Location within the United States
- Location: Northwest of the junction of Rtes. 622 and 619, Franktown, Virginia
- Coordinates: 37°27′36″N 75°57′44″W
- Area: 40.5 acres (16.4 ha)
- NRHP reference No.: 70000817
- VLR No.: 065-0033

Significant dates
- Added to NRHP: February 26, 1970
- Designated VLR: December 2, 1969

Glebe of Hungar's Parish is a historic glebe house located at Franktown, Northampton County, Virginia. It was built sometime between 1643 and 1745, and is a 1 1/2-story, brick, structure with gable roof, dormers, and two interior end chimneys. It was the official residence of the ministers of Hungar's Parish from 1745 until 1850. The Glebe is not actually in Franktown but about 10 miles southwest on the shores of Chesapeake Bay.

It was listed on the National Register of Historic Places in 1970.
