= Cheriton, Virginia =

- Town
- Motto: Small town, big heart
- Location in Northampton County and the state of Virginia.
- Coordinates: 37°17′22″N 75°58′6″W
- Country: United States
- State: Virginia
- County: Northampton
- Named after: Cheriton, Kent

Government
  - Mayor: Jaqueline V. Davis (incumbent)

Area
  - Total: 1.09 sq mi (2.83 km^{2})
  - Land: 1.09 sq mi (2.82 km^{2})
  - Water: 0.0039 sq mi (0.01 km^{2})
- Elevation: 20 ft (6.1 m)

Population (2020)
  - Total: 486
  - Density: 447/sq mi (172.5/km^{2})
- Time zone: UTC−5 (Eastern (EST))
  - Summer (DST): UTC−4 (EDT)
- ZIP code: 23316
- Area codes: 757, 948
- FIPS code: 51-15112
- GNIS feature ID: 1492747
- Website: Official Website

Cheriton is a town in Northampton County, Virginia, United States. The population was 486 at the 2020 census.

== History ==
Eyre Hall was listed on the National Register of Historic Places in 1969. It was designated a National Historic Landmark on March 2, 2012.

== Geography ==
Cheriton is located at 37°17′22″N 75°58′6″W (37.289443, −75.968201). It is situated along U.S. Route 13 at its junction with State Route 184.

According to the United States Census Bureau, the town has a total area of 1.0 square miles (2.7 km^{2}), of which 1.0 square mile (2.7 km^{2}) is land and 0.96% is water.

== Demographics ==
Historical population
Census	Pop.	Note	%±
1960	761		—
1970	655		−13.9%
1980	695		6.1%
1990	515		−25.9%
2000	499		−3.1%
2010	487		−2.4%
2020	486		−0.2%
U.S. Decennial Census

At the 2000 census there were 499 people, 219 households, and 134 families living in the town. The population density was 485.8 people per square mile (187.1/km^{2}). There were 239 housing units at an average density of 232.7 per square mile (89.6/km^{2}). The racial makeup of the town was 71.14% White, 27.45% African American, 1.00% from other races, and 0.40% from two or more races. Hispanic or Latino of any race were 1.60%.

Of the 219 households 22.4% had children under the age of 18 living with them, 45.7% were married couples living together, 11.9% had a female householder with no husband present, and 38.4% were non-families. 36.1% of households were one person and 21.0% were one person aged 65 or older. The average household size was 2.28 and the average family size was 2.90.

The age distribution was 21.8% under the age of 18, 4.6% from 18 to 24, 24.6% from 25 to 44, 25.3% from 45 to 64, and 23.6% 65 or older. The median age was 44 years. For every 100 females, there were 79.5 males. For every 100 females age 18 and over, there were 83.1 males.

The median household income was $26,429 and the median family income was $39,028. Males had a median income of $22,222 versus $16,818 for females. The per capita income for the town was $14,238. About 7.8% of families and 11.9% of the population were below the poverty line, including 8.8% of those under age 18 and 19.5% of those age 65 or over.

== Transportation ==
=== Major highways ===
- US 13
- US 13 Bus.
- SR 184

=== Public transportation ===
STAR Transit provides public transit services, linking Cheriton with Cape Charles, Onley, and other communities in Northampton and Accomack counties on the Eastern Shore.

=== Railroads ===
The Bay Coast Railroad provided Cheriton with freight rail service until going out of business in 2018.

== Notable people ==
- Mignon Holland Anderson, author, born in Cheriton.
- Henry Wise Jr., Tuskegee Airman and physician, born in Cheriton.

== Climate ==
The climate in this area is characterized by hot, humid summers and generally mild to cool winters. According to the Köppen Climate Classification system, Cheriton has a humid subtropical climate, abbreviated "Cfa" on climate maps.
