= Franktown, Virginia =

Unincorporated community in Virginia, US

Coordinates: 37°28′43″N 75°52′44″W

- Census-designated place
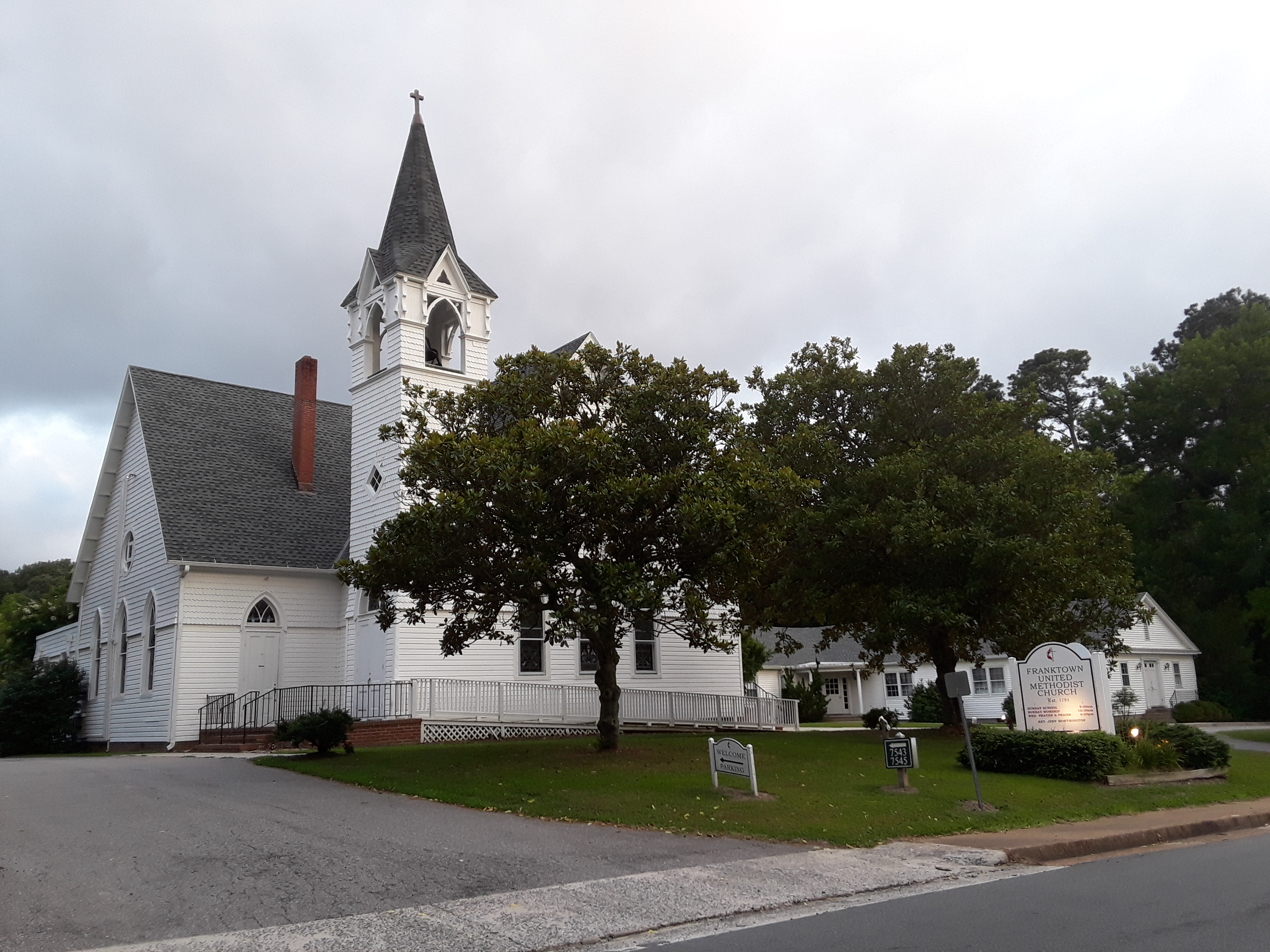
- Franktown United Methodist Church

- Location within Virginia Location within the United States
- Country: United States
- State: Virginia
- County: Northampton
- Elevation: 23 ft (7.0 m)

Population (2020)
  - Total: 61
- Time zone: UTC-5 (Eastern (EST))
  - Summer (DST): UTC-4 (EDT)
- GNIS feature ID: 2807431

Franktown is an unincorporated community and census-designated place in Northampton County, Virginia, United States. It was first listed as a CDP in the 2020 census, with a population of 61.

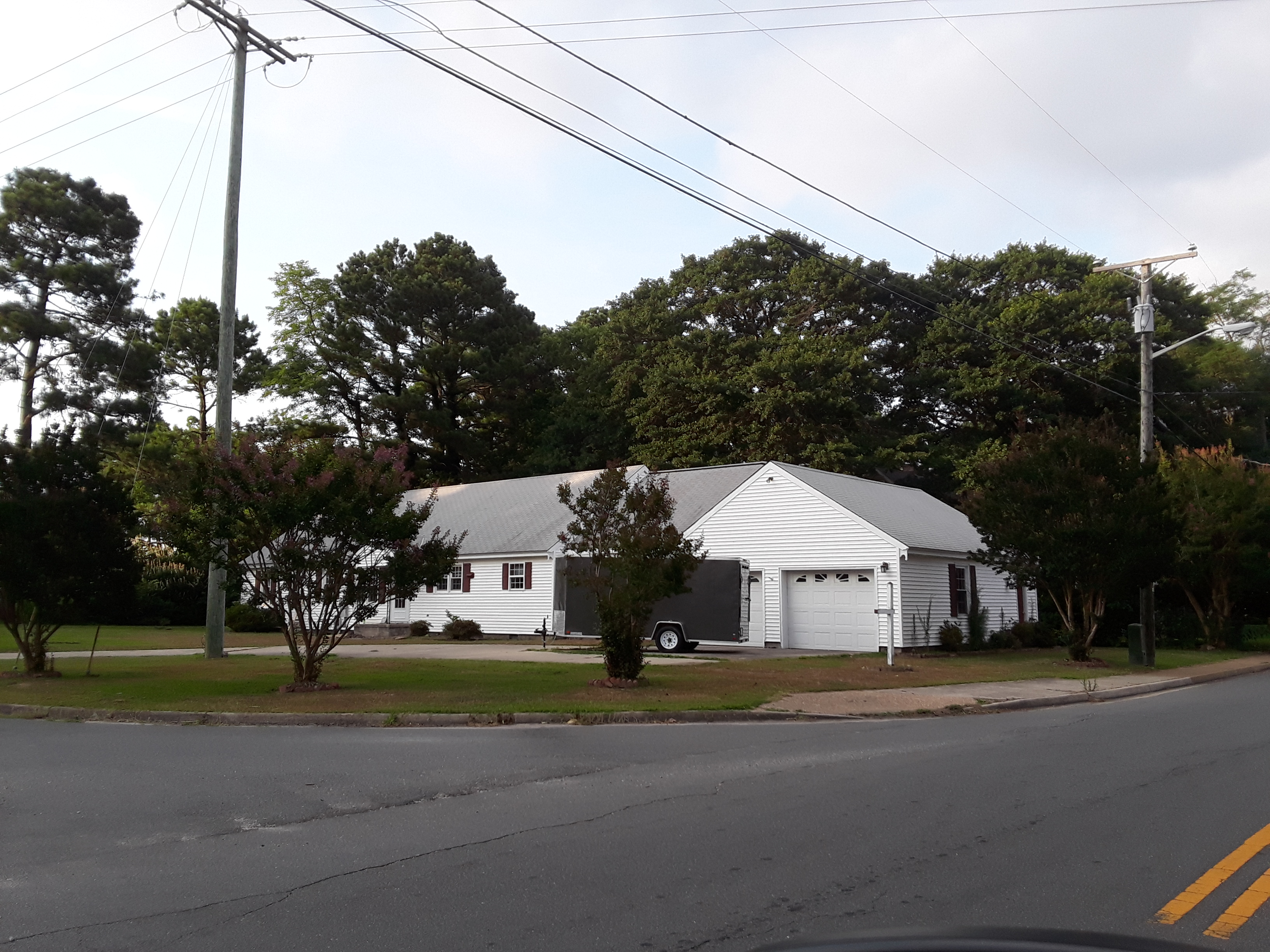
A house in Franktown

In the mid-19th century, it was a point along the stagecoach route between Wilmington, Delaware and Eastville.

The Glebe of Hungar's Parish was listed on the National Register of Historic Places in 1970.

Fannie Salter and her husband lived in Franktown for a time in the 1920s before moving to Turkey Point Light in Maryland; their son Charles Bradley was born there. Blues musician Arthur Crudup is buried in Franktown, as is politician Peter J. Carter.

== Demographics ==
Franktown first appeared as a census designated place in the 2020 U.S. census.

Franktown CDP, Virginia – Racial and ethnic composition Note: the US Census treats Hispanic/Latino as an ethnic category. This table excludes Latinos from the racial categories and assigns them to a separate category. Hispanics/Latinos may be of any race.
Race / Ethnicity (NH = Non-Hispanic)	Pop 2020	2020
White alone (NH)	50	81.97%
Black or African American alone (NH)	3	4.92%
Native American or Alaska Native alone (NH)	0	0.00%
Asian alone (NH)	0	0.00%
Native Hawaiian or Pacific Islander alone (NH)	0	0.00%
Other race alone (NH)	0	0.00%
Mixed race or Multiracial (NH)	2	3.28%
Hispanic or Latino (any race)	6	9.84%
Total	61	100.00%
