= Northampton Lumber Company Historic District =

Historic district in Virginia, United States

- U.S. National Register of Historic Places
- U.S. Historic district
- Virginia Landmarks Register
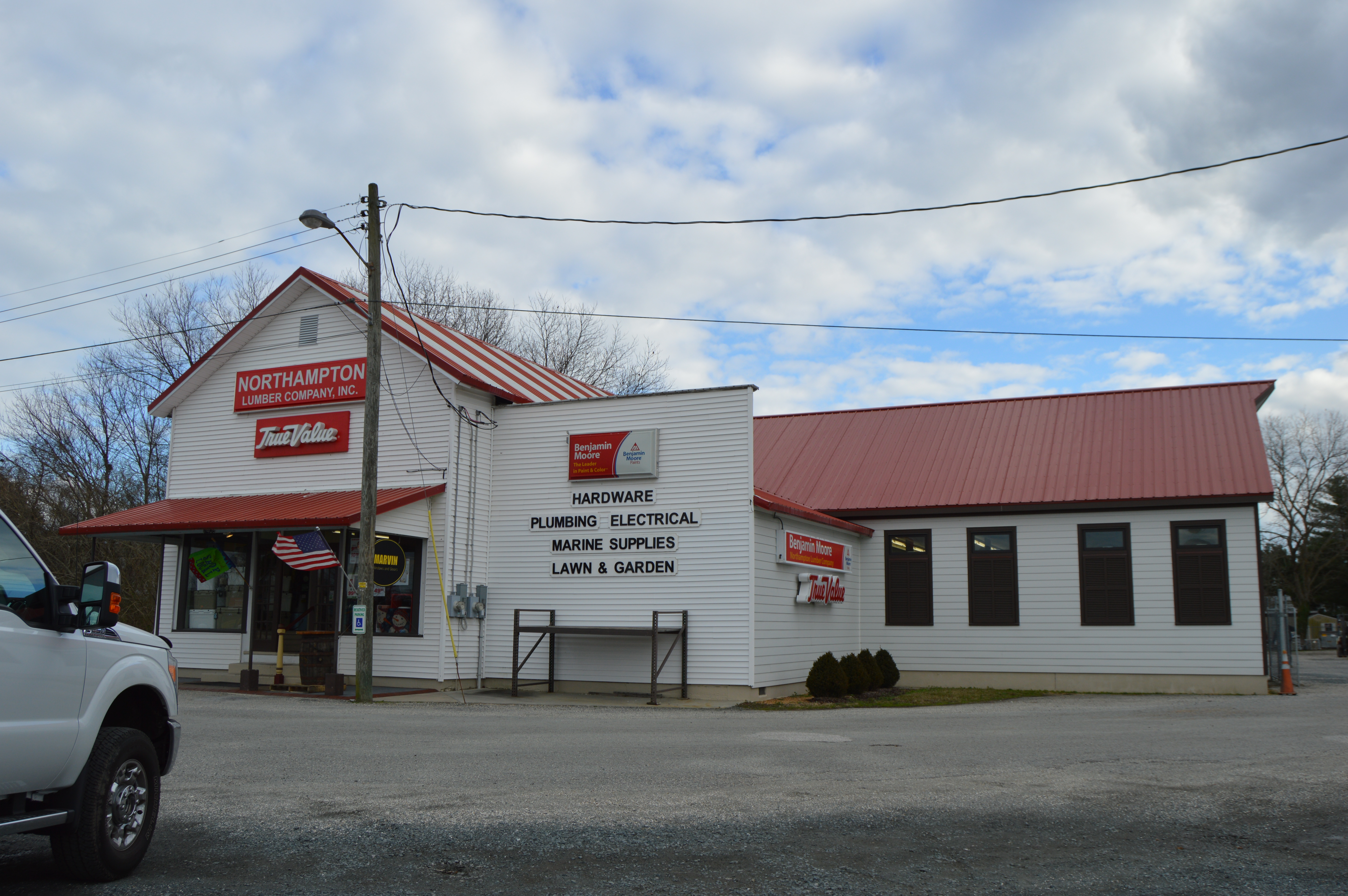
- Front of the retail building

- Location within Virginia Location within the United States
- Location: Junction of VA 912 & US 13, Nassawadox, Virginia
- Coordinates: 37°28′22″N 75°51′32″W
- Area: 7 acres (2.8 ha)
- Built: 1887
- NRHP reference No.: 08000480
- VLR No.: 267-5005

Significant dates
- Added to NRHP: May 29, 2008
- Designated VLR: March 20, 2008

Northampton Lumber Company Historic District is a historic saw mill and building supply store complex and national historic district located at Nassawadox, Northampton County, Virginia. The district encompasses seven contributing buildings and three contributing structures. They are the retail store (c. 1887), water tower (c. 1887), saw mill (c. 1887), potato shed, barn (c. 1912), 1940s shed, two lumber sheds, and two sets of New York, Pennsylvania, & Norfolk Railroad tracks. The Northampton Lumber Company has been an integral part of the history and livelihood of Nassawadox for over a century.

It was listed on the National Register of Historic Places in 2008.
