= Westover Gardens, Virginia =

Unincorporated community in Virginia, US

Coordinates: 37°31′18″N 77°31′27″W

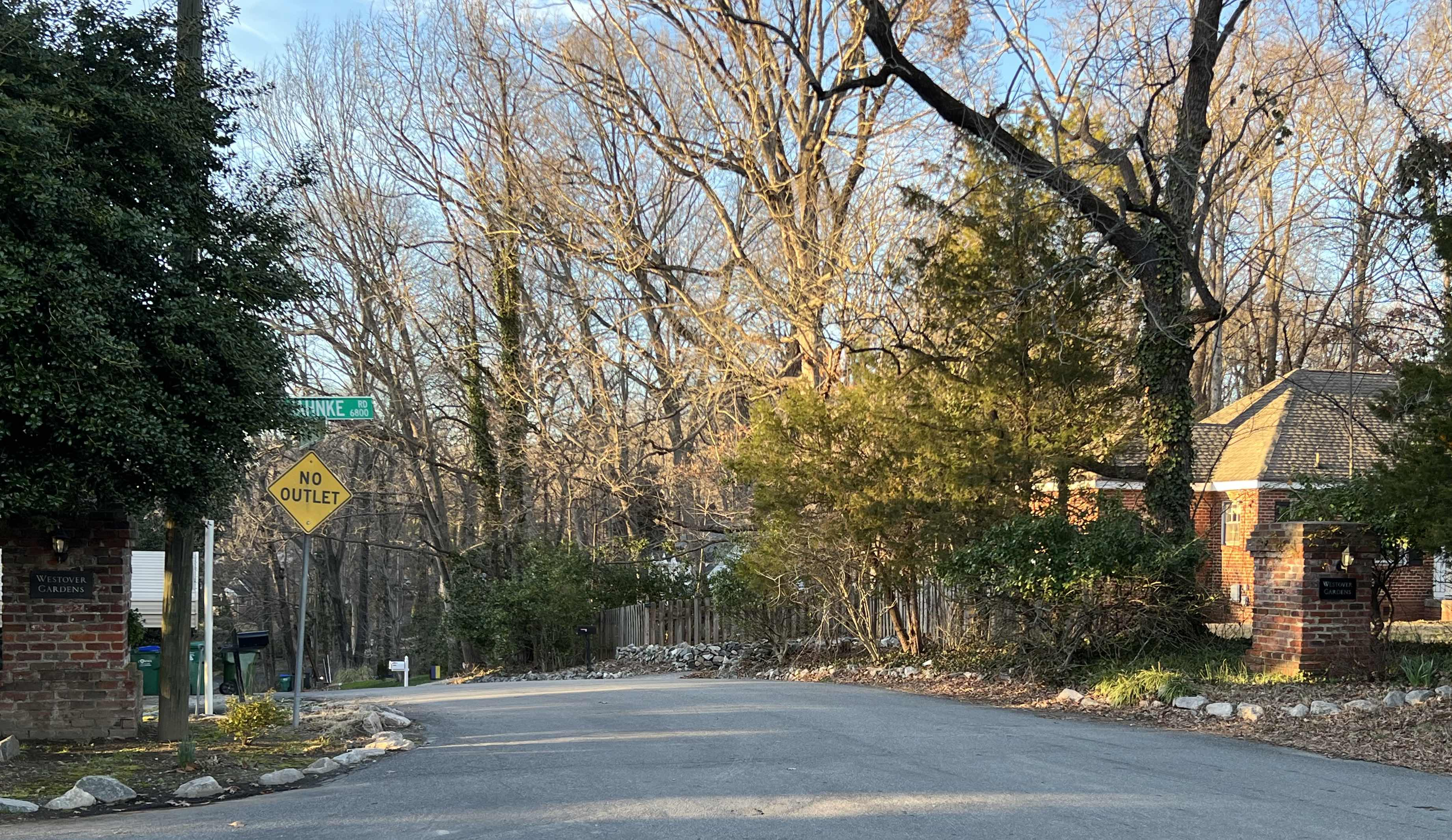
Entrance to Westover Gardens.

Westover Gardens is an unincorporated community in Richmond, in the U.S. state of Virginia.
