= John W. Chandler House =

Historic house in Virginia, United States

- U.S. National Register of Historic Places
- Virginia Landmarks Register
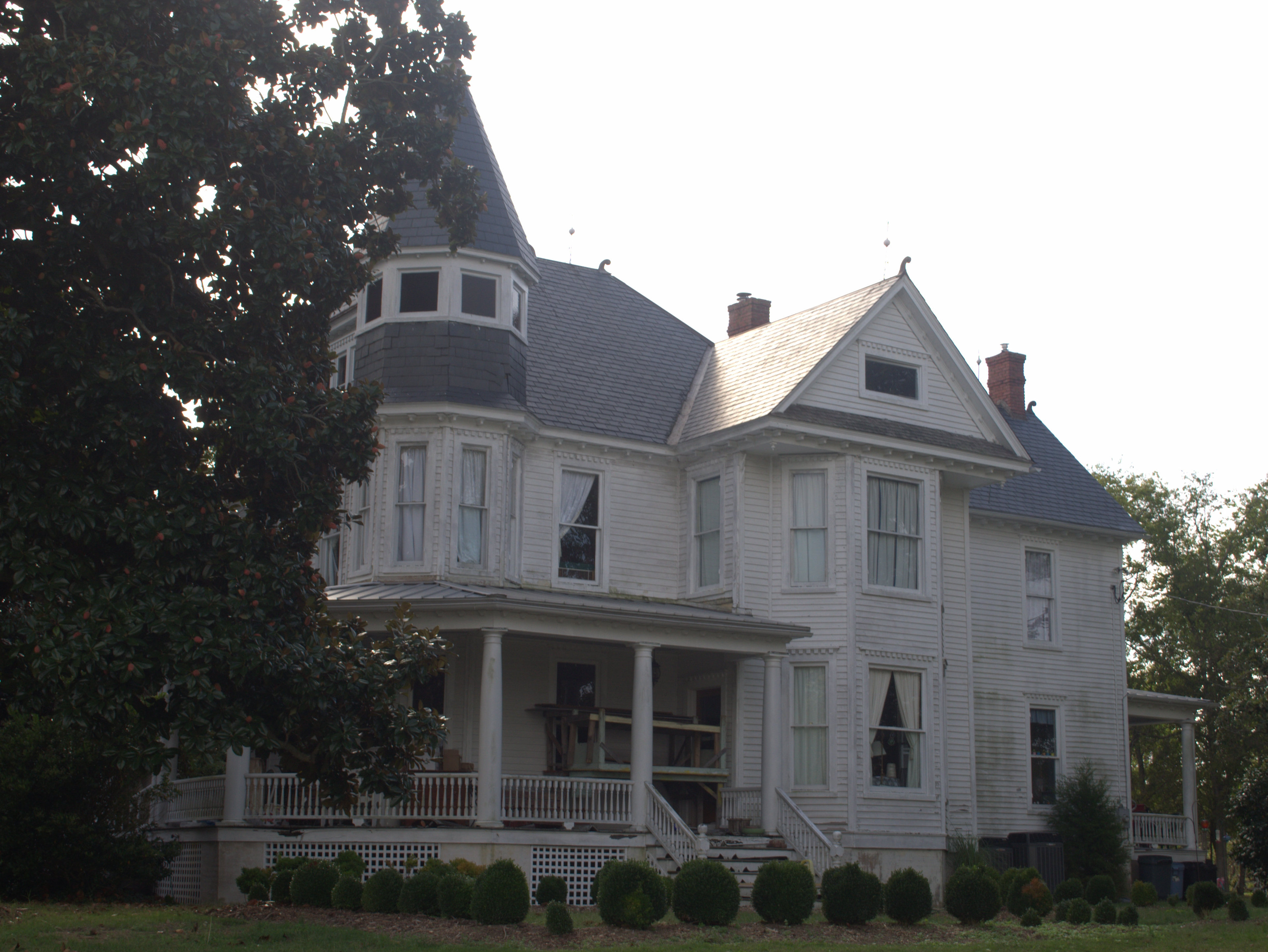
- House in 2013

- Location within Virginia Location within the United States
- Location: 3342 Main St., Exmore, Virginia
- Coordinates: 37°31′56″N 75°49′23″W
- Area: 2.5 acres (1.0 ha)
- Built: 1889-1890
- Architectural style: Queen Anne
- NRHP reference No.: 04001270
- VLR No.: 217-0009

Significant dates
- Added to NRHP: November 27, 2004
- Designated VLR: September 8, 2004

John W. Chandler House, also known as Mears House, is a historic home located at Exmore, Northampton County, Virginia. It was built in 1889–1890, and is a large two-story, frame Queen Anne style dwelling. It features a complex hipped-cross-gabled roof clad in slate shingles; a tower with octagonal roof; a two-story, projecting, canted bay capped by a closed gable; projecting curved bay, crowned by a closed gable with Palladian-style window; and a wrap around porch with Tuscan order columns. Also on the property are a contributing garage and sheds.

It was listed on the National Register of Historic Places in 2004.
