= Wardtown, Virginia =

Unincorporated community in Virginia, US

Coordinates: 37°32′05″N 75°52′37″W

Wardtown is an unincorporated community in Northampton County, Virginia, United States.

Grapeland was listed on the National Register of Historic Places in 1980.
