= Machipongo, Virginia =

Unincorporated community in Virginia, US

Coordinates: 37°24′21″N 75°54′06″W

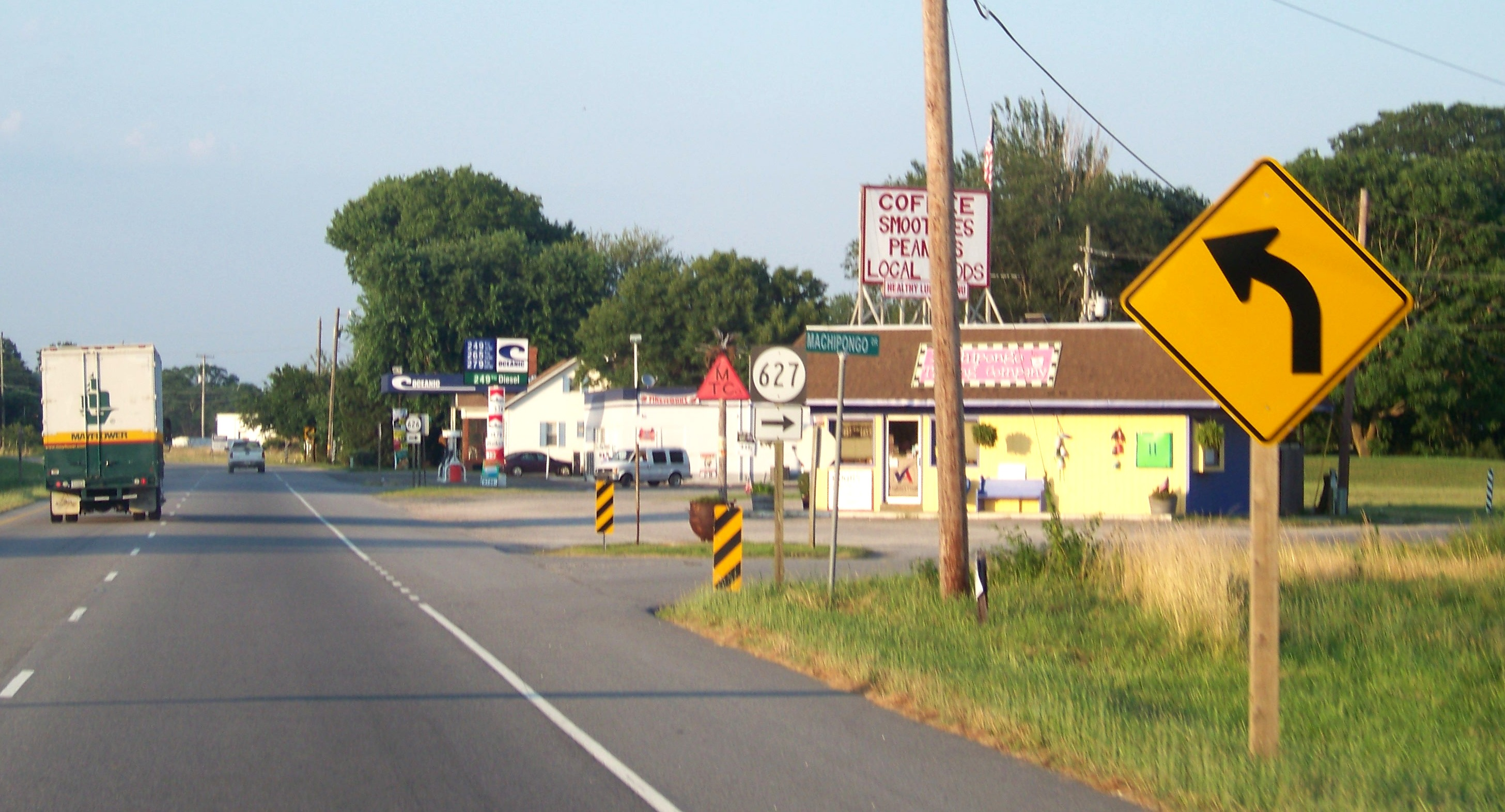
Entering Machipongo

Machipongo is an unincorporated community in Northampton County, Virginia, United States.

The Almshouse Farm at Machipongo was listed on the National Register of Historic Places in 2002. At the same time took place the grand opening of the Eastern Shore of Virginia Barrier Islands Center (BIC) founded in 1996 and housed in the Almshouse Farm. The mission of this cultural center, museum, meeting and event place is to preserve and perpetuate the culture and history of Virginia's barrier islands through education and the collection and interpretation of artifacts. The museum holds more than 7,500 artifacts and showcases a permanent exhibition.
