= Westover (Eastville, Virginia) =

Former historic house in Virginia, US

- Formerly listed on the U.S. National Register of Historic Places
- Virginia Landmarks Register
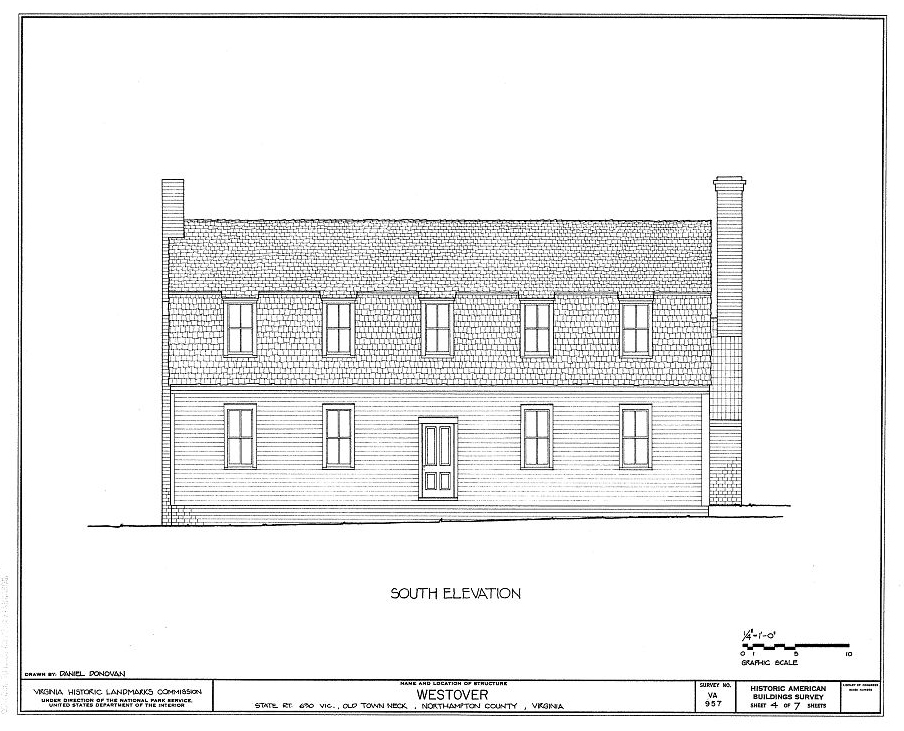
- Location: VA 630, near Eastville, Virginia
- Area: 50 acres (20 ha)
- Built: 1750
- Architectural style: Vernacular to Virginia
- NRHP reference No.: 82004577
- VLR No.: 065-0038

Significant dates
- Added to NRHP: June 23, 1982
- Designated VLR: November 18, 1980
- Removed from NRHP: March 19, 2001
- Delisted VLR: December 3, 1997

Westover was a historic plantation house located near Eastville, Northampton County, Virginia. The original house was about 1750, as a two-story, three-bay, single pile structure with a gambrel roof in a vernacular style indigenous to Virginia's Eastern Shore. A two-bay extension was added in the late-18th century, and a rear wing in the late-19th century. The house had brick ends and a chimney with steep sloping haunches and a corbeled brick cap. It was destroyed by fire between 1980 and 1997.

It was listed on the National Register of Historic Places in 1982 and delisted in 2001.
