= Exmore, Virginia =

- Town
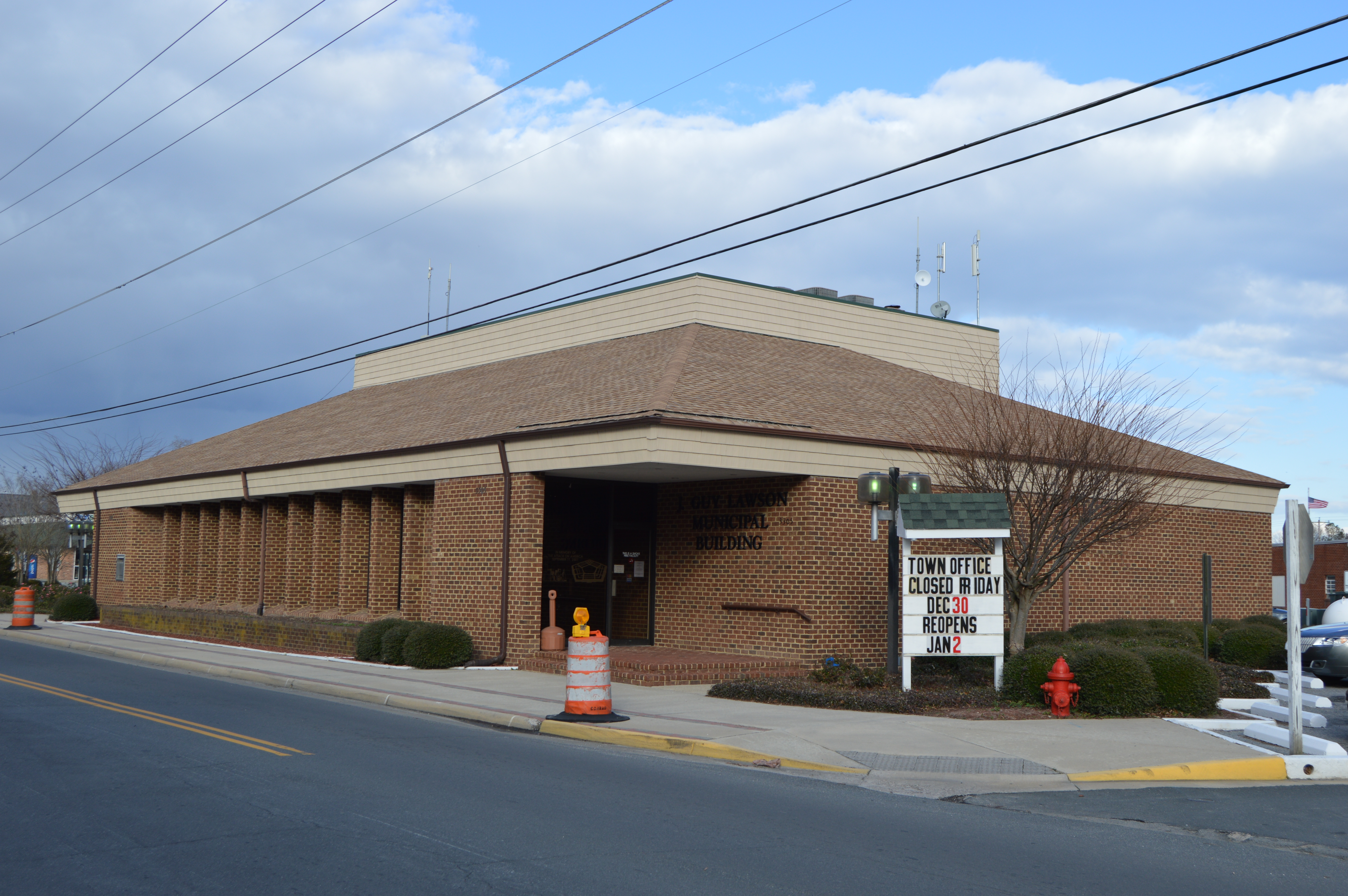
- Town hall
- Motto: "The Treasure of Virginia's Eastern Shore"
- Location in Northampton County and the state of Virginia.
- Coordinates: 37°31′59″N 75°49′28″W
- Country: United States
- State: Virginia
- County: Northampton

Area
  - Total: 2.60 sq mi (6.74 km^{2})
  - Land: 2.60 sq mi (6.74 km^{2})
  - Water: 0 sq mi (0.00 km^{2})
- Elevation: 33 ft (10 m)

Population (2020)
  - Total: 1,473
  - Density: 566/sq mi (218.7/km^{2})
- Time zone: UTC−5 (Eastern (EST))
  - Summer (DST): UTC−4 (EDT)
- ZIP code: 23350
- Area codes: 757, 948 (auto)
- FIPS code: 51-26416
- GNIS feature ID: 1466377
- Website: Official website

Exmore is the largest town in Northampton County on the Eastern Shore of the U.S. state of Virginia. The population was 1,473 at the 2020 census. A popular story is that Exmore received its name because it is the tenth railroad station south of the Delaware state line, so there were "X more" stations to go. The same website also states another theory behind the town's name—that it was named for Exmoor, Devon, in south west England. This theory is more plausible because many towns and counties in Virginia were named for places in England. Northampton County itself was named for Northamptonshire.

== History ==
Benjamin's Department Store and the John W. Chandler House are listed on the National Register of Historic Places.

The Virginia Barrier Island Center (BIC) offers exhaustive information on the local culture and history. Founded in 1996 and opened to visitors in 2002 on the former site of the Almshouse Farm in Machipongo 10 miles south of the town of Exmore and 20 miles north of the Chesapeake Bay Bridge-Tunnel, the BIC is a cultural center, a museum and a meeting and event place. Its mission is to preserve and perpetuate the culture and history of Virginia's barrier islands through education and the collection and interpretation of artifacts. The museum holds more than 7,500 artefacts and showcases a permanent exhibition.

== Geography ==
According to the United States Census Bureau, the town has a total area of 2.6 square miles (6.7 km^{2}), all land.

== Demographics ==
Historical population
Census	Pop.	Note	%±
1950	1,362		—
1960	1,566		15.0%
1970	1,421		−9.3%
1980	1,300		−8.5%
1990	1,115		−14.2%
2000	1,136		1.9%
2010	1,460		28.5%
2020	1,473		0.9%
U.S. Decennial Census

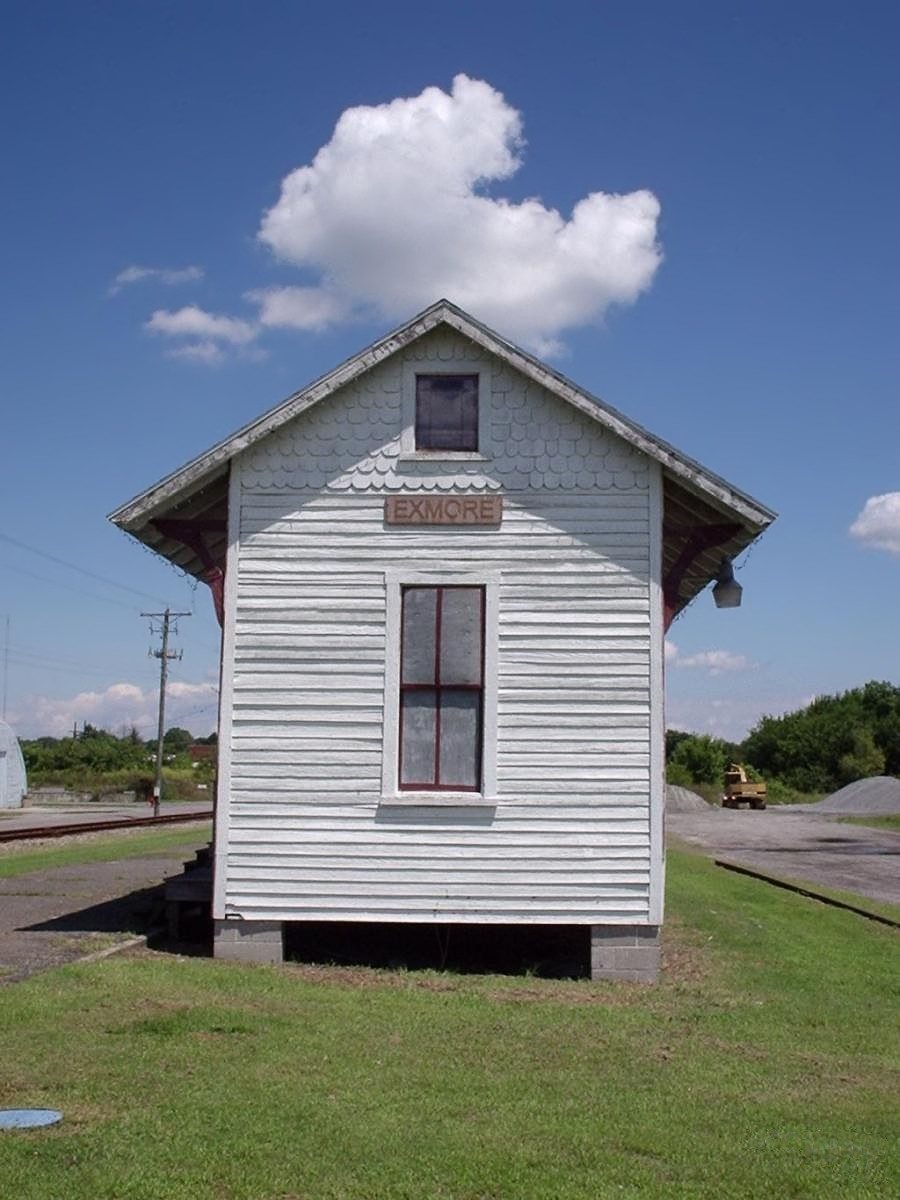
Exmore, VA

As of the census of 2000, there were 1,136 people, 475 households, and 317 families living in the town. The population density was 1,405.5 people per square mile (541.5/km^{2}). There were 524 housing units at an average density of 648.3 per square mile (249.8/km^{2}). The racial makeup of the town was 62.85% White, 33.80% African American, 0.44% Native American, 0.26% Asian, 0.09% Pacific Islander, 1.23% from other races, and 1.32% from two or more races. Hispanic or Latino of any race were 2.46% of the population.

There were 475 households, out of which 27.8% had children under the age of 18 living with them, 42.1% were married couples living together, 21.9% had a female householder with no husband present, and 33.1% were non-families. 28.4% of all households were made up of individuals, and 15.2% had someone living alone who was 65 years of age or older. The average household size was 2.39 and the average family size was 2.95.

In the town, the population was spread out, with 25.2% under the age of 18, 7.9% from 18 to 24, 24.6% from 25 to 44, 23.2% from 45 to 64, and 19.0% who were 65 years of age or older. The median age was 39 years. For every 100 females, there were 88.7 males. For every 100 females age 18 and over, there were 77.1 males.

The median income for a household in the town was $31,343, and the median income for a family was $34,816. Males had a median income of $25,234 versus $19,350 for females. The per capita income for the town was $15,305. About 16.8% of families and 19.6% of the population were below the poverty line, including 30.0% of those under age 18 and 11.5% of those age 65 or over.

== Transportation ==
=== Major highways ===
- US 13
- SR 178

=== Public transportation ===
STAR Transit provides public transit services, linking Exmore with Cape Charles, Onley, and other communities in Northampton and Accomack counties on the Eastern Shore.

=== Railroads ===
The Bay Coast Railroad provided Exmore with freight rail service until going out of business in 2018.
