= Jamesville, Virginia =

Human settlement in Northampton County, Virginia, United States

Coordinates: 37°30′54″N 75°55′50″W

Jamesville is an unincorporated community in Northampton County, Virginia, United States.
