= Fort Huger =

- U.S. National Register of Historic Places
- Virginia Landmarks Register
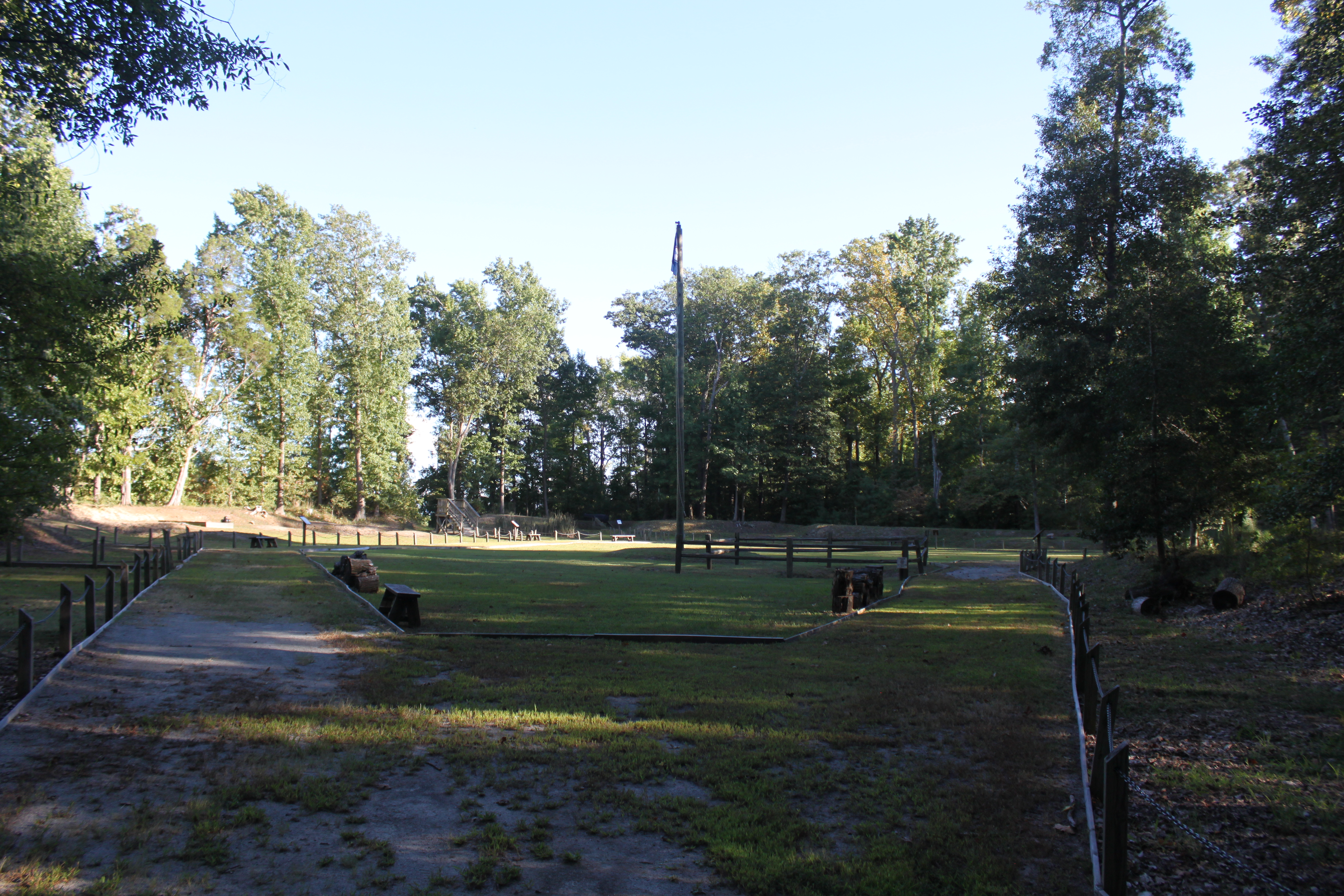

- Location within Virginia Location within the United States
- Location: Approx. 50 yds from jct. of Old Machlesfield Rd. and Macklesfield Ct., near Smithfield, Virginia
- Coordinates: 37°06′35″N 76°39′34″W
- Area: 22 acres (8.9 ha)
- Built: 1861
- NRHP reference No.: 08000320
- VLR No.: 046-0037

Significant dates
- Added to NRHP: April 16, 2008
- Designated VLR: December 5, 2007

Fort Huger is a historic archaeological site located near Smithfield, Isle of Wight County, Virginia. The site is the location of an abandoned American Civil War fort on the south side of the James River across from Fort Eustis/Mulberry Point. It was named for Major General Benjamin Huger, commander of the Confederate States Army's Department of Norfolk at the time it was built. Fort Huger was an integral part of the Confederate Army's James River defenses in late summer 1861 through spring 1862.

It was listed on the National Register of Historic Places in 2008.

== History ==
Fort Huger's site on Harden's Bluff (or Hardin's/Hardy's Point) was selected by Virginia's state engineer Colonel Andrew Talcott in August 1861 to supplement Fort Boykin, also on the south bank of the James, and the Mulberry Point battery on the north bank. The fort was also designed by him. Construction began immediately under Capt. E.T.D. Myers and Capt. John Clarke. The fort was completed in March 1862 with positions for 15 guns, 13 of which were occupied. A Confederate Engineer Bureau report of March 12, 1862 lists one 10-inch columbiad, four 9-inch Dahlgren shell guns, two 8-inch columbiads (all on barbette carriages) and six hot-shot 32-pounders on ship carriages. All of these weapons were smoothbores. The fort included a hot-shot furnace and was enclosed at the back by an earthen wall facing a swamp. The garrison was Lt. Col. Fletch Archer's 5th Virginia Infantry Battalion. This included two companies as artillery in the fort and three companies as infantry outside the fort. There was confusion of command at the fort between Archer and CSA Capt. De Lagnel, a former naval officer who commanded the fort's artillery companies. Generals John B. Magruder and Robert E. Lee wrote letters to address this confusion, essentially placing Archer in overall command and De Lagnel in charge of the artillery. Correspondence between Lt. Col. Henry Cabell and Brigadier General Lafayette McLaws indicated other deficiencies at the fort. There was no "clear zone" in the woods behind it that attackers would have to cross under fire, wooden structures in the fort might catch fire under bombardment, and there were no bomb-proof shelters. The lack of proper fortress carriages for the 32-pounders was also a deficiency, and the gun crews were not being drilled in reloading their weapons. In April 1862 Capt. J. M. Maury took command of the fort's artillery.

On May 8, 1862, Fort Huger was attacked by a Union Navy squadron that also attacked Fort Boykin. The warships included USS Galena, Aroostook, and Port Royal under Commander John Rodgers as part of the Peninsula campaign, an unsuccessful Union offensive from Fort Monroe to Richmond. Fort Boykin was soon silenced and abandoned, as its guns lacked the range to reply to the bombardment. The Union ran low on ammunition firing against Fort Huger and withdrew, but returned on the 16th reinforced by the ironclads USS Monitor and USRC Naugatuck. This bombardment resulted in the Confederates spiking their guns and abandoning Fort Huger. A report by Union Navy Lt. John Waters after examining the fort showed that many of the concerns noted in mid-March were addressed, including clearing the woods behind the fort and building bomb-proofs.

== Present ==
The site was acquired by Isle of Wight County Parks and Recreation in 2005 and opened to the public as a park in 2007. Archaeological investigations are ongoing. Five replicas of Civil War-era cannons are at the fort.

== See also ==
- Seacoast defense in the United States
- List of coastal fortifications of the United States
- National Register of Historic Places listings in Isle of Wight County, Virginia
