= Fort Boykin =

- Fort Boykin Archaeological Site (44IW20)
- U.S. National Register of Historic Places
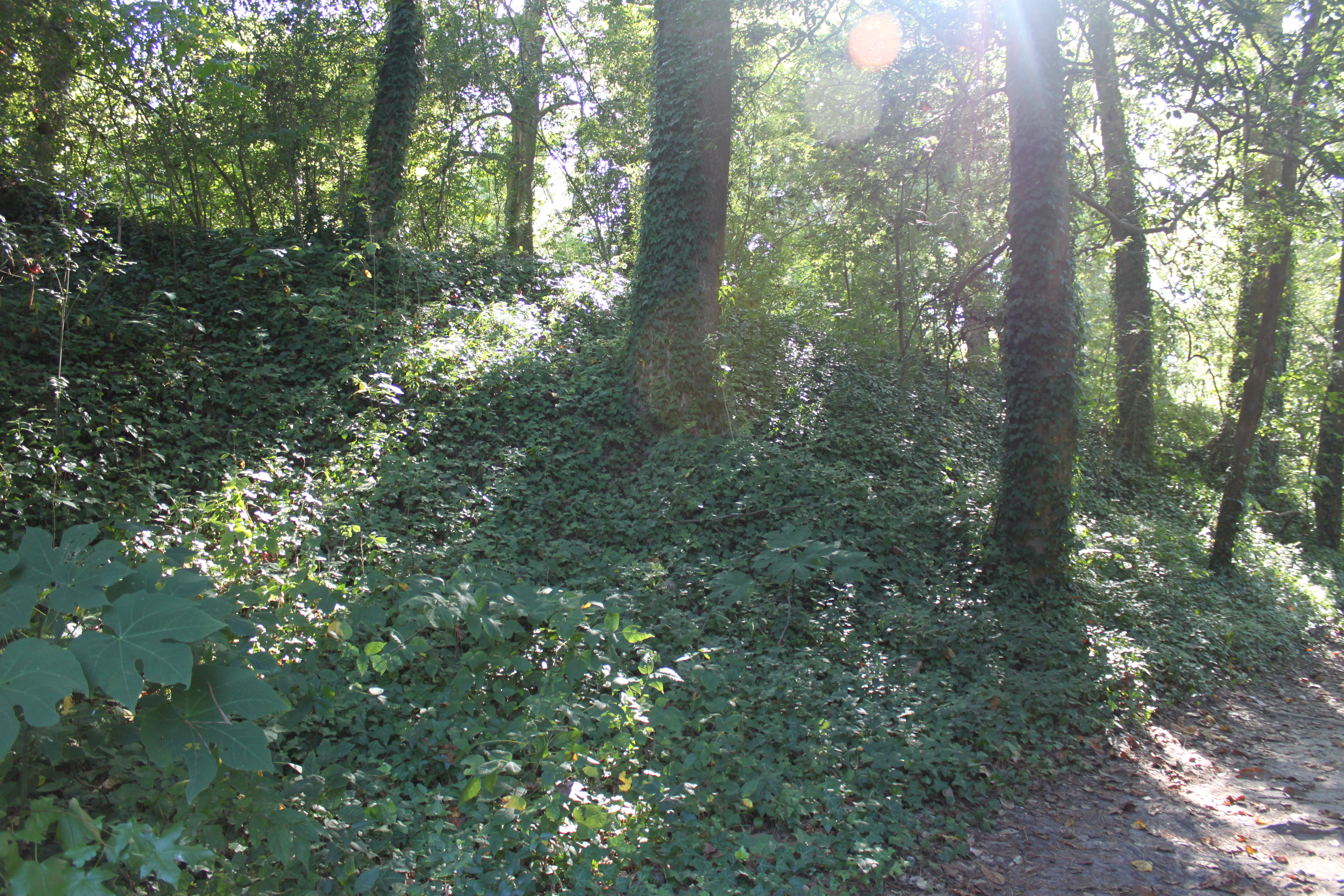
- Earthwork at Fort Boykin

- Location within Virginia Location within the United States
- Nearest city: Smithfield, Virginia
- Coordinates: 37.034831°N 76.619947°W
- Area: 14.4 acres (5.8 ha)
- Built: 1861
- Architect: Colonel Andrew Talcott
- NRHP reference No.: 85001675
- Added to NRHP: August 1, 1985

Fort Boykin is a historic site in Isle of Wight County, Virginia, located along the James River. The history of the site is believed to date back to 1623 when colonists were ordered to build a fort to protect them from attacking Native Americans or Spanish marauders. Today the remains of the fort, mostly from the American Civil War, are preserved in a public park.

== Colonial period ==
The fort was built in 1623 by Captain Roger Smith, in the wake of the devastating Indian Attack of 1622. The attack claimed 347 people in the Virginia colony, a quarter of the population, including 52 in Warrosquyoake Shire (an early name for Isle of Wight County). Potential attacks by the Spanish were also a consideration. On May 21, 1623, the Governor's Council ordered Smith to build a fort on "the Worrosquoyacke shore, opposite to Tindall Shoals". The fort, originally christened "The Castle" due to its deep natural ditches, high elevation and steep embankment fronting the James River, was also known as Roger Smith's Fort and the Fort at Warraskoyack. It took six months to build and was a triangular shaped earthenwork, surrounded by a ditch, topped by palisade walls. The James River became the main trade route to and from the interior of Virginia and The Castle overlooked it.

During Bacon's Rebellion in 1677, Fort Boykin was active according to the journal of the ship Young Prince.

== American Revolution ==
During the American Revolutionary War, the Castle was enlarged, refortified, and renamed Fort Boykin in honor of Major Francis M. Boykin, a local officer in the Continental Army who was then the owner of the site. He had served on George Washington's staff. It was also known as the Fort at the Rocks, the Rocks being the name of the adjacent plantation. What little was left of The Castle was enlarged upon with new ramparts and gun emplacements added. Military records list no engagements with the enemy either at the fort or in its vicinity, and after the British surrender in 1781 the fort was again abandoned.

== War of 1812 ==
The fort is believed to have been reworked again during the War of 1812 when it was enlarged to the shape of a five-pointed star. Although the records do not reveal any direct engagements with the fort, it is known that the British warship HMS Plantagenet lay offshore in the river for several months. During that time, the British attempted to land at the wharf of The Rocks plantation, only to be beaten back by the men stationed at the fort. After the war was over, the fort was left to the elements.

== American Civil War ==
The American Civil War brought a renewed interest in the fort by the Confederate Army, and the size was doubled from that of its previous incarnation.

Between June 1861 and May 1862, the Confederate Army cleared, refurbished and refortified Fort Boykin as one in a series of earthworks designed to prevent invasion by the Union, whose buildup at the mouth of the James River posed a severe threat to Richmond. Commander of the Virginia forces Robert E. Lee ordered Col. Andrew Talcott, State Engineer of Virginia, to redesign Fort Boykin in August 1861. Similar defensive works were built at Fort Huger, Mulberry Island, Jamestown Island and Drewry's Bluff. Construction on Fort Boykin soon began under Talcott's son Capt. T.M.R. Talcott and Lt. W.G. Turpin. Some Confederate records call the fort the Day's Point Battery. Although incomplete by May 1862, the fort had positions for 14 guns of which 10 were mounted. A report of March 12, 1862 shows a mix of 32-pounder and 42-pounder smoothbore cannon, all facing the James River. A hot-shot furnace was also at the fort.

On May 8, 1862, the fort was fired upon by a Union Navy fleet consisting of the USS Galena, Aroostook, and Port Royal as part of the Peninsula campaign, an unsuccessful Union offensive from Fort Monroe to Richmond. With the Union guns outranging the fort's guns, the soldiers manning the fort spiked their guns and retreated. Union marines came ashore on 17 May, destroyed what they could, and blew up the powder magazine. For the remainder of the war, the site was used by the Confederate Signal Corps, among whose ranks were poet Sidney Lanier and his brother Clifford.

== Post Civil War ==
After the Civil War, the fort was no longer used as a military installation and was again left to become an overgrown shadow of itself. The property was bought in 1908 by Herbert and Mary Greer and a house was built inside its earthworks. The Jorden family acquired the property in 1950. After the last owner died in 1976, the fort was given to the state for public use.

== Present ==
Today the fort remains largely intact, but most of the front wall facing the river has eroded away. It is now the property of Isle of Wight County, and is a public park. It was listed on the National Register of Historic Places in 1985 for its archaeological potential.

== See also ==
- Fort Huger
- Seacoast defense in the United States
- List of coastal fortifications of the United States
- National Register of Historic Places listings in Isle of Wight County, Virginia
