= USS Aroostook (1861) =

Gunboat of the United States Navy

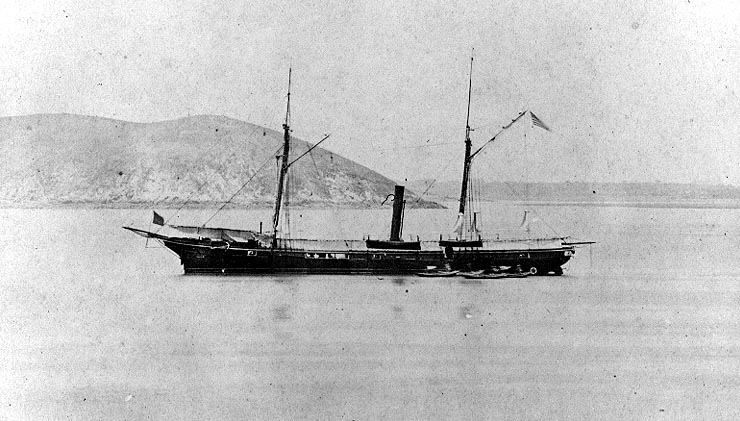
- USS Aroostook in Chinese waters, circa 1867-69.

History

United States
- Name: USS Aroostook
- Builder: N. L. Thompson (Kennebunk, ME)
- Cost: $100,500
- Launched: About 19 Oct 1861
- Commissioned: 20 Feb 1862
- Decommissioned: 18 Sep 1869
- Stricken: 1869 (est.)
- Nickname(s): Old Rooster
- Fate: Sold, Hong Kong, October 1869

General characteristics
- Class & type: Unadilla-class gunboat
- Displacement: 691 tons
- Tons burthen: 507
- Length: 158 ft (48 m) (waterline)
- Beam: 28 ft (8.5 m)
- Draft: 9 ft 6 in (2.90 m) (max.)
- Depth of hold: 12 ft (3.7 m)
- Propulsion: 2 × 200 IHP 30-in bore by 18 in stroke horizontal back-acting engines; single screw
- Sail plan: Two-masted schooner
- Speed: 10 kn (11.5 mph)
- Complement: 114
- Armament: Original: 1 × 11-in Dahlgren smoothbore; 2 × 24-pdr smoothbore; 2 × 20-pdr Parrott rifle

USS Aroostook was a Unadilla-class gunboat built for the Union Navy during the American Civil War. Aroostook was used by the Navy to patrol navigable waterways of the Confederacy to prevent the South from trading with other countries.

== Construction and design ==
Aroostook -- a wooden-hulled, steam-propelled, screw gunboat—was laid down by Nathaniel Lord Thompson sometime soon after 6 July 1861, at Kennebunk, Maine; launched on or around 19 October 1861; and commissioned at the Boston Navy Yard on 20 February 1862, Lt. John C. Beaumont in command.

== Civil War service ==
=== Rescue of Vermont ===
On 1 March 1862, toward the end of the gunboat's fitting out process, word reached the yard that, during a fierce storm, USS Vermont had lost her rudder, her bower anchors, all of her rigging, and four of her boats and was drifting helplessly amid raging seas some 95 miles south-southeast of Cape Cod Light. Capt. William L. Hudson, the commandant of the yard, ordered Beaumont to proceed in Aroostook to the vicinity where the disabled ship of the line had last been seen and, upon finding Vermont, to stand by her until other aid arrived.

After getting underway on 2 March, Aroostook located the distressed vessel on the 7th and then lay to, shielding Vermont from the wind. During the ensuing week, Aroostook lost her smokestack and suffered other damage. On the 15th, after the steamer Saxon arrived on the scene and relieved her, Aroostook headed for the Delaware capes.

The gunboat entered the Philadelphia Navy Yard on the 23d and, following repair of her storm damage and the installation of a new smoke stack, she headed for the Virginia Capes on the last day of March and entered Hampton Roads on 2 April.

=== Monitor vs. Virginia ===
The preceding month had been very dramatic. CSS Virginia—the scuttled and burnt screw frigate Merrimack, raised and rebuilt as a Southern ironclad ram—had made her deadly foray into that roadstead and destroyed the frigate Congress and Cumberland

originally a frigate but cut down to a razee sloop of war. The next day, the novel and plucky Union ironclad Monitor had challenged and checked Virginia when the dreaded Confederate warship reentered Hampton Roads to finish off the remaining Union blockading squadron.

Their fierce fight to a draw on the historic afternoon of 9 March began some two months of an uneasy naval stalemate in Hampton Roads while Union Army transports brought the troops of General George B. McClellan's Army of the Potomac to the area to launch a drive toward Richmond, Virginia, up the peninsula formed by the York and James Rivers. Strict Confederate secrecy covered Virginia during the weeks following the epic, but inconclusive, battle. The Southern ironclad had reentered the Norfolk Navy Yard to get a new ram to replace that which had broken off in Cumberland's hull as Virginia backed free of her first victim. She also received new armor plates to replace those cracked in battle as well as an armored belt just below her vulnerable casemate eves.

==== Countering CSS Virginia ====
Meanwhile, the Union Navy withdrew its sailing warships and some of its deep-draft steamers from Hampton Roads and replaced them with light-draft steam gunboats which were able to maneuver freely in the trick shoal waters inside the Virginia Capes. Aroostook was one of these gunboats, and, after entering Hampton Roads, remained constantly ready for action. During this period, the leaders of the Union Navy showed great imagination in devising innovative tactics for combating the ironclad. Lt. Beaumont decided that he might bring Virginia to bay by ensnaring her propeller in a long heavy net and seine that Aroostook's crew had made of "rattling" stuff. Such a procedure, he reasoned, would "...neutralize her motive power."

When his fellow commanding officers had learned of Beaumont's plan, they seemed to fear Aroostook even more than they dreaded Virginia lest the gunboat's now notorious net might foul their own screws. For instance, Comdr. James P. McKinstry, the captain of the screw steamer Dacotah, would constantly warn his officers,

Keep out of Beaumont's way. Don't let Beaumont get near you. Keep your eye on the Aroostook.

Virginia rounded Sewell's Point on 11 April; but, since strategic considerations prevented her from challenging Monitor or the other nearby Union warships, Aroostook's dreaded net never entered the water. Nevertheless, forces were then at work which would enable the Union gunboat to play a highly significant role in one of the more dramatic scenes of the Civil War.

On 24 April, the new and lightly armored gunboat Galena joined the Union flotilla serving in Hampton Roads. Her captain, Comdr. John Rodgers, was one of the Navy's most imaginative strategists and most skillful tacticians; and he immediately began studying the situation facing Union forces in the area.

=== James River ===
When President Abraham Lincoln arrived there about a fortnight later, Rodgers visited him and suggested that "...there was a great opening for a Naval movement up James River ...." Prompt action was necessary since Virginia was then at Norfolk, Virginia, undergoing yard work but was expected to emerge the following afternoon. Should she reach the mouth of the James before the Union task force began its ascent, the Confederate ironclad could bring the whole plan to naught.

After conferring with Flag Officer Goldsborough, the commander of the North Atlantic Blockading Squadron, Lincoln approved the plan, and Rodgers received command of the little task force—consisting of Galena, Aroostook, and Port Royal—which got underway shortly after dawn on 8 May. By mid-morning, they were taken under fire by a Confederate battery at Fort Boykin which their counter fire silenced. A second group of Southern guns at Fort Huger offered more resistance, forcing Galena to pass and re-pass that point seven times before Rodgers had Galena lie still abreast the battery which her own cannon engaged while her unarmored consorts slipped by unscathed.

Another danger soon became apparent. The channel marks had been moved causing Galena to run aground off Hog Island, 4 miles downstream from Jamestown on the southern side of the James River. Aroostook and Port Royal labored incessantly for 36 hours before they managed to refloat their stranded flagship which then led them farther upstream.

The Confederate gunboats Patrick Henry and Yorktown—which had been in sight during the action at Mother Tyne's Bluff—had retired upstream ahead of the northern flotilla where Rodgers believed they had joined three other Southern warships. Feeling that he was badly outmatched, Rodgers dropped down to Jamestown Island and sent a messenger to Goldsborough asking for reinforcements.

This appeal reached the flag officer at a most propitious moment, for the South had just evacuated Norfolk and, since Virginia had lost her base, had destroyed the dreaded ironclad ram—lest she fall into Union hands—Goldsborough for the first time, was able to deploy elsewhere the forces he had held in Hampton Roads to check the rebuilt Merrimack. He promptly ordered Monitor and Naugatuck to ascend the James to reinforce Rodgers. The two ships joined Rodgers off Jamestown Island on the 12th, and the combined force moved up to City Point the next day. As they continued on upriver on the 14th, Galena ran aground as the tide was falling, and Aroostook and her consorts labored four hours before they refloated the flotilla flagship.

==== Drewry's Bluff ====
Only one obstacle stood between the Union warships and Richmond, the Confederate capital which they hoped to capture, just as a Federal force commanded by Flag Officer David Farragut had taken New Orleans, Louisiana, a few weeks before. This was a battery on Drewry's Bluff above a bend in the river some eight miles below the threatened city.

Before dawn on the 15th, Rodgers ships weighed anchor to resume their ascent of the James and came

...under a sharp fire of musketry from both banks, to which ...[they] replied occasionally with howitzers and small arms.

At 7:35 A.M., they sighted puffs of smoke blossom on Drewry's Bluff as the Southern batteries opened fire. Shortly afterwards lookouts spotted obstructions in the channel that would soon halt their progress. Galena anchored some 600 yards from the Confederate cannon, and Monitor stopped immediately below the flagship. At 8:00 A.M., Aroostook, Port Royal, and Naugatuck moored about 400 yards farther downstream, and Aroostook began firing with her 11-inch Dahlgren gun.

She kept up the bombardment until the cliffside gunners found her range at 9:45. The gunboat then dropped 100 yards farther downstream and resumed her shelling. By 11:00, Galena and Monitor had almost emptied their magazines, prompting Rodgers to break off the action and then to retire downstream. Aroostook—which had "...received a shot at the waterline under the after part of the starboard forechains ..." and another "...through the starboard bow one foot above the sheet hawse hole"—suffered no personnel casualties during the engagement.

==== Return downstream ====
For the next few months, the gunboat continued to operate in the James, occasionally dropping as far downstream as Fort Monroe, but never venturing far enough upriver to come within range of the guns at Drewry's Bluff.

During this period, she carried messages, munitions, and supplies and gathered intelligence of Confederate activity for the use of both McClellan and Goldsborough. Occasionally, she came under small arms attack from the riverbanks; and silenced her assailants by well-directed gunfire. On 9 June, the ship proceeded to Jamestown Island where she landed a party which destroyed the guns, ammunition, gun carriages and buildings of the abandoned Confederate batteries.

Four days later, she performed similar service by wrecking the former Southern works at the mouth of Archershape Creek and reconnoitered the then abandoned riverside artillery positions at Harden's Bluff and Day's Point.

==== Seven Days campaign ====
Meanwhile, after inching its way up the peninsula, the Union army was just outside Richmond, preparing to lay siege to the Confederate capital. In mid-June, McClellan, alarmed about his vulnerable dangling right flank and the line of communications to his base at the White House, ordered a reconnaissance probe toward the James to determine the feasibility of establishing a base on the north bank of that river where his army would enjoy the support of Union warships. On the 18th, after receiving favorable reports, McClellan ordered transports and supply ships from the York River to Harrison's Landing on the north bank of the James.

The wisdom of this measure became apparent during the Seven Days campaign late in the month. In a series of bloody battles which began on 25 June, Robert E. Lee drove McClellan's troops across the peninsula to this new base on the James where Aroostook joined other Union warships in protecting the beleaguered Federal ground forces.

She continued to carry out this duty through the ensuing weeks, first while McClellan was hoping to resume the offensive and later while he was withdrawing his troops from the peninsula to resume operations in northern Virginia.

==== Escaped slaves ====
During this period, Beaumont became ill and was relieved in command of Aroostook by Lt. Samuel Rhoads Franklin. About this time, the ship chanced upon a group of runaway slaves and offered them refuge on board. When Franklin asked one if he and his companions had not been afraid of being shot for attempting to escape, he confidently replied

No, saah, when we seed de Old Rooster coming along, we knowed we was all right.

Thereafter, her crew affectionately called their ship the "Old Rooster."

=== Potomac River Flotilla ===
When the last of McClellan's troops had embarked in transports which would take them to Aquia, Virginia, to reinforce Gen. Pope's army in defense of Washington, D.C., Welles wired Commodore Charles Wilkes, the commander of the James River Flotilla, disbanding that organization and ordering him to proceed—with Aroostook, four other warships, and six mortar boats—to Washington to take command of the Potomac Flotilla. Aroostook reached the Washington Navy Yard on 1 September and spent the remainder of that month operating on the Potomac River, bolstering the defensive forces of the National Capital which was then threatened by General Lee's troops who had recently defeated Pope's army and crossed the Potomac into Maryland.

The Army of the Potomac fought Confederate invaders at Sharpsburg, Maryland, on the 17th and stalled their advance in the most bloody single-day battle of the war. This battle prompted Lee to retire below the Potomac. The Southern withdrawal relieved much of the pressure on Washington and freed some of the Union warships in the Potomac for duty elsewhere.

=== West Gulf Blockade ===
Reassigned to the West Gulf Blockading Squadron, Aroostook departed Washington on 2 October and proceeded via Fort Monroe to her new station. She reached the Pensacola Navy Yard on the 16th and, after six days of voyage repairs, joined the blockading forces off Mobile Bay, Alabama.

Guarding this port was her primary duty for almost a year. Her first notable action of this assignment came during a fierce gale on the night of 15 December 1862 when she sighted a vessel "...passing to sea from the northward." She signaled her sister blockaders and gave chase. She lost sight of the stranger; but, early the following morning, saw a schooner grounded in shoals east of Sand Island. Soon afterwards the stranded vessel began issuing smoke and then became "...enveloped in flames." The fire raged throughout the day and into the following night, and floating burned cotton indicated that the vessel had been an outward-bound blockade runner.

==== Capture of blockade runners ====
On 5 March 1863, a lookout in the "Old Rooster" made out "... a sail close to the beach trying to run into Mobile Bay", and the Northern gunboat immediately raced off in pursuit. This stranger then ran ashore, and her crew escaped in a boat. Aroostook—joined by the screw steamer Pocahontas—shelled the vessel, the 40- to 50-ton sloop Josephine, until she "...was a complete wreck." The following night, the same two blockaders, chased and fired upon another small sailing vessel; but "an ugly sea", darkness, and shoal water enabled this runner to reach safety inside Mobile Bay.

On the evening of 9 May, Aroostook took Sea Lion as that schooner was trying to slip out of Mobile Bay with 272 bales of cotton which she hoped to deliver to Havana, Cuba. Nine days later, she was one of the warships which by her nearby position supported the gunboat Kanawha in the capture of the cotton laden schooner Hunter.

About an hour after midnight on 17 July, Aroostook and Kennebec both observed a steamer attempting to slip out of Mobile, informed their sister blockaders of the fact, and headed for the blockade runner. In response to their signals, the steam sloop Ossipee also gave chase; soon passed her informants; and, shortly after dawn, brought the fleeing ship to with a few well directed rounds. The prize proved to be the cotton-laden steamer James Battle which had jettisoned some 50 of her more than 600 bales of cotton. Following in her wake, Aroostook picked up about 40 bales of the floating cargo.

Late in her tour of duty off Mobile Bay, she twice engaged shore batteries: on 19 April and on 23 June. Lt. Comdr. Chester Hatfield was detached from the steam sloop Brooklyn and relieved Franklin in command of Aroostook on 28 July.

==== Yellow fever outbreak ====
Yellow fever broke out in the gunboat late in the summer. Hence, on 13 September, the gunboat departed her station off Mobile Bay and proceeded, via Pensacola, Florida, to quarantine in the lower Mississippi River where she arrived on the 17th. When the crew had been restored to good health, the ship move upriver to New Orleans, Louisiana, on the 26th for badly needed repairs.

=== Texas coast ===
Ready for sea again in mid-November, the ship started down river on the 17th and headed for the coast of Texas. On the 22d, while en route to Galveston, Texas, she captured the schooner Eureka which had slipped out of the Brazos River laden with cotton for delivery to Havana, Cuba.

During her service in Texas waters which—but for occasional voyages back to New Orleans for repairs—lasted through the end of the Civil War, Aroostook also took the schooner Cosmopolite on 23 January 1864, the schooner Mary P. Burton on 3 March, and the schooner Marion on 12 March. On 8 July, after Kanawha had forced the blockade runner Matagorda aground near Galveston, Aroostook and Penguin joined that Union gunboat in shelling the stranded steamer to destruction.

From time to time during this period, Aroostook engaged Confederate shore batteries, and occasionally picked up large quantities of floating cotton which had been jettisoned by fleeing blockade runners.

=== Decommission ===
A few months after hostilities ended, Aroostook departed New Orleans on 7 September 1865 and reached the Philadelphia Navy Yard on the 19th. She was decommissioned there on 25 September and laid up.

== Postwar service ==
=== Asiatic Squadron ===
==== Combating piracy ====
Meanwhile, about a month before, Acting Rear Admiral Henry H. Bell in Hartford had sailed for the Far East to reestablish the East India Squadron which had been inactive since its warships had returned to the East Coast of the United States to join in the fighting at home.

Upon reaching Oriental waters, Bell recognized piracy as one of the most serious problems facing western navies in the Far East and requested reinforcement by light-draft gunboats that could pursue Asiatic freebooters who sought refuge in shallow coastal waters where deep-draft warships could not follow.

Recommissioned on 21 December 1866, Comdr. Lester A. Beardslee in command, Aroostook proceeded to the Far East via the Atlantic Ocean-Cape of Good Hope-Indian Ocean route, arrived at Hong Kong late in August 1867; and joined Bell's force which had recently been renamed the Asiatic Squadron.

A short time later, she sailed for Japan with most of Bell's flotilla to take part in a mass demonstration of Western and Japanese warships off the southern coast of Honshu on 1 January 1868 when the ports of Kobe and Osaka were to be opened to foreign trade.

==== Drowning of Admiral Bell ====
Bell had recently received orders to return home in Hartford. While he was being rowed ashore to pay a farewell visit to the American resident minister to Japan at Osaka on the morning of 11 January, his barge was upset by"...three heavy rollers ..." and all on board plunged into the icy surf. Aroostook, Hartford, and two other warships launched boats to rescue the struggling sailors. Her boat, ignoring the great danger, managed to pick up one floundering seaman and Hartford's saved two more. Admiral Bell, Lt. Comdr. John H. Reed, and 10 enlisted men drowned.

Aroostook soon returned to Hong Kong and turned her attention to operations against pirates along the coast of China. She also occasionally served as a dispatch vessel carrying American diplomats between ports of the Far East.

==== Japanese protection mission ====
In the spring of 1869, the gunboat returned to Japanese waters to protect American citizens endangered by fighting during the Japanese civil war. She continued to perform this duty until after the shōgun's forces capitulated late in June.

=== Final decommission and Oneida rescue mission ===
However, Aroostook—which had been hastily constructed of inadequately seasoned timber—had aged prematurely and, because of her badly rotted hull, was unable to return home safely. As a result, she was condemned by a board of inspection and survey, decommissioned at Hong Kong on 18 September 1869, and sold sometime in October 1869.

However, she performed one more service for the United States Navy. After word reached Yokohama that the British P&O steamer City of Bombay had struck Oneida on the evening of 24 January 1870, sinking that American screw sloop of war, the senior United States naval officer in port chartered the former USS Aroostook to search for any survivors of the accident. Manned in part by volunteers from the Russian man-of-war Vsadnik, the former American gunboat steamed waters in the general vicinity of the collision for over a month seeking traces of the Oneida's crew.

No records of Aroostook's subsequent career have survived.

== See also ==
- List of steam gunboats of the United States Navy
- Blockade runners of the American Civil War
