= 5th Virginia Infantry Battalion =

Confederate States Army unit

5th Battalion, Virginia Volunteer Infantry
- Flag of Virginia, 1861
- Active: May 1861 – September 1862
- Disbanded: September 1862
- Country: Confederacy
- Allegiance: Confederate States of America
- Branch: Confederate States Army
- Role: Heavy Artillery; Infantry
- Nickname: Archer's Battalion
- Engagements: American Civil War: Peninsula Campaign; Seven Days' Battles; Battle of Cedar Creek; Second Battle of Bull Run

The 5th Battalion, Virginia Infantry, also known as the Archer's Battalion, was raised in Virginia for service in the Confederate States Army during the American Civil War and served as infantry. It fought mostly with the Army of Northern Virginia.

The battalion completed its organization at Richmond, Virginia, in May 1861. Its six companies were raised in the counties of Brunswick, Dinwiddie, Prince George, Henrico, and Greensville.

The unit served as heavy artillery along the James River, including at Fort Huger, before being attached to General Armistead's Brigade. During June 1862, it contained 213 men, was active in the Seven Days' Battles, then disbanded in September. Many of its members transferred to the 53rd Virginia Infantry regiment.

The field officers were Lieutenant Colonel F.H. Archer, and Majors William R. Foster and John P. Wilson Jr.

== See also ==
- List of Virginia Civil War units
