= Andrew Gray (surveyor) =

Andrew Belcher Gray (July 6, 1820 – April 16, 1862) was an American surveyor.

Born in Norfolk, Virginia, he studied engineering and surveying under Andrew Talcott, and surveyed the Mississippi Delta with him in 1839, before joining the Texas Navy as a midshipman. Remaining in the Republic of Texas, he was appointed a surveyor for the Texas-U.S. boundary commission led by Memucan Hunt. In 1844–1846, he served as U.S. government mineral surveyor, mapping the rich copper country of the Keweenaw Peninsula in Michigan and leasing out the government's mineral lands.

He returned to the new state of Texas during the Mexican–American War. Following the war, he served as chief surveyor of the US–Mexican commission which established the border after the Treaty of Guadalupe Hidalgo. When the U. S. Commissioner, John Bartlett, a Yankee, gave away the Rio Grande's Mesilla Valley because of a map error, which had been disputed by the Mexican Delegation, the fiery Southerner Gray opposed the unacceptable compromise, and was removed from the commission (as surveyor, his signature was required for approval of the compromise). He was replaced by friend William Emory, but not before Gray had finished surveying the original U.S.–Mexico boundary from the Rio Grande, over the Black Range, down the Gila River to its junction with the Colorado River, and across the desert of southern California to the Pacific Ocean at San Diego. The U.S. Congress reviewing the case sided with Gray, but in the interim the President had sent James Gadsden to Mexico City to buy not just the Mesilla Valley of New Mexico but what is now known as the Gadsden Purchase from Mexico. Gray's claim in his survey report that it was the best route for a railroad influenced the Senate to approve the Treaty in 1854.

Earlier, in 1849, he had accompanied the boundary commission to San Diego. The town of San Diego was then located at the foot of Presidio Hill, more than a mile from navigable water. When Gray's party camped near what is now H Street in Downtown San Diego, he realized that a location near San Diego Bay would make a much better site for a city. He proposed the idea to several San Diegans and found a receptive audience in William Heath Davis. Davis recruited several other investors and founded New Town San Diego. Gray was a partner in the project and built a cottage in the area. New Town was unsuccessful due to a financial depression in 1851, a lack of fresh water, and hostility from the original settlers in Old Town and La Playa. An army facility was maintained in the area throughout the 1850s but was then abandoned. However, Gray's idea was successfully revived by Alonzo Horton in 1867, and by 1880 the main focus of the city of San Diego moved to the waterfront area identified by Gray, where it remains to this day.

In 1852 he was recruited by the Texas Western Railroad to lead a survey from San Antonio westwards towards the Colorado River and California; his journals were published in 1856 as Survey of a Route for the Southern Pacific R.R. on the 32nd Parallel. In 1857, he was back in Arizona promoting copper mines, at Ajo and the future Ray-Hayden-Winkelman area, Arizona. Because of transportation costs and Apache attacks, the mines were only begun to be opened before war clouds loomed (in the twentieth century the Ray and Ajo open pits were among the largest copper producers in the country). He had settled in Tucson, Arizona, continued his surveying business, before joining the Confederate States Army on the outbreak of the American Civil War. He worked as an engineer on fortifications along the Mississippi River, and was killed in 1862 when the boiler of a steamboat he was traveling on exploded. He left a wife and three daughters.
