= Andrew Talcott =

American civil engineer (1797–1883)

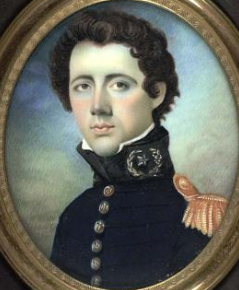
- Born: April 27, 1797; Glastonbury, Connecticut
- Died: April 22, 1883 (aged 85); Richmond, Virginia
- Occupation: Civil Engineer

Andrew Talcott (1797–1883) was an American civil engineer and close friend of Civil War General Robert E. Lee. He did not serve during the Civil War, as he could not fight against the Union, nor fight against his brothers in the South. He traveled to Veracruz, Mexico, to work on the railroad. Coming back with the President to New York for supplies he was arrested and placed at Fort Lafayette accused of being a spy for the Confederate States of America. He was moved to Fort Warren in Boston harbor under orders of General John E. Wool. General John A. Dix was placed in the command of the Eastern Military Department. Knowing Captain Andrew well and believing his loyalty to the Union he was released.

== Early life ==
Talcott was born on April 20, 1797, in Glastonbury, Connecticut. He attended West Point and graduated second in his class in 1818. As an officer in the Corps of Engineers, he was garrisoned at Fort Atkinson and explored the passage to Fort Snelling in 1820. Some notable relatives include his brother General George Talcott, Chief of the Ordnance Corps from 1848 to 1851; granddaughter Lucia Beverly Talcott (born 1865), who married the famous statistician and inventor Herman Hollerith in 1890; first cousin three times removed Joseph Talcott, Governor of the Colony of Connecticut from 1724 to 1741; and third great-grandfather John Talcott, one of the founders of Hartford, Connecticut.

== Career ==
Talcott's career was as a military and civil engineer building forts, roads and railroads both in the States and Mexico. He started the 1824 construction of Fort Adams in Newport, Rhode Island. In 1833 he extended a previously invented method of finding latitudinal direction. He rediscovered the method to determine a place's latitude from the stars, a method originally invented by the Danish astronomer Peder Horrebow. On further developing Horrebow's method, it subsequently came to be known as the Horrebow-Talcott Method. The so-called Horrebow-Talcott method fixed latitude "by observing differences of zenith distances of stars culminating within a short time of each other, and at nearly the same altitude, on opposite sides of the zenith."

He was hired as superintending engineer for construction on the Hampton Roads at Fort Calhoun and Fort Monroe becoming a superior and friend to the future general, Robert E. Lee and married Harriet Randolph Hackley at Norfolk, Virginia, in 1832. (His wife was also to become a close platonic companion to General Lee.) Talcott surveyed the Ohio-Michigan border with Lee in the spring of 1835. With the rank of captain, he resigned his commission in 1836 and by 1839 he was a civil engineer and surveyor of the Mississippi river delta together with a young A. B. (Andrew) Gray. In 1838, Talcott was elected as a member to the American Philosophical Society.

Talcott was considered for the post of Superintendent of the Coast Survey which was subsequently filled by Alexander Bache in 1843, but he went on to supervise construction of the Richmond and Danville Railroad in 1849, where he was later appointed general manager. Talcott became chief engineer and superintendent of the Ohio and Mississippi Railroad and later appeared as a consultant at the Coroner's jury for the Desjardins Canal disaster, Hamilton, Ontario, 1857.

== Mexican Railroad ==
He was engaged as an engineer late in 1857 by A. Escandon who, with English financing, planned to connect Veracruz with Mexico City by rail via Cordova and Orizaba, supervising W. W. Finney of the Pony Express. When Escandon purchased the fourth concession from Mosso brothers in 1856, two routes were considered and Talcott was assigned the far more difficult southern passage probably due financial stakes held near Orizaba by the project's investors. The Northern passage was explored by Pascual Almazán. It was supposed to be the steepest railway undertaken up to that time, rising 211 feet per mile (40.0 m/km) in a distance of 23 miles (37 km) and to span the Metlac River was an English-made iron bridge 380 feet (120 m) high.

== Civil War ==
At the request of Lee, Talcott accepted the positions of Colonel and State Engineer of Virginia in 1861. Talcott was charged with the coastal defense of Richmond and James River. After rebuilding the star-shaped Fort Boykin and building Fort Huger, the forts were later crippled by the ironclad corvette USS Galena's squadron. Talcott was arrested in New York, March 1863, only to be held at Fort Warren in Massachusetts as a Mexican citizen. He returned to a French-reorganized Mexican project in the late 1860s under a new concession where he remained until Juárez defeated Maximilian's conservative regime in 1867.

== Personal life ==
As a co-claimant he filed an unsuccessful suit before the Supreme Court in 1853, regarding Florida land deeded to his father-in-law Richard S. Hackley by the Duke of Alagon in 1819. In his later years, along with his son, Thomas Mann Randolph Talcott, Talcott invested in development in Bon Air, VA.

== Death ==
Talcott died on Sunday, April 22, 1883, at his residence, 519 East Leigh Street in Richmond, Virginia, at the age of 85 and was remembered in his obituary for building the Richmond and Danville Railroad.
