= Peninsula campaign =

1862 Union offensive in southeast Virginia during the American Civil War

- Part of the American Civil War
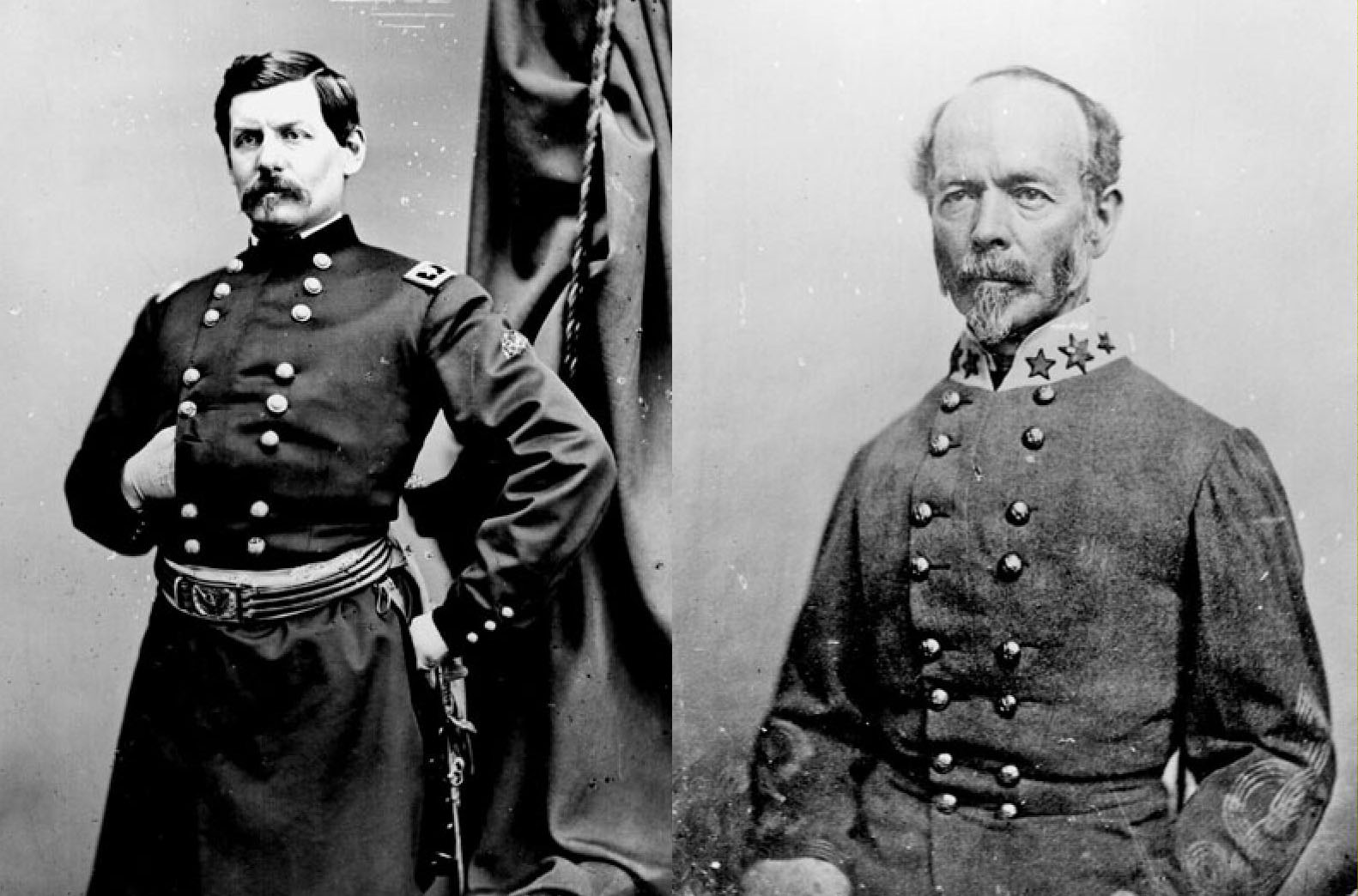
- George B. McClellan and Joseph E. Johnston, respective commanders of the Union and Confederate armies in the Peninsula campaign
Date	March – July 1862
Location	Virginia Peninsula, between the York and James Rivers 37°16′26″N 76°36′35″W
Result	Confederate victory

Belligerents
United States	Confederate States of America

Commanders and leaders
George B. McClellan	Joseph E. Johnston; Gustavus Woodson Smith; Robert E. Lee; John B. Magruder

Units involved
Army of the Potomac	Army of Northern Virginia

Strength
102,236 (May 20); 105,857 (June 20); 88,445 (July 10)	94,813 (May 31); 112,220 (June 26); 74,065 (July 20)

Casualties and losses
23,119	29,298

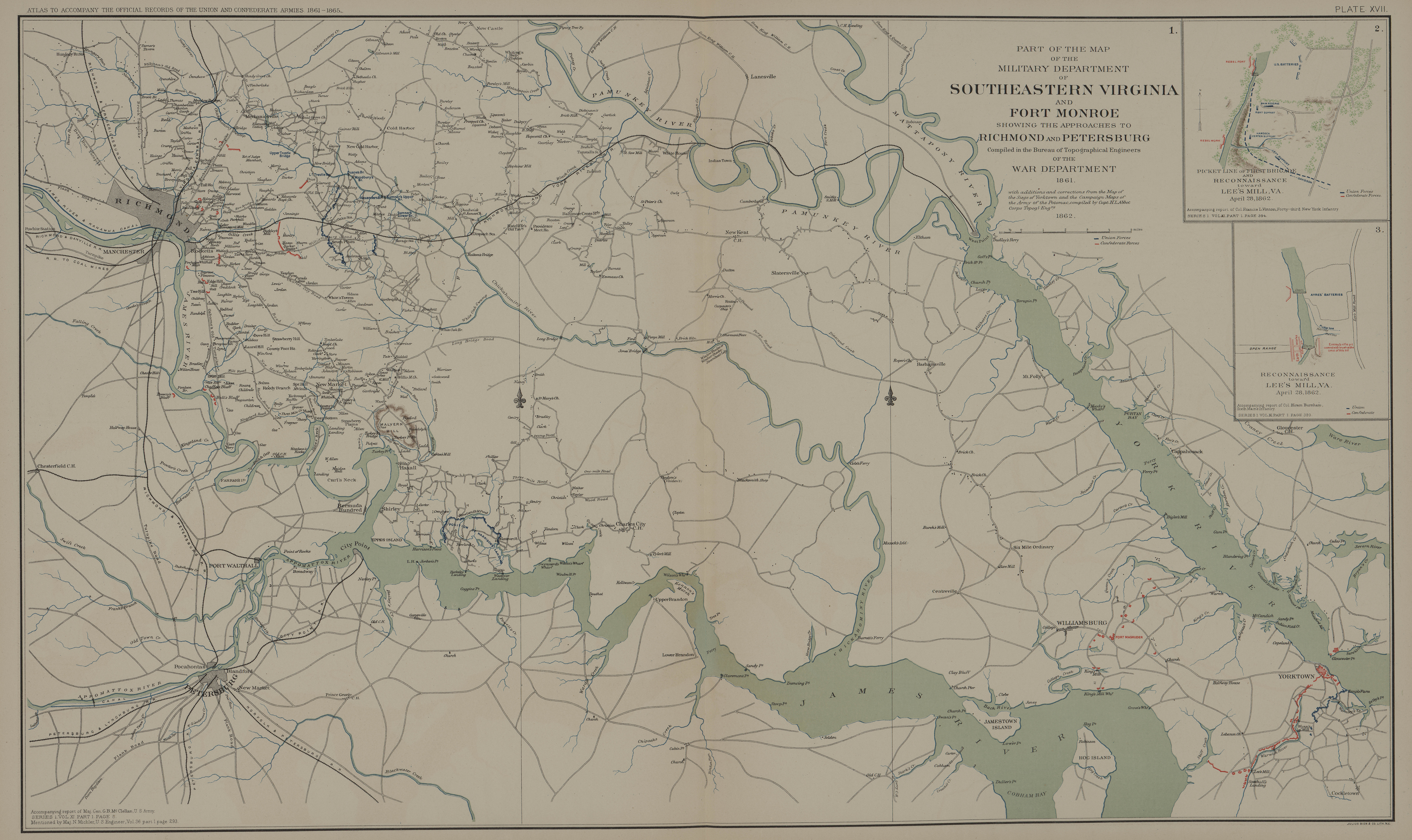
Peninsula campaign, map of Southeastern Virginia

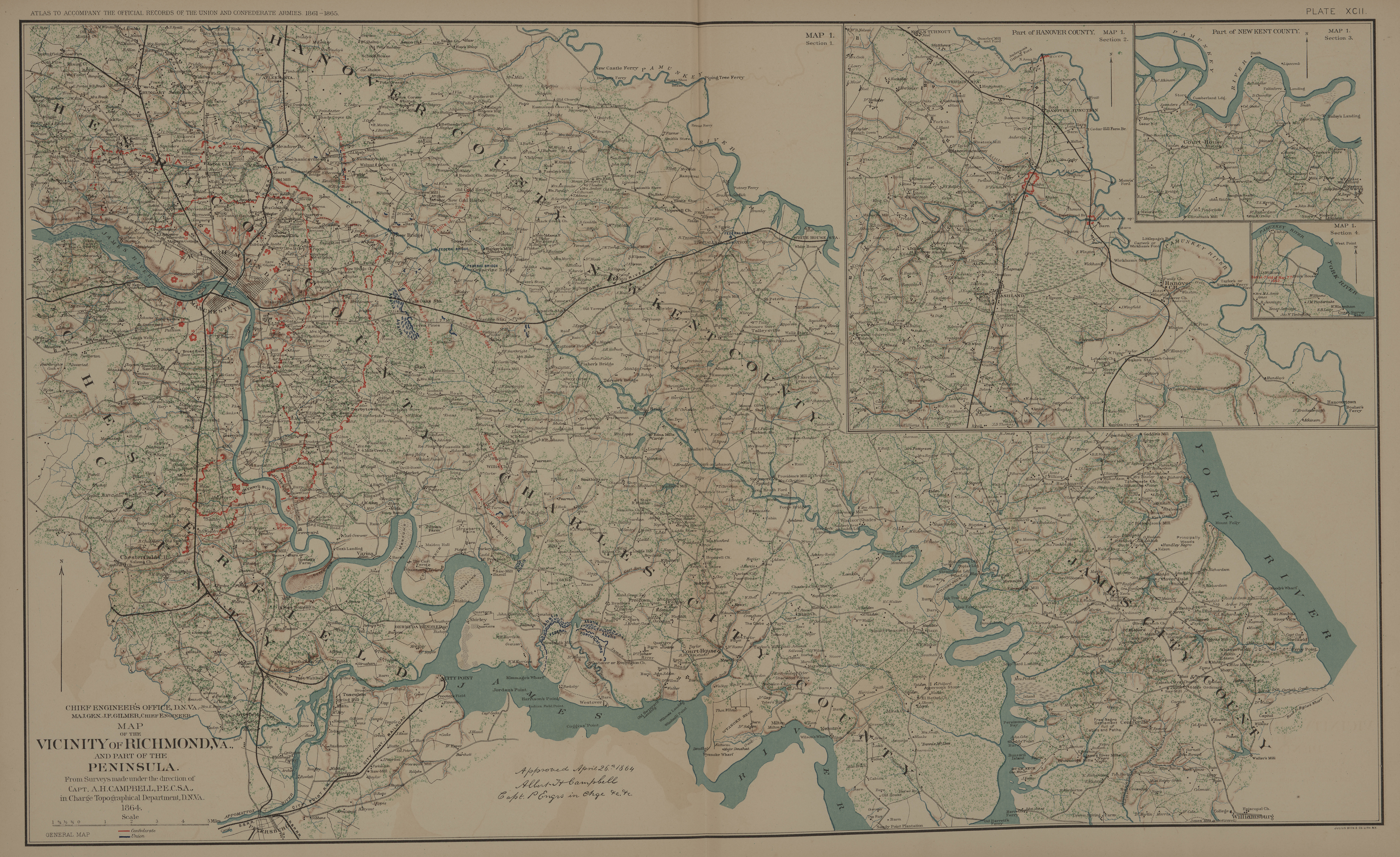
Peninsula campaign, map of Southeastern Virginia (additional map)

The Peninsula campaign (also known as the Peninsular campaign) of the American Civil War was a major Union operation launched in southeastern Virginia from March to July 1862, the first large-scale offensive in the Eastern Theater. The operation, commanded by Major General George B. McClellan, was an amphibious turning movement against the Confederate States Army in Northern Virginia, intended to capture the Confederate capital of Richmond. Despite the fact that Confederate spy Thomas Nelson Conrad had obtained documents describing McClellan's battle plans from a double agent in the War Department, McClellan was initially successful against the equally cautious General Joseph E. Johnston, but the emergence of the more aggressive General Robert E. Lee turned the subsequent Seven Days Battles into a humiliating Union defeat.

McClellan landed his army at Fort Monroe and moved northwest, up the Virginia Peninsula. Confederate Brigadier General John B. Magruder's defensive position on the Warwick Line caught McClellan by surprise. His hopes for a quick advance foiled, McClellan ordered his army to prepare for a siege of Yorktown. Just before the siege preparations had been completed, the Confederates, now under the direct command of Johnston, began a withdrawal toward Richmond. The first heavy fighting of the campaign occurred during the Battle of Williamsburg in which the Union troops managed some tactical victories, but the Confederates continued their withdrawal. An amphibious flanking movement to Eltham's Landing was ineffective in cutting off the Confederate retreat. During the Battle of Drewry's Bluff, an attempt by the US Navy to reach Richmond by way of the James River was repulsed.

As McClellan's army reached the outskirts of Richmond, a minor battle occurred at Hanover Court House, but it was followed by a surprise attack by Johnston at the Battle of Seven Pines or Fair Oaks. The battle was inconclusive, with heavy casualties, but it had lasting effects on the campaign. Johnston was wounded by a Union artillery shell fragment on May 31 and replaced the next day by the more aggressive Robert E. Lee, who reorganized his army and prepared for offensive action in the final battles of June 25 to July 1, which are popularly known as the Seven Days Battles. The result was that the Union army was unable to enter Richmond, and both armies remained intact.

== Background ==
=== Military situation ===
On August 20, 1861, Maj. Gen. George B. McClellan formed the Army of the Potomac, with himself as its first commander. During the summer and fall, McClellan brought a high degree of organization to his new army, and greatly improved its morale by his frequent trips to review and encourage his units. It was a remarkable achievement, in which he came to personify the Army of the Potomac and reaped the adulation of his men. He created defenses for Washington that were almost impregnable, consisting of 48 forts and strong points, with 480 guns manned by 7,200 artillerists.

On November 1, 1861, Gen. Winfield Scott retired and McClellan became general in chief of all the Union armies. The president expressed his concern about the "vast labor" involved in the dual role of army commander and general in chief, but McClellan responded, "I can do it all."

On January 12, 1862, McClellan revealed his intentions to transport the Army of the Potomac by ship to Urbanna, Virginia, on the Rappahannock River, outflanking the Confederate forces near Washington, and proceeding 50 miles (80 km) overland to capture Richmond. On January 27, Lincoln issued an order that required all of his armies to begin offensive operations by February 22, Washington's birthday. On January 31, he issued a supplementary order for the Army of the Potomac to move overland to attack the Confederates at Manassas Junction and Centreville. McClellan immediately replied with a 22-page letter objecting in detail to the president's plan and advocating instead his Urbanna plan, which was the first written instance of the plan's details being presented to the president. Although Lincoln believed his plan was superior, he was relieved that McClellan finally agreed to begin moving, and reluctantly approved. On March 8, doubting McClellan's resolve, Lincoln called a council of war at the White House in which McClellan's subordinates were asked about their confidence in the Urbanna plan. They expressed their confidence to varying degrees. After the meeting, Lincoln issued another order, naming specific officers as corps commanders to report to McClellan (who had been reluctant to do so prior to assessing his division commanders' effectiveness in combat, even though this would have meant his direct supervision of twelve divisions in the field).

Before McClellan could implement his plans, the Confederate forces under General Joseph E. Johnston withdrew from their positions before Washington on March 9, assuming new positions south of the Rappahannock, which completely nullified the Urbanna strategy. McClellan retooled his plan so that his troops would disembark at Fort Monroe, Virginia, and advance up the Virginia Peninsula to Richmond. However, McClellan came under extreme criticism from the press and the Congress when it was found that Johnston's forces had not only slipped away unnoticed, but had for months fooled the Union Army through the use of Quaker Guns.

A further complication for the campaign planning was the emergence of the first Confederate ironclad warship, CSS Virginia, which threw Washington into a panic and made naval support operations on the James River seem problematic. In the Battle of Hampton Roads (March 8–9, 1862), Virginia defeated wooden U.S. Navy ships blockading the harbor of Hampton Roads, Virginia, including the frigates USS Cumberland and USS Congress on March 8, calling into question the viability of any of the wooden ships in the world. The following day, the USS Monitor ironclad arrived at the scene and engaged with the Virginia, the famous first duel of the ironclads. The battle, although inconclusive, received worldwide publicity. After the battle, it was clear that ironclad ships were the future of naval warfare. Neither ship severely damaged the other; the only net result was keeping Virginia from attacking any more wooden ships.

On March 11, 1862, Lincoln removed McClellan as general-in-chief, leaving him in command of only the Army of the Potomac, ostensibly so that McClellan would be free to devote all his attention to the move on Richmond. Although McClellan was assuaged by supportive comments Lincoln made to him, in time he saw the change of command very differently, describing it as a part of an intrigue "to secure the failure of the approaching campaign."

== Opposing forces ==
=== Union ===
Union corps commanders
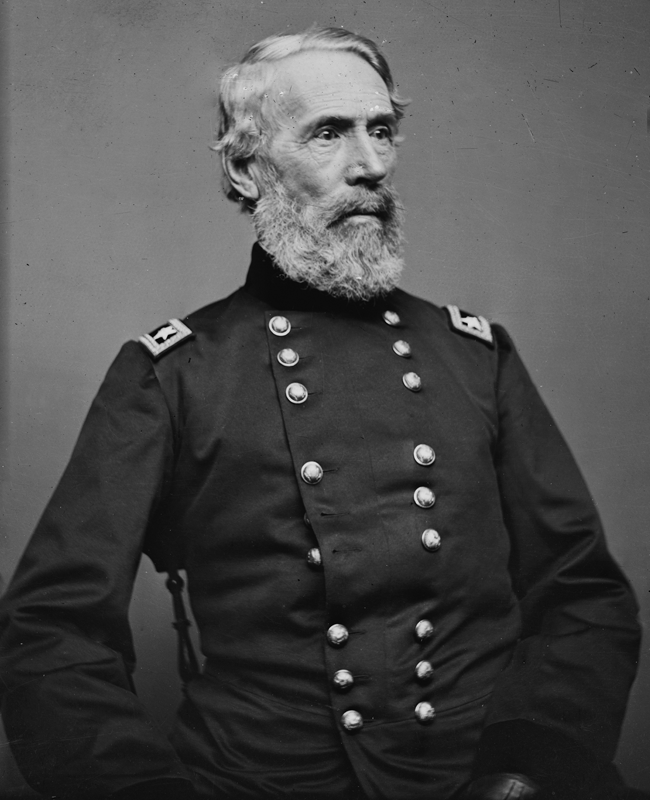
Brig. Gen.
Edwin V. Sumner

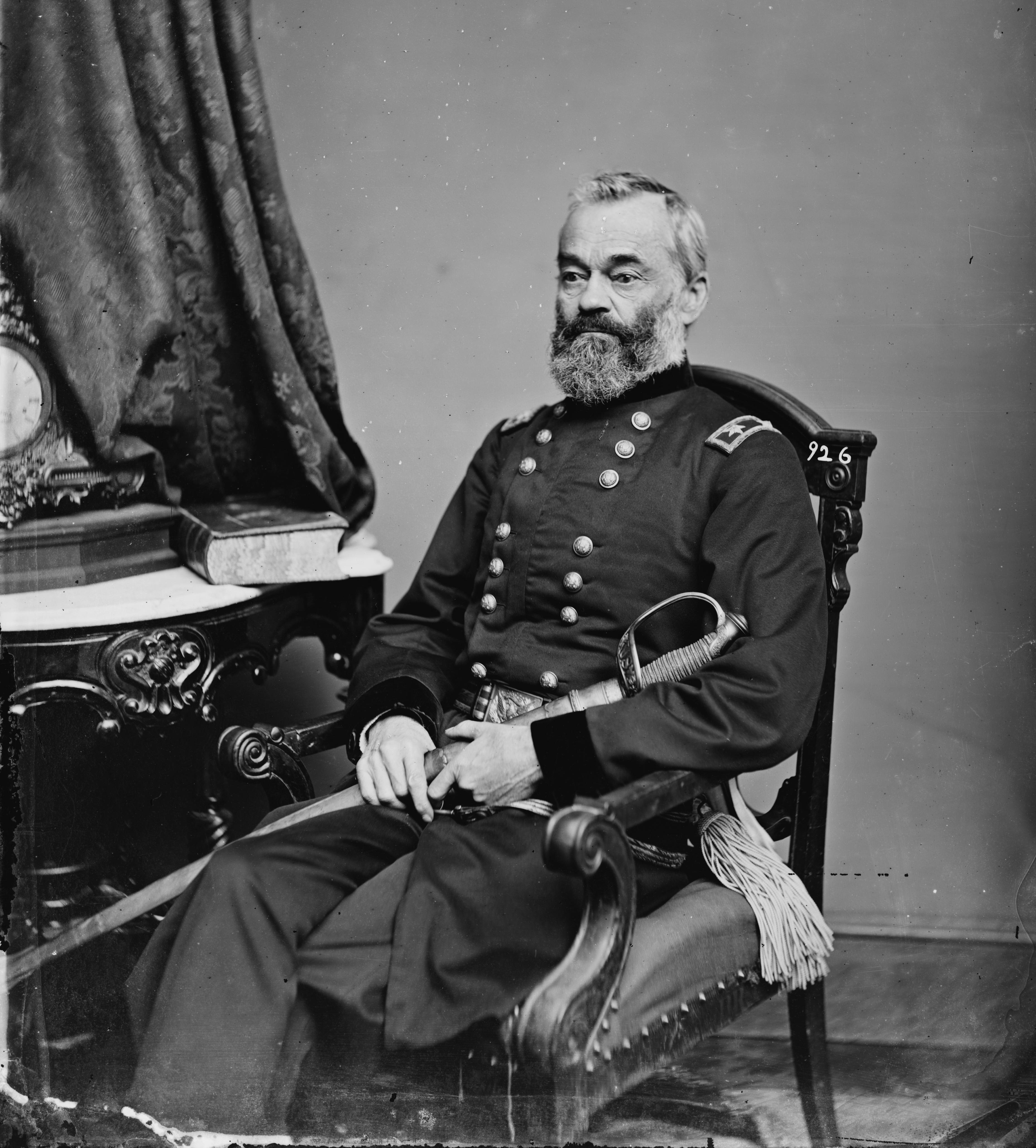
Brig. Gen.
Samuel P. Heintzelman

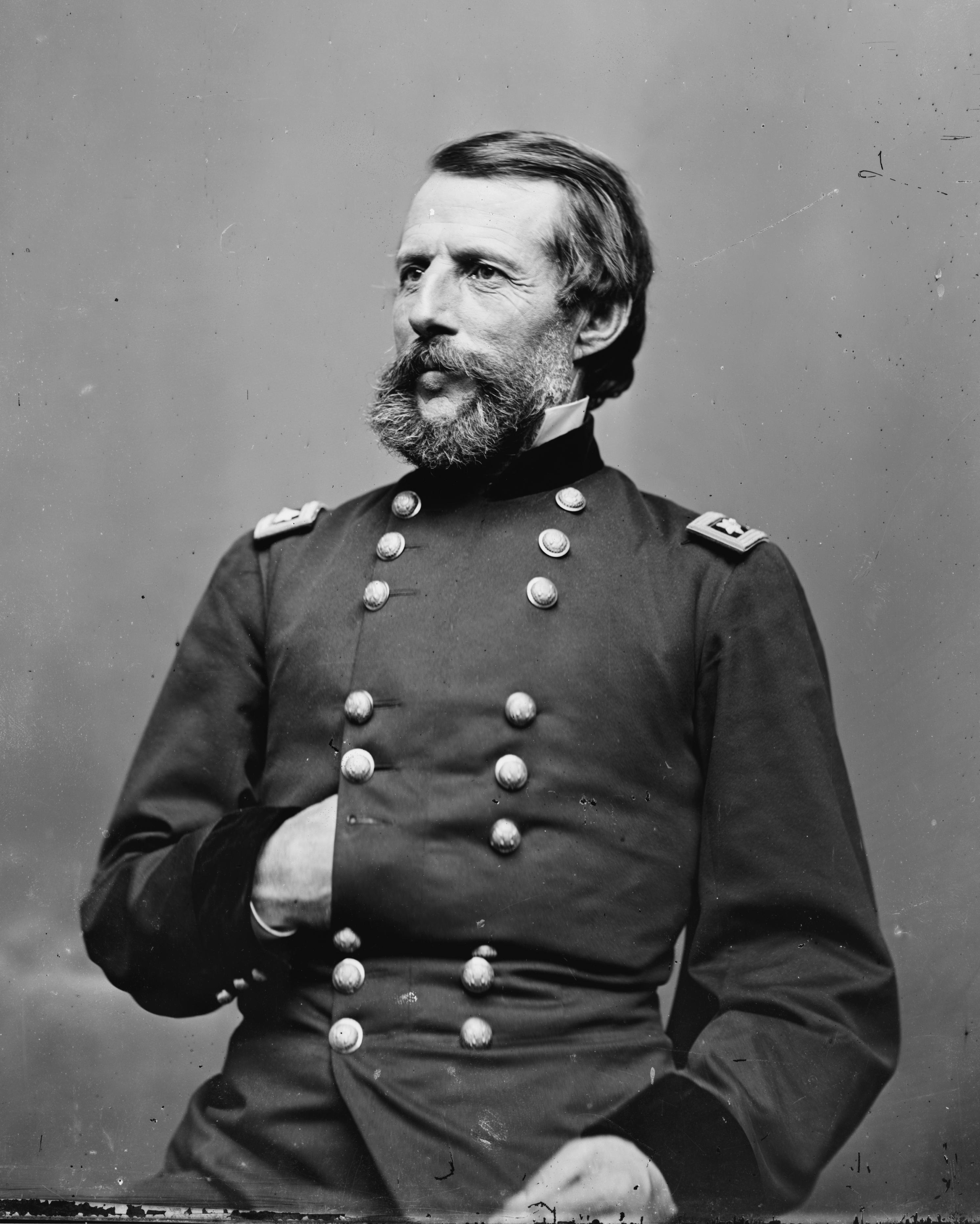
Brig. Gen.
Erasmus D. Keyes

The Army of the Potomac had approximately 50,000 men at Fort Monroe when McClellan arrived in late March, but this number grew to 121,500 before hostilities began. The army was organized into three corps and other units, as follows:

- II Corps, Brig. Gen. Edwin V. Sumner commanding: divisions of Brig. Gens. Israel B. Richardson and John Sedgwick
- III Corps, Brig. Gen. Samuel P. Heintzelman commanding: divisions of Brig. Gens. Fitz John Porter, Joseph Hooker, and Charles S. Hamilton
- IV Corps, Brig. Gen. Erasmus D. Keyes commanding: divisions of Brig. Gens. Darius N. Couch, William F. "Baldy" Smith, and Silas Casey
- 1st Division of the I Corps, Brig. Gen. William B. Franklin commanding
- Reserve infantry commanded by Brig. Gen. George Sykes
- Cavalry commanded by Brig. Gen. George Stoneman
- The garrison of Fort Monroe, 12,000 men under Maj. Gen. John E. Wool; Wool was quickly transferred to another department for duty in Baltimore after the War Department realized that he technically outranked McClellan.

=== Confederate ===
Confederate wing commanders
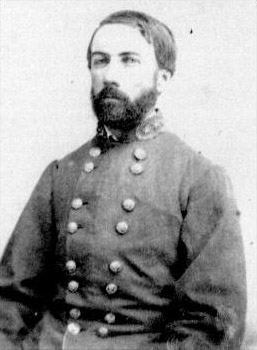
Maj. Gen.
D. H. Hill

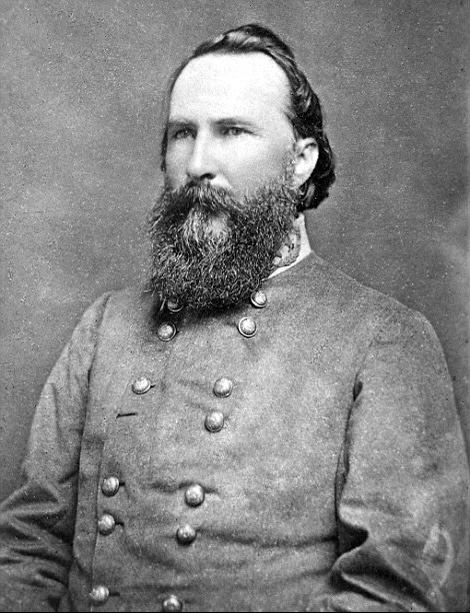
Lt. Gen.
James Longstreet

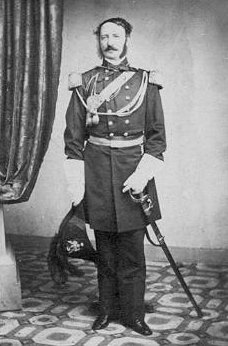
Maj. Gen.
John B. Magruder

On the Confederate side, Johnston's Army of Northern Virginia (newly named as of March 14) was organized into three wings, each composed of several brigades, as follows:

- Left Wing, Maj. Gen. D. H. Hill commanding: brigades of Brig. Gen. Robert E. Rodes, Winfield S. Featherston, Jubal A. Early, and Gabriel J. Raines
- Center Wing, Maj. Gen. James Longstreet commanding: brigades of Brig. Gens. A. P. Hill, Richard H. Anderson, George E. Pickett, Cadmus M. Wilcox, Raleigh E. Colston, and Roger A. Pryor
- Right Wing, Maj. Gen. John B. Magruder commanding: division of Brig. Gen. Lafayette McLaws (brigades of Brig. Gens. Paul J. Semmes, Richard Griffith, Joseph B. Kershaw, and Howell Cobb) and division of Brig. Gen. David R. Jones (brigades of Brig. Gens. Robert A. Toombs and George T. Anderson)
- Reserve force commanded by Maj. Gen. Gustavus W. Smith
- Cavalry commanded by Brig. Gen. J. E. B. Stuart

However, at the time the Army of the Potomac arrived, only Magruder's 11,000 men faced them on the Peninsula. The bulk of Johnston's force (43,000 men) were at Culpeper, 6,000 under Maj. Gen. Theophilus H. Holmes at Fredericksburg, and 9,000 under Maj. Gen. Benjamin Huger at Norfolk. In Richmond, General Robert E. Lee had returned from work on coastal fortifications in the Carolinas and on March 13 became the chief military adviser to Confederate President Jefferson Davis.

Forces in the Shenandoah Valley played an indirect role in the campaign. Approximately 50,000 men under Maj. Gens. Nathaniel P. Banks and Irvin McDowell were engaged chasing a much smaller force under Stonewall Jackson in the Valley Campaign. Jackson's expert maneuvering and tactical success in small battles kept the Union men from reinforcing McClellan, much to his dismay. He had planned to have 30,000 under McDowell to join him.

Magruder had prepared three defensive lines across the Peninsula. The first, about 12 miles (19 km) north of Fort Monroe, contained infantry outposts and artillery redoubts, but was insufficiently manned to prevent any Union advance. Its primary purpose was to shield information from the Union about a second line extending from Yorktown to Mulberry Island. This Warwick Line consisted of redoubts, rifle pits, and fortifications behind the Warwick River. By enlarging two dams on the river, the river was turned into a significant military obstacle in its own right. The third defensive line was a series of forts at Williamsburg, which waited unmanned for use by the army if it had to fall back from Yorktown.

== Initial movements ==
=== Movement to the Peninsula and the siege of Yorktown ===
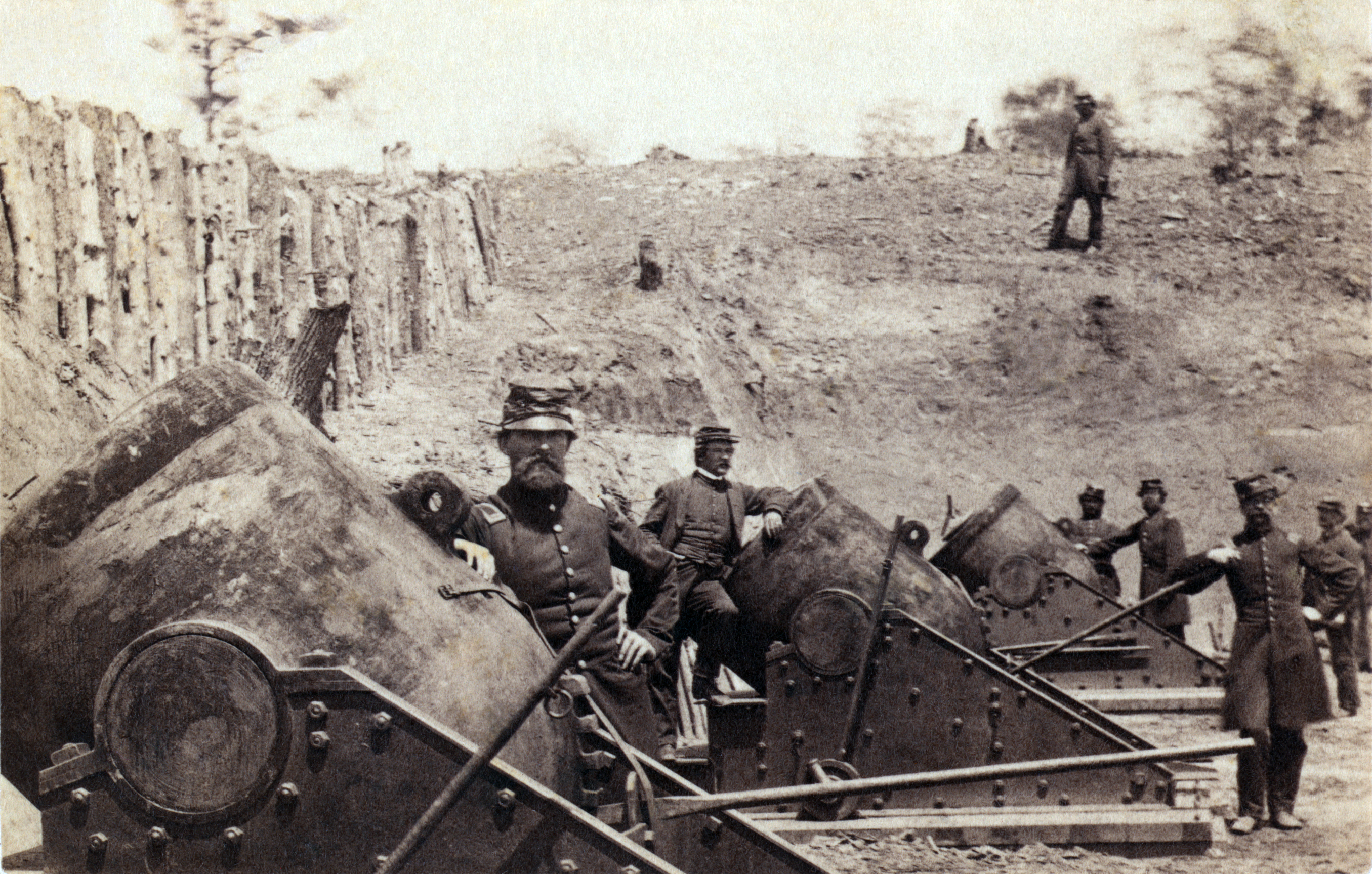
Federal Battery# 4 with 13-inch (330 mm) seacoast mortars, Model 1861, during the siege of Yorktown, Virginia, 1862

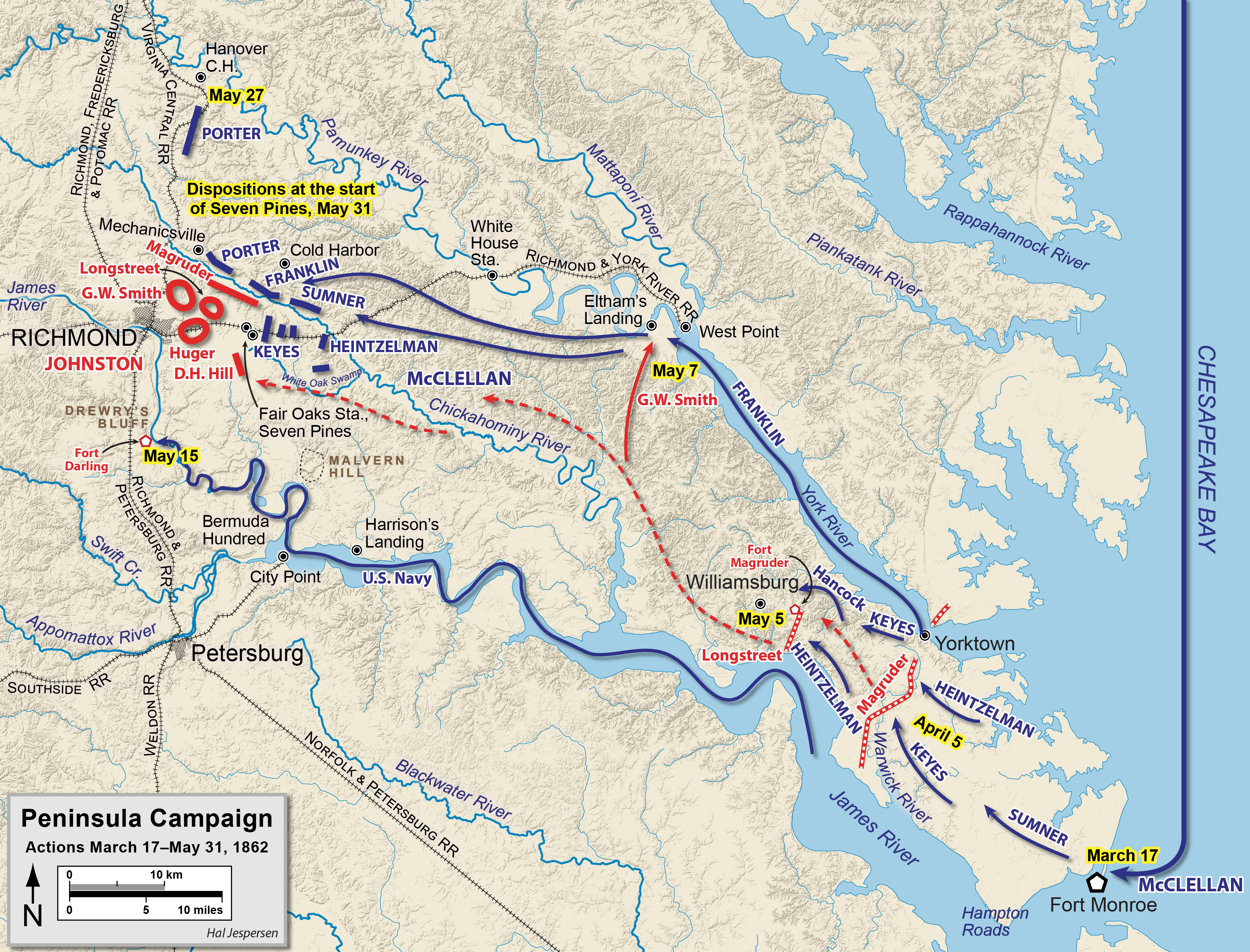
Movements and battles in the 1862 Peninsula Campaign, up through the start of the Battle of Seven Pines

Confederate
Union

McClellan's army began to sail from Alexandria on March 17. It was an armada that dwarfed all previous American expeditions, transporting 121,500 men, 44 artillery batteries, 1,150 wagons, over 15,000 horses, and tons of equipment and supplies. An English observer remarked that it was the "stride of a giant."

With the Virginia still in operation, the U.S. Navy could not assure McClellan that they could protect operations on either the James or the York, so his plan of amphibiously enveloping Yorktown was abandoned, and he ordered an advance up the Peninsula to begin April 4.

On April 5, the IV Corps of Brig. Gen. Erasmus D. Keyes made initial contact with Confederate defensive works at Lee's Mill, an area McClellan expected to move through without resistance. Magruder, a fan of theatrics, set up a successful deception campaign. By moving one company in circles through a glen, he gained the appearance of an endless line of reinforcements marching to relieve him. He also spread his artillery very far apart and had it fire sporadically at the Union lines. Federals were convinced that his works were strongly held, reporting that an army of 100,000 was in their path. As the two armies fought an artillery duel, reconnaissance indicated to Keyes the strength and breadth of the Confederate fortifications, and he advised McClellan against assaulting them. McClellan ordered the construction of siege fortifications and brought his heavy siege guns to the front. In the meantime, Gen. Johnston brought reinforcements for Magruder.

McClellan chose not to attack without more reconnaissance and ordered his army to entrench in works parallel to Magruder's and besiege Yorktown. McClellan reacted to Keyes's report, as well as to reports of enemy strength near the town of Yorktown, but he also received word that the I Corps, under Maj. Gen. Irvin McDowell, would be withheld for the defense of Washington, instead of joining him on the Peninsula as McClellan had planned. In addition to the pressure of Jackson's Valley campaign, President Lincoln believed that McClellan had left insufficient force to guard Washington and that the general had been deceptive in his reporting of unit strengths, counting troops as ready to defend Washington when they were actually deployed elsewhere. McClellan protested that he was being forced to lead a major campaign without his promised resources, but he moved ahead anyway. For the next 10 days, McClellan's men dug while Magruder steadily received reinforcements. By mid April, Magruder commanded 35,000 men, barely enough to defend his line.

Although McClellan doubted his numeric superiority over the enemy, he had no doubts about the superiority of his artillery. The siege preparations at Yorktown consisted of 15 batteries with more than 70 heavy guns. When fired in unison, these batteries would deliver over 7,000 pounds of ordnance onto the enemy positions with each volley.

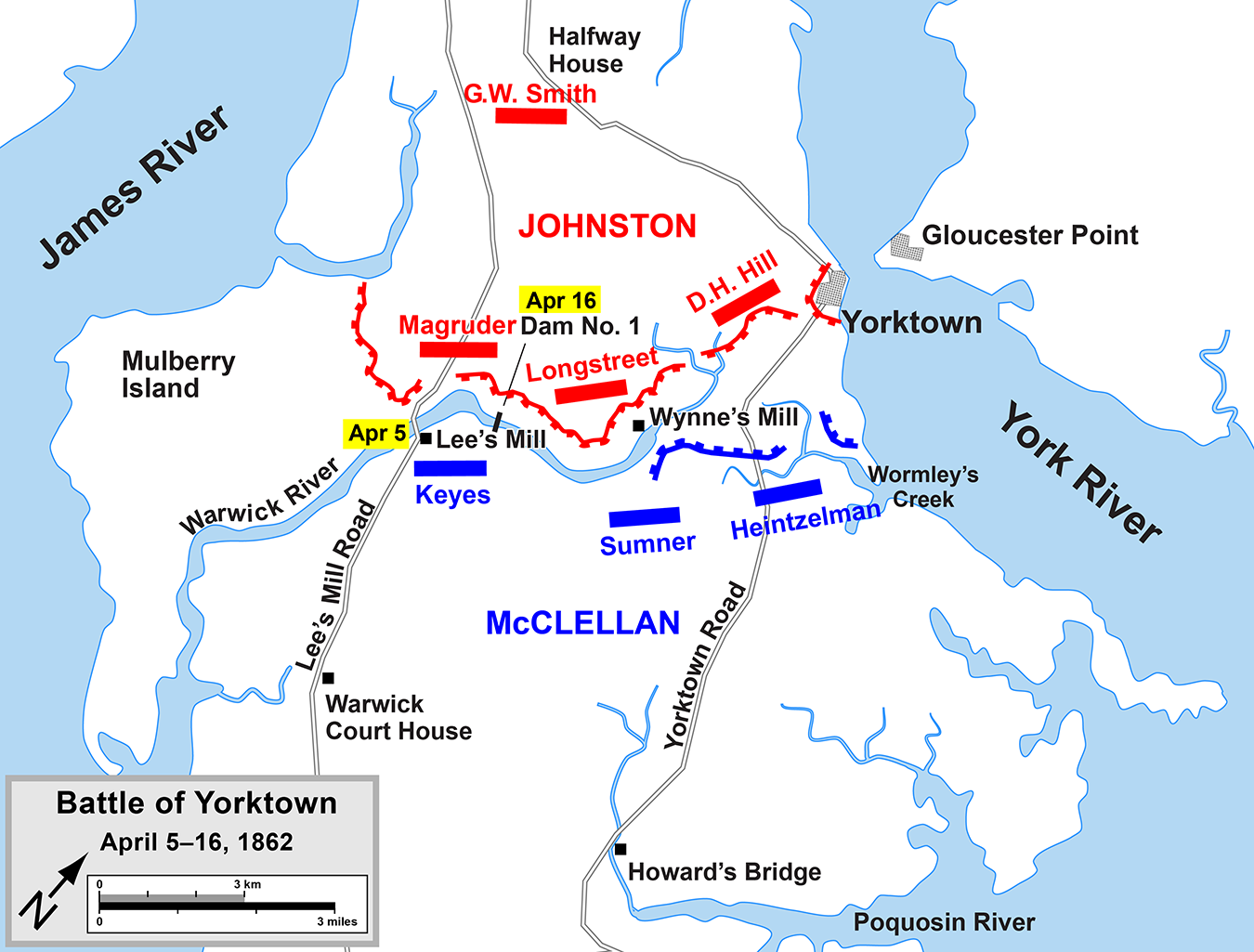
Siege of Yorktown

On April 16, Union forces probed a point in the Confederate line at Dam No. 1, on the Warwick River near Lee's Mill. Magruder realized the weakness of his position and ordered it strengthened. Three regiments under Brig. Gen. Howell Cobb, with six other regiments nearby, were improving their position on the west bank of the river overlooking the dam. McClellan became concerned that this strengthening might impede his installation of siege batteries. He ordered Brig. Gen. William F. "Baldy" Smith, a division commander in the IV Corps, to "hamper the enemy" in completing their defensive works.

At 3 p.m., four companies of the 3rd Vermont Infantry crossed the dam and routed the remaining defenders. Behind the lines, Cobb organized a defense with his brother, Colonel Thomas Cobb of the Georgia Legion, and attacked the Vermonters, who had occupied the Confederate rifle pits. Unable to obtain reinforcements, the Vermont companies withdrew across the dam, suffering casualties as they retreated. At about 5 p.m., Baldy Smith ordered the 6th Vermont to attack Confederate positions downstream from the dam while the 4th Vermont demonstrated at the dam itself. This maneuver failed as the 6th Vermont came under heavy Confederate fire and were forced to withdraw. Some of the wounded men were drowned as they fell into the shallow pond behind the dam.

For the remainder of April, the Confederates, now at 57,000 and under the direct command of Johnston, improved their defenses while McClellan undertook the laborious process of transporting and placing massive siege artillery batteries, which he planned to deploy on May 5. Johnston knew that the impending bombardment would be difficult to withstand, so began sending his supply wagons in the direction of Richmond on May 3. Escaped slaves reported that fact to McClellan, who refused to believe them. He was convinced that an army whose strength he estimated as high as 120,000 would stay and fight. On the evening of May 3, the Confederates launched a brief bombardment of their own and then fell silent. Early the next morning, Heintzelman ascended in one of Thaddeus Lowe's observation balloons and found that the Confederate earthworks were empty.

McClellan was stunned by the news. He sent cavalry under Brig. Gen. George Stoneman in pursuit and ordered Brig. Gen. William B. Franklin's division to reboard Navy transports, sail up the York River, and cut off Johnston's retreat.

== Battles ==
=== Williamsburg ===
By May 5, Johnston's army was making slow progress on muddy roads and Stoneman's cavalry was skirmishing with Brig. Gen. J.E.B. Stuart's cavalry, Johnston's rearguard. To give time for the bulk of his army to get free, Johnston detached part of his force to make a stand at a large earthen fortification, Fort Magruder, straddling the Williamsburg Road (from Yorktown), constructed earlier by Magruder. The Battle of Williamsburg was the first pitched battle of the Peninsula campaign, in which nearly 41,000 Union and 32,000 Confederates were engaged.

Brig. Gen. Joseph Hooker's 2nd Division of the III Corps was the lead infantry in the Union Army advance. They assaulted Fort Magruder and a line of rifle pits and smaller fortifications that extended in an arc southwest from the fort, but were repulsed. Confederate counterattacks, directed by Maj. Gen. James Longstreet, threatened to overwhelm Hooker's division, which had contested the ground alone since the early morning while waiting for the main body of the army to arrive. Hooker had expected Baldy Smith's division of the IV Corps, marching north on the Yorktown Road, to hear the sound of battle and come in on Hooker's right in support. However, Smith had been halted by Sumner more than a mile away from Hooker's position. He had been concerned that the Confederates would leave their fortifications and attack him on the Yorktown Road.

Longstreet's men did leave their fortifications, but they attacked Hooker, not Smith or Sumner. The brigade of Brig. Gen. Cadmus M. Wilcox applied strong pressure to Hooker's line. Hooker's retreating men were aided by the arrival of Brig. Gen. Philip Kearny's 3rd Division of the III Corps at about 2:30 p.m. Kearny ostentatiously rode his horse out in front of his picket lines to reconnoiter and urged his men forward by flashing his saber with his only arm. The Confederates were pushed off the Lee's Mill Road and back into the woods and the abatis of their defensive positions. There, sharp firefights occurred until late in the afternoon.

Brig. Gen. Winfield S. Hancock's 1st Brigade of Baldy Smith's division, which had marched a few miles to the Federal right and crossed Cub's Creek at the point where it was dammed to form the Jones's Mill pond, began bombarding Longstreet's left flank around noon. Maj. Gen. D. H. Hill, commanding Longstreet's reserve force, had previously detached a brigade under Brig. Gen. Jubal A. Early and posted them on the grounds of the College of William & Mary. Splitting his command, Early led two of his four regiments through the woods without performing adequate reconnaissance and found that they emerged not on the enemy's flank, but directly in front of Hancock's guns, which occupied two abandoned redoubts. He personally led the 24th Virginia Infantry on a futile assault and was wounded by a bullet through the shoulder.

Hancock had been ordered repeatedly by Sumner to withdraw his command back to Cub Creek, but he used the Confederate attack as an excuse to hold his ground. As the 24th Virginia charged, D. H. Hill emerged from the woods leading one of Early's other regiments, the 5th North Carolina. He ordered an attack before realizing the difficulty of his situation—Hancock's 3,400 infantrymen and eight artillery pieces significantly outnumbered the two attacking Confederate regiments, fewer than 1,200 men with no artillery support. He called off the assault after it had begun, but Hancock ordered a counterattack. After the battle, the counterattack received significant publicity as a major, gallant bayonet charge and McClellan's description of Hancock's "superb" performance gave him the nickname, "Hancock the Superb."

Confederate casualties at Williamsburg were 1,682, Union 2,283. McClellan miscategorized his first significant battle as a "brilliant victory" over superior forces. However, the defense of Williamsburg was seen by the South as a means of delaying the Federals, which allowed the bulk of the Confederate army to continue its withdrawal toward Richmond.

=== Eltham's Landing (or West Point) ===
After McClellan ordered Franklin's division to turn Johnston's army with an amphibious operation on the York River, it took two days just to board the men and equipment onto the ships, so Franklin was of no assistance to the Williamsburg action. But McClellan had high hopes for his turning movement, planning to send other divisions (those of Brig. Gens. Fitz John Porter, John Sedgwick, and Israel B. Richardson) by river after Franklin's. Their destination was Eltham's Landing on the south bank of the Pamunkey River across from West Point, a port on the York River, which was the terminus of the Richmond and York River Railroad. The landing was close to a key intersection on the road to New Kent Court House that was being used by Johnston's army on the afternoon of May 6.

Franklin's men came ashore in light pontoon boats and built a floating wharf to unload artillery and supplies. The work was continued by torchlight through the night and the only enemy resistance was a few random shots fired by Confederate pickets on the bluff above the landing, ending at about 10 p.m.

Johnston ordered Maj. Gen. G. W. Smith to protect the road to Barhamsville and Smith assigned the division of Brig. Gen. William H. C. Whiting and Hampton's Legion, under Col. Wade Hampton, to the task. On May 7, Franklin posted Brig. Gen. John Newton's brigade in the woods on either side of the landing road, supported in the rear by portions of two more brigades (Brig. Gens. Henry W. Slocum and Philip Kearny). Newton's skirmish line was pushed back as Brig. Gen. John Bell Hood's Texas Brigade advanced, with Hampton to his right.

As a second brigade followed Hood on his left, the Union troops retreated from the woods to the plain before the landing, seeking cover from the fire of Federal gunboats. Whiting employed artillery fire against the gunboats, but his guns had insufficient range, so he disengaged around 2 p.m. Union troops moved back into the woods after the Confederates left, but made no further attempt to advance. Although the action was tactically inconclusive, Franklin missed an opportunity to intercept the Confederate retreat from Williamsburg, allowing it to pass unmolested.

=== Norfolk and Drewry's Bluff ===
President Lincoln witnessed part of the campaign, having arrived at Fort Monroe on May 6 in the company of Secretary of War Edwin M. Stanton and Secretary of the Treasury Salmon P. Chase on the Treasury Department's revenue cutter Miami. Lincoln believed that the city of Norfolk was vulnerable and that control of the James was possible, but McClellan was too busy at the front to meet with the president. Exercising his direct powers as commander in chief, Lincoln ordered naval bombardments of Confederate batteries in the area on May 8 and set off in a small boat with his two Cabinet secretaries to conduct a personal reconnaissance on shore. Troops under the command of Maj. Gen. John E. Wool, the elderly commander of Fort Monroe, occupied Norfolk on May 10, encountering little resistance.

After the Confederate garrison at Norfolk was evacuated, Commodore Josiah Tattnall III knew that CSS Virginia had no home port and he could not navigate her deep draft through the shallow stretches of the James River toward Richmond, so she was scuttled on May 11 off Craney Island to prevent her capture. This opened the James River at Hampton Roads to Federal gunboats.

The only obstacle that protected Richmond from a river approach was Fort Darling on Drewry's Bluff, overlooking a sharp bend on the river 7 miles (11 km) down river from the city. The Confederate defenders, including marines, sailors, and soldiers, were supervised by Cammander Ebenezer Farrand of the navy and by Captain Augustus H. Drewry of the army, the owner of the property that bore his name. The eight cannons in the fort, including field artillery pieces and five naval guns, some salvaged from the Virginia, commanded the river for miles in both directions. Guns from the CSS Patrick Henry, including an 8-inch (200 mm) smoothbore, were just upriver and sharpshooters gathered on the river banks. An underwater obstruction of sunken steamers, pilings, debris, and other vessels connected by chains was placed just below the bluff, making it difficult for vessels to maneuver in the narrow river.

On May 15, a detachment of the U.S. Navy's North Atlantic Blockading Squadron, under the command of Commander John Rodgers steamed up the James River from Fort Monroe to test the Richmond defenses. At 7:45 a.m., the USS Galena closed to within 600 yards (550 m) of the fort and anchored, but before she could open fire, two Confederate rounds pierced the lightly armored vessel. The battle lasted over three hours and during that time, Galena remained almost stationary and took 45 hits. Her crew reported casualties of 14 dead or mortally wounded and 10 injured. Monitor was also a frequent target, but her heavier armor withstood the blows. Contrary to some reports, the Monitor, despite its squat turret, did not have difficulty bringing its guns to bear and fired steadily against the fort. The USS Naugatuck withdrew when her 100-pounder Parrott rifle exploded. The two wooden gunboats remained safely out of range of the big guns, but the captain of the USS Port Royal was wounded by a sharpshooter. Around 11 a.m. the Union ships withdrew to City Point.

The massive fort on Drewry's Bluff had blunted the Union advance just 7 miles (11 km) short of the Confederate capital. Rodgers reported to McClellan that it was feasible for the Navy to land troops as close as 10 miles (16 km) from Richmond, but the Union Army never took advantage of this observation.

=== Armies converge on Richmond ===
Johnston withdrew his 60,000 men into the Richmond defenses. Their defensive line began at the James River at Drewry's Bluff and extended counterclockwise so that his center and left were behind the Chickahominy River, a natural barrier in the spring when it turned the broad plains to the east of Richmond into swamps. Johnston's men burned most of the bridges over the Chickahominy and settled into strong defensive positions north and east of the city. McClellan positioned his 105,000-man army to focus on the northeast sector, for two reasons. First, the Pamunkey River, which ran roughly parallel to the Chickahominy, offered a line of communication that could enable McClellan to get around Johnston's left flank. Second, McClellan anticipated the arrival of McDowell's I Corps, scheduled to march south from Fredericksburg to reinforce his army, and thus needed to protect their avenue of approach.

The Army of the Potomac pushed slowly up the Pamunkey, establishing supply bases at Eltham's Landing, Cumberland Landing, and White House Landing. White House, the plantation of W.H.F. "Rooney" Lee, son of General Robert E. Lee, became McClellan's base of operations. Using the Richmond and York River Railroad, McClellan could bring his heavy siege artillery to the outskirts of Richmond. He moved slowly and deliberately, reacting to faulty intelligence that led him to believe the Confederates outnumbered him significantly. By the end of May, the army had built bridges across the Chickahominy and was facing Richmond, straddling the river, with one third of the Army south of the river, two thirds north. (This disposition, which made it difficult for one part of the army to reinforce the other quickly, would prove to be a significant problem in the upcoming Battle of Seven Pines).

New Union corps commanders
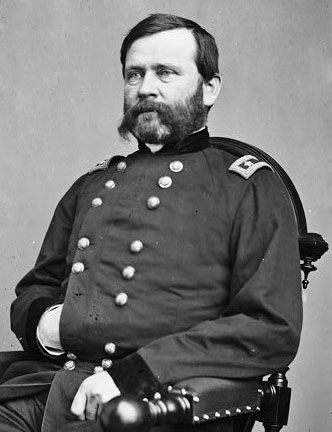
Brig. Gen.
William B. Franklin

On May 18, McClellan reorganized the Army of the Potomac in the field and promoted two major generals to corps command: Fitz John Porter to the new V Corps and William B. Franklin to the VI Corps. The army had 105,000 men in position northeast of the city, outnumbering Johnston's 60,000, but faulty intelligence from the detective Allan Pinkerton on McClellan's staff caused the general to believe that he was outnumbered two to one. Numerous skirmishes between the lines of the armies occurred from May 23 to May 26. Tensions were high in the city, particularly following the earlier sounds of the naval gun battle at Drewry's Bluff.

=== Hanover Court House ===
While skirmishing occurred all along the line between the armies, McClellan heard a rumor that a Confederate force of 17,000 was moving to Hanover Court House, north of Mechanicsville. If this were true, it would threaten the army's right flank and complicate the arrival of McDowell's reinforcements. A Union cavalry reconnaissance adjusted the estimate of the enemy strength to be 6,000, but it was still cause for concern. McClellan ordered Porter and his V Corps to deal with the threat.

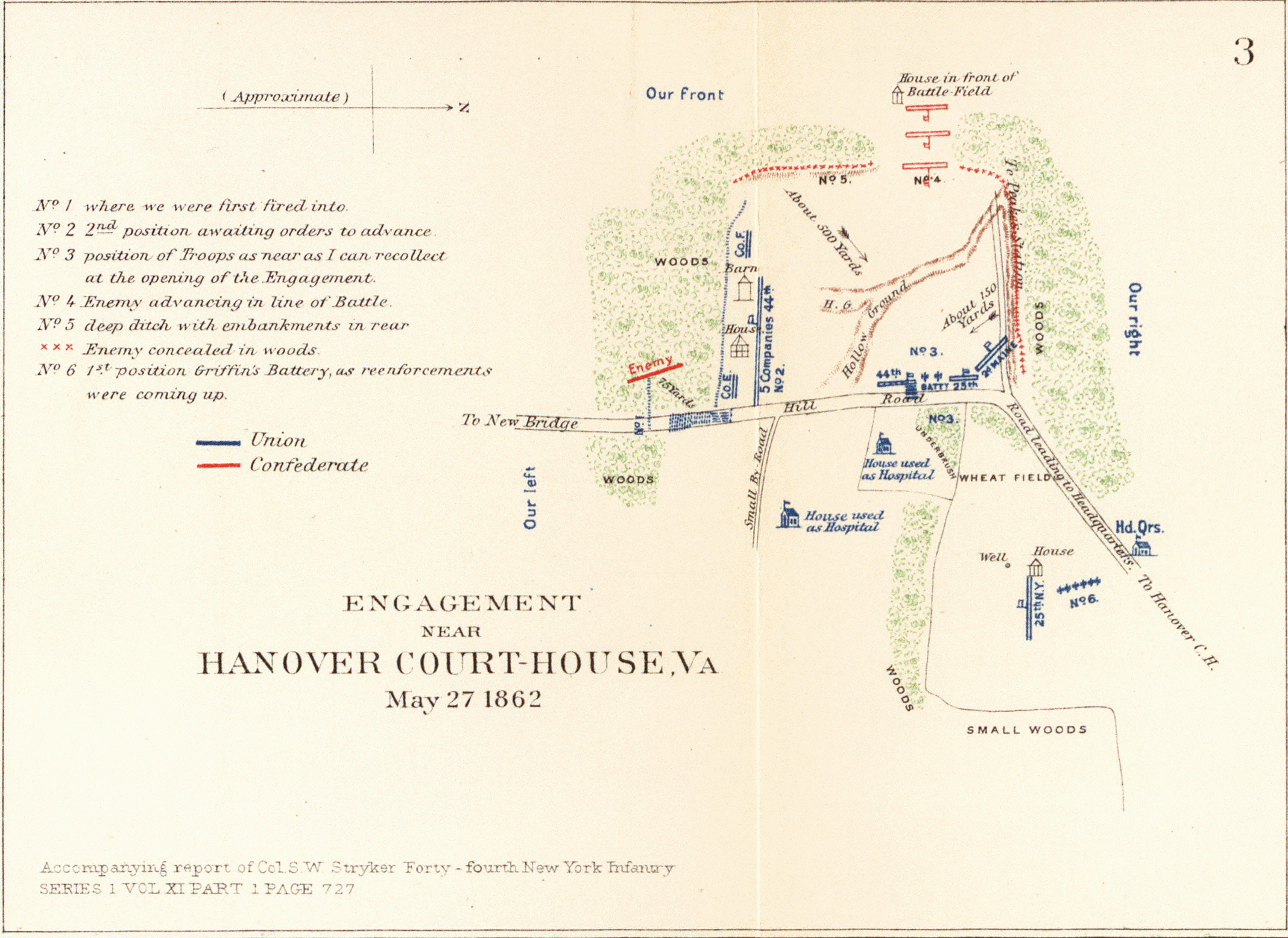
Engagement Near Hanover Court-House, Virginia

Porter departed on his mission at 4 a.m. on May 27 with his 1st Division, under Brig. Gen. George W. Morell, the 3rd Brigade of Brig. Gen. George Sykes's 2nd Division, under Col. Gouverneur K. Warren, and a composite brigade of cavalry and artillery led by Brig. Gen. William H. Emory, altogether about 12,000 men. The Confederate force, which actually numbered about 4,000 men, was led by Col. Lawrence O'Bryan Branch. They had departed from Gordonsville to guard the Virginia Central Railroad, taking up position at Peake's Crossing, 4 miles (6.4 km) southwest of the courthouse, near Slash Church. Another Confederate brigade was stationed 10 miles (16 km) north at Hanover Junction.

Porter's men approached Peake's Crossing in a driving rain. At about noon on May 27, his lead element skirmished briskly with the Confederates until Porter's main body arrived, driving the outnumbered Confederates up the road in the direction of the courthouse. Porter set out in pursuit with most of his force, leaving three regiments to guard the New Bridge and Hanover Court House Roads intersection. This movement exposed the rear of Porter's command to attack by the bulk of Branch's force, which Porter had mistakenly assumed was at Hanover Court House.

Branch also made a poor assumption—that Porter's force was significantly smaller than it turned out to be—and attacked. The initial assault was repulsed, but Martindale's force was eventually almost destroyed by the heavy fire. Porter quickly dispatched the two regiments back to the Kinney Farm. The Confederate line broke under the weight of thousands of new troops and they retreated back through Peake's Crossing to Ashland.

The estimates of Union casualties at Hanover Court House vary, from 355 (62 killed, 233 wounded, 70 captured) to 397. The Confederates left 200 dead on the field and 730 were captured by Porter's cavalry. McClellan claimed that Hanover Court House was yet another "glorious victory over superior numbers" and judged that it was "one of the handsomest things of the war." However, the reality of the outcome was that superior (Union) numbers won the day in a disorganized fight, characterized by misjudgments on both sides. The right flank of the Union army remained secure, although technically the Confederates at Peake's Crossing had not intended to threaten it. And McDowell's Corps did not need its roads kept clear because it never arrived—the defeat of Union forces at the First Battle of Winchester by Stonewall Jackson in the Shenandoah Valley caused the Lincoln administration to recall McDowell to Fredericksburg.

A greater impact than the actual casualties, according to Stephen W. Sears, was the effect on McClellan's preparedness for the next major battle, at Seven Pines and Fair Oaks four days later. During the absence of Porter, McClellan was reluctant to move more of his troops south of the Chickahominy, making his left flank a more attractive target for Johnston. He was also confined to bed, ill with a flare-up of his chronic malaria.

=== Seven Pines (or Fair Oaks) ===
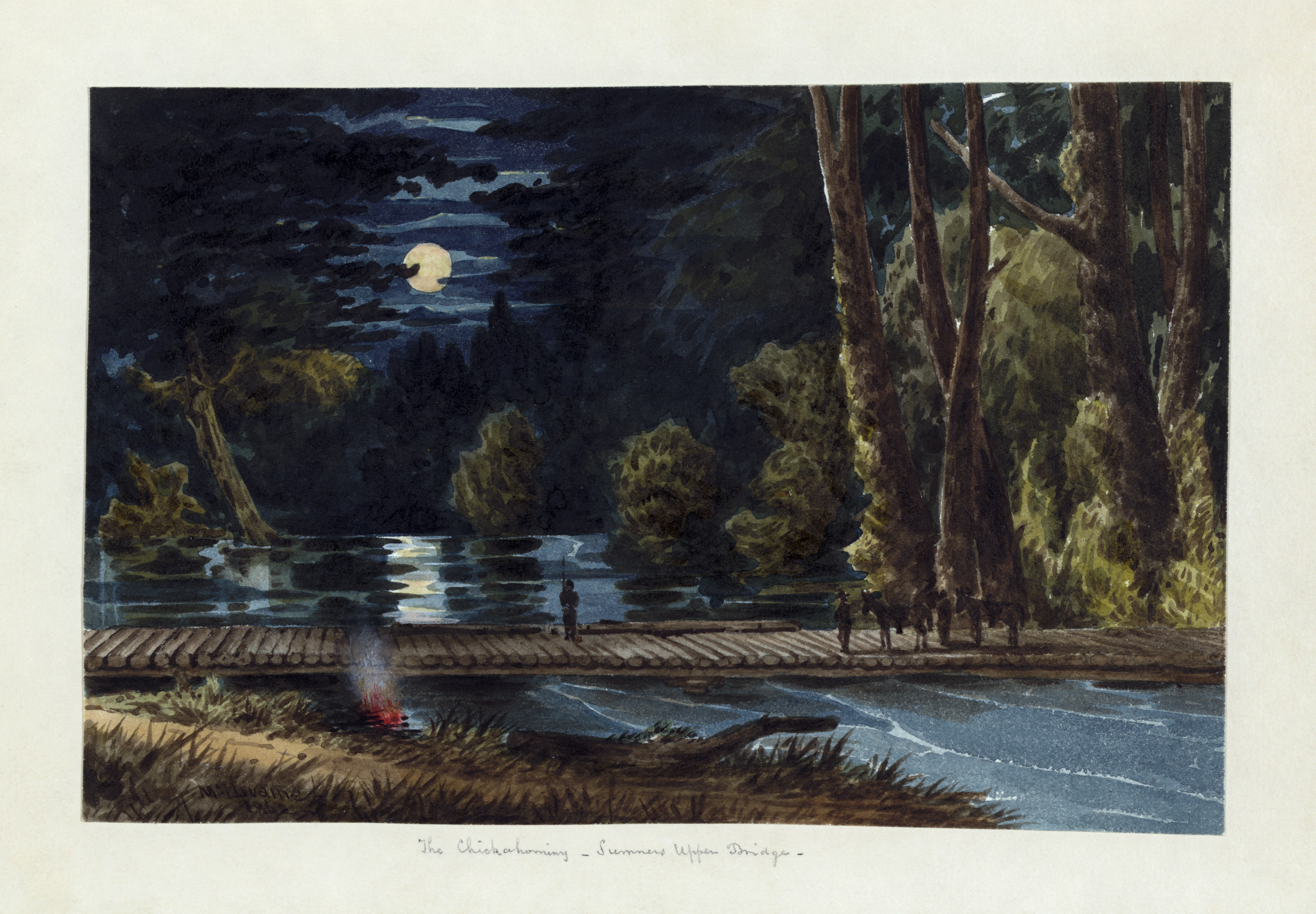
The Chickahominy - Sumner's Upper Bridge: 1862 watercolor by William McIlvaine

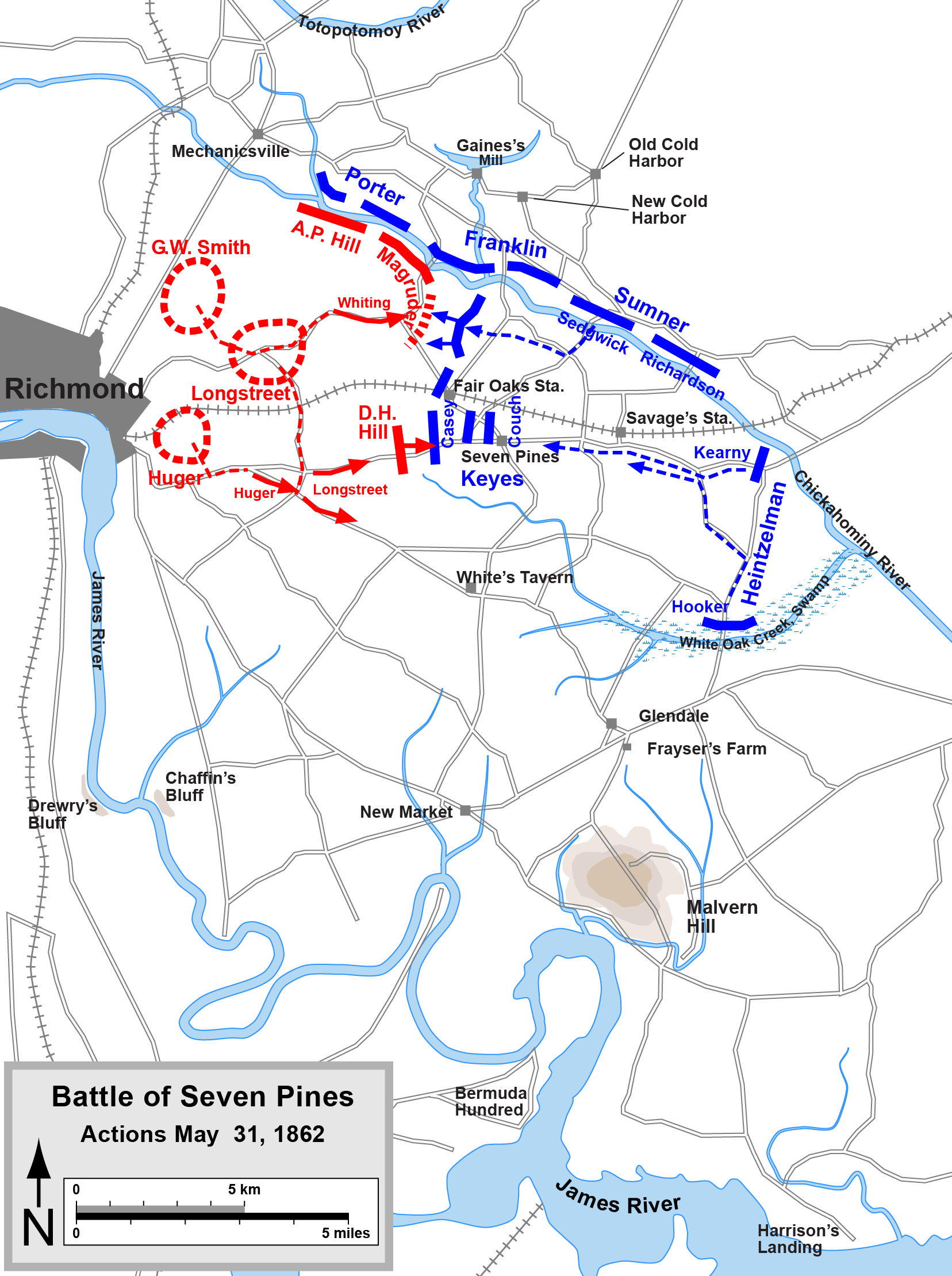
Battle of Seven Pines

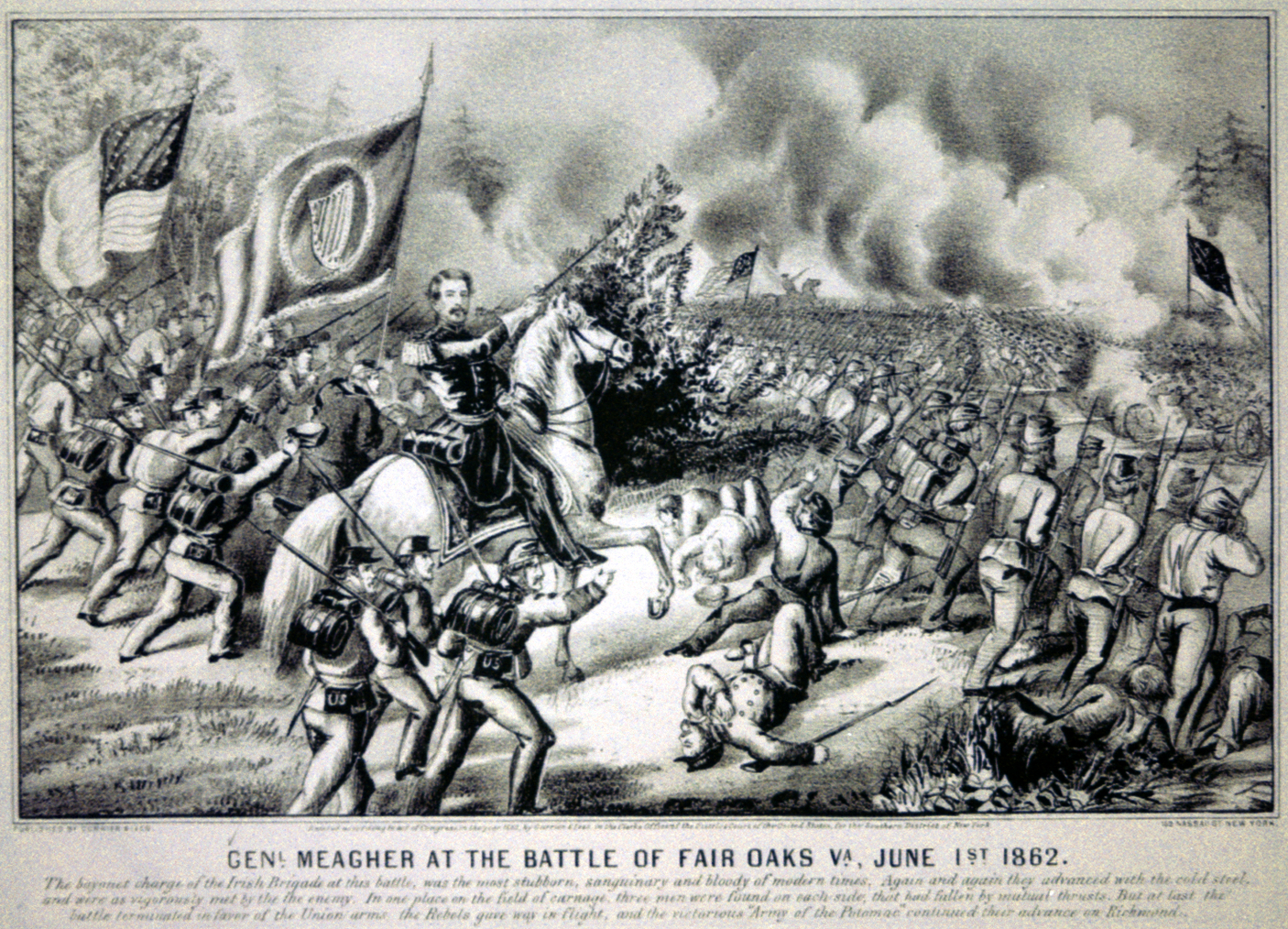
Brig. Gen. Thomas Francis Meagher at the Battle of Fair Oaks, June 1, 1862

Johnston knew that he could not survive a massive siege of Richmond and decided to attack McClellan. His original plan was to attack the Union right flank, north of the Chickahominy River, before McDowell's corps, marching south from Fredericksburg, could arrive. However, on May 27, Johnston learned that McDowell's corps had been diverted to the Shenandoah Valley and would not be reinforcing the Army of the Potomac. He decided against attacking across his own natural defense line, the Chickahominy, and planned to capitalize on the Union army's straddle of the river by attacking the two corps south of the river, leaving them isolated from the other three corps north of the river.

If executed correctly, Johnston would engage two thirds of his army (22 of its 29 infantry brigades, about 51,000 men) against the 33,000 men in the III and IV Corps. The Confederate attack plan was complex, calling for the divisions of A.P. Hill and Magruder to engage lightly and distract the Union forces north of the river, while Longstreet, commanding the main attack south of the river, was to converge on Keyes from three directions. The plan had an excellent potential for initial success because the division of the IV Corps farthest forward, manning the earthworks a mile west of Seven Pines, was that of Brig. Gen. Silas Casey, 6,000 men who were the least experienced in Keyes's corps. If Keyes could be defeated, the III Corps, to the east, could then be pinned against the Chickahominy and overwhelmed.

The complex plan was mismanaged from the start. Johnston issued orders that were vague and contradictory and failed to inform all of his subordinates about the chain of command. On Longstreet's part, he either misunderstood his orders or chose to modify them without informing Johnston, changing his route of march to collide with Hill's, which not only delayed the advance, but limited the attack to a narrow front with only a fraction of its total force. Exacerbating the problems on both sides was a severe thunderstorm on the night of May 30, which flooded the river, destroyed most of the Union bridges, and turned the roads into morasses of mud.

The attack got off to a bad start on May 31 when Longstreet marched down the Charles City Road and turned onto the Williamsburg Road instead of the Nine Mile Road. Huger's orders had not specified a time that the attack was scheduled to start and he was not awakened until he heard a division marching nearby. Johnston and his second-in-command, Smith, unaware of Longstreet's location or Huger's delay, waited at their headquarters for word of the start of the battle. Five hours after the scheduled start, at 1 p.m., D.H. Hill became impatient and sent his brigades forward against Casey's division.

Casey's line buckled with some men retreating, but fought fiercely for possession of their earthworks, resulting in heavy casualties on both sides. The Confederates only engaged four brigades of the thirteen on their right flank that day, so they did not hit with the power that they could have concentrated on this weak point in the Union line. Casey sent for reinforcements but Keyes was slow in responding. Eventually the mass of Confederates broke through, seized a Union redoubt, and Casey's men retreated to the second line of defensive works at Seven Pines.

Hill, now strengthened by reinforcements from Longstreet, hit the secondary Union line near Seven Pines around 4:40 p.m. Hill organized a flanking maneuver to attack Keyes's right flank, which collapsed the Federal line back to the Williamsburg Road. Johnston went forward on the Nine Mile Road with three brigades of Whiting's division and encountered stiff resistance near Fair Oaks Station, the right flank of Keyes's line. Soon heavy Union reinforcements arrived. Brig. Gen. Edwin V. Sumner, II Corps commander, heard the sounds of battle from his position north of the river. On his own initiative, he dispatched a division under Brig. Gen. John Sedgwick over the sole remaining bridge. The treacherous "Grapevine Bridge" was near collapse on the swollen river, but the weight of the crossing troops helped to hold it steady against the rushing water. After the last man had crossed safely, the bridge collapsed and was swept away. Sedgwick's men provided the key to resisting Whiting's attack.

At dusk, Johnston was wounded and evacuated to Richmond. G.W. Smith assumed temporary command of the army. Smith, plagued with ill health, was indecisive about the next steps for the battle and made a bad impression on President Davis and General Lee, Davis's military adviser. After the end of fighting the following day, Davis replaced Smith with Lee as commander of the Army of Northern Virginia.

On June 1, the Confederates under Smith renewed their assaults against the Federals, who had brought up more reinforcements and fought from strong positions, but made little headway. The fighting ended about 11:30 a.m. when the Confederates withdrew. McClellan arrived on the battlefield from his sick bed at about this time, but the Union Army did not counterattack.

Both sides claimed victory with roughly equal casualties—Union casualties were 5,031 (790 killed, 3,594 wounded, 647 captured or missing), Confederate 6,134 (980 killed, 4,749 wounded, 405 captured or missing). McClellan's advance on Richmond was halted and the Army of Northern Virginia fell back into the Richmond defensive works. The battle was frequently remembered by the Union soldiers as the Battle of Fair Oaks Station because that is where they did their best fighting, whereas the Confederates, for the same reason, called it Seven Pines.

== The Seven Days Battles ==
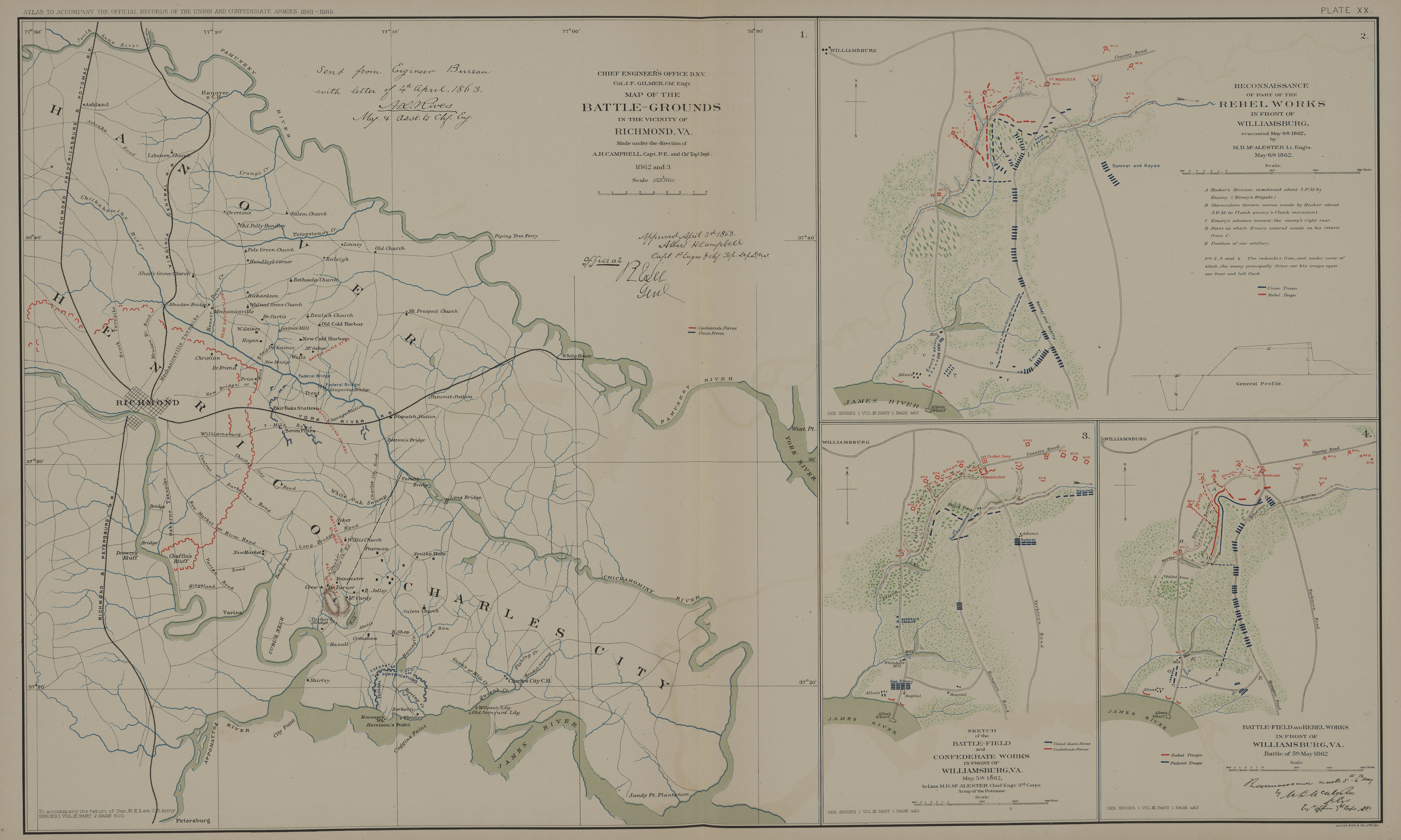
Seven Days Battles: map of events (left side)

Despite claiming victory at Seven Pines, McClellan was shaken by the experience. He redeployed all of his army except for the V Corps south of the river, and although he continued to plan for a siege and the capture of Richmond, he lost the strategic initiative and never regained it.

Lee used the month-long pause in McClellan's advance to fortify the defenses of Richmond and extend them south to the James River at Chaffin's Bluff. On the south side of the James River, defensive lines were built south to a point below Petersburg. The total length of the new defensive line was about 30 miles (48 km). To buy time to complete the new defensive line and prepare for an offensive, Lee repeated the tactic of making a small number of troops seem larger than they really were. McClellan was also unnerved by Jeb Stuart's audacious (but otherwise militarily pointless) cavalry ride completely around the Union army (June 13–15).

The second phase of the Peninsula campaign took a negative turn for the Union when Lee launched fierce counterattacks just east of Richmond in the Seven Days Battles (June 25 – July 1, 1862). Although none of these battles were significant Confederate tactical victories (and the Battle of Malvern Hill on the last day was a significant Confederate defeat), the tenacity of Lee's attacks and the sudden appearance of Stonewall Jackson's "foot cavalry" on his western flank unnerved McClellan, who pulled his forces back to a base on the James River. Lincoln later ordered the army to return to the Washington, D.C., area to support Maj. Gen. John Pope's army in the northern Virginia campaign and the Second Battle of Bull Run. The Virginia Peninsula was relatively quiet until May 1864, when Maj. Gen. Benjamin Butler again invaded as part of the Bermuda Hundred campaign.

== See also ==
- Armies in the American Civil War
- Bibliography of the American Civil War
- List of costliest American Civil War land battles
- Richmond National Battlefield Park
- Troop engagements of the American Civil War, 1862
- Union Army Balloon Corps
