= USRC Naugatuck =

Revenue cutter of the United States

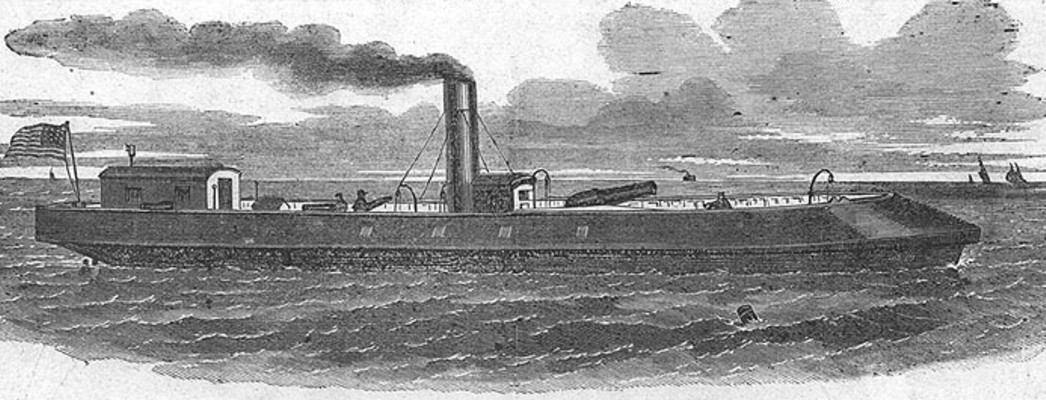
- USRC E. A. Stevens operating in the Hampton Roads area, Virginia.

History

→ United States
- Name: USRC Naugatuck
- Namesake: An Indian word meaning "one tree" or "fork of the river."
- Operator: U.S. Revenue-Marine
- Laid down: 1844
- Launched: at New York City in 1844
- In service: March 1862
- Out of service: 1889
- Renamed: USRC E. A. Stevens, 1862
- Stricken: 1890 (est.)
- Nickname(s): "Hoboken Ironclad"
- Fate: continued in use as the USRC Naugatuck until sold in 1890
- Status: afterwards known as the merchant vessel Argus

General characteristics
- Class & type: Armored gunboat
- Type: twin-screw semi-submersible
- Tonnage: 192 register tons (544 m³)
- Length: 110 ft (33.5 m)
- Beam: 20 ft (6.1 m)
- Draft: 7 ft 8 in (2.3 m) (ballast empty); 9 ft 10 in (3.0 m) (ballast full)
- Propulsion: Steam engine; twin screw-propelled
- Speed: 9 kn (17 km/h; 10 mph) (ballast empty); 4 kn (7.4 km/h; 4.6 mph) (ballast full)
- Complement: 24 officers and men
- Armament: 1 × 100-pounder Parrott rifle; 2 × 12-pounder howitzers
- Armor: iron-plate belt at gunwale

USRC Naugatuck was a twin-screw ironclad experimental steamer operated by the United States Revenue-Marine during the American Civil War. She served the United States Department of the Treasury initially as USRC E. A. Stevens before being renamed Naugatuck, a name she retained until sold in 1890. The Treasury Department loaned her to the United States Navy and thus she was mistakenly referred to in U.S. Navy dispatches during early 1862 as "USS Naugatuck".

== An experimental ironclad design ==
In 1841, Robert L. Stevens and Edwin Augustus Stevens — the sons of Colonel John Stevens of Hoboken, New Jersey — proposed to the Navy Department the construction of an ironclad vessel of high speed, with screw propellers and all machinery below the waterline. This proposal was accepted and an Act of Congress — approved on 14 April 1842 — authorized the Secretary of the Navy to contract for the construction of a shot and shell-proof steamer, to be built principally of iron, on the Stevens plan. The armor was to be 4.5 in (11 cm) thick, a thickness believed by the Stevens brothers to be sufficient to resist any gun then known. But experiments made by John Ericsson with his big wrought-iron gun proved that 4.5 inches of armor was insufficient, and the construction of the vessel was thus delayed. In 1854, the builders constructed a larger battery, to be plated with 6.75 in (17.1 cm) of iron, but this in turn was never finished. This vessel was referred to as the "Stevens Battery".

== A working "proof of concept" vessel ==
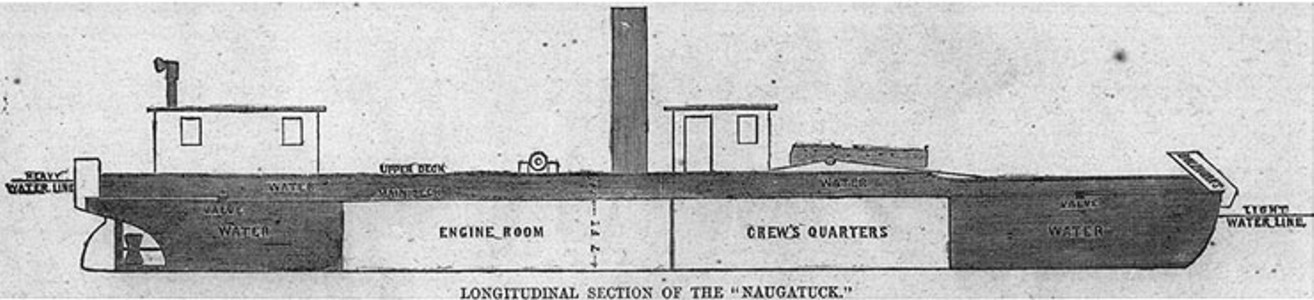
A general arrangement diagram of the gunboat's interior. Note the extensive provisions for ballasting the ship with water to reduce her freeboard in action.

To demonstrate the practicality of the plan of the Stevens Battery, the Stevens brothers bought, modified and fitted out at their own expense a small prototype. The iron steamer — originally named Naugatuck — was built in 1844 by H.R. Dunham & Company, a New York City locomotive builder, for the Ansonia Copper and Brass Company. During the 1850s, Naugatuck ran between New London and New York.

In 1861, Stevens bought Naugatuck as a test-bed for innovations intended for the Stevens Battery, still unfinished in the shipyard. During 1861 and early 1862, Stevens reinforced the deck to support one 100-pound Parrott gun amidships trained forward, later augmented with two 12-pounder howitzers. Stevens replaced the original engine with a twin propeller arrangement, driven by two inclined engines with one boiler. He also added interior ballast tanks fore and aft. The New York Times reported on March 22, 1862, that "The Naugatuck is not intended to be a model of Mr. Stevens' iron-clad battery, but is designed to illustrate one or two novel ideas connected with that monstrous engine of war, viz: The ability to sink and raise a vessel with great rapidity; to turn and manage her by means of two propellers located one on each side of the stern; also, taking up the recoil of the gun by means of India-rubber."

Stevens renamed the vessel after himself. Many contemporary newspapers and later historians mistakenly confused the E.A. Stevens with the Stevens Battery. Edwin Stevens designed the gunboat to operate in shallow waters. The iron hull's ballast tanks were placed at the fore and aft extremes of the hull, and utilized a patented gum rubber liner to ensure a watertight seal. These ballast tanks were used to make the vessel semi-submersible, allowing the hull to change its draft from 7 feet 8 inches (2.3 m) to 9 feet 10 inches (3.0 m). The 2-foot (0.6 m) reduced freeboard minimized the vessel's vulnerability to gunfire, keeping the steam machinery below the waterline. Stevens added heavy duty centrifugal pumps that could fill ballast in minutes or, if the boat grounded while ballasted down, pump out to refloat the vessel quickly. With the ballast tanks dry, the vessel's speed increased from 4 knots (7.4 km/h; 4.6 mph) to over 9 knots (17 km/h; 10 mph).

While her hull boasted all-iron construction, her only armor consisted of a low-lying angled armor band or skirt surrounding the main deck. This band covered a wooden bulwark built of solid cedar, which rose 18 in (46 cm) above the deck and measured 4.5 feet (1.4 m) in depth. The bulwark surrounded the deck, keeping water off it and providing slight cover from enemy fire while ballasted down.

At the onset of the Civil War, Stevens offered to donate his gunboat to the Navy, but officials refused the gift, explaining that the untried prototype was not suitable for Navy missions. Stevens then donated her to the U.S. Revenue Cutter Service, providing them with their first ironclad gunboat. E.A. Stevens was stationed as one of the cutters patrolling the Varrazano Narrows entrance to New York harbor.

== Operating with the North Atlantic Blockade ==
In March 1862, the Treasury Department ordered the gunboat to steam south from New York to Hampton Roads. It did so with a crew of boatswain, gunner, carpenter, steward, cook, two quartermasters, 14 seamen, and a "servant." The crew also included some of Stevens' associates, including William W. Shippen, from the Hoboken Land and Improvement Company. Shippen commanded the vessel, and Lieutenants J. Wall Wilson and E.L. Morton (USRCS) serving under him. Thomas Lingle, who installed the gunboat's machinery, served as chief engineer and remained in that position into 1863.

On April 9, E.A. Stevens reached Hampton Roads to join the North Atlantic Blockading Squadron's James River Squadron. On April 11, under command of Captain Shippen, Stevens exchanged fire with CSS Virginia when the ironclad emerged from its anchorage near Craney Island. Virginia's primary target, USS Monitor, declined action, so the hostilities proved inconclusive.

On April 29, Lieutenant David Constable, USRCS relieved Shippen and took command of the gunboat and its crew of two dozen. By May 10, Confederate land forces evacuated Norfolk, leaving the deep-draft Virginia with neither a defensible homeport nor a feasible escape route. On the evening of May 10, commanding officer Josiah Tattnall ran the ironclad aground near Craney Island and set it on fire. When the fire reached the ship's magazine, the Virginia was completely destroyed. With the destruction of the Virginia, the Confederate Navy retained only a few lightly armed gunboats to counter the superior forces of the Union Navy.

== Action at Drewery's Bluff (Fort Darling) ==
In an effort to renew his Peninsular Campaign, General George McClellan requested a squadron to force its way up the James River and threaten Richmond from the water. To fulfill this request, North Atlantic Blockading Squadron commander, Flag Officer Louis Goldsborough, assigned Commodore John Rodgers the command of the James River Squadron, which included the Navy's wooden steam gunboats USS Aroostook and USS Port Royal, the ironclads USS Monitor and USS Galena, and E.A. Stevens. The Federal warships experienced only minor resistance during their passage up the James River to reach the fortifications at Drewry's Bluff.

On May 15, the battle opened when Rodgers' flagship Galena approached to within 400 yd (370 m) of sunken obstructions in the river. The fort was armed with eight heavy naval guns, manned by local Confederate land forces and naval personnel (the former crew of the Virginia). Galena received over forty hits, of which eighteen penetrated its armor. Stevens also moved up to take its place in the battle. The gunboat's technological innovations worked effectively, and she sustained no heavy damage from plunging fire as it sat partly submerged and firing its main battery. Moreover, the gunboat's ordnance loading system successfully protected the crew from enemy sharpshooters and musket fire. Stevens' bombardment halted when the 100-pound Parrott rifle burst while firing. The explosion shattered the gun's breech, damaging the pilothouse and the ship's deck. Despite losing its main gun, the gunboat continued to fire its 12-pound howitzers with canister and shell.

By 11 a.m., Galena had suffered severe damage, exhausted her ammunition, and sustained thirteen dead and many wounded. Rodgers ordered the fleet to retire down river. Stevens had experienced few casualties despite musket fire, enemy shelling, and her catastrophic gun failure. One of the crew received a shot in the arm; another suffered a serious contusion. Lieutenant Constable sustained a head injury from shrapnel from the exploding Parrott gun, but remained at his station directing the broadside guns and commanding the ship throughout the remainder of the battle.

The James River Squadron retired to City Point, with Stevens arriving that evening and the rest of the squadron arriving in the morning of May 16. On the 16th, Rodgers convened a board, composed of squadron officers, to examine the remains of the Parrott rifle and determine the cause of its failure. The board concluded that rigorous testing and experimentation before installation on board Stevens had weakened the gun, which was the first of its kind produced by the manufacturer.

Meanwhile, the gunboat received the squadron's wounded and proceeded downriver shortly thereafter to Fort Monroe. E.A. Stevens had been operating in Virginia waters since early April 1862. Even though her main gun remained shattered, Commodore Rodgers still felt it could provide good service to the James River Squadron. Nevertheless, the vessel saw no serious action after Drewry's Bluff.

== Returned to the Treasury Department ==
Naugatuck was returned to the Treasury Department, and on May 26 the Secretary ordered the gunboat to depart Hampton Roads and steam north to the Washington Navy Yard for repairs. On May 29, while the gunboat underwent these repairs, President Lincoln honored Lieutenant Constable by promoting him to captain before an audience of his full cabinet. Soon afterward, the Treasury Department transferred Constable to a new assignment, but not one near the front lines of the war.

By mid-July 1862, the gunboat had made its way to New York City to become guard ship for the harbor. In July 1863, the gunboat defended the McDougal General Hospital at Fort Schuyler, playing a small role in the New York City Draft Riots. On July 29, Treasury Secretary Salmon P. Chase ordered the gunboat's name to revert from E.A. Stevens back to Naugatuck. Out of her 45 years of existence, the vessel held the name E.A. Stevens for little more than three years.

After the conclusion of hostilities, the Treasury Department assigned Naugatuck responsibility for patrolling North Carolina's inland sounds, homeported at New Bern. Naugatuck served in this duty from late 1865 until the summer of 1889, with periodic trips to New York, Norfolk, and Baltimore for maintenance and repairs. Throughout her career as a gunboat, E.A. Stevens/Naugatuck remained a steamer in the Revenue Cutter Service and at no time had belonged to the United States Navy. On 18 August 1889, she was reported at Baltimore, Maryland to be sold.
