= USS Port Royal (1862) =

Gunboat of the United States Navy

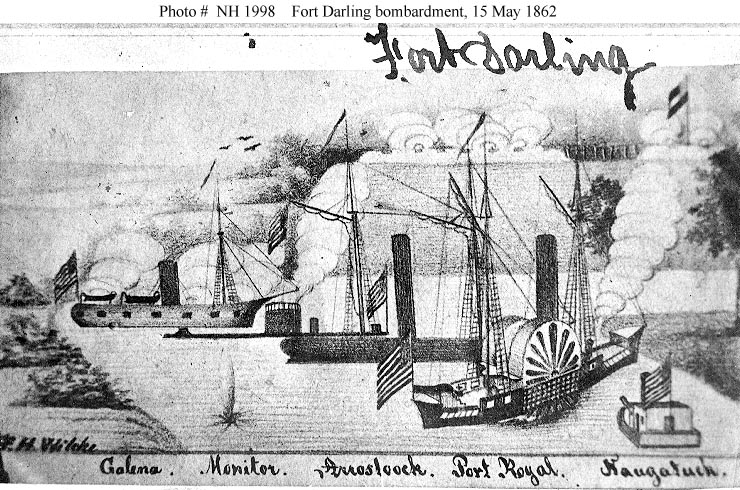

History

United States
- Name: USS Port Royal
- Namesake: One of the Sea Islands
- Launched: 17 January 1862
- Commissioned: 26 April 1862
- Decommissioned: 23 May 1866
- Fate: Sold, 3 October 1866

General characteristics
- Type: steamboat
- Displacement: 805 tons
- Length: 209 ft (64 m)
- Beam: 35 ft (11 m)
- Draft: 9 ft (2.7 m)
- Depth of hold: 11 ft 6 in (3.51 m)
- Propulsion: steam engine, side-wheel propelled
- Speed: 9 knots (17 km/h; 10 mph)

USS Port Royal was a double-ended gunboat built for the U.S. Navy during the American Civil War. The vessel was assigned to patrol the rivers and other waterways of the Confederate States of America and to enforce the Union blockade on the South.

== Service history ==
Port Royal, a wooden, double-ended, side-wheel gunboat, was launched at New York 17 January 1862 by Thomas Stack and commissioned at New York Navy Yard, 26 April 1862. Departing New York 4 May, Port Royal steamed to Hampton Roads, Virginia, to join the North Atlantic Blockading Squadron in supporting General George McClellan's drive up the peninsula toward Richmond, Virginia. She engaged Confederate batteries at Sewell's Point, Virginia, 8 May and a week later participated in the Battle of Drewry's Bluff, on the James River below the southern capital. After General Robert E. Lee's seven day campaign turned back McClellan's thrust, Port Royal shifted operations to the North Carolina Sounds. She was part of the Union Naval force which reconnoitered the Neuse River, North Carolina, arid attacked Kinston, 12–16 December.

The spring of 1863 found her operating along the Florida coast. On 20 April, a landing party from the ship raided Apalachicola, Florida, capturing cotton and ordnance. On 24 May a boat expedition captured sloop Fashion laden with cotton in the same area. The Union party also burned a ship repair facility at Devil's Elbow and destroyed a barge. In ensuing months Port Royal continued to patrol the Confederate coast. In August 1864, she served with Rear Admiral David Farragut during the operations in Mobile Bay, Alabama. Port Royal then continued patrol duty through the end of the Civil War. Decommissioned 23 May 1866, she was sold at Boston, Massachusetts, 3 October 1866. Her ultimate fate is unknown.
