= National Register of Historic Places listings in Isle of Wight County, Virginia =

Location of Isle of Wight County in Virginia

This is a list of the National Register of Historic Places listings in Isle of Wight County, Virginia.

This is intended to be a complete list of the properties and districts on the National Register of Historic Places in Isle of Wight County, Virginia, United States. The locations of National Register properties and districts for which the latitude and longitude coordinates are included below, may be seen in a Google map.

There are 21 properties and districts listed on the National Register in the county, including 1 National Historic Landmark. Another property was once listed, but has since been removed.

This National Park Service list is complete through NPS recent listings posted March 6, 2026.

== Current listings ==
| | Name on the Register | Image | Date listed | Location | City or town | Description |
|---|---|---|---|---|---|---|
| 1 | Basses Choice-Days Point Archeological District | Basses Choice-Days Point Archeological District | July 28, 1983 (#83003285) | Address Restricted | Rushmere | |
| 2 | Boykin's Tavern | Boykin's Tavern | June 19, 1974 (#74002131) | West of U.S. Route 258; 36°54′30″N 76°42′33″W | Isle of Wight | |
| 3 | Fort Boykin Archaeological Site (44IW20) | Fort Boykin Archaeological Site (44IW20) | August 1, 1985 (#85001675) | Fort Boykin Trail; 37°02′06″N 76°37′08″W | Smithfield | Now a county park. |
| 4 | Fort Huger | Fort Huger | April 16, 2008 (#08000320) | Talcott Terrace; 37°06′36″N 76°39′32″W | Smithfield | |
| 5 | Four Square | Four Square | July 26, 1979 (#79003047) | West of Smithfield on Foursquare Rd. 36°57′55″N 76°41′27″W | Smithfield | |
| 6 | P. D. Gwaltney Jr. House | P. D. Gwaltney Jr. House | January 27, 1999 (#99000075) | 304 Church St. 36°58′54″N 76°37′42″W | Smithfield | |
| 7 | Isle of Wight County Courthouse Complex | Isle of Wight County Courthouse Complex | August 7, 2019 (#100004263) | 17140 Monument Circle; 36°54′32″N 76°42′32″W | Isle of Wight | |
| 8 | Ivy Hill Cemetery | Ivy Hill Cemetery | April 4, 2007 (#07000275) | West of N. Church St. 36°59′26″N 76°37′57″W | Smithfield | |
| 9 | Joseph Jordan House | Joseph Jordan House | June 22, 1979 (#79003046) | Northeast of Raynor on Dews Plantation Rd. 36°58′22″N 76°46′10″W | Raynor | |
| 10 | Nike-Ajax Missile Launch Site N-75L | Nike-Ajax Missile Launch Site N-75L | August 7, 2019 (#100004266) | 13036 Nike Park Rd. 36°57′42″N 76°33′48″W | Carrollton | |
| 11 | Oak Crest | Oak Crest | January 21, 1999 (#98001648) | 34457 Lee's Mill Rd. 36°40′16″N 76°53′05″W | Franklin | |
| 12 | Old Isle of Wight Courthouse | Old Isle of Wight Courthouse | September 15, 1970 (#70000802) | Northeastern corner of Main and Mason Sts. 36°58′55″N 76°37′55″W | Smithfield | |
| 13 | Col. Josiah Parker Family Cemetery | Col. Josiah Parker Family Cemetery | April 27, 2004 (#04000381) | Approximately 50 yards from the junction of Old Macklesfield Rd. and Macklesfield Ct. 36°58′34″N 76°32′09″W | Smithfield | |
| 14 | Poplar Hill | Poplar Hill | August 18, 1995 (#95000975) | 7968 Purvis Ln., 0.9 miles northwest of its junction with Wrenns Mill Rd. 37°02′06″N 76°40′48″W | Smithfield | |
| 15 | William Rand Tavern | William Rand Tavern | May 27, 2004 (#04000548) | 112 W. Main St. 36°58′56″N 76°37′55″W | Smithfield | |
| 16 | Henry Saunders House | Henry Saunders House | May 19, 2004 (#04000479) | 13009 E. Windsor Boulevard; 36°48′02″N 76°42′21″W | Windsor | |
| 17 | William Scott Farmstead | William Scott Farmstead | January 25, 1991 (#90002194) | Shiloh Dr., east of its junction with Lovers Ln. 36°48′50″N 76°42′28″W | Windsor | |
| 18 | Smithfield Historic District | Smithfield Historic District | July 2, 1973 (#73002022) | Roughly bounded by the Pagan River, Little Creek, and the town line 36°58′53″N 76°37′58″W | Smithfield | |
| 19 | St. Luke's Church | St. Luke's Church | October 15, 1966 (#66000838) | 4 miles south of Smithfield on U.S. Route 258; 36°56′26″N 76°35′08″W | Smithfield | Built in 1682; one of the oldest surviving brick churches in the Thirteen Colonies and among the oldest existing English churches in America. |
| 20 | Robert Tynes House | Robert Tynes House | March 21, 2007 (#07000194) | 13060 U.S. Route 258; 36°57′47″N 76°39′47″W | Smithfield | |
| 21 | Windsor Castle Farm | Windsor Castle Farm | August 2, 2000 (#00000897) | 301 Jericho Rd. 36°58′44″N 76°37′28″W | Smithfield | |

== Former listing ==
| | Name on the Register | Image | Date listed | Date removed | Location | City or town | Description |
|---|---|---|---|---|---|---|---|
| 1 | Wolftrap Farm | Wolftrap Farm | October 15, 1974 (#74002132) | September 18, 2017 | Northwest of Smithfield off Emmanuel Church Rd. 36°59′52″N 76°41′50″W | Smithfield | Dismantled. |

== See also ==
- List of National Historic Landmarks in Virginia
- National Register of Historic Places listings in Virginia
- National Register of Historic Places listings in Franklin, Virginia
