= Basses Choice-Days Point Archeological District =

Archaeological site in Virginia, United States

- Basses Choice/Days Point Archeological District
- U.S. National Register of Historic Places
- U.S. Historic district
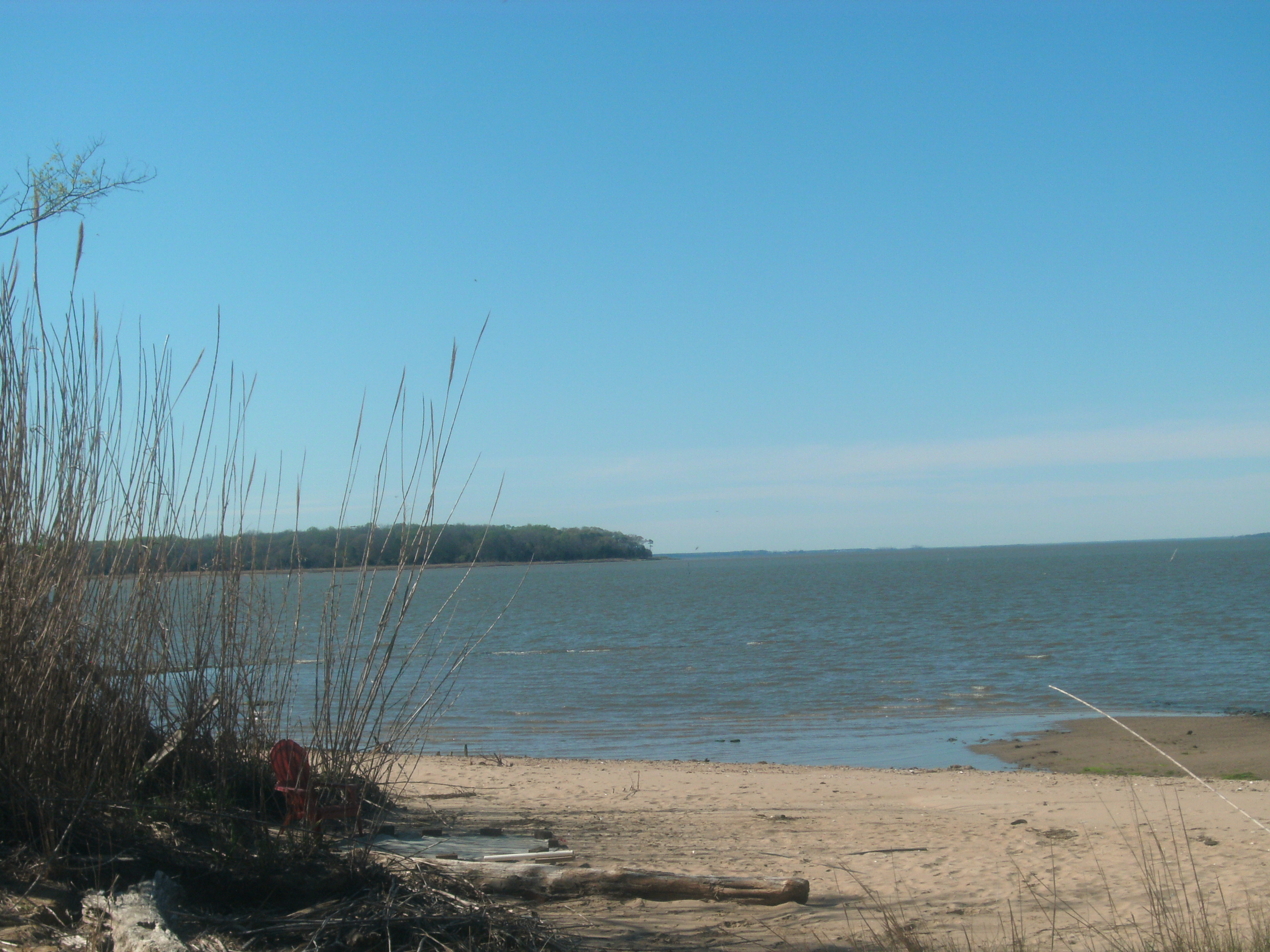
- View across the Pagan River from Rescue, April 2017
- Location: Rushmere, Virginia
- Area: 426 acres (172 ha)
- NRHP reference No.: 83003285
- Added to NRHP: July 28, 1983

The Basses Choice/Days Point Archeological District is a large area (more than 400 acres (160 ha)) of coastal Isle of Wight County, Virginia, that is of archaeological interest. It is located in the area between the Pagan River and the James River, north of Smithfield. The point of land at the confluence of the two rivers has been known as Day's Point since Virginia was settled by English colonists in the 17th century. Land on the point was granted to Captain John Day, and the area was known as Warrosquyoake Shire before it was renamed Isle of Wight County. In 1621 Nathaniel Basse was granted land that bordered Pagan Bay. Basse settled colonists on this land in 1622. His house was burned in the Great Massacre of 1622, when a significant number of settlers in Warrosquyoake were killed by Native Americans. Basse's settlement was rebuilt, and he was reported as owning 300 acres (120 ha) in 1625.

The district was listed on the National Register of Historic Places in 1983.

== See also ==
- National Register of Historic Places listings in Isle of Wight County, Virginia

== Sources ==
- McCartney, Martha (2007). Virginia Immigrants and Adventurers, 1607-1635: A Biographical Dictionary. Genealogical Publishing Company. ISBN 9780806317748.
- Tyler, Lyon Gardiner (1900). The Cradle of the Republic: Jamestown and James River. Whittet and Shepperson. OCLC 123194400.
