= Four square (disambiguation) =

Four square is a ball game.

Four square may also refer to:

== Internet and entertainment ==
- Foursquare City Guide, a local search and discovery app
- 4 Square (game show), a British game show
- 4 Square (TV series), a Canadian children's show
- 4 Square (pinball), a pinball machine
- Handball (school), an Australian ball game

== Organizations ==
- Foursquare (company), a technology company and the developer of Foursquare City Guide
- Foursquare Rum Distillery, a Barbadian rum producer
- Four Square (supermarket), a New Zealand supermarket chain
- Four Square Laundry, a front company for a British Army intelligence unit in 1970s Belfast
- Foursquare Church

== Other uses ==
- Four Square (Smithfield, Virginia), U.S., a historic home and farm
- Four square writing method
- American Foursquare, an architectural style
- Four Square (cigarette)

== See also ==
- Russian four square
- Four-square cipher
- Lagrange's four-square theorem, stating that any natural number equals the sum of four integers squared
- Jacobi's four-square theorem giving the number of distinct ways an integer can be represented as the sum of four squares
- Euler's four-square identity or theorem, the product of two numbers, each of which is a sum of four squares, is itself a sum of four squares.
- Ariel Square Four, a motorcycle
