= Wolf Trap =

Wolf Trap or wolf trap may refer to:

- Wolf trap, a trap used for hunting wolves in medieval Europe
- Wolf Trap (film), a 1957 Czech film
- Wolf Trap, Virginia, census-designated place in Fairfax County, Virginia, U.S.
- Wolf Trap Opera Company, an opera residency program
- Wolf Trap National Park for the Performing Arts, performing arts center near Vienna, Virginia, U.S.
- "Wolf Trap", a miniature laboratory developed by Wolf V. Vishniac to search for life on Mars
- Wolftrap angler (Thaumatichthyidae), a family of anglerfish
- Wolftrap Farm, a former historic home in Isle of Wight County, Virginia, U.S.
- Wolftrap Mountain, a mountain in Offaly, Ireland

== See also ==
- Wolfsangel, a German heraldic charge inspired by historic wolf traps
