= King of All Places (Smithfield, Virginia) =

Coordinates: 36°58′22.33″N 76°36′53.46″W

King of All Places is a former plantation on the eastern side of Cypress Creek in Smithfield, Virginia. The plantation manor house dates from 1806. The plantation was founded by the Grimes family. The plantation was subdivided during the 1950s to form the Grimesland subdivision. The manor house remains a private residence. The manor house can be seen from the marsh overlook at Windsor Castle Park.

The origin of the name is recorded in the notes of the will of Captain John Moon: "Cypress creek flows into Pagan creek at Smithfield. The King of All Places is the first landing on Cypress creek and is so called from its very high bluffs, and the channel of the creek which runs right up to the bluff, and its depth of water. From the mouth of Pagan creek there are extensive flats extending thirty, forty, fifty feet and more from the shore, preventing the easy loading of a vessel, but at the King of All Places the vessel can be right up at the shore and be loaded without the least trouble; hence it was the King of All Places for shipping purposes. This is perfectly apparent "to the oldest inhabitant" now, but "the oldest inhabitant" never dreampt that these names were so ancient."

== Gallery ==
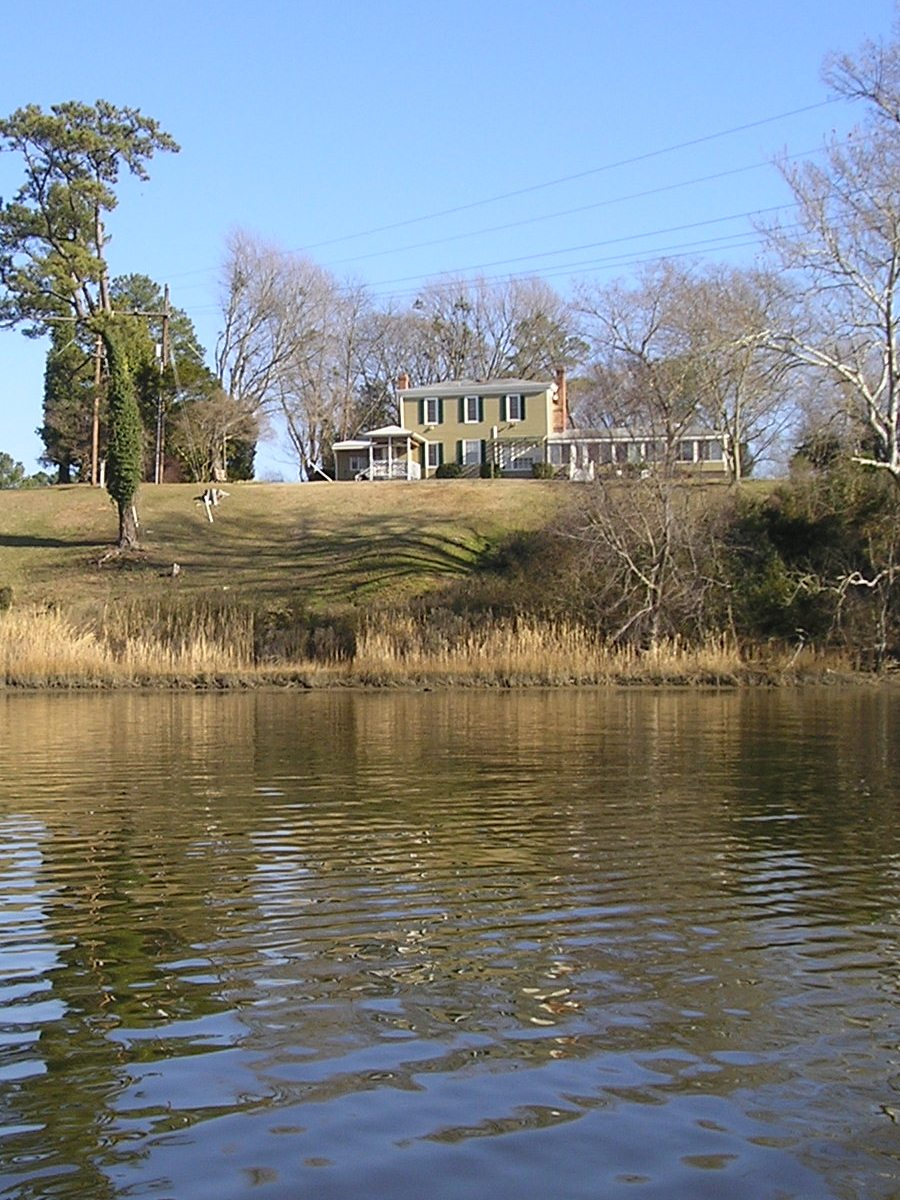
King of All Places manor house as seen from Cypress Creek

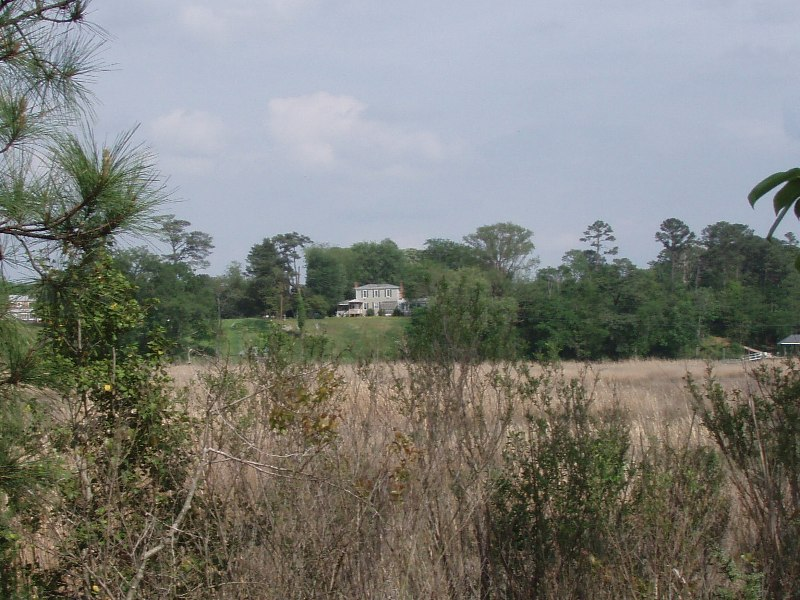
King of All Places manor house as seen from the Windsor Castle Park marsh overlook
