= Arthur Smith (captain) =

Founder of Smithfield, Virginia (1680–1755)

- Born: c. 1680; Isle of Wight, Virginia Colony; British America
- Died: 1755 (aged 75); Bacon's Castle; Surry County, Virginia
- Known for: Founder of Smithfield, Virginia
- Spouse: Elizabeth Bray-Allen
- Parent(s): Arthur Smith III, Mary Bromfield

Arthur Smith IV (c. 1680 – 1755) was a British colonial landowner, politician, and captain who incorporated Smithfield, Virginia, served as one of the town's founding trustees, and briefly represented Isle of Wight County in the Virginia House of Burgesses.

== Birth and family ==
Arthur Smith was born around 1680 in Isle of Wight County, Virginia, the eldest son of Colonel Arthur Smith III and Mary Bromfield Smith. Smith came from two prominent Isle of Wight families. Smith's father was appointed High Sheriff of Isle of Wight County by Acting Governor of Virginia, Francis Nicholson. Smith's maternal grandfather was John Bromfield (1630–1680), the Isle of Wight Clerk of Court. Smith's paternal grandfather was Arthur Smith II, a judge and member of the House of Burgesses. His great-grandfather was Arthur Smith I, also a member of the House of Burgesses who was granted a land grant from King Charles I of England in 1637.

By the 1730s, Smith married widow Elizabeth Bray-Allen, but they did not have any children.

== Life and career ==
Smith served as a member of the House of Burgesses representing Isle of Wight County from 1720 to 1722, succeeding his father in the seat he had previously held.

Smith inherited a 1,450 acre farm and plantation after the death of his father. In the 1740s, Smith built the current Windsor Castle estate on his family land. Smith owned at least four enslaved persons during his adulthood.

In 1750, Captain Smith petitioned the Virginia General Assembly to dock part of his entailed estate to create a town which he would call "Smithfield." The original survey and plat of the Town of Smithfield was made by Jordan Thomas, County Surveyor. The town of Smithfield was established as a colonial seaport in 1752 by Smith, which had four streets and 72 lots to house British merchants and ship captains. Each lot sold for four pounds, six shillings.

When establishing the town, Smith also donated a plot of land to become a free public school for children. The settlers brought hogs with them and quickly found that the climate of the town was ideal for curing ham and bacon.

Upon the establishment of the town of Smithfield by the General Assembly, Smith was appointed as one of the first voting trustees of the town, serving alongside Robert Burwell, William Holden, James Baker, James Dunlop, James Arthur, and Joseph Bridger.

== Death and burial ==
Smith died in 1755 at Bacon's Castle in Surry County, Virginia around 75 years old, just three years after the founding of Smithfield.

Smith is believed to be buried at the Windsor Castle family burying ground. In recent years, the town of Smithfield has discussed performing DNA testing and forensic analysis at the Smith burying ground to identify the grave of Captain Smith.

== See also ==
- Smithfield, Virginia
- Windsor Castle (Smithfield, Virginia)
