= Wentworth–Grinnan House =

Historic house in Virginia, United States

- U.S. Historic district – Contributing property
- Virginia Landmarks Register
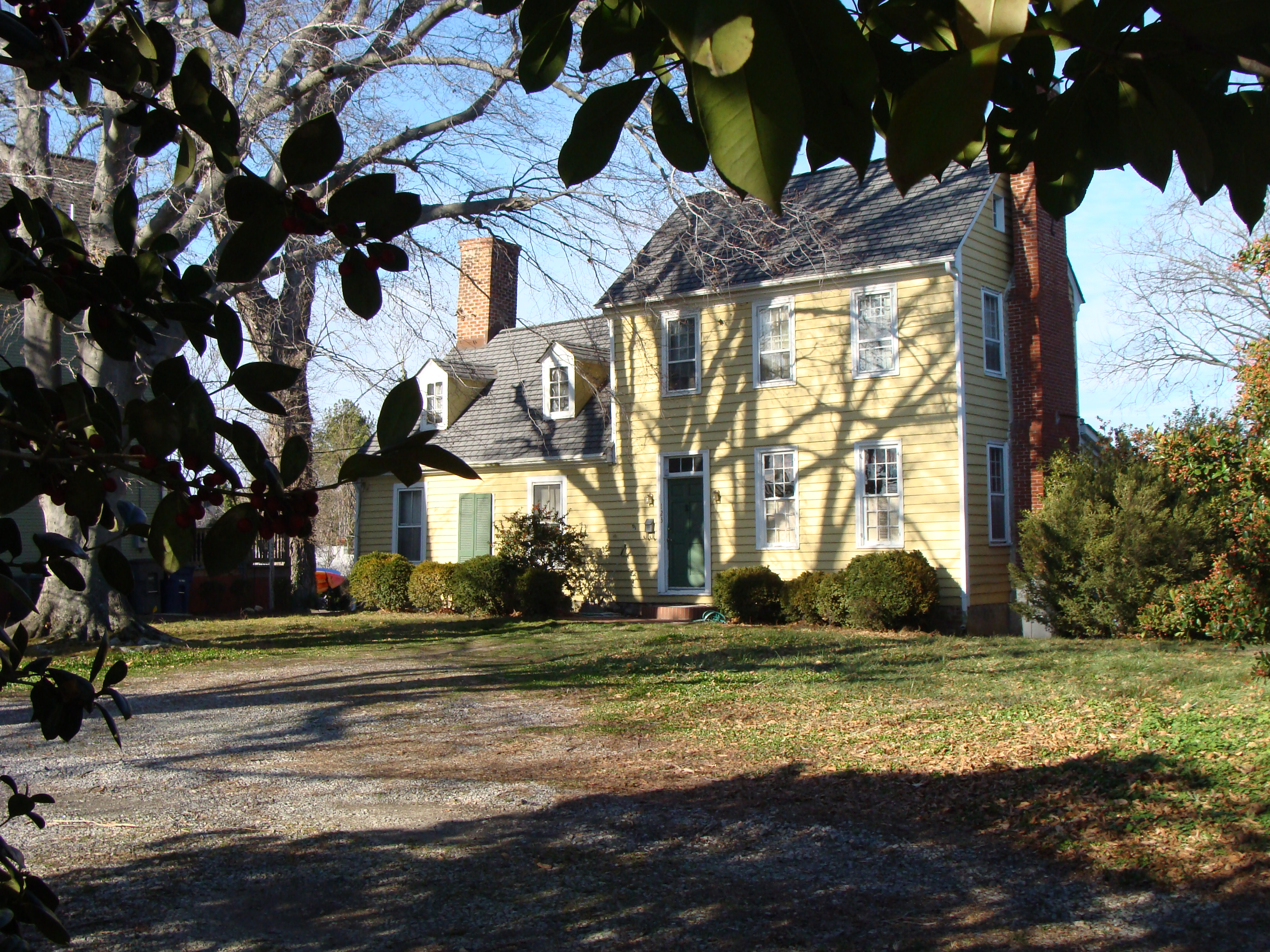

- Location within Virginia
- Location: 123 South Church Street, Smithfield, Virginia
- Coordinates: 36°58′56.12″N 76°37′46.86″W
- Built: ca.1780; 1820-22
- Part of: Smithfield Historic District (ID73002022)
- Designated CP: July 2, 1973

The Wentworth–Grinnan House (ca. 1780) is listed on the National Register of Historic Places and located on the river side of South Church Street within the Smithfield Historic District in Smithfield, Virginia. Smithfield is a colonial seaport town on the Pagan River in Isle of Wight County with colonial trading ties to Bermuda and the West Indies.

== History ==
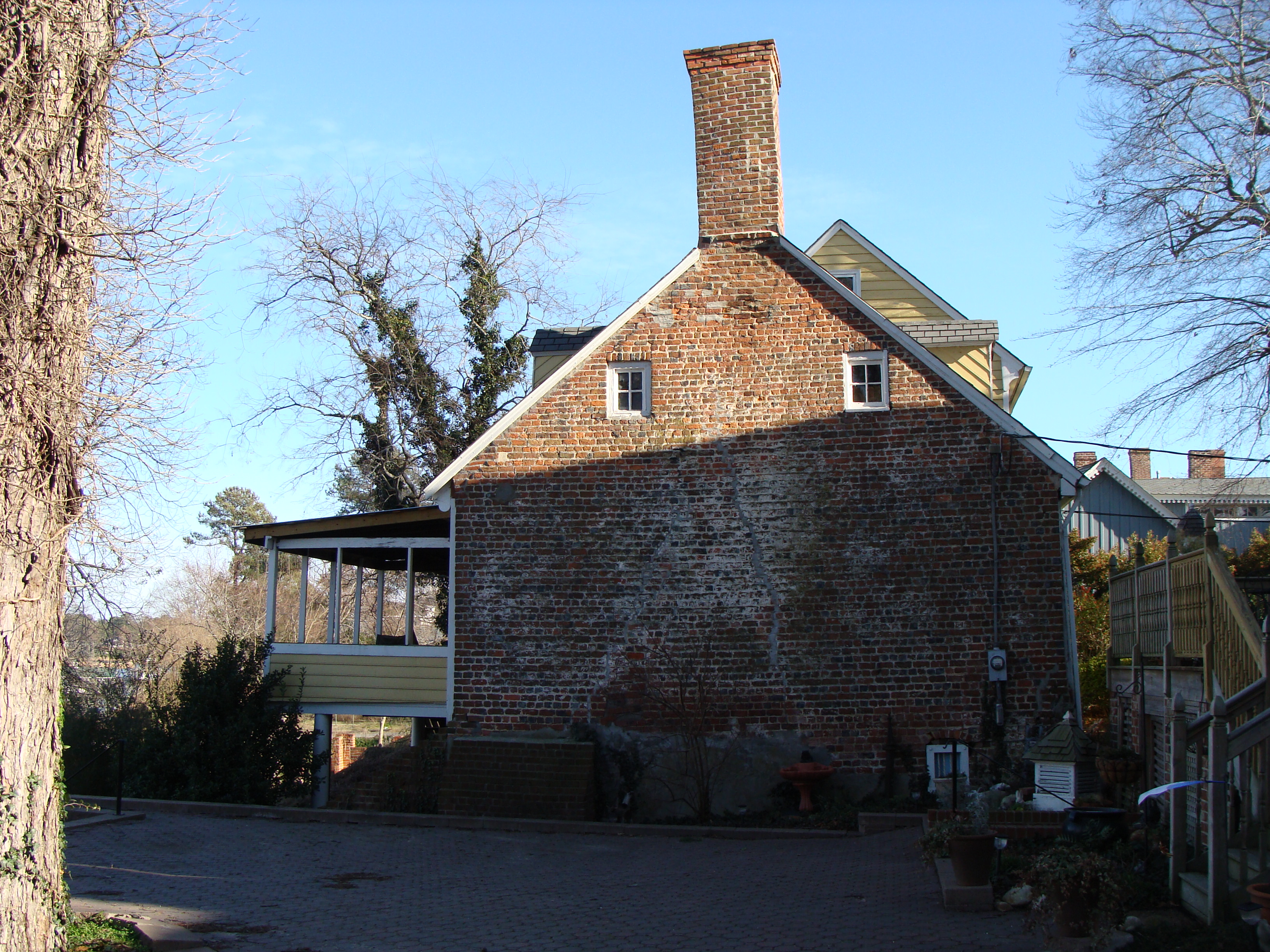
Flemish bond brickwork, c.1752

The Wentworth–Grinnan House was built as a 1 1/2-story house before 1760 and was expanded with addition of a larger wing, two-and-a-half stories tall, between 1820 and 1822. The original section "has a gabled roof with dormers, clapboarding, and a brick end wall with a brick chimney stack"; the addition has "clapboarding, and a brick chimney, six-over-six sash windows, and a first-floor porch across the facade." It is an example of Georgian architecture.

The property was first sold in 1752 to Captain Samuel Browne for four pounds, six shillings. Browne was one of Smithfield's earliest settlers and was a sea-going man in the shipping and trading business. When he died in 1760, he was half-owner of the sloop London and his other property contained in his warehouse (located in the old dormer end of the property) included 10 barrels of coffee, 6 hogsheads and one tierce of molasses (700 gallons), 2 hogsheads of sugar, 2 1/2 tierces of rum (150 gallons), 300 bushels of salt, 50 bushels of wheat, 50 hams and bacon, and 18 pounds of allspice.

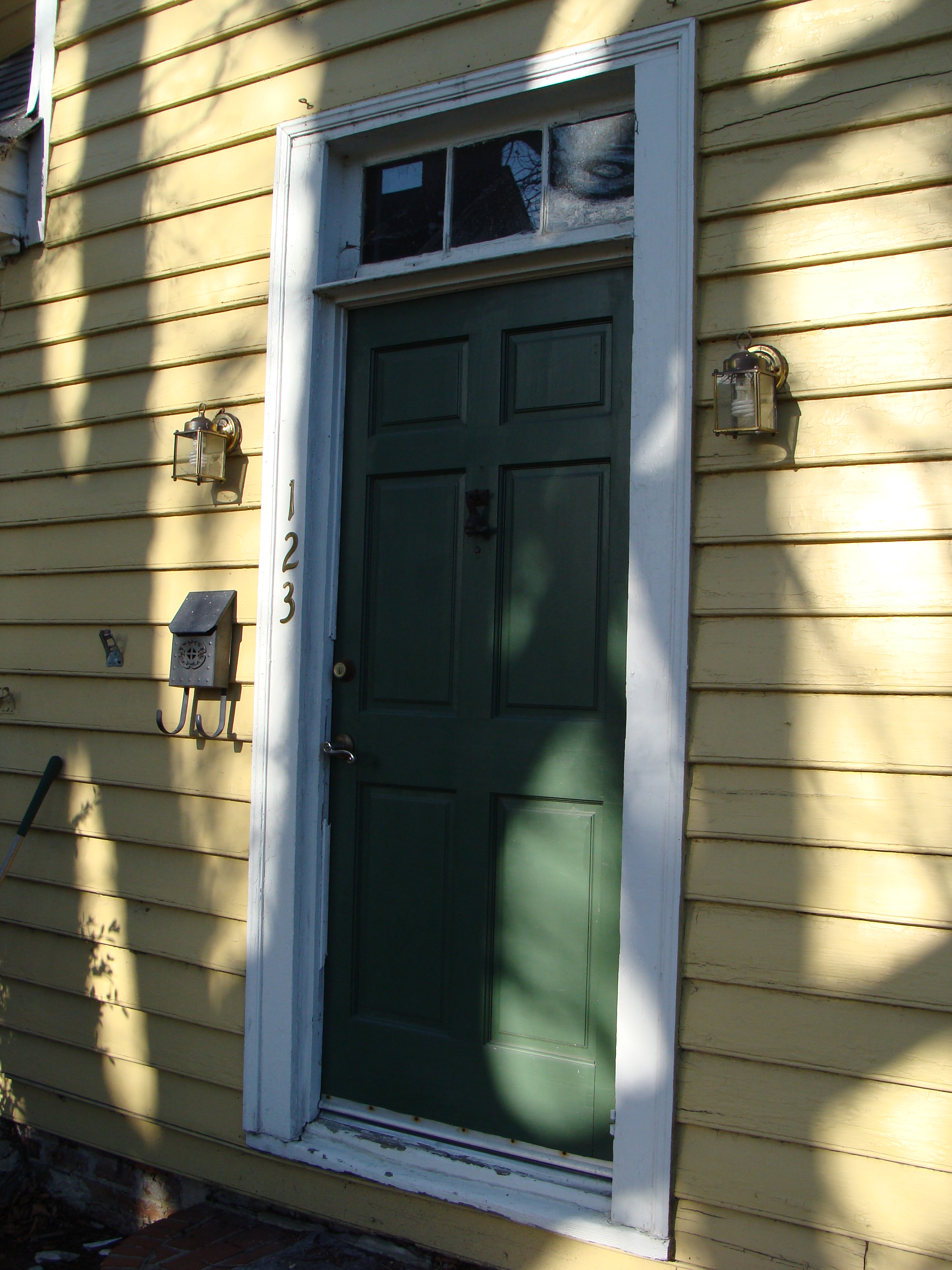
Front door, in 2012

Upon Browne's death the property passed to Captain Samuel Wentworth who lived on the adjacent lot and was subsequently owned by Wentworth descendants until 1809. The property later passed to a series of prominent Smithfield families and was home to the Grinnan family for 72 years.

It was listed on the National Register as a contributing building in the Smithfield Historic District in 1973.
