= Mary Batten =

American writer

- Born: 1937 (age 88–89); Smithfield, Virginia, United States
- Occupation: Science writer
- Writing career
- Genre: Non-fiction
- Subjects: Environment, science
- Website: www.marybatten.com

Mary Batten (born 1937) is an American writer of science books for children and adults. She is also known for writing television productions, films, and magazines, and has won several awards concerning her work in these areas.

== Biography ==
Born in 1937 in Smithfield, Virginia, Batten grew up in a farm, where, as a child, she learned about nature by playing in the woods and near the forest streams. Batten started writing when she was around the age of 7 or 8. In an interview, she revealed that she had wanted to become a writer since she was a child.

Batten went to University of North Carolina from 1955 to 1957. The following two years, she worked as a library clerk at New York Public Library before earning a B.A at New School for Social Research in 1959 and an M.A at Columbia University in 1962.

Batten lives with her husband, Ed Bland, who works as a composer. They have two grown children, Robert Bland, a writer, and Stefanie Batten Bland, a dancer.

== Career ==
Batten's writings focus mostly on environmental and natural issues, including ecology, animals, plants, etc. In order to write, she has visited many tropical rainforests, astronomical observatories, scientific laboratories, and medical research centers. Batten has confirmed that she only writes non-fiction books, and that she feels "lucky to be a science writer" because [she] can follow [her] curiosity". Although Batten does not write fiction books, her writings are influenced by fiction author Flannery O'Connor, as well as non-fiction authors Stephen Jay Gould and Edward O. Wilson. As of 2011, she has written 16 books for adults and children.

In 1992, Batten published "Sexual Strategies: How Females Choose Their Mates," which became one of her most successful books. This book, about the powerful role female mate choice plays in evolution, was released in an updated edition in 2008. "Sexual Strategies is a gem; a beautifully researched and concise introduction to animal mating systems and the clearest available account on the biology of female choice," said Sarah Blaffer Hrdy, Ph.D., Emeritus Professor of Anthropology, University of California, Davis.

In 2001, Batten published Anthropologist: Scientist of the People, which won the 2002 "Outstanding Science Trade Book for Children citation" given by National Science Teachers Association. Several other books of hers are also recommended by National Science Teachers Association: Who Has A Belly Button, Aliens from Earth , Hey, Daddy! Animal Fathers and Their Babies, The Winking, Blinking Sea: All about Bioluminescence. Among them, Hey, Daddy! Animal Fathers and Their Babies, published in 2002, was named "Outstanding Science Read Aloud 2003" by American Association for the Advancement of Science. "Aliens from Earth" won the 2006 Izaak Walton League of America Conservation Book of the Year Award and was adopted by the New York City Public Schools in support of the 4th grade science requirement for the study of ecosystems.

Batten has written many nature documentaries for television, including the Wild, Wild World of Animals series. She also writes for National Geographic and Walt Disney Educational Films. Batten received a nomination for an Emmy Award for her work on a Children's Television Workshop science series, 3-2-1 Contact.

Batten was editor of The Cousteau Society's award-winning magazine, "Calypso Log," from 1987 to 1993. Until 2006, she was editor-in-chief of Breastlink.org, a website dedicated to victims of breast cancer and their families.

== Bibliography ==
- Discovery by Chance: Science and the Unexpected 1968.
- The Tropical Forest: Ants, Ants, Animals and Plants 1973.
- Nature's Tricksters: Animals and Plants That Aren't What They Seem 1992.
- The Twenty-five Scariest Hauntings in the World 1996.
- Shark Attack Almanac, illustrated by Carol Lyon 1997.
- Baby Wolf 1998.
- Sexual Strategies: How Females Choose Their Mates 1992; 2008.
- The Winking, Blinking Sea: All about Bioluminescence 2000.
- Hungry Plants 2000.
- Extinct!: Creatures of the Past 2000.
- Anthropologist: Scientist of the People 2001.
- Wild Cats 2002.
- Hey, Daddy!: Animal Fathers and Their Babies 2002.
- Aliens from Earth: When Animals and Plants Invade Other Ecosystems 2003.
- Who Has a Belly Button? 2004.
- Please don't wake the animals 2008.
