= Isle of Wight County Museum =

History museum in Smithfield, Virginia, US

Coordinates: 36.98211°N 76.63113°W

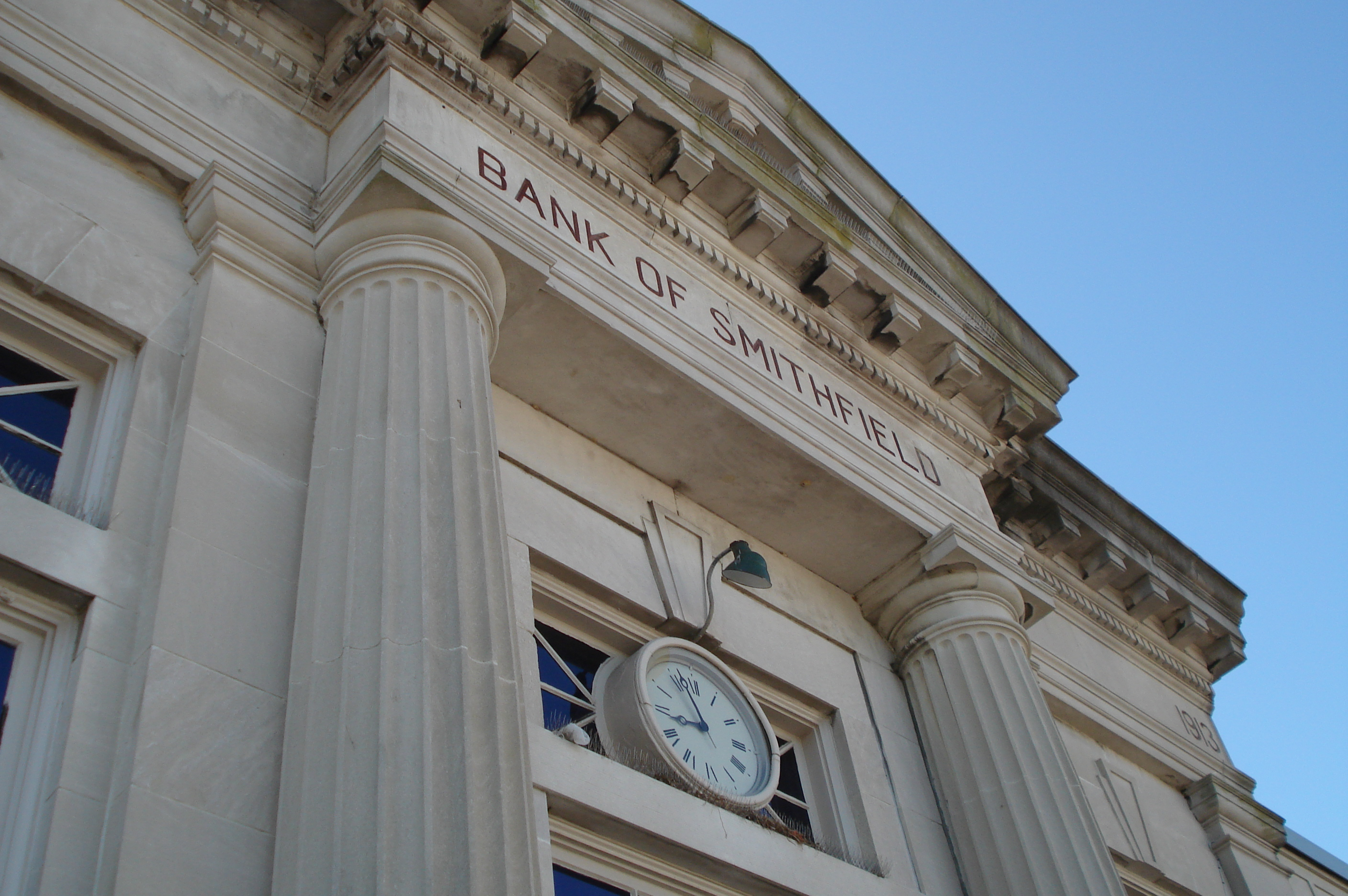
Isle of Wight County Museum, located in the Bank of Smithfield building

The Isle of Wight County Museum is located in Smithfield, Virginia.

== History ==
The Isle of Wight County Museum was founded in 1976.

Nearly two years before the 1976 United States Bicentennial commemoration, a number of heritage-minded Isle of Wight County citizens believed that the county needed a place where its history could be preserved. As a result of their efforts, the Isle of Wight County Board of Supervisors appointed a multi-talented group of county residents to a commission whose task was to collect, catalog and display artifacts for a new museum.

Smithfield's historic 18th-century Gaming House, located at 124 Main Street, was the first home for the collection. The museum opened on November 21, 1976, and for the first three years, dedicated volunteers kept the museum open on Sunday afternoons and at other times by appointment.

The museum quickly outgrew its first home as gifts and loans expanded the collection. In 1979, the museum moved into its second historic building, the Bank of Smithfield, built in 1913 and located at 103 Main Street. That same year, the museum commission became a committee under the Isle of Wight County Public Recreational Facilities Authority, which assumed oversight of the museum.

In 1990, the Folk Building, a former dry goods store also built in 1913 and located adjacent to the museum, was purchased for the museum's expansion.

In 2006, the museum was placed under the newly formed Isle of Wight County Historic Resources Division as a part of Isle of Wight County's Parks and Recreation Department. Shortly thereafter, the division became part of the Smithfield and Isle of Wight County Tourism Department.

The museum's growth continued through October 2006 when a nor’easter left the basement flooded with three feet of standing water. Despite the devastating impact of the flood on the museum and its collection, staff, professionals from other Hampton Roads museums, volunteers, concerned citizens and the business community worked tirelessly to re-open the museum in 2008.

On June 30, 2014, Isle of Wight County Historic Resources Division was dissolved, and the museum staff members became employees of the Town of Smithfield. Isle of Wight County currently retains ownership of the museum's collection and the building itself.

Today, the museum continues to grow. Staffed with a full-time director and curator and several part-time docents, it is open seven days a week and offers special events, research opportunities, public outreach and educational programming to both in-person visitors and social media followers.

== Collections ==
The museum's exhibits include prehistoric fossils, colonial and pre-colonial artifacts, a turn-of-the-century country store, displays interpreting the Smithfield ham industry and the museum's most notable artifact: the world's oldest, edible cured ham.

== The World's Oldest Ham ==
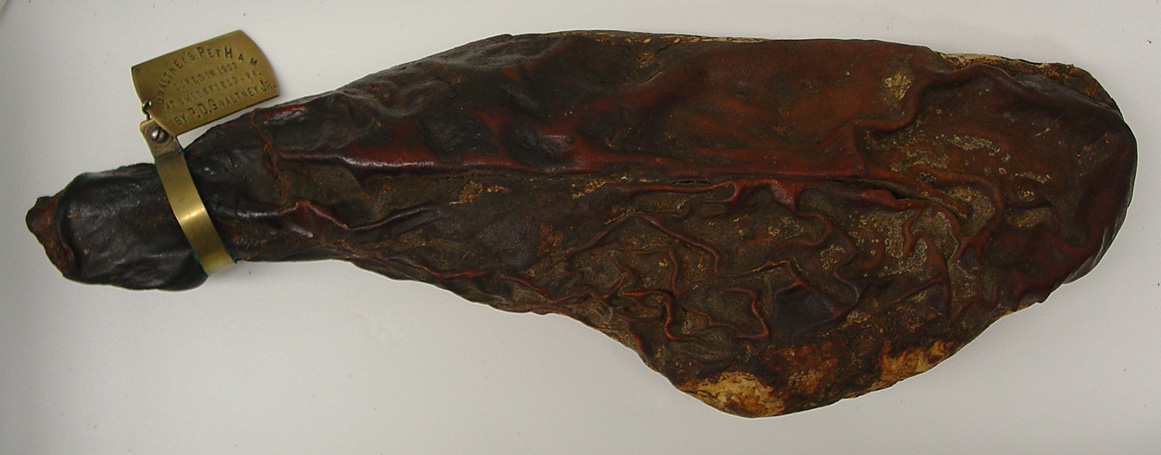
P.D. Gwaltney's "pet ham", thought to be the world's oldest. Gwaltney used the ham to demonstrate his techniques for meat preservation.

P.D. Gwaltney Jr.’s famous pet ham currently resides at the Isle of Wight County Museum. In 1902, a cured ham was overlooked, and for 20 years, the ham hung from a rafter in one of Gwaltney's packing houses. By 1924, the pet ham was kept in an iron safe which was opened daily for guests to view. Advertised as the world's oldest Smithfield ham, Gwaltney fashioned a brass collar for the ham and took it to shows and expos to exhibit the preservative powers of his smoking method. The ham was featured in Ripley's Believe It or Not! in 1929, 1932 and 2003.

The museum hosts an annual birthday party for the ham each July, and the museum's Ham Cam keeps tabs on the ham throughout the day.
