= P. D. Gwaltney Jr. House =

Historic house in Virginia, United States

- U.S. National Register of Historic Places
- U.S. Historic district – Contributing property
- Virginia Landmarks Register
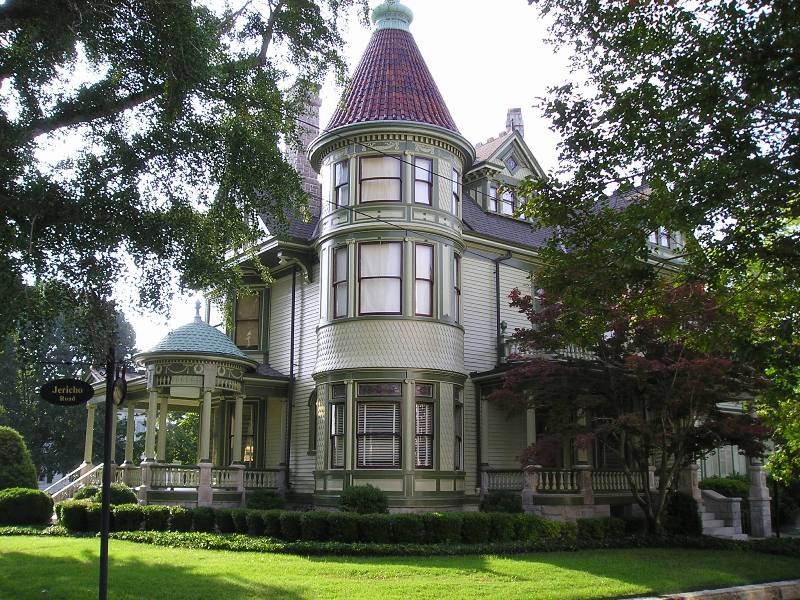
- P. D. Gwaltney Jr. House, June 2010

- Location within Virginia Location within the United States
- Location: 304 Church St., Smithfield, Virginia
- Coordinates: 36°58′53″N 76°37′42″W
- Area: 0.5 acres (0.20 ha)
- Built: 1900
- Architect: George Franklin Barber (1854–1915)
- Architectural style: Queen Anne
- NRHP reference No.: 99000075
- VLR No.: 300-0054

Significant dates
- Added to NRHP: January 27, 1999
- Designated VLR: December 10, 1998

P. D. Gwaltney Jr. House is a historic home located at Smithfield, Isle of Wight County, Virginia. The house was built about 1900, and is a large two-story, rectangular, Queen Anne style wood frame mansion with three porches. It features an elaborate profile punctuated by a corner turret, projecting bays, and a complex roof form. It was the primary residence of Pembroke Decatur Gwaltney Jr. of the Gwaltney meat empire.

It was listed on the National Register of Historic Places in 1999. It is located in the Smithfield Historic District.

The mansion remained in the Gwaltney family until 2016.
