= Windsor Castle (Smithfield, Virginia) =

Historic house in Virginia, United States

- Windsor Castle Farm
- U.S. National Register of Historic Places
- U.S. Historic district – Contributing property
- Virginia Landmarks Register
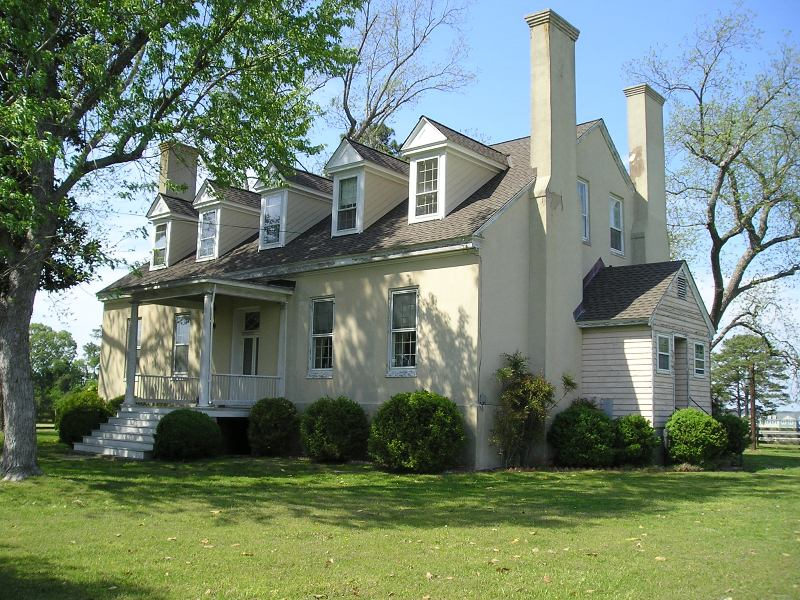
- Back of the manor house

- Location within Virginia Location within the United States
- Nearest city: Smithfield, Virginia
- Coordinates: 36°58′32″N 76°37′35″W
- Area: 158.3 acres (64.1 ha)
- Built: 1750
- Architectural style: Greek Revival
- NRHP reference No.: 00000897
- VLR No.: 300-5033

Significant dates
- Added to NRHP: August 2, 2000
- Designated VLR: June 14, 2000

Windsor Castle is a former plantation and now a public park in Smithfield, Virginia, United States. It is located in the Smithfield Historic District.

== History ==
The plantation dates to a land grant of 1,450 acres (590 ha) by the King of England to Arthur Smith in 1637. Arthur Smith's great grandson, Arthur Smith IV, established the town of Smithfield in 1750. The first recorded use of the name "Windsor Castle" dates from 1884.

In 2005, real estate developer Lewis McMurran obtained an option to purchase Windsor Castle for $2.2 million. The agreement included a historic easement around the manor house. McMurran proposed to build a 445-unit "New Urbanism" development on the property outside the historic easement. The proposal was withdrawn amidst strong opposition from town residents.

In 2007, Joseph W. Luter III donated $5 million to the town for the purchase and development of Windsor Castle as a park. Lewis McMurran then executed his option to purchase the property. The town council voted to pursue the use of eminent domain to obtain the property. In 2009, an out-of-court agreement was negotiated for the town to purchase the property outside the historic easement for $3.8 million and for McMurran to donate to the town the property within the historic easement.

The manor house and surrounding 208 acres (84 ha) were dedicated as a public park in 2010. The 46 acres (190,000 m^{2}) immediately surrounding the manor house are protected by a historic easement controlled by the state of Virginia. The park was formally opened during a ceremony officiated by the Virginia Governor Bob McDonnell on May 22, 2010. The park was designed by Mr. Lawrence Pitt and features hiking trails, a dog park, a mountain bike trail, a fishing pier, and a canoe/kayak launch. The manor house overlooks the junction of Cypress Creek and the Pagan River. The King of All Places manor house (circa 1806) can be seen across Cypress Creek from the Windsor Castle property.

On April 2, 2013, it was reported in the Virginian-Pilot that the Smithfield Town Council has leased five acres at Windsor Castle Park to Smithfield Winery LLC to establish a vineyard for a small-production winery. The vineyard operation was terminated in 2019.

== Gallery ==
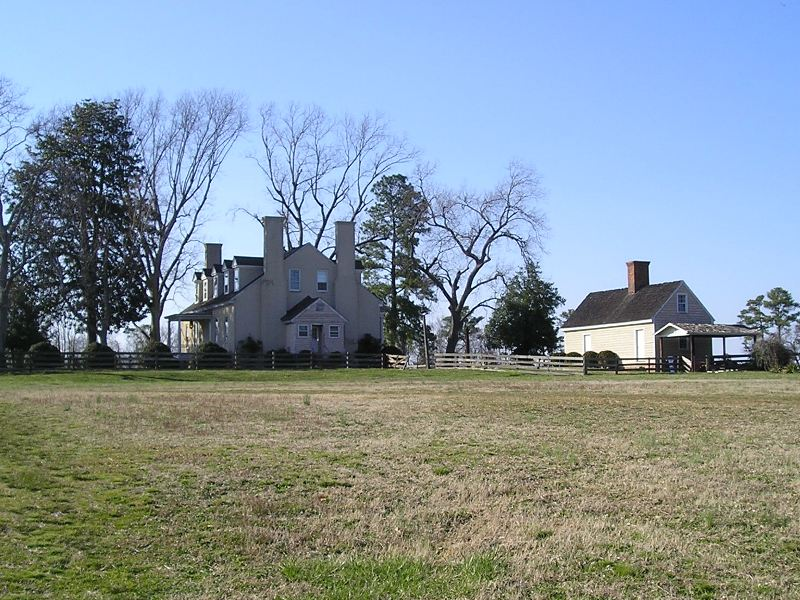
Manor house and kitchen

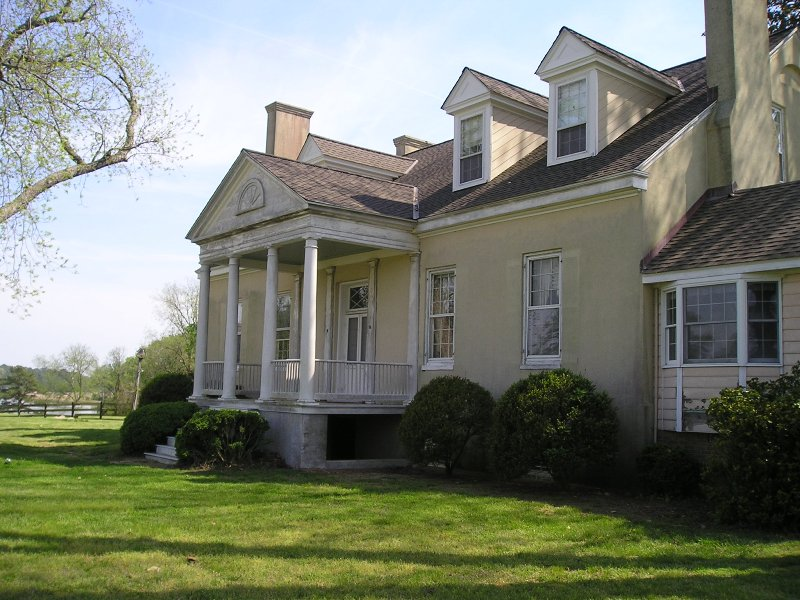
Front porch of manor house

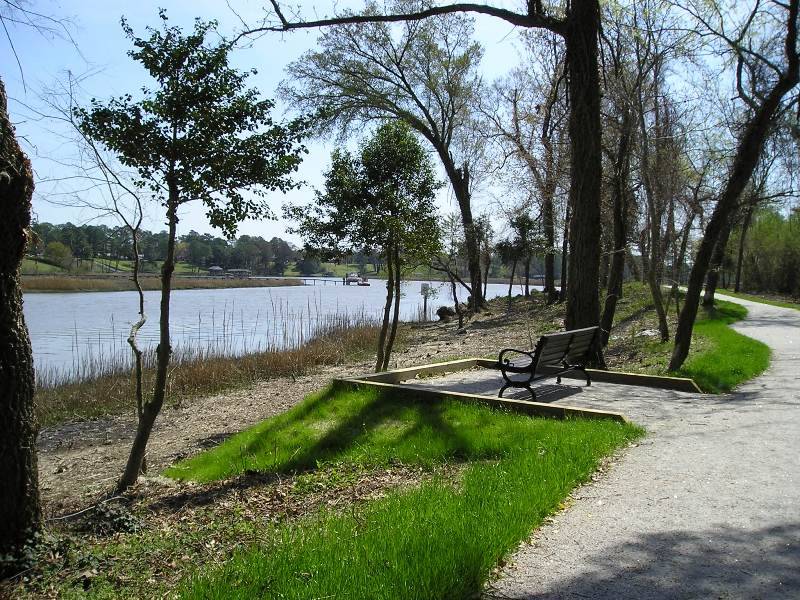
Bench along Cypress Creek

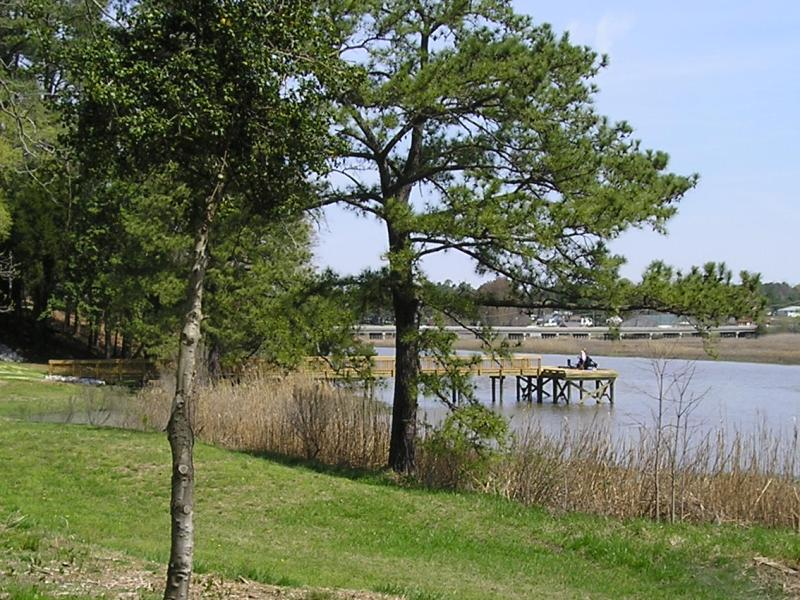
Fishing pier on Cypress Creek

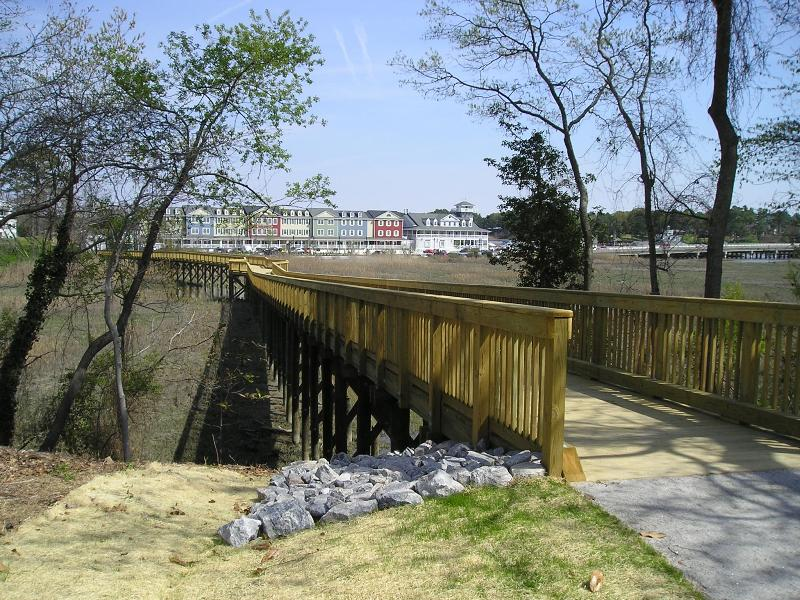
Bridge to Smithfield Station

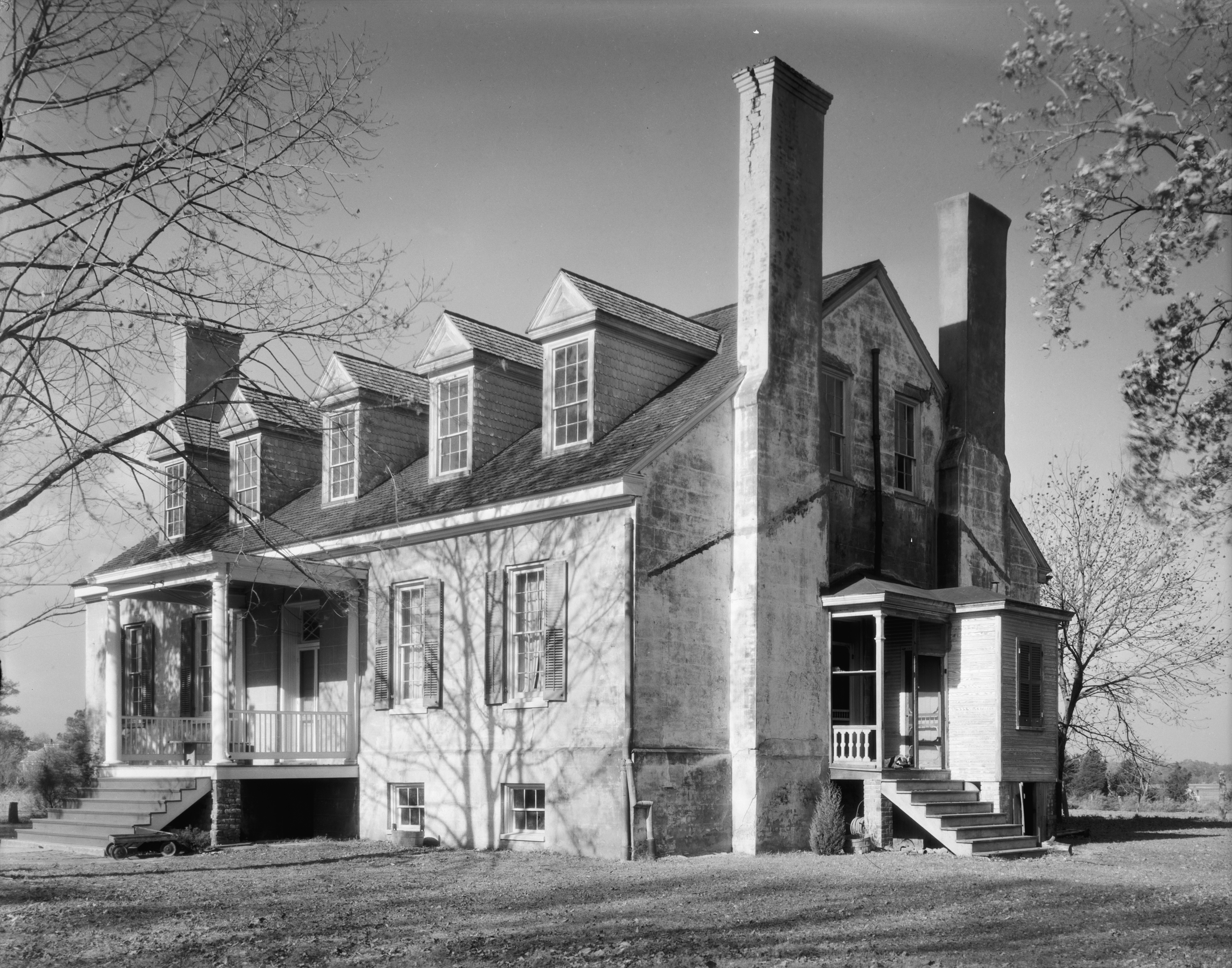
Windsor Castle by Frances Benjamin Johnston, 1935.
