= Robert Tynes House =

Historic house in Virginia, United States

- U.S. National Register of Historic Places
- Virginia Landmarks Register
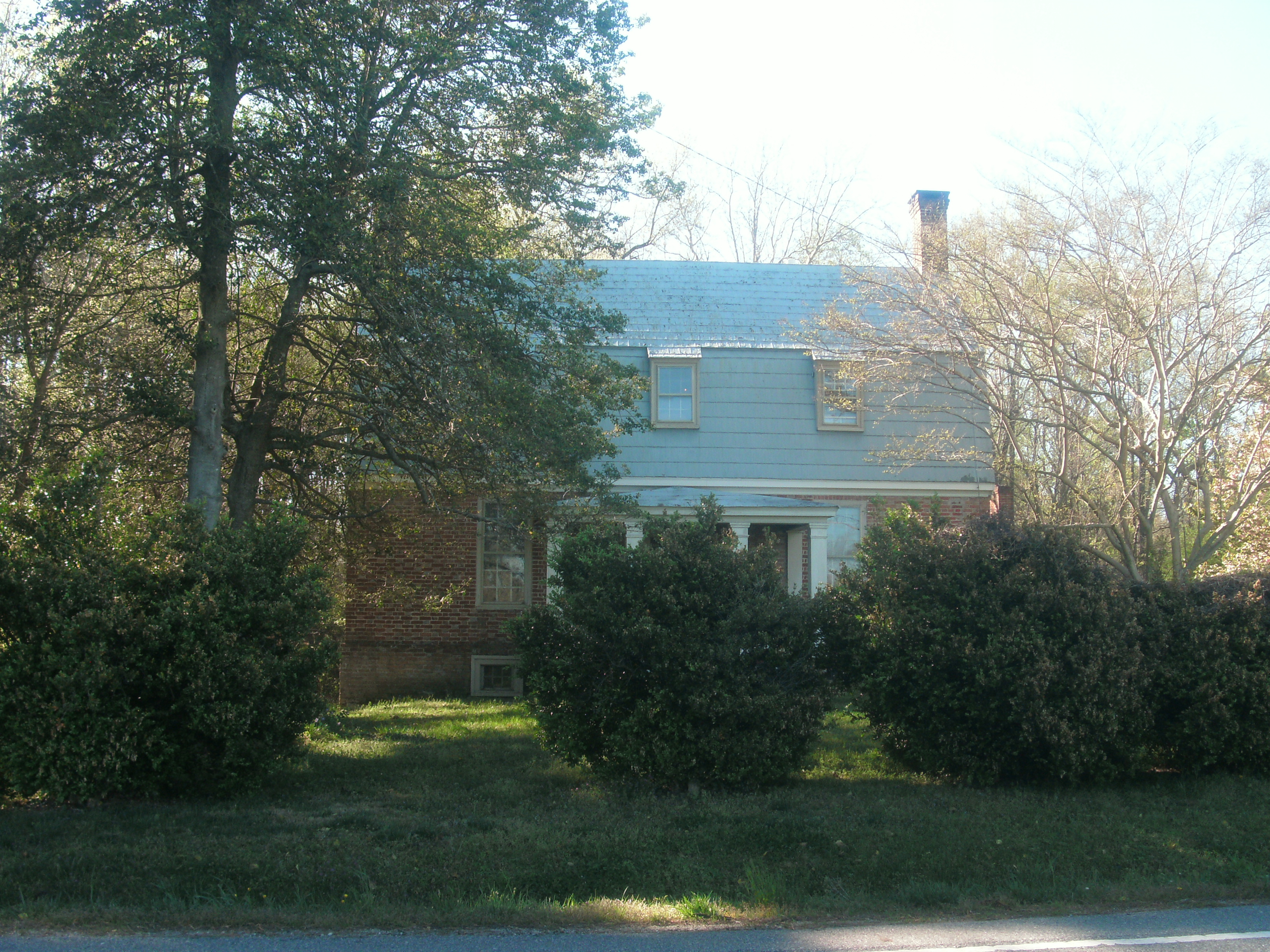
- The Tynes House in April 2017

- Location within Virginia Location within the United States
- Location: 13060 Courthouse Hwy., near Smithfield, Virginia
- Coordinates: 36°57′54″N 76°39′47″W
- Area: 1.3 acres (0.53 ha)
- Built: 1750
- Architectural style: Georgian
- NRHP reference No.: 07000194
- VLR No.: 046-0002

Significant dates
- Added to NRHP: March 21, 2007
- Designated VLR: September 6, 2006

Robert Tynes House, also known as Tynes Plantation, is a historic plantation house located near Smithfield, Isle of Wight County, Virginia. The house was built in 1750 and is a two-story, three-bay, Georgian style brick dwelling with a gambrel roof. The interior features a center-passage single-pile plan. Also on the property are the contributing garden and well, smokehouse / frame shed, and kitchen foundation. In 1802, its owner Timothy Tynes granted manumission of his 81 slaves and the division of his 4,000 acre estate primarily to his slaves.

It was listed on the National Register of Historic Places in 2007.
