= Oak Crest =

Historic house in Virginia, United States

- U.S. National Register of Historic Places
- Virginia Landmarks Register
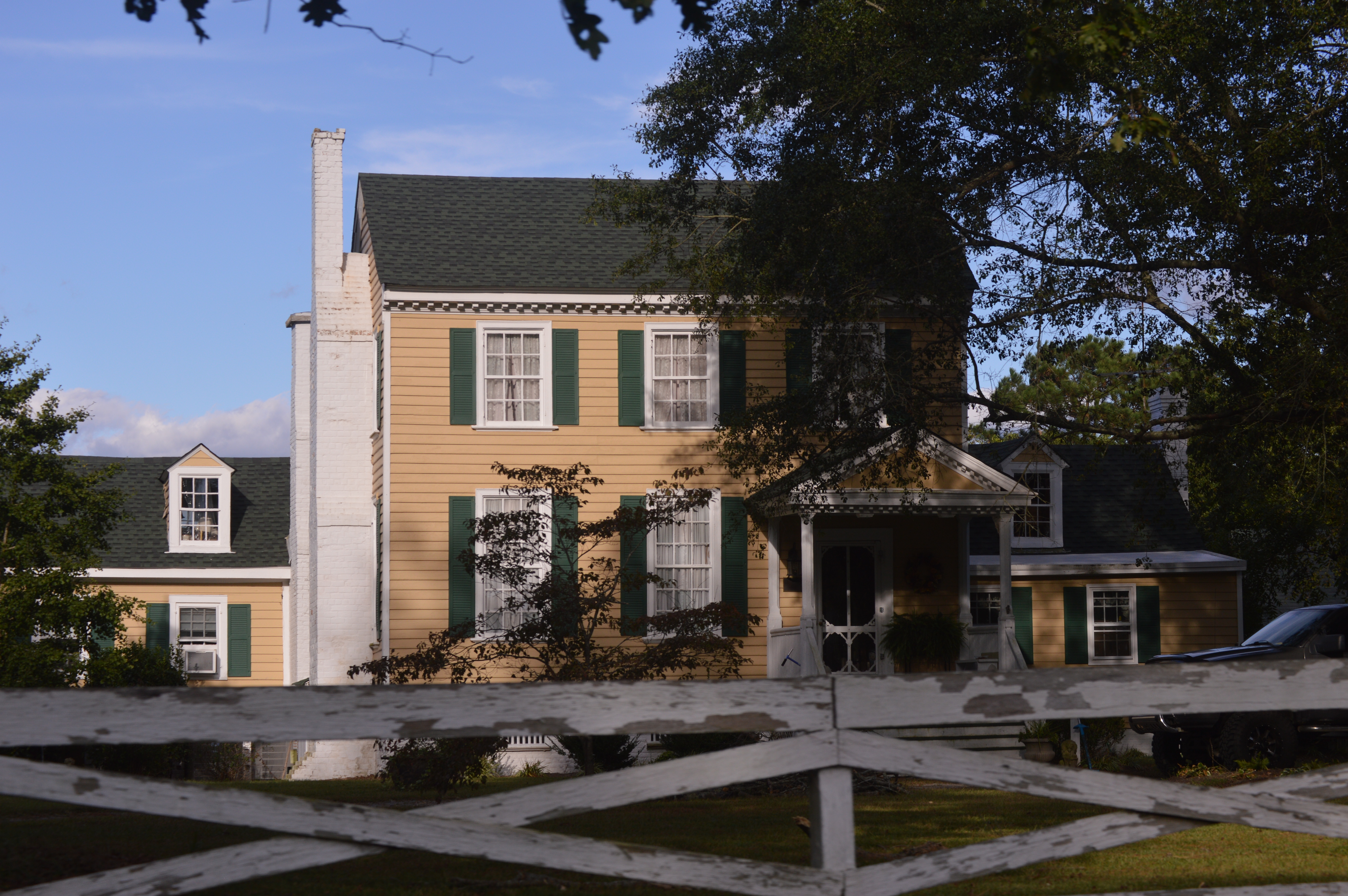
- Roadside view

- Location within Virginia Location within the United States
- Location: 34457 Lee's Mill Rd., Franklin, Virginia
- Coordinates: 36°40′16″N 76°53′6″W
- Area: 2.5 acres (1.0 ha)
- Built: 1790
- Architectural style: Federal
- NRHP reference No.: 98001648
- VLR No.: 046-0019

Significant dates
- Added to NRHP: January 21, 1999
- Designated VLR: December 10, 1998

Oak Crest, also known as Cutchin Home and Holland-Cutchin House, is a historic home located at Franklin, Isle of Wight County, Virginia. The main block was built between 1799 and 1810, and is a two-story, three-bay, single-pile, side-passage plan frame dwelling in the Federal style. Later additions include a 1 1/2-story rear ell added about 1810, and 1 1/2-story wings built in 1900 and 1935. Also on the property are the contributing smokehouse, poultry shelter (c. 1930), horse barn (c. 1930), and pumphouse (c. 1930).

It was listed on the National Register of Historic Places in 1999.
