= Poplar Hill (Smithfield, Virginia) =

Historic house in Virginia, United States

- U.S. National Register of Historic Places
- Virginia Landmarks Register
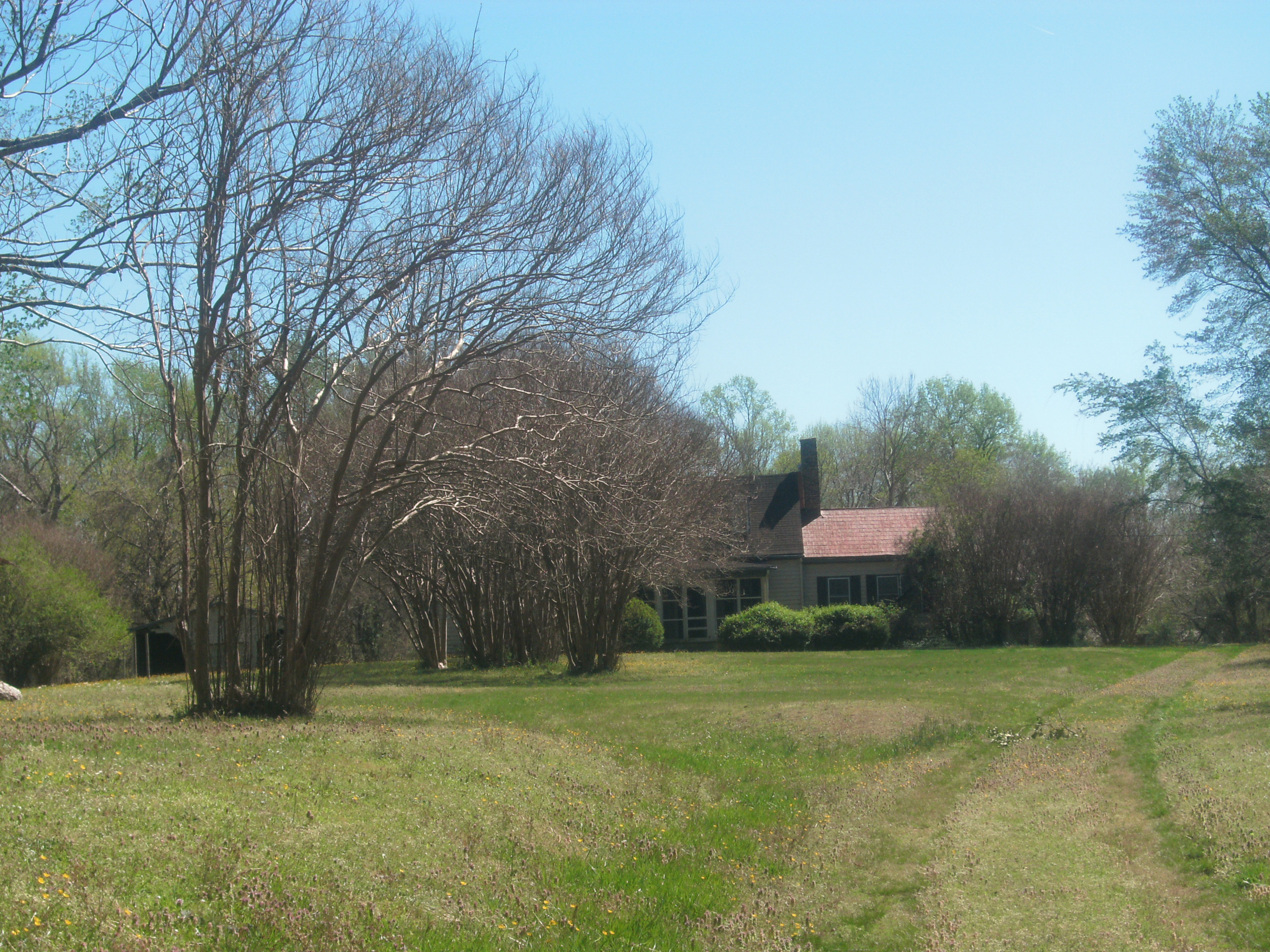
- Poplar Hill in April, 2017

- Location within Virginia Location within the United States
- Location: 7968 Purvis Ln. (VA 673), 0.9 mi. NW of jct. with VA 677, near Smithfield, Virginia
- Coordinates: 37°2′5″N 76°40′54″W
- Area: 6 acres (2.4 ha)
- Built: 1793
- Architectural style: Early Republic
- NRHP reference No.: 95000975
- VLR No.: 046-0096

Significant dates
- Added to NRHP: August 18, 1995
- Designated VLR: June 27, 1995

Poplar Hill is a historic house located near Smithfield, Isle of Wight County, Virginia. The house was built about 1793, and is a 1 1/2-story, frame, hall and parlor-plan dwelling. It has an early 19th-century lean-to rear addition, a post American Civil War kitchen addition, a 1920s one-room addition, and a screened-in front porch on the main facade. Also on the property are the contributing wash house, shed, garage, and stable, and the sites of a smokehouse, kitchen, carriage house, and ice house.

It was listed on the National Register of Historic Places in 1995.
