= Old Isle of Wight Courthouse =

Historic courthouse in Virginia, US

- Old 1750 Isle of Wight Courthouse
- U.S. National Register of Historic Places
- U.S. Historic district – Contributing property
- Virginia Landmarks Register
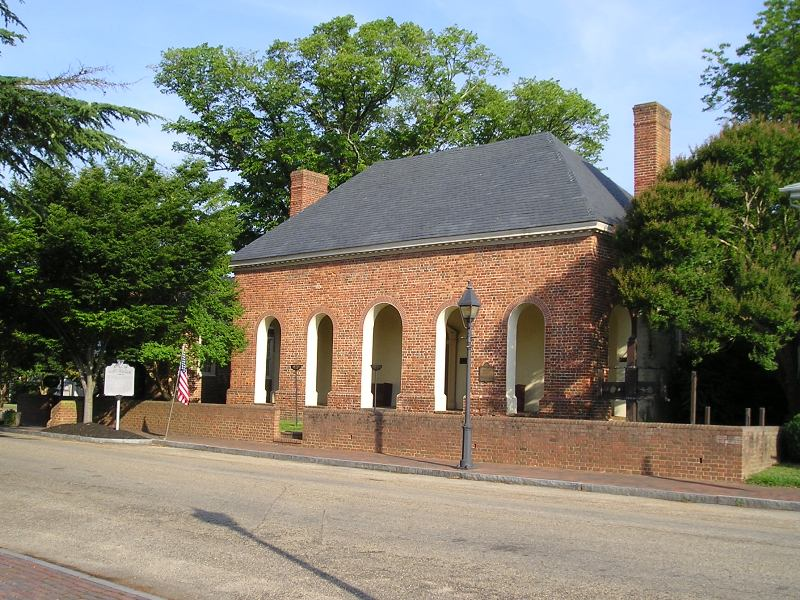
- Old Isle of Wight Courthouse

- Location within Virginia Location within the United States
- Interactive map showing the location of Old Isle of Wight Courthouse
- Location: NE corner of Main and Mason Sts., Smithfield, Virginia
- Coordinates: 36°58′54″N 76°37′56″W
- Area: 1 acre (0.40 ha)
- Built: 1750
- Part of: Smithfield Historic District (ID73002022)
- NRHP reference No.: 70000802
- VLR No.: 300-0002

Significant dates
- Added to NRHP: September 15, 1970
- Designated CP: July 2, 1973
- Designated VLR: June 2, 1970

The Old Isle of Wight Courthouse was built in 1750-51 and was used as the main courthouse for Isle of Wight County, Virginia until a new courthouse was built at Isle of Wight, Virginia in 1800. It is located in the Historic District in the town of Smithfield.

== History ==
During its 50 years of use as the county courthouse, it was considered the center of life in Isle of Wight and in the town of Smithfield, which was incorporated in 1752. It was constructed by William Rand, and featured a distinctive semi-circular apse and conical roof found in many English churches of the period and echoing the Colonial Capitol in Williamsburg. An adjacent clerk's office was constructed in 1799, although it was only in use for its intended purpose for a year, before the new courthouse at Isle of Wight was constructed. The old Smithfield courthouse was later modified into a family residence. To do so, the arcade was blocked and the roof converted to a gable.

== Preservation ==
The courthouse and clerk's office were acquired by Preservation Virginia in 1938 and an extensive restoration project was completed in 1959.

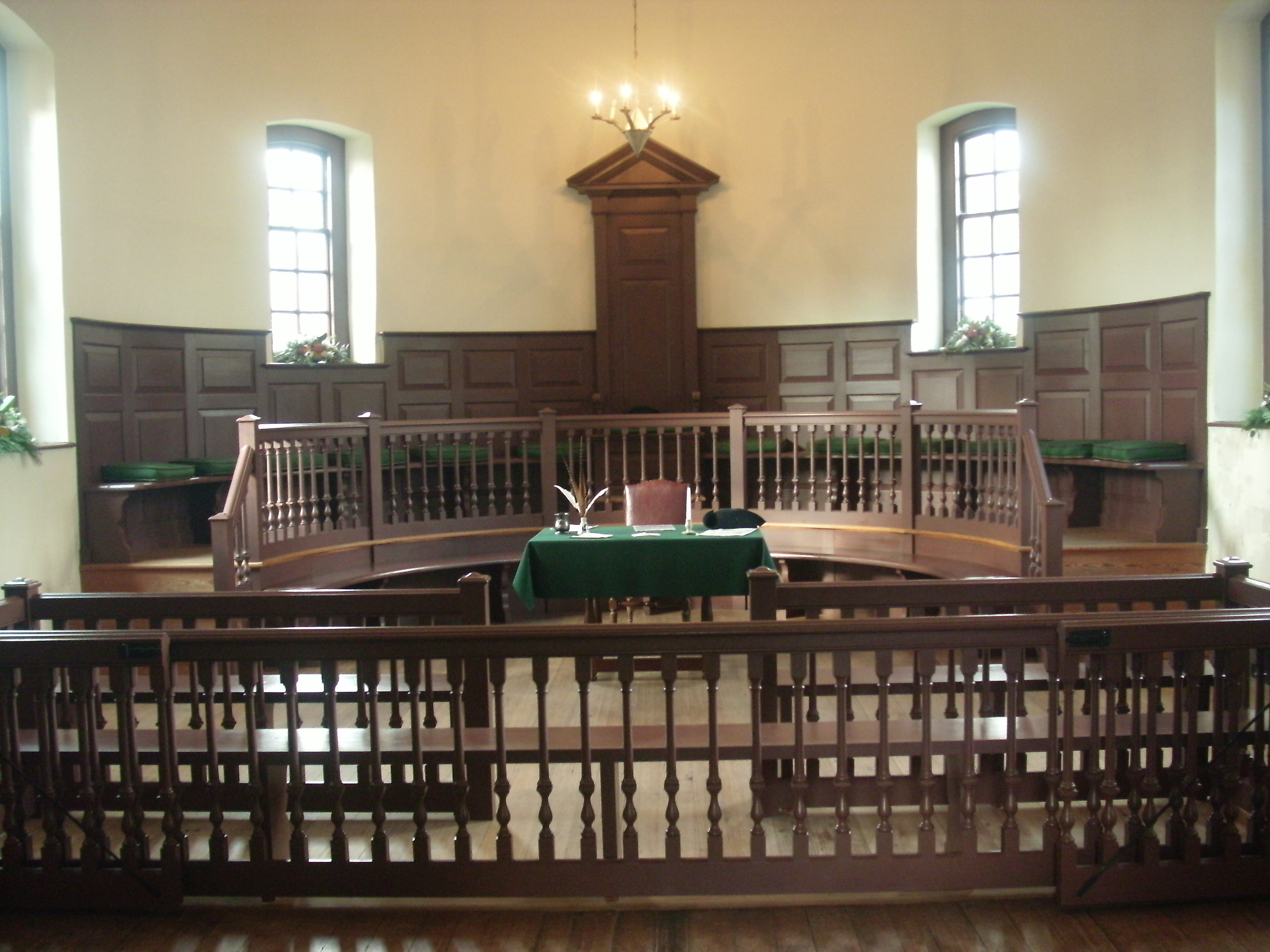
Recreated interior, seen in 2011

A second restoration of the courthouse was undertaken in the late 1990s with the help of Colonial Williamsburg consultants and craftsmen, in which the interior was modified to more accurately recreate the appearance of a typical Virginia courthouse of the period.

The building is one of four remaining examples of arcaded colonial courthouses.

In 2013, ownership passed from Preservation Virginia to the non-profit Historic Smithfield, and on May 18, 2024 the property was officially deeded to the 1750 Courthouse Board, which for the past 11 years has operated as a semi-independent group under Historic Smithfield, tasked with raising funds for the historic building’s upkeep.
