= Rushmere, Virginia =

- Census-designated place
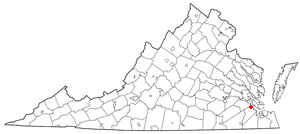
- Location of Rushmere, Virginia
- Coordinates: 37°4′43″N 76°40′28″W
- Country: United States
- State: Virginia
- County: Isle of Wight

Area
  - Total: 8.4 sq mi (21.8 km^{2})
  - Land: 8.3 sq mi (21.4 km^{2})
  - Water: 0.15 sq mi (0.4 km^{2})
- Elevation: 72 ft (22 m)

Population (2010)
  - Total: 1,018
  - Density: 124/sq mi (47.7/km^{2})
- Time zone: UTC−5 (Eastern (EST))
  - Summer (DST): UTC−4 (EDT)
- FIPS code: 51-69472
- GNIS feature ID: 1473642

Rushmere is a census-designated place (CDP) in Isle of Wight County, Virginia, United States. As of the 2020 census, Rushmere had a population of 1,175.

== Geography ==
Rushmere is located in the northern corner of Isle of Wight County at 37°4′43″N 76°40′28″W (37.078580, −76.674436). It is located on the James River at Burwell Bay and is bordered to the northwest by Lawnes Creek, an inlet of the James. Surry County borders Rushmere to the northwest across Lawnes Creek, and Newport News is to the east across the James River.

Virginia State Route 10 passes through the community, leading northwest 11 miles (18 km) to Surry and south 7 miles (11 km) to Smithfield.

According to the United States Census Bureau, the Rushmere CDP has a total area of 8.4 square miles (21.8 km^{2}), of which 8.3 square miles (21.4 km^{2}) are land and 0.2 square miles (0.4 km^{2}), or 1.86%, are water.

== Demographics ==
Historical population
Census	Pop.	Note	%±
2000	1,083		—
2010	1,018		−6.0%
2020	1,175		15.4%
U.S. Decennial Census; 2010 2020

=== Racial and ethnic composition ===
Rushmere CDP, Virginia – Racial and ethnic composition Note: the US Census treats Hispanic/Latino as an ethnic category. This table excludes Latinos from the racial categories and assigns them to a separate category. Hispanics/Latinos may be of any race.
Race / Ethnicity (NH = Non-Hispanic)	Pop 2000	Pop 2010	Pop 2020	% 2000	% 2010	% 2020
White alone (NH)	391	385	561	36.10%	37.82%	47.74%
Black or African American alone (NH)	670	612	532	61.87%	60.12%	45.28%
Native American or Alaska Native alone (NH)	7	5	12	0.65%	0.49%	1.02%
Asian alone (NH)	3	2	5	0.28%	0.20%	0.43%
Native Hawaiian or Pacific Islander alone (NH)	0	0	0	0.00%	0.00%	0.00%
Other race alone (NH)	0	4	4	0.00%	0.39%	0.34%
Mixed race or Multiracial (NH)	3	6	49	0.28%	0.59%	4.17%
Hispanic or Latino (any race)	9	4	12	0.83%	0.39%	1.02%
Total	1,083	1,018	1,175	100.00%	100.00%	100.00%

=== 2000 census ===
As of the census of 2000, there were 1,083 people, 435 households, and 313 families residing in the CDP. The population density was 129.6 people per square mile (50.1/km^{2}). There were 529 housing units at an average density of 63.3/sq mi (24.5/km^{2}). The racial makeup of the CDP was 36.38% White, 62.14% African American, 0.65% Native American, 0.28% Asian, and 0.55% from two or more races. Hispanic or Latino of any race were 0.83% of the population.

There were 435 households, out of which 23.7% had children under the age of 18 living with them, 52.6% were married couples living together, 13.1% had a female householder with no husband present, and 28.0% were non-families. 24.1% of all households were made up of individuals, and 8.3% had someone living alone who was 65 years of age or older. The average household size was 2.49 and the average family size was 2.95.

In the CDP, the population was spread out, with 21.6% under the age of 18, 5.6% from 18 to 24, 28.4% from 25 to 44, 29.8% from 45 to 64, and 14.5% who were 65 years of age or older. The median age was 42 years. For every 100 females, there were 99.4 males. For every 100 females age 18 and over, there were 91.6 males.

The median income for a household in the CDP was $40,794, and the median income for a family was $41,426. Males had a median income of $34,750 versus $21,389 for females. The per capita income for the CDP was $20,722. About 9.5% of families and 12.4% of the population were below the poverty line, including 25.2% of those under age 18 and 16.9% of those age 65 or over.

== Climate ==
The climate in this area is characterized by hot, humid summers and generally mild to cool winters. According to the Köppen Climate Classification system, Rushmere has a humid subtropical climate, abbreviated "Cfa" on climate maps.
