= Smithfield Historic District (Virginia) =

Historic district in Virginia, United States

- U.S. National Register of Historic Places
- U.S. Historic district
- Virginia Landmarks Register
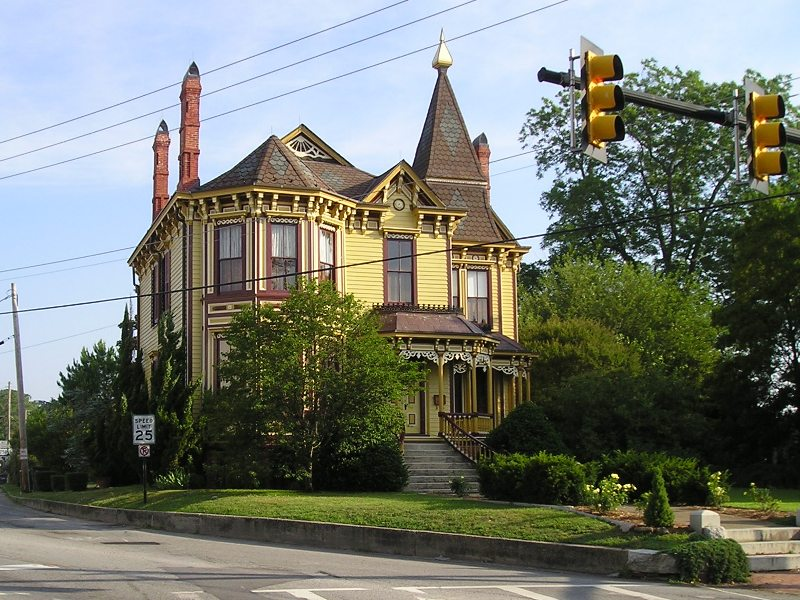
- Thomas House (1889), Smithfield Historic District, June 2010

- Location within Virginia Location within the United States
- Location: Roughly bounded by Pagan River, Little Creek, and town line, Smithfield, Virginia
- Coordinates: 36°58′53″N 76°37′56″W
- Area: 200 acres (81 ha)
- Built by: Rand, William
- Architectural style: Georgian, Romanesque, Federal
- NRHP reference No.: 73002022
- VLR No.: 300-0087

Significant dates
- Added to NRHP: July 2, 1973
- Designated VLR: February 20, 1973

Smithfield Historic District is a national historic district located at Smithfield, Isle of Wight County, Virginia. It encompasses 289 contributing buildings and 2 contributing structures in the historic downtown and surrounding residential areas of Smithfield. There are 211 houses, 37 commercial buildings, 1 warehouse, 4 churches, 10 barns, 1 smokehouse, 23 garages, 1 farm office, 1 colonial kitchen, and 2 corncrib structures. Notable buildings include the original county clerk's office (1799), county jail, Wentworth-Barrett House (c. 1752), Wentworth–Grinnan House (c. 1780), King-Atkinson House (c. 1800), Smith-Morrison House (1770s), Hayden Hall (c. 1810, c. 1846), Boykin House (c. 1876), Goodrich House (1886), Thomas House (1889), Smithfield Academy (1827), Christ Episcopal Church (1832, 1892), and Hill Street Baptist Church (1923). Located in the district and separately listed are the Old Isle of Wight Courthouse, Smithfield Inn, Windsor Castle Farm, and P. D. Gwaltney Jr. House.

It was listed on the National Register of Historic Places in 1973.
