= William Rand Tavern =

Historic building in Virginia, US

- U.S. National Register of Historic Places
- U.S. Historic district – Contributing property
- Virginia Landmarks Register
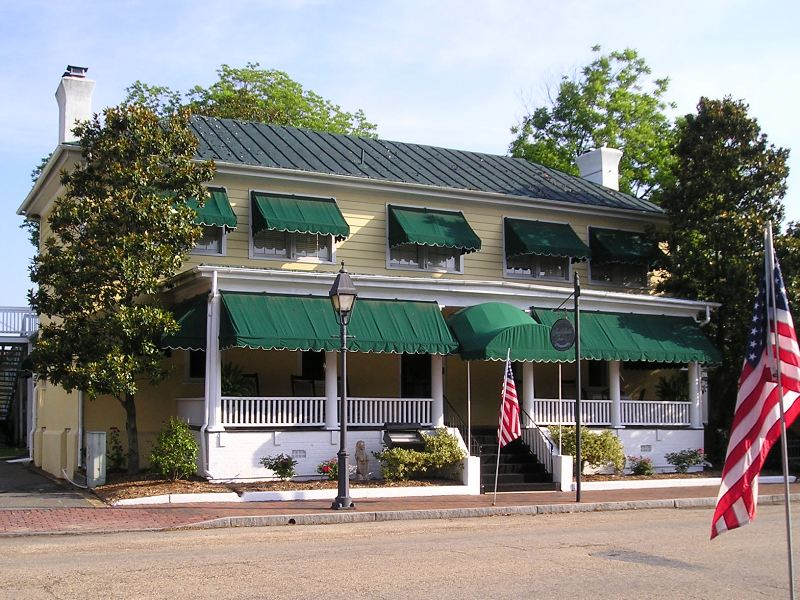
- William Rand Tavern, June 2010

- Location within Virginia Location within the United States
- Location: 112 W. Main St., Smithfield, Virginia
- Coordinates: 36°58′55″N 76°37′56″W
- Area: 0.2 acres (0.081 ha)
- Built: c. 1752, 1922-1923
- Architectural style: Georgian
- NRHP reference No.: 04000548
- VLR No.: 300-0037

Significant dates
- Added to NRHP: May 27, 2004
- Designated VLR: March 17, 2004

William Rand Tavern, also known as Rectory of the Christ Episcopal Church, Sykes Inn, and Smithfield Inn, is a historic inn and tavern located at Smithfield, Isle of Wight County, Virginia. It was built about 1752, and is a two-story, five-bay, Georgian style brick and frame building. It has a standing-seam metal hipped roof with parged brick chimneys at the building ends. A rear addition was built in 1922–1923. It opened as a tavern in 1759, and operated as such until 1854, when the Vestry of Christ Church purchased it. The church sold the property in 1892, and it resumed use as an inn in 1922. It is now operated as a bed and breakfast.

It was listed on the National Register of Historic Places in 2004. It is located in the Smithfield Historic District.
