= Four Square (Smithfield, Virginia) =

Historic house in Virginia, United States

- U.S. National Register of Historic Places
- Virginia Landmarks Register
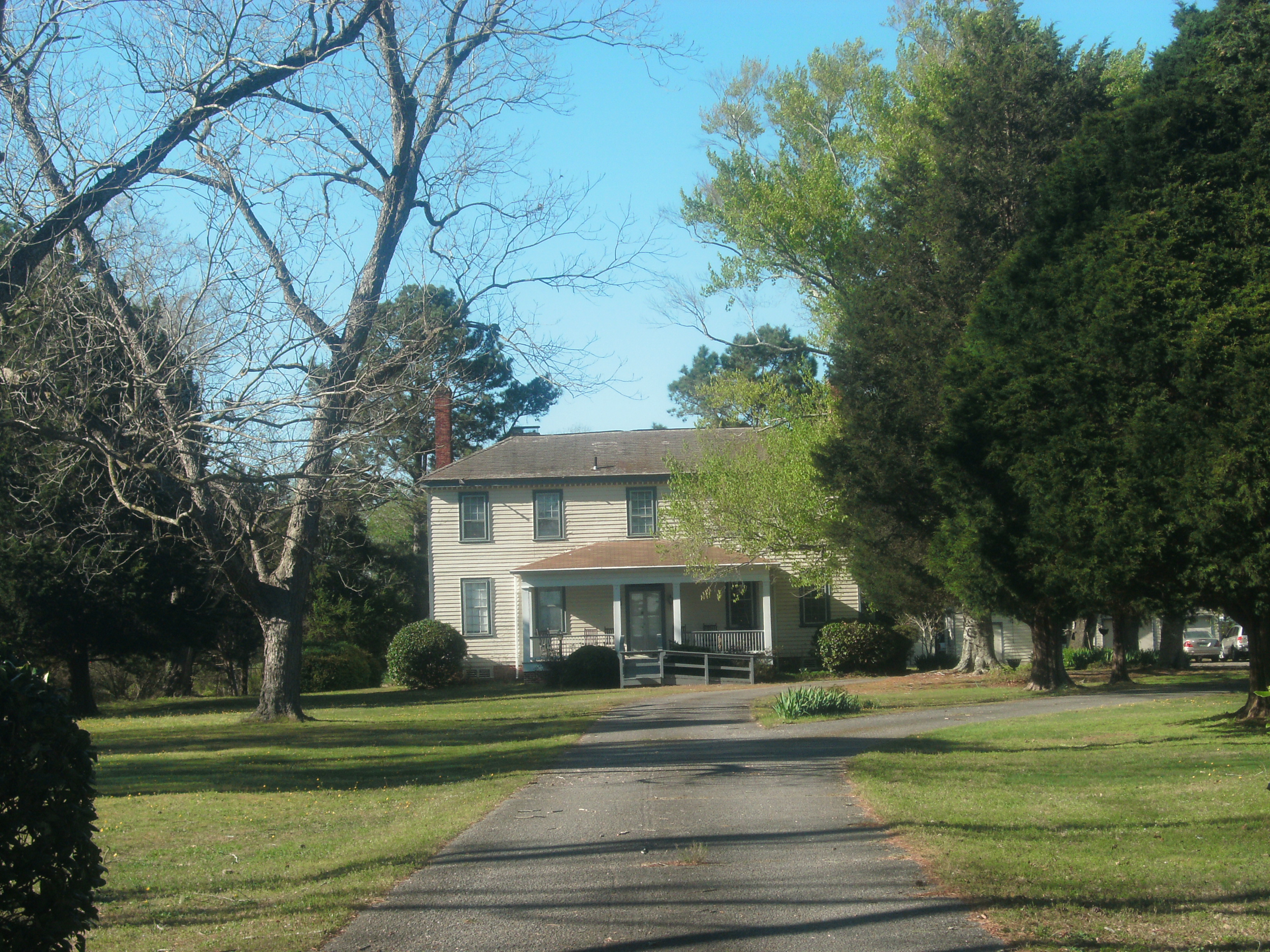
- Front of the house, April 2017

- Location within Virginia Location within the United States
- Location: W. of Smithfield on VA 620, near Smithfield, Virginia
- Coordinates: 36°57′54″N 76°41′30″W
- Area: 12 acres (4.9 ha)
- Built: 1807
- NRHP reference No.: 79003047
- VLR No.: 046-0026

Significant dates
- Added to NRHP: July 26, 1979
- Designated VLR: April 17, 1979

Four Square is a historic home and farm located near Smithfield, Isle of Wight County, Virginia. The original structure was built in 1807, and is a two-story, five-bay, L-shaped frame dwelling. Also on the property are eight contributing domestic outbuildings, and a variety of barns and other farm buildings.

It was listed on the National Register of Historic Places in 1979.
