= Wolftrap Farm =

Former historic house in Virginia, United States

- Formerly listed on the U.S. National Register of Historic Places
- Virginia Landmarks Register
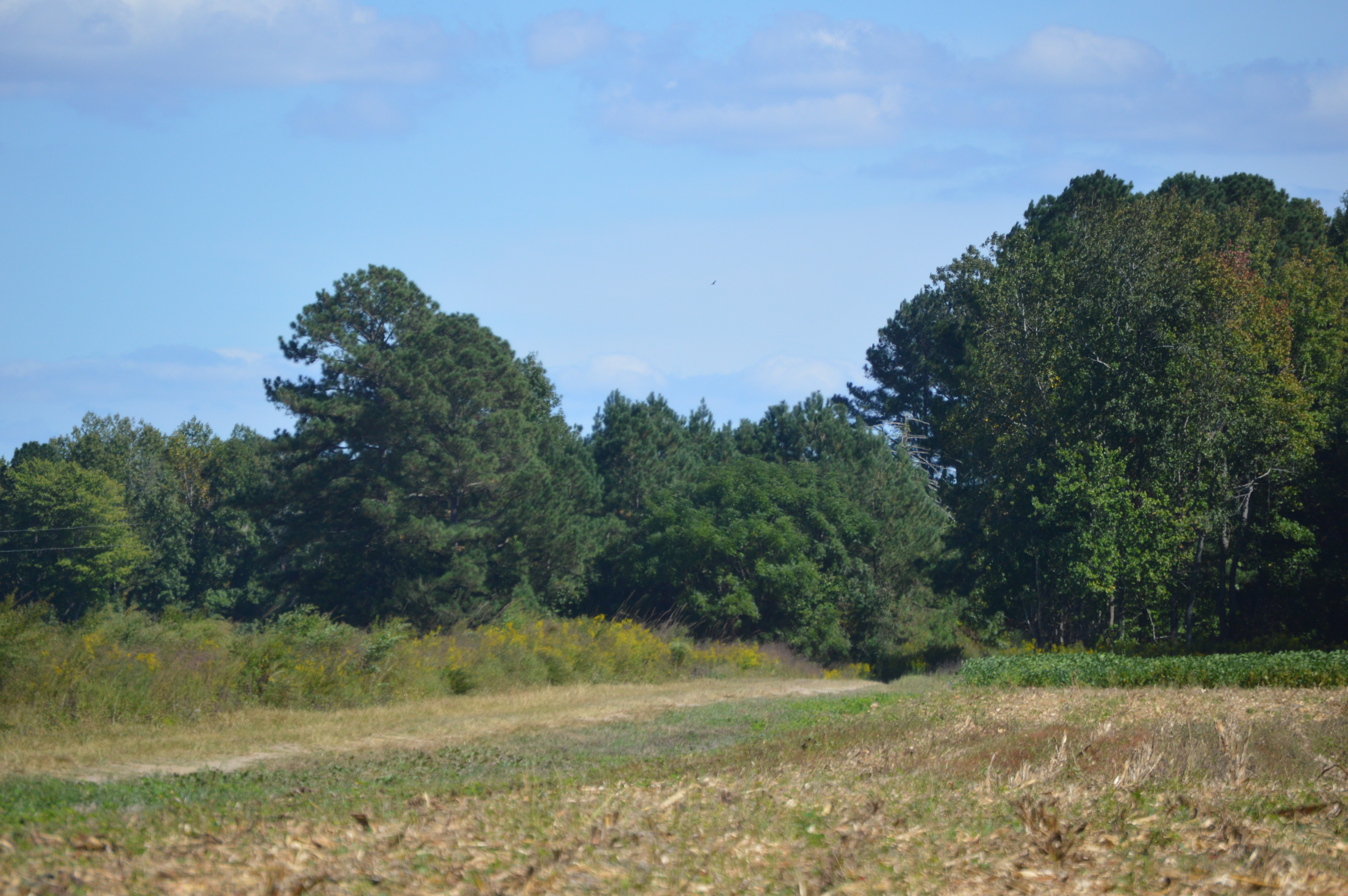
- Site of the house

- Location within Virginia Location within the United States
- Location: Northwest of Smithfield, Virginia, off Emmanuel Church Road
- Coordinates: 36°59′52″N 76°41′50″W
- Area: 5 acres (2.0 ha)
- Built: 1820
- Architectural style: Federal
- NRHP reference No.: 74002132
- VLR No.: 046-0070

Significant dates
- Added to NRHP: October 15, 1974
- Designated VLR: September 17, 1974
- Removed from NRHP: September 18, 2017

Wolftrap Farm was a historic home located near Smithfield, Isle of Wight County, Virginia. The house was built about 1820, and is a 2 1/2-story, three-bay, Federal style frame dwelling. It was a one-story rear elevation surmounted by a double tier of dormer windows. The house had a double-pile, hall-parlor plan and measures approximately 32 feet, 6 inches, square. The house has been dismantled.

It was listed on the National Register of Historic Places in 1974, and was delisted in 2017
