= Smithfield, Virginia =

- Town
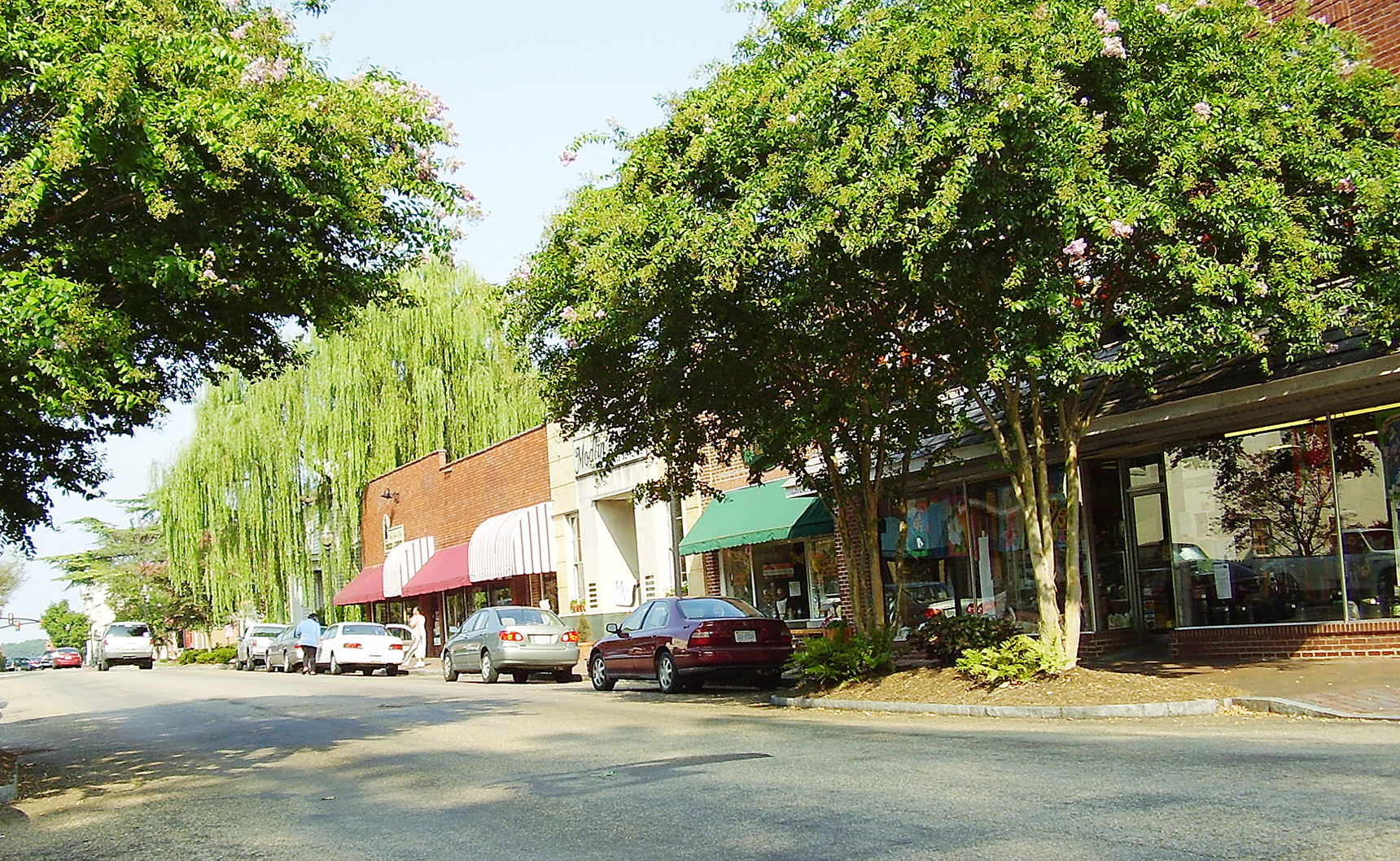
- Main Street, Smithfield

- Seal
- Nickname: The Ham Capital of the World
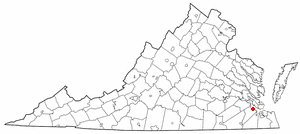
- Location in the Commonwealth of Virginia
- Coordinates: 36°58′44″N 76°37′7″W
- Country: United States
- State: Virginia
- County: Isle of Wight
- Incorporated (town): 1752

Government
  - Mayor: Steven G. Bowman

Area
  - Total: 10.65 sq mi (27.58 km^{2})
  - Land: 9.73 sq mi (25.19 km^{2})
  - Water: 0.92 sq mi (2.39 km^{2})
- Elevation: 30 ft (9.1 m)

Population (2020)
  - Total: 8,533
  - Estimate (2022): 8,867
  - Density: 871.5/sq mi (336.47/km^{2})
- Time zone: UTC-5 (EST)
  - Summer (DST): UTC-4 (EDT)
- ZIP codes: 23430-23431
- Area codes: 757, 948
- FIPS code: 51-73200
- GNIS feature ID: 1474779
- Website: www.smithfieldva.gov

Smithfield is a town in Isle of Wight County, in the South Hampton Roads subregion of the Hampton Roads region of Virginia, United States. The population was 8,533 at the 2020 census.

The town is most famous for the curing and production of the Smithfield ham. The Virginia General Assembly passed a statute defining "Smithfield ham" by law in 1926, with one of the requirements that it be processed within the town limits. Smithfield Foods, a Fortune 500 company that owns Smithfield Packing Company and others, is the world's largest pork processor and hog producer. The company, based in Smithfield, raises 12 million hogs and processes 20 million pounds of them annually. The company's largest shareholder is WH Group, a Chinese holding company who purchased the company in 2014 before it went public in 2025.

== History and industry ==
The area to later be called Smithfield was first colonized in 1634, is located on the Pagan River, south of Jamestown and on the south side of the James River. The Native Americans knew this area as Warascoyak, also spelled Warrosquoyacke, meaning "point of land."

The Virginia colony officially formed Warrosquyoake Shire (with numerous variant spellings, including Warrascoyack, Warrascocke and "Warwick Squeak") in 1634, but it had already been known as "Warascoyack County" before this. It was renamed as Isle of Wight County in 1637.

In 1730, the Tobacco Inspection Act of 1730 established "Warricksqueak Bay, in Isle of Wight County" as the site of an official tobacco inspection house.

The town was established as a seaport in 1752 by Arthur Smith IV. The original survey and plat of the Town of Smithfield was made by Jordan Thomas, County Surveyor, for "Captain Arthur Smith" in 1750.

As a river town, its life and growth were dependent on the river. "Wharf Hill" was the waterfront location of the beginning of the industries of Smithfield. They eventually included peanuts and the raising of pork as commodities, leading to the town claiming the titles of "Peanut Capital of the World" and later "Ham Capital of the World."

George Purdie, a County Justice and Postmaster of Smithfield during his lifetime, in 1763 purchased Lots 4 and 5 of the original plat of the Town of Smithfield. Purdie's neighbor, Captain Mallory Todd, developed the business of curing and shipping the hams that has made Smithfield world-famous. The peanut industry continued until the fire of 1921, which destroyed the peanut warehouses. The peanut trade moved to the nearby railroad hub of Suffolk, Virginia.

Military actions of both the Revolutionary and Civil War took place in and around the town, as it was considered strategic due to its proximity to the James River between Williamsburg and Richmond. Revolutionary Patriots used Wharf Hill as a safe harbor for receiving arms and supplies, and a vantage point for directing Federal cannon fire on Main Street. Its dock has welcomed the fictional drama of the real "Show Boat" (James Adams Floating Theatre).

The Mansion on Main was the showplace home of a Victorian-era "Virginian of Virginians", Richard Samuel "R.S." Thomas (1837–1915). It was restored by Sala Clark in the late 1990s. His 1889 "urban" Queen Ann-style mansion changed the face of Smithfield (which had been dominated by colonial and cottage styles). Thomas helped to preserve the 1632 St. Luke's Church, which in the late 20th century was recognized as a National Historic Landmark. Thomas literally "wrote the book" on St. Luke's Church, The Old Brick Church Near Smithfield, Virginia, specifically to champion recognition of its 1632 date of construction and legacy. He presented his work to the Virginia Historical Society on December 22, 1891.

He wrote: "It is my object to prove that this Church was built in 1632, and I shall prove it, 1. By the existence at that early date, of such strong, religious sentiment, as demanded a house of worship to the living God; 2. By tradition; 3. By lately existing records; and – 4. By the bricks and mortar of the Church itself." Architectural historians, archaeologists, and historians have examined the evidence and now suggest a completion date between 1685 and 1687.

Today, Smithfield has a population of 8,100. It is approximately 10.1 square miles (26 km^{2}) in size.

== Geography ==
Smithfield is located at 36°58′44″N 76°37′7″W (36.978767, -76.618578).

According to the United States Census Bureau, the town has a total area of 10.4 square miles (27.1 km^{2}), of which 9.5 square miles (24.7 km^{2}) is land and 0.9 square miles (2.4 km^{2}) (8.80%) is water.

== Demographics ==
Historical population
Census	Pop.	Note	%±
1850	733		—
1860	777		6.0%
1870	652		−16.1%
1880	814		24.8%
1890	891		9.5%
1900	1,225		37.5%
1910	1,278		4.3%
1920	1,181		−7.6%
1930	1,179		−0.2%
1940	1,178		−0.1%
1950	1,180		0.2%
1960	917		−22.3%
1970	2,713		195.9%
1980	3,718		37.0%
1990	4,686		26.0%
2000	6,324		35.0%
2010	8,089		27.9%
2020	8,533		5.5%
2022 (est.)	8,867	▲	3.9%
U.S. Decennial Census

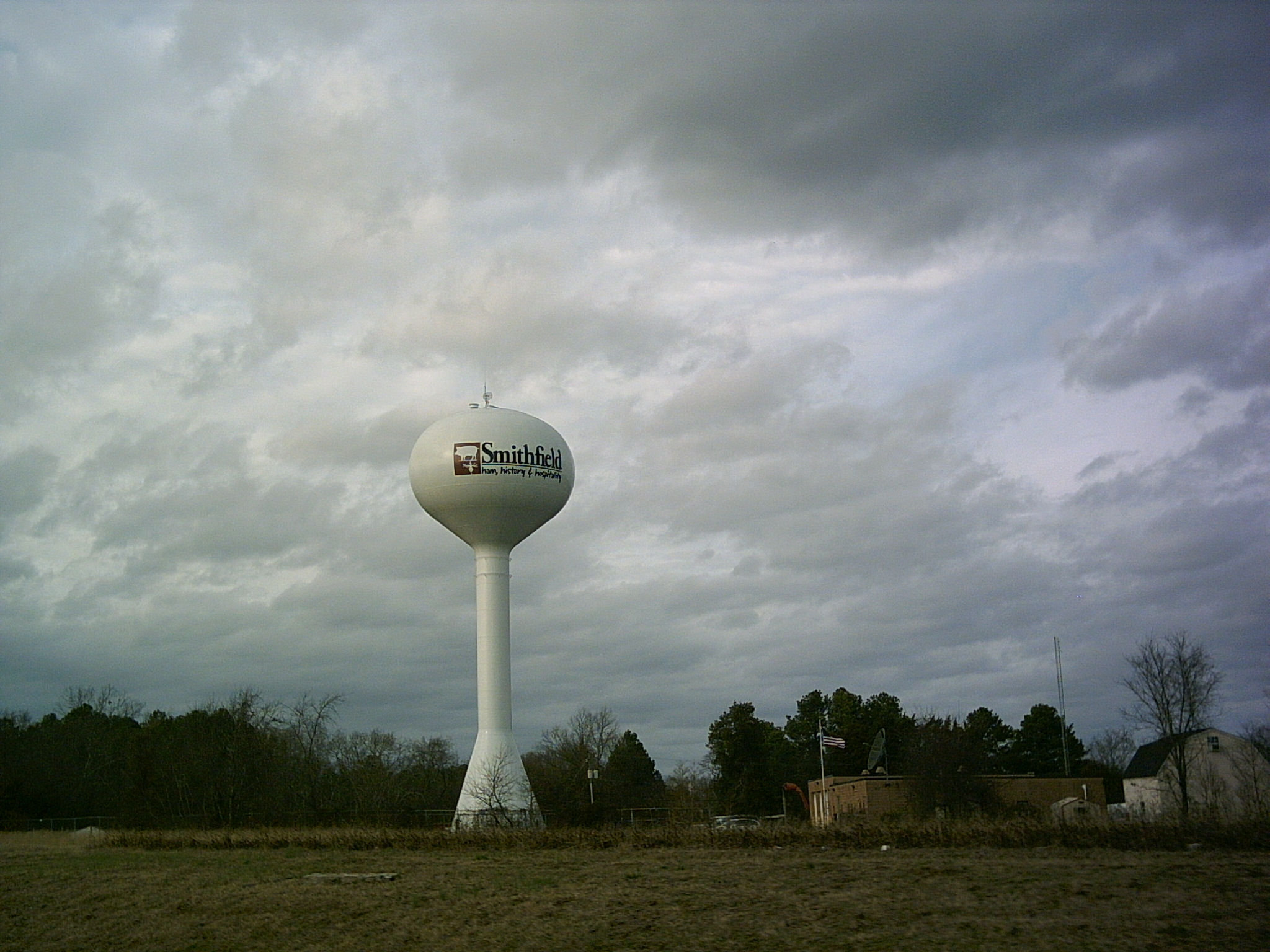
Water tower in Smithfield, displaying the motto of "ham, history & hospitality"

As of the census of 2010, there were 8,089 people, 2,438 households (2000 census), and 1,830 families residing in the town. The population density is 851.5 people per square mile (330.2/km^{2}). In 2000 there were 2,552 housing units at an average density of 267.9 per square mile (103.4/km^{2}). The racial makeup of the town was 67.22% White, 30.87% African American, 0.35% Native American, 0.41% Asian, 0.02% Pacific Islander, 0.22% from other races, and 0.92% from two or more races. Hispanic or Latino of any race were 0.93% of the population.

There were 2,438 households, out of which 37.1% had children under the age of 18 living with them, 53.2% were married couples living together, 17.8% had a female householder with no husband present, and 24.9% were non-families. 21.5% of all households were made up of individuals, and 9.7% had someone living alone who was 65 years of age or older. The average household size was 2.55 and the average family size was 2.95.

In the town, the population was spread out, with 27.0% under the age of 18, 7.0% from 18 to 24, 29.3% from 25 to 44, 23.1% from 45 to 64, and 13.6% who were 65 years of age or older. The median age was 38 years. For every 100 females, there were 89.3 males. For every 100 females aged 18 and over, there were 82.4 males.

The median income for a household in the town was $43,224, and the median income for a family was $53,906. Males had a median income of $40,845 versus $24,419 for females. The per capita income for the town was $19,301. About 11.8% of families and 12.0% of the population were below the poverty line, including 12.7% of those under the age of 18 and 15.6% of those 65 and older.

== Culture and architecture ==
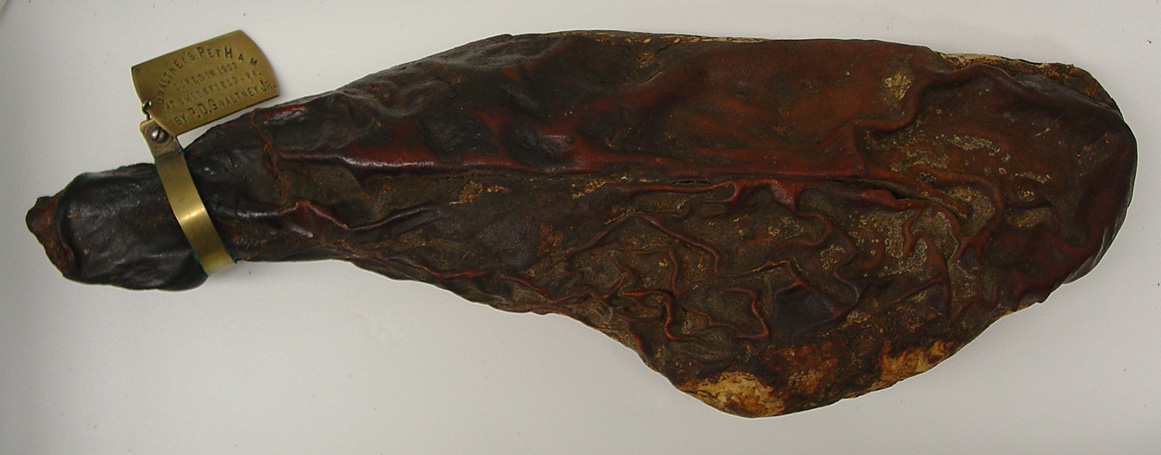
The Isle of Wight County Museum holds P.D. Gwaltney Jr.'s "pet ham". It is thought to be the world's oldest ham, having been cured in 1902.

Known as the ham capital of the world, Smithfield attracts many tourists. Smithfield's Historic District is a major attraction, with more than 70 contributing properties from the Colonial, Federal, and Victorian periods plus independent restaurants and shops. Historic buildings that lure tourists downtown include the Isle of Wight County Museum, The Smithfield Inn, the Schoolhouse Museum, the Old Courthouse of 1750, the Wentworth-Grinnan House, and The Mansion on Main which is now a bed & breakfast.

Outside of the historic district are St. Luke's Church, a National Historic Landmark, Historic Fort Huger, and Fort Boykin. Windsor Castle Park is within walking distance of downtown and includes trails, kayak rentals, a dog park, and the historic manor house which is now an event space.

Countryside attractions just outside Smithfield include Boykin's Tavern Museum, the 1800 Isle of Wight Courthouse, and Darden's Country Store, which still smokes ham for sale from their family-run farm. The free Jamestown/Scotland Ferry (located in Surry) allows tourists to visit Williamsburg, Virginia, as well, linking Smithfield to the historic triangle. Smithfield is a convenient day trip from Norfolk, Richmond, and Virginia Beach.

The Fort Boykin Archaeological Site (44IW20), Four Square, P. D. Gwaltney Jr. House, Ivy Hill Cemetery, Col. Josiah Parker Family Cemetery, Poplar Hill, Robert Tynes House, and Wolftrap Farm are listed on the National Register of Historic Places.

Smithfield offers an array of events throughout the year for locals and tourists alike. Annual events include Bacon & Bourbon Fest, BOB Fest and Wine & Beer Fest in Windsor Castle Park, Spring and Autumn Vintage Markets downtown, Mistletoe Market around the holidays, and Christmas/St. Patrick's Day Parades. During the summer, the Smithfield Farmers Market and Pickers Market (vintage/secondhand items) are on Saturdays. Smithfield Little Theater, a volunteer run community theatre, offers plays, musical and children's programs throughout the year.

Windsor Castle Park, Nike Park, Clontz Park, Cypress Creek Golf Course, and Smithfield Station Restaurant, Waterfront Inn & Marina are some recreational sites of Smithfield. Boating, fishing, hunting, and biking are enjoyed, and the city has a local skate park, trails, and two kayak launches.

== Gallery ==
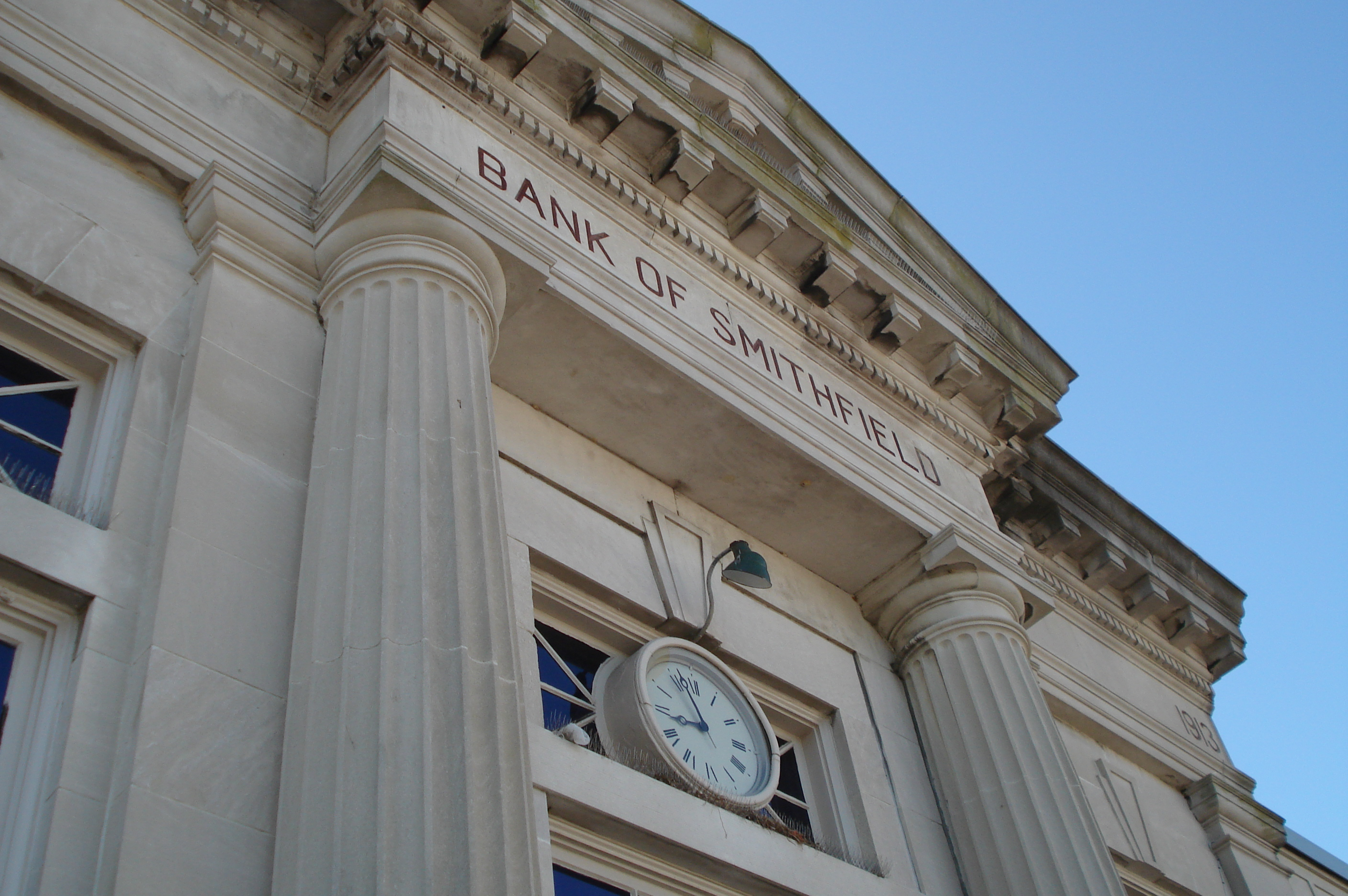
Isle of Wight County Museum

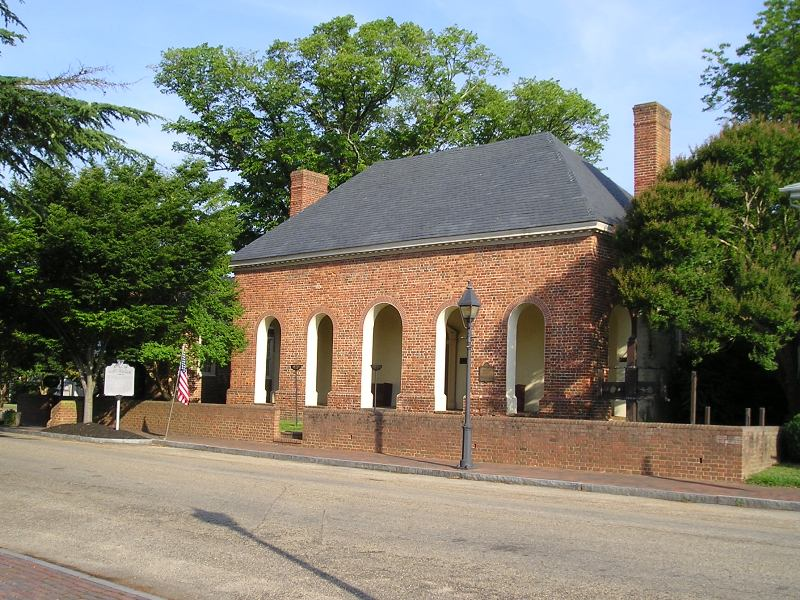
The colonial courthouse on Main Street.

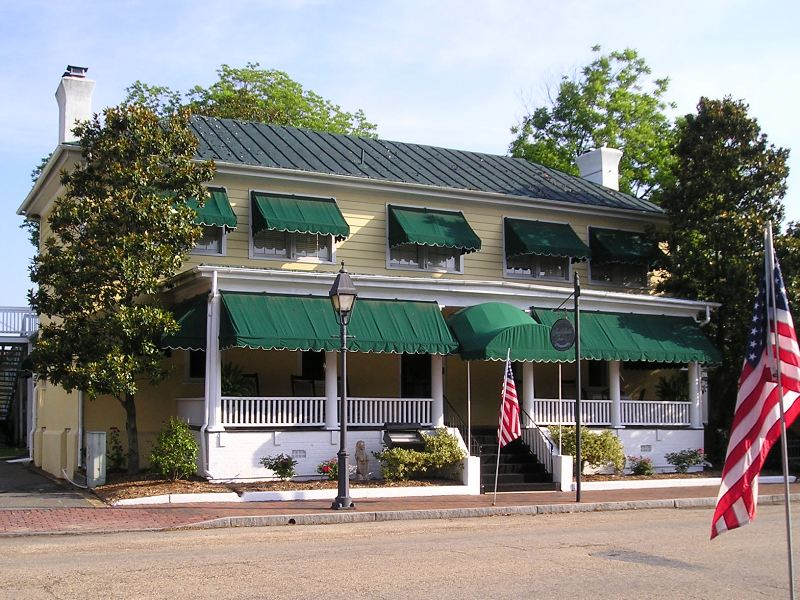
The colonial tavern on Main Street, now operated as the Smithfield Inn.

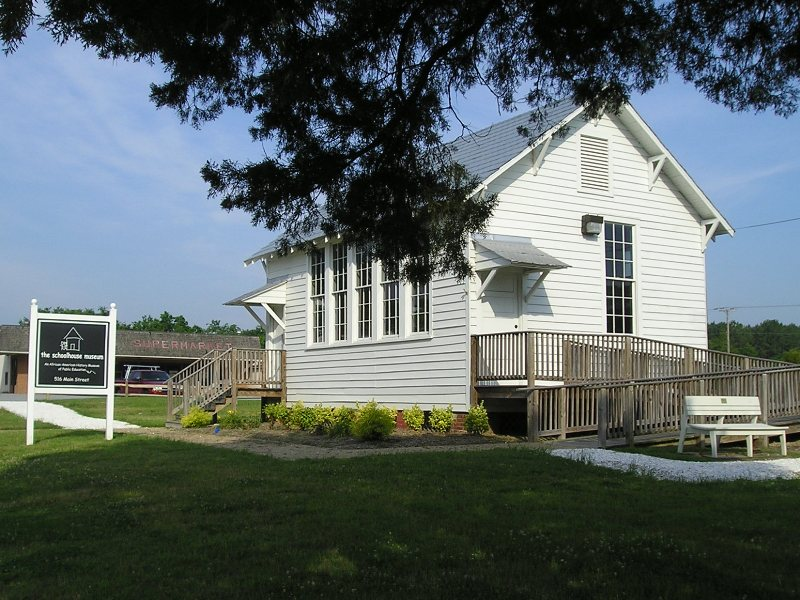
The Schoolhouse Museum on Main Street.

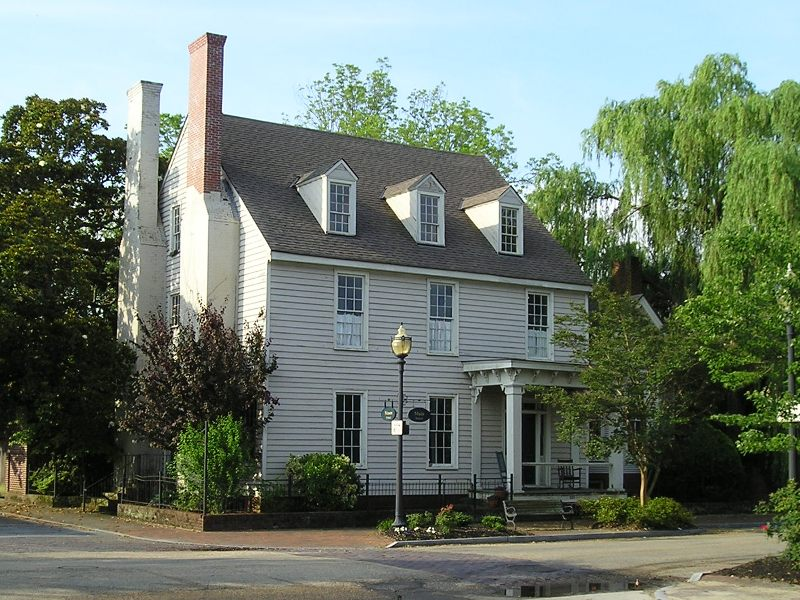
The Jordan House, a private residence on Main Street.

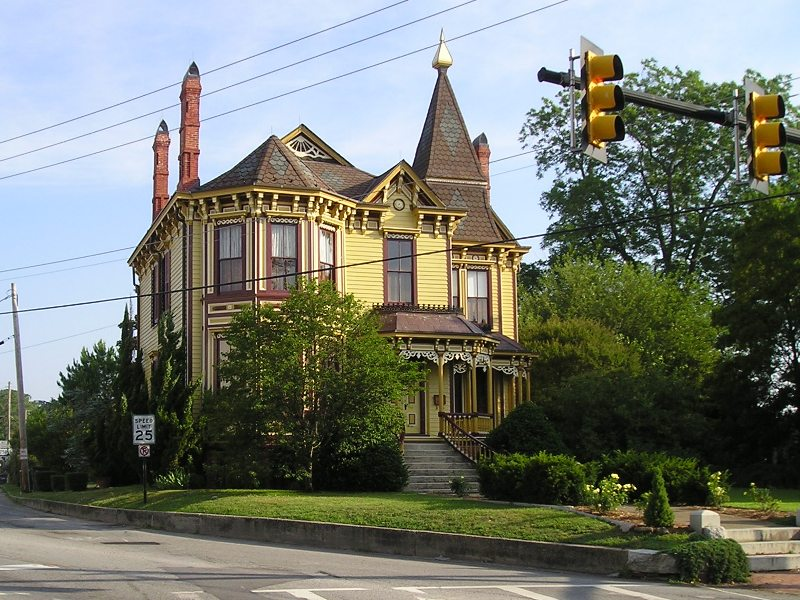
The Mansion on Main Street.

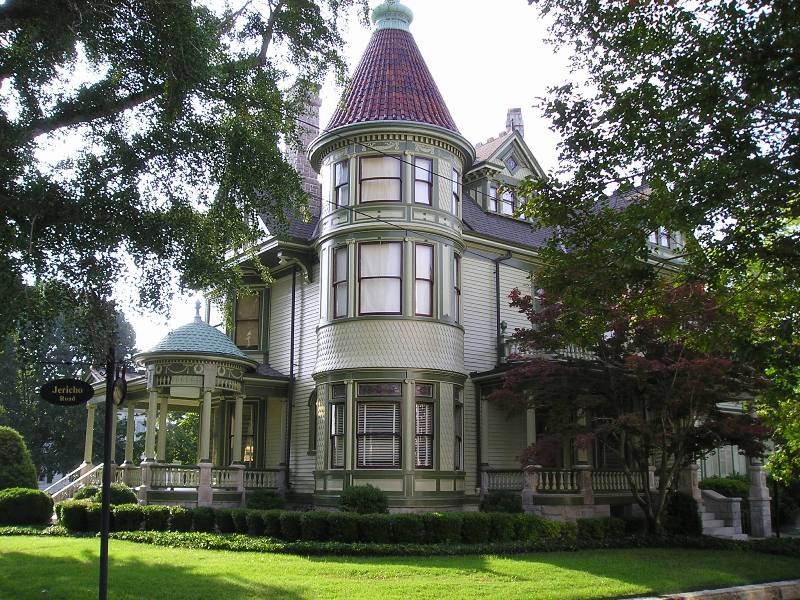
The Gwaltney House, a private residence on South Church Street.

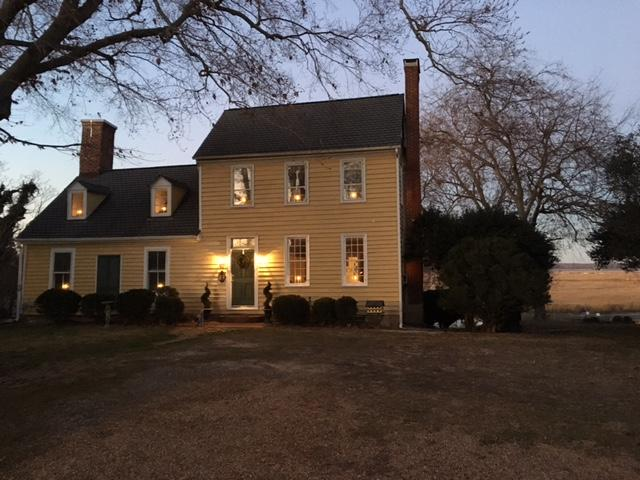
The Wentworth-Grinnan House overlooking the Pagan River and wetlands.

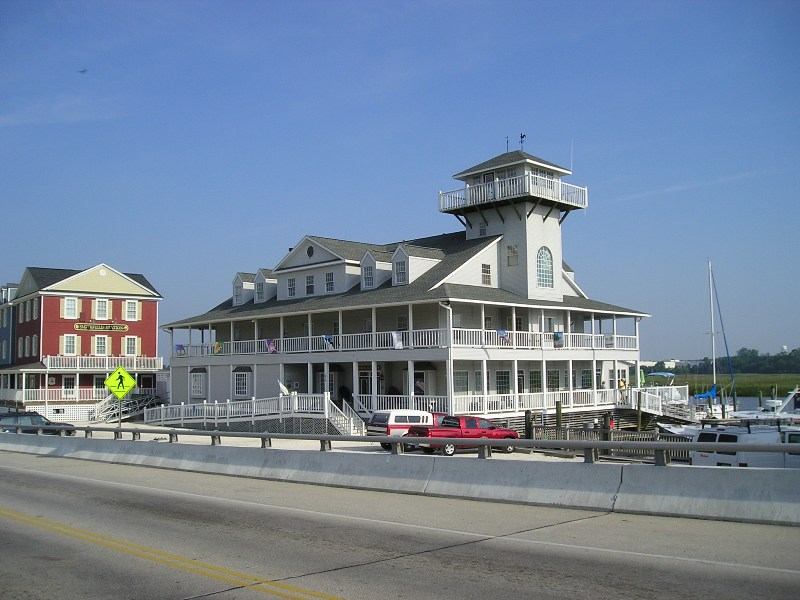
Smithfield Station hotel, restaurant, and marina.

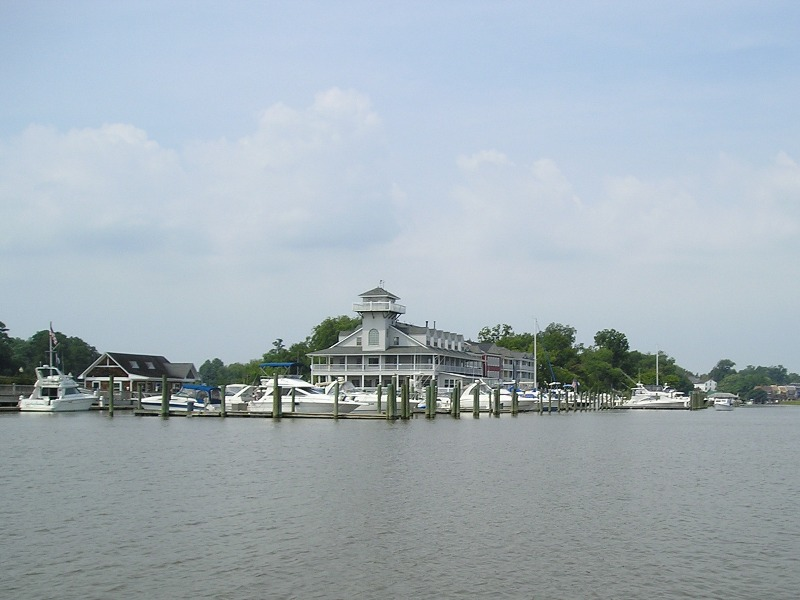
Smithfield Station viewed from the Pagan River.

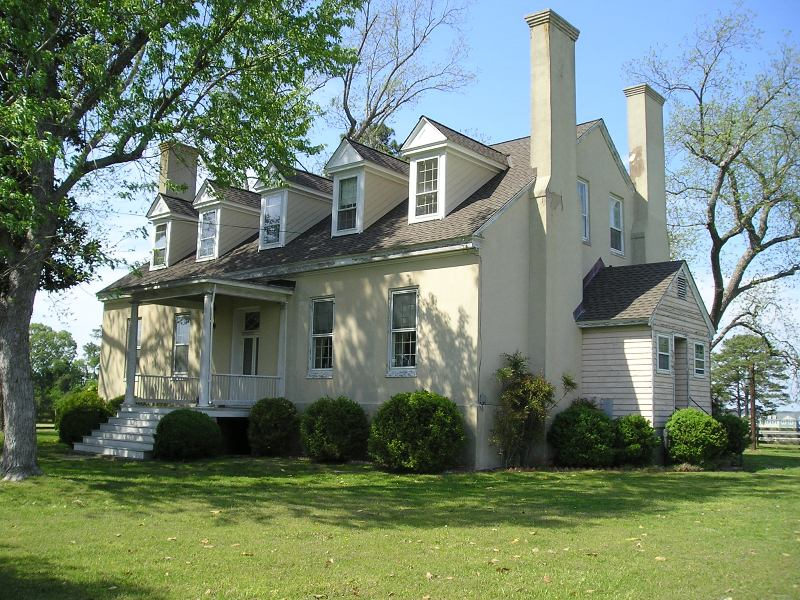
The manor house at Windsor Castle Park.

== Schools ==
- Carrollton Elementary School (PreK–3rd)
- Hardy Elementary School (PreK–4th)
- Westside Elementary School (4th–6th)
- Smithfield Middle School (7th–8th)
- Smithfield High School (9th–12th)

== In popular culture ==
- In the HBO Max original series And Just Like That... the character of Aidan Shaw (played by John Corbett) resides in Smithfield, VA with his sons.

== Notable people ==
- William K. Barlow (1936–2022) – Virginia state politician
- Mary Batten (b. 1937) – science writer
- Lewis C. Bidamon (1806–1891) – Illinois militia leader
- Brian Blount – Presbyterian minister, New Testament scholar and former president of the Union Presbyterian Seminary
- Robert Butler (1784–1853) – Virginia state adjutant general and state treasurer
- Cynthia Clarey (b. 1949) – operatic singer and educator
- Cliff Daniels (b. 1988) – NASCAR crew chief
- Aaron De Groft (b. 1966) – museum director, author, and art curator
- Cassie Donegan (b. 1997) – Miss America 2026
- Willie Drew (b. 2000) – professional football player
- Ernest A. Finney Jr. (1931–2017) – Chief Justice of South Carolina
- Robert H. Hodsden (1806–1864) – Tennessee state politician
- Joseph W. Luter III (b. 1939) – chairman of Smithfield Foods
- Otelia B. Mahone (1835–1911) – nurse during the American Civil War and wife of Confederate Major General William Mahone
- Parke S. Rouse Jr. (1915–1995) – journalist, writer, and historian
- Arthur Smith (1785–1853) – U.S. Representative for Virginia
- Arthur Smith IV (1680–1755) – British colonial landowner, politician, and captain who incorporated Smithfield
- Allie Edward Stakes Stephens (1900–1973) – Lieutenant Governor of Virginia
- Chris Taliaferro (b. 1965) – Chicago City Council member
- F. Palmer Weber (1914–1986) – activist and politician

== See also ==
- Warrosquyoake Shire
- Isle of Wight County
