= Cypress Creek (Pagan River tributary) =

Tributary of the Pagan River

Coordinates: 36°58′56″N 76°37′15″W

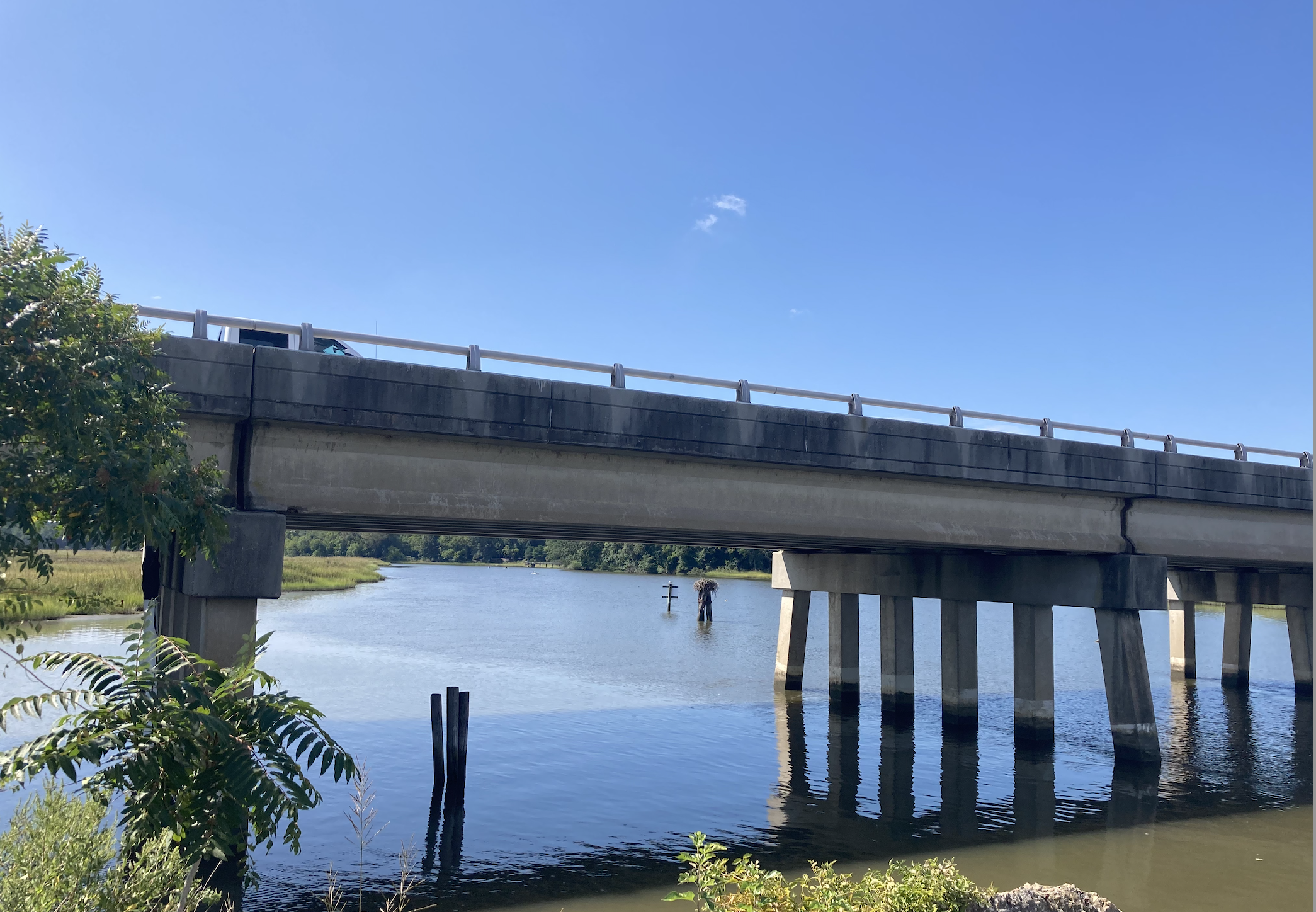
Cypress Creek meets the Pagan River at US-10 BYP Bridge

Cypress Creek is a major tributary of the Pagan River located in Isle of Wight County, Virginia. The tidal waterway flows northward from where it rises from the forested swamps of Great Springs road before merging with the Pagan River near the town of Smithfield. Salt marshes surrounding the creek provide natural habitat for abundant wide life including the great blue heron, egrets, osprey, belted kingfisher and many other bird species.

Windsor Castle Park a 208 acre public park and former plantation, located in the town of Smithfield sits on the banks of Cypress Creek. Visitors to the historical site explore scenic trails, bird watch, enjoy panoramic views of the riverside before kayaking and canoeing from Windsor Castle park launches.

== Watershed and course ==
The tributary is a meandering 8-mile long(12.87 km) tidal creek originating in the rural cypress swamps of Longview near Benns Church. This non-tidal wetland known as Champion Swamp is a main tributary of Cypress Creek. The creek is part of the larger Pagan River System, comprising the river Pagan and main tributaries Cypress Creek and Jones Creek along with numerous smaller tributaries. The total water area of the Pagan River System is approximately 2,500 acres according to a 1988 government study.

It reaches a depth between 1–5 feet (MLW), COE project depth of 4–6 feet (MLW) dredged channels.

The mean lunar tide range at Smithfield is 2.8 feet. Surges from strong easterly winds may augment lunar tides and cause local flooding. There are no significant fetches within the system and surface waters are not significantly affected by wind conditions.

Pagan River System's immediate shoreline characteristics are embayed and extensive marsh. There are also small sections of shoreline consisting of fringe marsh or artificially stabilized (bulkheads). The predominant upland use is agriculture. Other uses include, in order of predominance: unmanaged woodland, residential(Battery Park, Moonfield, Pagan Point, Pinewood Heights and newer development), commercial (commercial marinas, commercial docks, and businesses along the north and east side of Church Street between the Cypress Creek Bridge and the Pagan River Bridge), industrial(Smithfield Packing Company and Gwaltney of Smithfield plants), and recreational (Carrollton Nike Park and newer development).

Shoreline vegetation consists primarily of marsh grasses. The marsh habitat supports a variety of wading birds, migratory waterfowl and fur bearing mammals (muskrat and nutria). The waters of the Pagan River System support a diversity of marine and, in upstream areas, brackish water, finfish. Shellfish, especially oysters and blue crabs, were also in abundance at the time of the 1988 government report.

Recreational activities along the creek include fishing (boat, shore and pier), power boating, canoeing, hunting and wildlife observation.

A popular 9.2 mile (7.4 km) out-and-back river trail used for kayaking and paddle sports extends from Cypress Creek to Champion swamp.

The river crosses beneath Route 10 Bypass Bridge where the riverbank becomes a brackish mix of marsh and wooded shoreline.
