= Giles Jones =

1600s Virginia planter

Giles Jones was a Virginia planter who claimed land along the Pagan River before 1618. During this period, the river and the county were named Warraskoyak, one of two original shires named after the natives who resided there along the river.

Jones Creek, a tidal stream located in Rescue, Virginia, is named after him.
