= WGBS-LD =

Television station in Carrollton, Virginia

- Carrollton, Virginia; United States
- Channels: Digital: 12 (VHF); Virtual: 7
- Branding: WGBS-TV 7

Programming
- Affiliations: 7.1: Infomercials; 7.2: Color bars

Ownership
- Owner: Joan Wright; (Joan and Kenneth Wright)

History
- First air date: March 1994
- Former call signs: W07CZ (1993–1996); WGBS-LP (1996–2009)
- Former channel numbers: Analog: 7 (VHF, 1994–2009); Digital: 11 (VHF, 2009–2022)
- Former affiliations: AIN, Retro TV

Technical information
- Licensing authority: FCC
- Facility ID: 31350
- Class: LD
- ERP: 2.7 kW
- HAAT: 116 m (381 ft)
- Transmitter coordinates: 36°51′39.1″N 76°21′9.6″W

Links
- Public license information: LMS

WGBS-LD (channel 7) is a low-power television station licensed to Carrollton, Virginia, United States, serving the Hampton Roads area and primarily airing paid programming. The station is owned by Joan Wright.

The station began broadcasting in March 1994. For most of the 1990s, the station was a low-power independent outlet known as "Genesis TV7", mixing programs from the American Independent Network with local programs, some of them Christian, such as Morning Praise, Peninsula SportsCenter, and a community bulletin board. It originally broadcast from the former studio of WVEC in Hampton; the signal was broadcast from its former tower. In 1996, the station moved its studio to the Newmarket Fair shopping mall.

In 1998, Cox Communications removed WGBS-LP from its lineup in Hampton as part of a move to consolidate lineups in different Hampton Roads municipalities. The removal forced Genesis TV7 to lay off 10 employees and scale back its local programming.

The founders, Kenneth and Joan Wright, separated in 2017. In 2020, they signed an agreement whereby Kenneth transferred all of his interest in WGBS-LD to Joan Wright.

== Subchannels ==
The station's signal is multiplexed:

Subchannels of WGBS-LD
Subchannel	Res.	Short name	Programming
7.1	480i	WGBS-LD	Infomercials (4:3)
7.2	480i	WGBS-LD	Color bars
