= Blackwater Regional Library =

- Location: US
- Established: 1958

Other information
- Website: Blackwater Regional Library

Blackwater Regional Library system serves the counties of Isle of Wight, Southampton, Surry, Sussex, and the city of Franklin in Virginia. The library system is within Region 3 of Virginia Library Association (VLA). According to FY 2015 Statistical Data for Virginia Public Libraries, the Blackwater Regional Library serves a population of 82,763.

== Service area ==
According to the FY 2014 Institute of Museum and Library Services Data Catalog, the Blackwater Regional Library System has a service area population of 81,876 with 1 central library and 8 branch libraries.

== History ==
Southampton citizens Walter Cecil Rawls and his friend Junious W. Pulley planned what would become the Walter Cecil Rawls Library and Museum, which is the first of what would become the currently nine-branch Blackwater Regional Library. The Walter Cecil Rawls Library and Museum opened for public use on June 13, 1958. Rawls implemented a bookmobile service in 1959 on the second week in April during National Library Week. The bookmobile routes eventually led to the opening of the branches in the other counties.

== Branches ==
- Carrollton Branch (Carrollton) established 1984.
- Claremont Branch (Claremont) established 1980.
- Courtland Branch/ Walter Cecil Rawls Library (Courtland)
- Franklin Branch/ Ruth Camp Campbell Memorial Library (Franklin) – established 1926.
- Smithfield Branch (Smithfield) – established 1924.
- Surry Branch (Surry) – established 1984.
- Wakefield Branch/ Troxler Memorial Library (Wakefield)
- Waverly Branch/ Agnes Taylor Gray Library (Waverly)
- Windsor Branch (Windsor) – established 1995.
