= Litigation related to Smithfield Foods =

Smithfield Foods has been sued multiple times related to the disposal of hog waste using anaerobic lagoons. State governments have responded to the suits against Smithfield and similar litigation by strengthening ”Right-to-Farm” laws.

== Multiple Lawsuits ==
=== North Carolina ===
About 500 plaintiffs in 29 cases have sued Smithfield Foods through its subsidiary Murphy-Brown alleging harm from odors and insects associated with anaerobic lagoons. As of July 2019, a federal judge required the two sides to take turns picking cases to establish a typical case value for use in a negotiated settlement.

In April 2018, a jury in federal court awarded ten plaintiffs who lived close to a hog farm, Kinlaw Farms in Bladen County, with 15,000 animals a total of $750,000 in compensatory damages and $50 million in punitive damages. The award for punitive damages was adjusted downward as mandated by North Carolina law that caps punitive damages at a level equal to three times the award for compensatory damages, or $250,000, whichever is greater. Under this law total damages were reduced to $3.25 million.

In July 2018, two plaintiffs, who were neighbors of a Smithfield operation in Duplin County, were awarded a $25 million verdict.

Immediately after this verdict, 1,000 to 1,600 people attended a rally on a Duplin County farm to support farmers in their struggle against nuisance suits. North Carolina's lieutenant governor, speaker of the house, agriculture commissioner, and a state legislator attended.

In December 2018, eight plaintiffs who live near a contract farm in Sampson County won a verdict against Smithfield Foods. Four plaintiffs received $100 in compensatory damages. Two won $1,000 in compensatory damages. One received $25,000 in compensatory damages. One elderly female plaintiff who lived close to the farm and grew up nearby was awarded $75,000 in compensatory damages. A judge ruled that the plaintiffs did not provide enough evidence to justify the award of punitive damages. Before and during the trial, many residents of the area planted yard signs that read, "Stand for hog farmers."

Farm trade groups and sympathetic politicians have openly complained that these suits endanger their industry. In 2018 North Carolina changed its right-to-farm law to further protect farmers from frivolous lawsuits. The language of the law was substantially altered to more narrowly and clearly define what qualifies as a nuisance while limiting when plaintiffs may be awarded punitive damages.

United States District Court Judge Earl Britt lifted his gag order on September 3, 2018.

The jurors were not allowed to visit the farms in question or the areas around them in all of these cases.

The cases presided over by Judge Earl Britt have ended with different verdicts than those heard by Judge David Faber.

==== Bifurcation of compensatory and punitive damages ====
Smithfield moved to bifurcate the issues of its liability for compensatory damages and its liability for punitive damages. This motion was granted on October 24, 2018, by Senior United States District Judge David A. Faber. Research shows that bifurcating trials in this manner creates more uniform verdicts for compensatory damages and decreased the chance of juries awarding extremely high judgments for compensatory damages. Bifurcation also results in lower awards for compensatory damages in cases of involving minor or less severe injuries while resulting in higher awards for in cases where injuries are severe. Jurors report they feel they use evidence more appropriately in bifurcated trials.

As of September 24, 2019, jurors in the cases mentioned above have awarded a total of $549,772,400 in damages. These damages have been reduced to $97.9 million in accordance with North Carolina's laws limiting punitive damages.

=== Legislation ===
The state legislature passed the North Carolina Farm Act of 2018 to help reduce the exposure of farmers to unreasonable litigation and high punitive damage awards. Governor Roy Cooper vetoed the act, but the legislature overrode his veto. The new law does not apply to lawsuits that have already been filed.

=== Virginia ===
In February 1978, Virginia's State Water Control Board sought civil penalties against Smithfield for failing to make improvements to mitigate wastewater discharge into the Pagan River in a timely manner. In June of that year, the state attorney general accepted an out-of-court settlement that included a $25,000 payment.

In 1985, a federal judge in Richmond fined a Smithfield subsidiary about $1.2 million in a Clean Water Act suit filed by the Chesapeake Bay Foundation and the Natural Resources Defense Council.

== Labor disputes ==
The Smithfield Packing plant in Tar Heel, North Carolina, was the site of a 15-year dispute between the company and the United Food and Commercial Workers Union, which had tried since the early 1990s to organize the plant's roughly 5,000 hourly workers.

After demonstrations, lockouts, and a shareholder meeting that was disrupted by shareholders supporting the union, the union called for a boycott of Smithfield products. In 2007, Smithfield countered by filing a federal racketeering lawsuit against the union. The following year Smithfield and the union reached an agreement, under which the union agreed to suspend its boycott in return for the company dropping its racketeering case and allowing another election. In December 2008, workers voted 2,041 to 1,879 in favor of joining the union.
