= Jones Creek (Pagan River tributary) =

Tributary of the Pagan River

Coordinates: 36°59′56″N 76°34′11″W

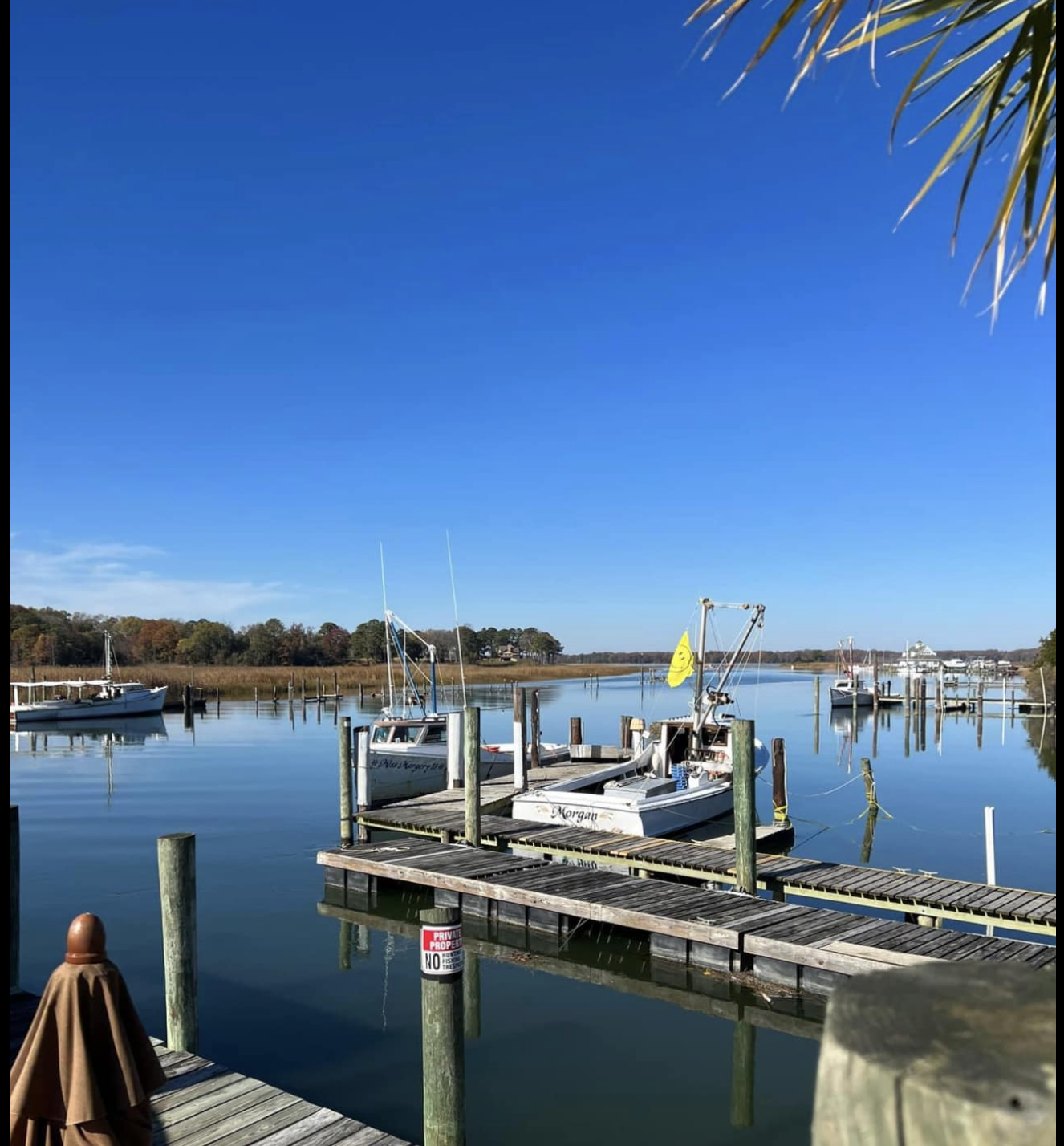
Jones Creek from Chuck-a-Muck boat pier in Rescue, Virginia

Jones Creek is a major tributary of the Pagan River. The 7-mile long (11.27km) tidal stream is located along the coastal village of Rescue, Virginia, 4 miles (6.44km) east-northeast of the colonial seaport town of Smithfield, Virginia. The tidal creek is part of the larger Pagan River System comprising, the river Pagan, main tributaries Jones Creek and Cypress Creek along with numerous smaller tributaries, including Titus Creek, Town Farm Creek and Carrollton Branch Creek which are tributaries of Jones Creek . The total water area of the main system is approximately 2,500 acres. It reaches a depth of 1-5 feet (MLW), COE project depth of 4-6 feet (MLW) dredged channels.

The tributary creek conjoins the larger Pagan River at the convergence of the James River along the southeastern shores of Isle of Wight County, Virginia, south of Newport News, Virginia.

== History ==
The creek is named after Virginia planter and settler Giles Jones who claimed land along the Pagan River before 1618. The Pagan River and the county were known as Warraskoyak during this Late Woodland period. Later the county was renamed Isle of Wight County eponymously after the island in England named Isle of Wight and the Warraskoyak River became known as the Pagan River.
