= Carrollton, Virginia =

- Census-designated place
- Location within Virginia Location within the United States
- Coordinates: 36°56′1″N 76°31′38″W
- Country: United States
- State: Virginia
- County: Isle of Wight

Area
  - Total: 5.8 sq mi (15.0 km^{2})
  - Land: 5.7 sq mi (14.8 km^{2})
  - Water: 0.077 sq mi (0.2 km^{2})
- Elevation: 22 ft (6.7 m)

Population (2020)
  - Total: 7,498
  - Density: 925/sq mi (357.3/km^{2})
- Time zone: UTC−5 (Eastern (EST))
  - Summer (DST): UTC−4 (EDT)
- ZIP code: 23314
- FIPS code: 51-13160
- GNIS feature ID: 2584823

Carrollton is a census-designated place (CDP) in Isle of Wight County, Virginia, United States. The population as of the 2020 census was 7,498.

Carrollton is located near the southern end of the James River Bridge across from Newport News. Carrollton has recently experienced growth as a bedroom community.

== History ==
Carrollton is named for the Carroll family, prominent landowners of the 19th century. The remaining home of the Carroll family is located at the intersection of Reynolds Drive and Norsworthy Drive, and is considered to have been in deteriorating condition for many years. At one time the home also is said to have served as the Carrollton Country Store.

The Carroll home is one of only a handful of truly historic Carrollton homes. It predates the original Carrollton Post Office, which is now occupied by a locally owned heating business. The old post office is located about 300 feet (100 m) east of the Carroll home on Norsworthy Drive near the western end of the current CDP. Its flagpole still stands.

== Geography ==
The Carrollton CDP is in the eastern portion of Isle Wight County, occupying a swath of land west of the James River and southeast of Smithfield. It includes the unincorporated community of Bartlett. The southern border of the CDP is tidal Chuckatuck Creek, forming the border between Isle of Wight County and the independent city of Suffolk. The eastern border of the CDP follows Winall Creek north from Chuckatuck Creek, then Newbill Lane and State Route 661, then extends east to tidal Ragged Island Creek. The border runs north up the creek to U.S. Route 17, then follows State Routes 659 and 712 (Vellines Lane) west to State Route 665 (Smiths Neck Road). The border continues southwest on Route 665, which becomes Reynolds Drive, running to an unnamed creek near Woolard Lane. The border follows the creek south to U.S. Route 258, which it follows east back to US-17 at Bartlett, then turns south on US-17 to Deep Bottom Drive. The border then runs south to Creer Creek, continuing south (downstream) to Brewers Creek, which it follows southeast back to Chuckatuck Creek.

According to the U.S. Census Bureau, the Carrollton CDP has a total area of 5.8 square miles (15.0 km^{2}), of which 5.7 square miles (14.8 km^{2}) are land and 0.1 square miles (0.2 km^{2}), or 1.48%, are water.

The Carrollton ZIP code area extends outside the CDP east as far as the James River and the border with Newport News, southeast to the border with the city of Suffolk, west to the area of Benns Church, and northwest to Jones Creek near Smithfield. The Carrollton post office lies about one mile southeast of the intersection of Carrollton Boulevard and Brewer's Neck Boulevard (U.S. Routes 17 and 258 and State Route 32), along Carrollton Boulevard (US-17). Carrollton does not include the communities of Battery Park or Rescue.

Carrollton has a humid subtropical climate (Cfa) and average monthly temperatures range from 40.4 °F in January to 80.0 °F in July. The local hardiness zone is 8a.

== Demographics ==
Historical population
| Census | Pop. | Note | %± |
|---|---|---|---|
| 2010 | 4,574 | | — |
| 2020 | 7,498 | | 63.9% |
U.S. Decennial Census; 2010 2020

Carrolltown was first listed as a census designated place in the 2010 U.S. census.

=== Racial and ethnic composition ===
Carrollton CDP, Virginia – Racial and ethnic composition Note: the US Census treats Hispanic/Latino as an ethnic category. This table excludes Latinos from the racial categories and assigns them to a separate category. Hispanics/Latinos may be of any race.
| Race / Ethnicity (NH = Non-Hispanic) | Pop 2010 | Pop 2020 | % 2010 | % 2020 |
|---|---|---|---|---|
| White alone (NH) | 3,307 | 4,856 | 72.30% | 64.76% |
| Black or African American alone (NH) | 911 | 1,641 | 19.92% | 21.89% |
| Native American or Alaska Native alone (NH) | 16 | 23 | 0.35% | 0.31% |
| Asian alone (NH) | 78 | 137 | 1.71% | 1.83% |
| Native Hawaiian or Pacific Islander alone (NH) | 2 | 6 | 0.04% | 0.08% |
| Other race alone (NH) | 12 | 44 | 0.26% | 0.59% |
| Mixed race or Multiracial (NH) | 100 | 407 | 2.19% | 5.43% |
| Hispanic or Latino (any race) | 148 | 384 | 3.24% | 5.12% |
| Total | 4,574 | 7,498 | 100.00% | 100.00% |

== Current growth ==
Carrollton has seen significant growth in the last decade, including developments like condominiums, new hospitals, schools, several restaurants, and new houses.

Several residential communities have been developed since 2001, with homes having starting prices above $250,000 and some as high as $900,000. Condominiums adjoin these communities, as well as luxury apartments. Some of these are not newly approved, as the Eagle Harbor subdivision was originally approved in the 1970s by the county's Board of Supervisors, though development plans lay dormant until around 2000. Fire, Rescue, and EMS services are provided by the Carrollton Volunteer Fire Department.

Carrollton is one of the two largest voting districts in Isle of Wight County, the other being Smithfield. The Route 17 James River Bridge carries in excess of 30,000 vehicles per day through Carrollton, many of which carry commuters to and from Newport News Shipbuilding.
