= Thomas Washer =

English settler and politician in Virginia

Ensign Thomas Washer
- Born: fl. 1600; Kingdom of England
- Died: Colony of Virginia
- Other name: Ensign Wisher
- Occupations: Planter, Burgess, Militia Officer
- Years active: 1619
- Children: Margaret (Polly) Washer

Member Virginia House of Burgesses
- In office 1619–1619

Military service
- Rank: Ensign

Ensign Thomas Washer was an early Virginia colonist who settled in the area that became Isle of Wight County, Virginia. Washer and Christopher Lawne represented Lawne's Plantation — thereafter known as Isle of Wight Plantation — as burgesses in the first assembly of the Virginia House of Burgesses, the lower house of the colonial Virginia General Assembly, in 1619.

== Life ==
Thomas was born to Blanche Carmarden and the Reverend William Washer, the latter of Upminster, Essex.

Before 1619, Ensign Washer, Captain Nathaniel Basse, and Giles Jones received patents for land along the Pagan River. Captain Christopher Lawne also settled in the same vicinity. Although the area was known as Captain Lawne's Plantation and its representatives were listed as representatives from the plantation, the colonists had also named the area "Warrosquyoake Shire" after the Native American tribe who lived there. Washer and Christopher Lawne represented Lawne's Plantation in the first assembly of the Virginia House of Burgesses in 1619.

The Indian Massacre of 1622 decimated the colony, including Warrosquyoake Shire, and began a series of retaliatory skirmishes that led to great loss of life on both sides. In 1620, a movement began to change the name of "Warresqueak County" to "Isle of Wight County" after the island in the English Channel, which was eventually done in 1637.

The Daughters of the American Revolution state that Ensign Washer had a daughter named Margaret (Polly). Little if anything more is known about Ensign Washer or what may have become of him.

== Legacy ==
Washer's name features on the monument to the first House of Burgesses, which was also the first representative assembly in English North America, located in Jamestown and dedicated by the Association for the Preservation of Virginia Antiquities in 1907.

== See also ==
- List of members of the Virginia House of Burgesses
