= Virginia State Route 52 =

The following highways in Virginia have been known as State Route 52:

- State Route 52 (Virginia 1928-1933), now part of U.S. Route 460
- State Route 52 (Virginia 1933), 1933 - mid-1930s, now part of State Route 32
- U.S. Route 52 (Virginia), by 1934 - present
