= Isle of Wight Training School =

Segregated public school in Isle of Wight, Virginia for black children

Coordinates: 36°58′31″N 76°38′59″W

Location
- Isle of Wight, Virginia; U.S.

Information
- Type: Public

The Isle of Wight Training School was a public secondary school in Isle of Wight, Virginia from 1928 until 1968. It served as the high school for black students until the public schools were integrated in 1968. The buildings were repurposed as Smithfield Elementary School.

== History ==
In the late 19th century, there were many small negro schools in the Isle of Wight area. In 1924, the school board agreed they would provide teachers and supplies for a black school, provided that the black community would collect donations for property and a schoolhouse. In 1928, the Isle of Wight Training School opened in an eight room brick building on seven acres of land, replacing the Riverview negro school. By 1940, the school had reached an enrollment of 165. It was renamed Westside High School in 1960. In 1969, the schools were integrated with the white school, the high school-age student body was transferred to Smithfield High School, and the building became Smithfield Elementary School. Only two of the black teachers were accepted to teach at Smithfield High School. The current building is now named Westside Elementary School since 2005 and serves grades 4th-6th.

== Athletics ==
Westside won the state championship in football in 1966.
