= Battery Park, Virginia =

Unincorporated community in Virginia, United States

- Unincorporated community
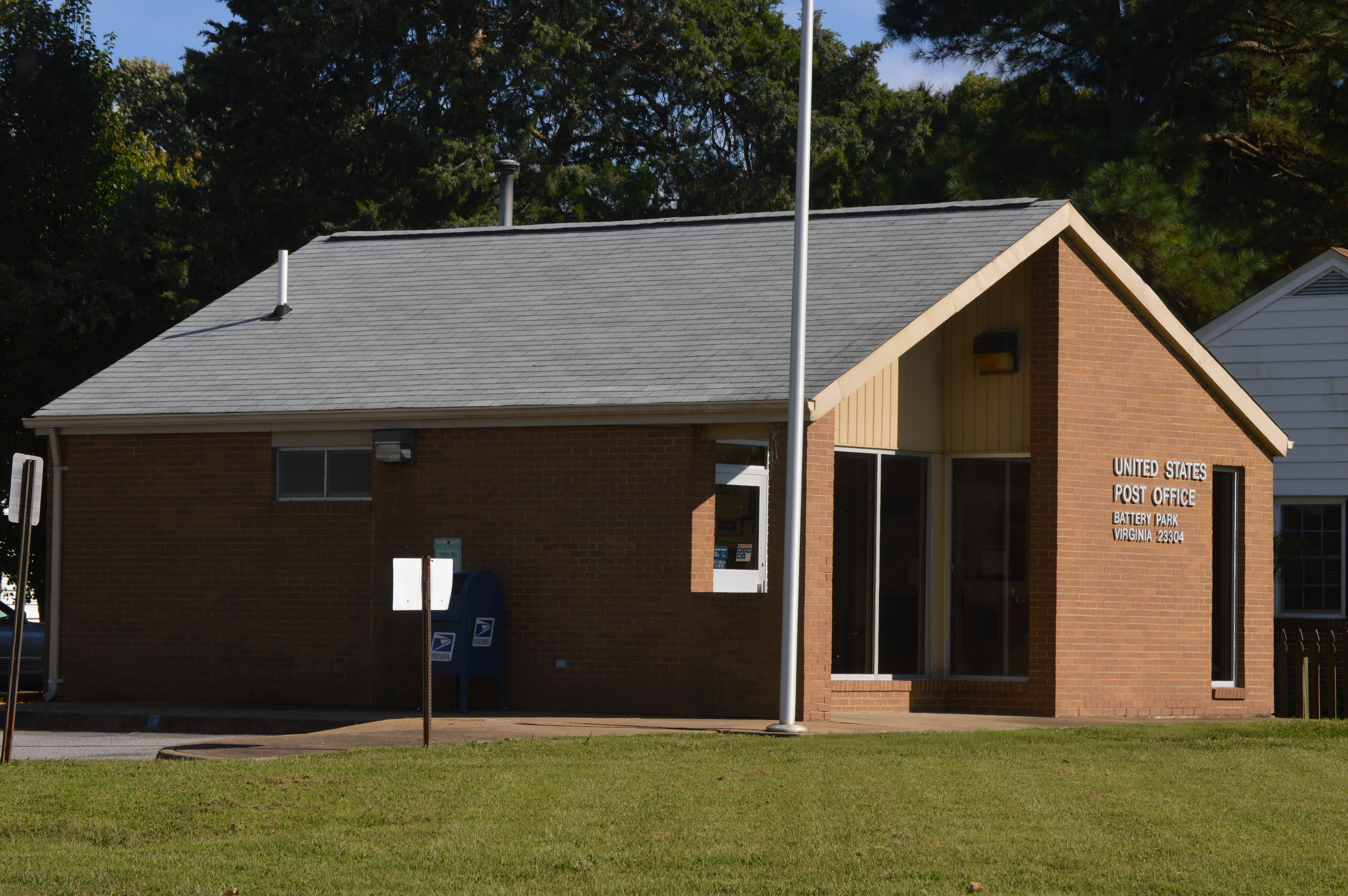
- Post office

- Location within Virginia Location within the United States
- Coordinates: 36°59′48″N 76°34′27″W
- Country: United States
- State: Virginia
- County: Isle of Wight
- Elevation: 20 ft (6.1 m)
- Time zone: UTC-5 (Eastern (EST))
  - Summer (DST): UTC-4 (EDT)
- ZIP code: 23304
- Area codes: 757, 948
- GNIS feature ID: 1492523

Battery Park is an unincorporated community in Isle of Wight County, Virginia, United States. Battery Park is located near the confluence of the Pagan River into the James River, 3.3 miles (5.3 km) east-northeast of Smithfield. Battery Park has a post office with ZIP code 23304, which opened on December 28, 1892.
