= Walters, Virginia =

Unincorporated community in Virginia, United States

Coordinates: 36°46′21″N 76°50′58″W

Walters is an unincorporated community in Isle of Wight County in the Hampton Roads region of southeastern Virginia, United States. The elevation is 56 feet (17 m).

Walters was located on a now-abandoned portion of the Virginian Railway (VGN), built by industrialist Henry Huttleston Rogers to ship coal from West Virginia to port at Sewell's Point, near Norfolk. Completed in 1909, the VGN was merged into the Norfolk and Western Railway in 1959. The former railroad right-of-way now carries an important pipeline which transports fresh water to communities in South Hampton Roads.

Walters was named after a resident, Walter Joyner. A nearby community in Southampton County was already named Joyners, so that name was abandoned. The community at one time was a bustling area, with several stores, a bank and post office. However, it is still home to some local businesses, including one that sells lawn and garden equipment, golf carts, and lawn tractors.
