= Christopher Lawne =

English merchant and Puritan (fl. 1590)

Captain Christopher Lawne
- Born: c. 1590; Blandford, Dorset, England
- Died: November 1619; Colony of Virginia
- Occupation: Merchant
- Known for: English Dissenter, Namesake of Lawne's Creek, Virginia
- Notable work: "The prophane schisme of the Brownists or Separatists, etc" (1612) "Brownisme turned the in-side out-ward..." (1613)

Christopher Lawne (fl. 1590) was an English merchant and Puritan of note, who was among the earliest settlers in the Virginia Colony in the early 17th century. Born in Blandford, Dorset, he emigrated on his ship, the Marigold (or Mary Gold) in May 1618, and died in Virginia the following year.

Lawne established "Captain Lawne's Plantation" with 15-20 other Puritan colonists, including Ensign Thomas Washer. Lawne's Creek, on the south bank of the James in present-day Isle of Wight County, is named for Christopher Lawne. Lawne sat as a burgess in Governor George Yeardley's First General Assembly of the Virginia House of Burgesses. Soon thereafter, Lawne fell ill and died that November. His will was witnessed by Nathaniel West (younger brother of Thomas West, Lord De La Warr), and surgeon Pharao Flynton.

Like many English Dissenters, Lawne initially left England for the Netherlands, drawn by its greater religious tolerance. He was an Elder among the Ancient Brethren of Francis Johnson's church. However, he eventually grew disenchanted with the often-fractious sect, and eventually returned to London. There he had published The prophane schisme of the Brownists or Separatists With the impietie, dissensions, lewd, and abhominable vices of that impure sect: Discovered by Christopher Lawne, John Fowler, Clement Saunders, Robert Bulward; lately returned from the Company of Master Johnson, that wicked Brother, into the bosom of the Church of England, their true Mother in 1612 and Brownism turned the inside outward: Being a Parallel between the Profession and the Practice of the Brownists' religion. By Christopher Lawne, lately returned from that wicked Separation London, 1613.

He may have been influenced in his writings by the Rev. John Paget of Nantwich, Cheshire, first minister of the English Reformed Church in Amsterdam.
