= Willie Drew =

American gridiron football player (born 2000)

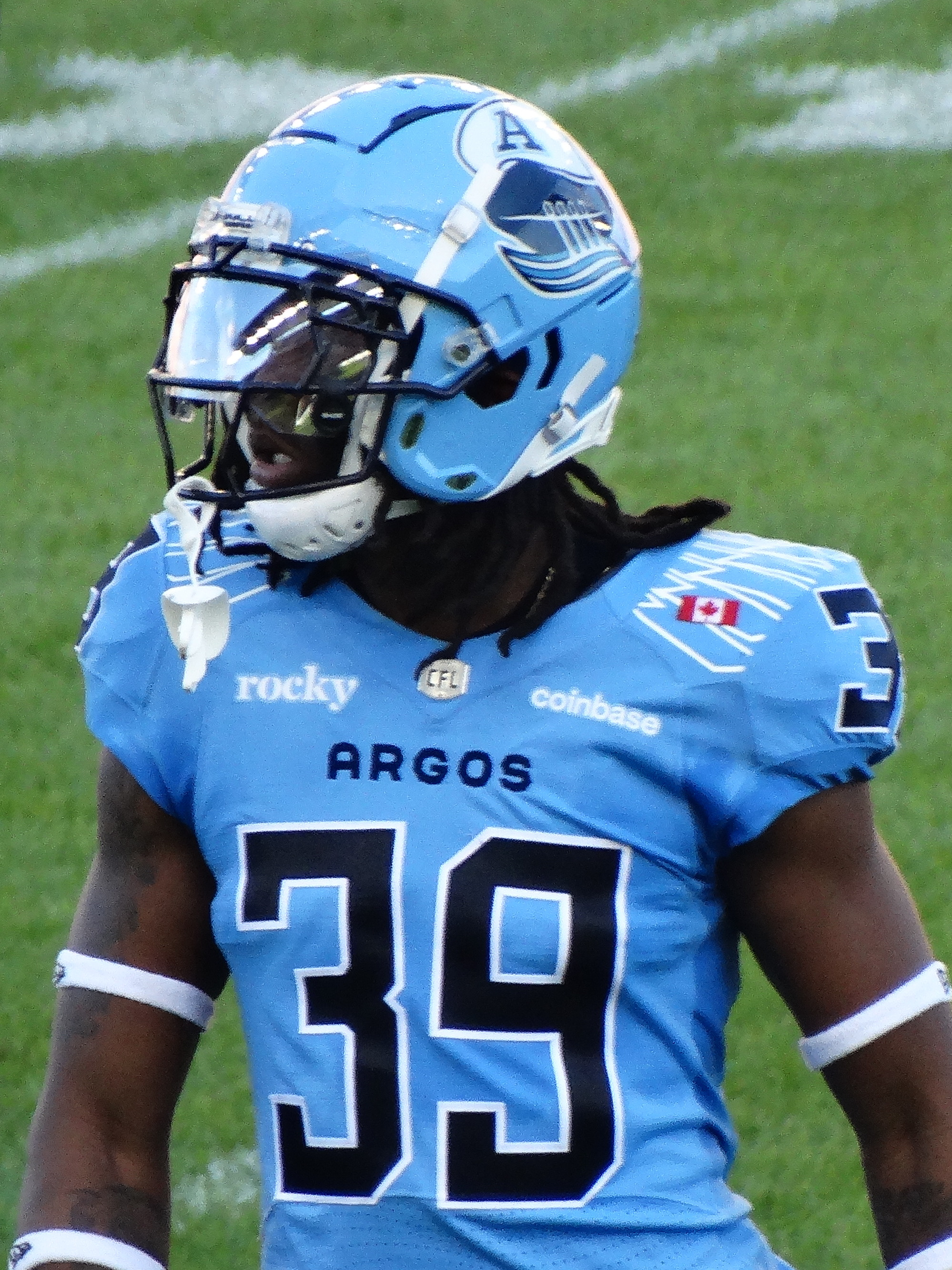
- Drew with the Toronto Argonauts in 2025

No. 22 – DC Defenders
- Position: Defensive back
- Roster status: Active

Personal information
- Born: July 5, 2000 (age 26); Smithfield, Virginia, U.S.
- Listed height: 6 ft 0 in (1.83 m)
- Listed weight: 193 lb (88 kg)

Career information
- High school: Smithfield
- College: James Madison (2018–2019); Virginia State (2020–2023)
- NFL draft: 2024: undrafted

Career history
- Carolina Panthers (2024)*; Toronto Argonauts (2024)*; DC Defenders (2025); Toronto Argonauts (2025); DC Defenders (2026–present)
- * Offseason or practice squad member only

Awards and highlights
- UFL champion (2025); Grey Cup champion (2024)
- Stats at Pro Football Reference
- Stats at CFL.ca

Willie Robert Drew Jr. (born July 5, 2000) is an American professional football defensive back for the DC Defenders of the United Football League (UFL). He most recently played for the Toronto Argonauts of the Canadian Football League (CFL). He played college football at James Madison and Virginia State. He has also been a member of the Carolina Panthers of the National Football League (NFL).

== Early life ==
Drew attended high school at Smithfield High School. In Drew's first game as a senior he set a school and Bay Rivers District record throwing for 388 yards and four touchdowns on 21 completions. In his senior season, Drew notched 50 tackles with five interception. Drew was also the team's quarterback where he threw for 1,447 yards and 14 touchdowns, while also rushing for 1,154 yards and 18 touchdowns. Coming out of high school, Drew decided to commit to play college football for the FCS powerhouse James Madison Dukes.

== College career ==
=== James Madison ===
Drew played two seasons with James Madison in 2018 and 2019 where he totaled nine tackles and two pass deflections in eleven games.

=== Virginia State ===
In 2021, Drew decided to transfer to play for the Virginia State Trojans. During the 2023 season, Drew tallied 16 pass deflections and six interception en route to being named an AFCA first-team All-American. Drew finished his three year career with the Trojans playing in 27 games notching 37 pass deflections, 11 interceptions, a fumble recovery, and a touchdown. Drew was also named the Central Intercollegiate Athletic Association Defensive Player of the Year. After declaring for the 2024 NFL draft, Drew was invited to the Reese's senior bowl and to the 2024 NFL Scouting Combine.

== Professional career ==
Pre-draft measurables
Height	Weight	Arm length	Hand span	Wingspan	40-yard dash	10-yard split	20-yard split	20-yard shuttle	Three-cone drill	Vertical jump	Broad jump	Bench press
5 ft 11 5/8 in (1.82 m)	191 lb (87 kg)	32 in (0.81 m)	9 1/2 in (0.24 m)	6 ft 3 5/8 in (1.92 m)	4.46 s	1.49 s	2.58 s	4.42 s	6.90 s	36 in (0.91 m)	9 ft 7 in (2.92 m)	13 reps
All values from NFL Combine/Pro Day

=== Carolina Panthers ===
Drew went undrafted in the 2024 NFL Draft, and signed with the Carolina Panthers as an undrafted free agent. He was waived on August 27.

=== Toronto Argonauts (first stint) ===
Drew was signed to the practice roster of the Toronto Argonauts on September 23, 2024. He remained on the practice roster through the team's playoff run, including the team's 111th Grey Cup victory over the Winnipeg Blue Bombers. His contract expired the next day on November 18, 2024.

=== DC Defenders ===
On December 4, 2024, Drew signed with the DC Defenders of the United Football League (UFL). He was released on August 8, 2025.

=== Toronto Argonauts (second stint) ===
Drew was signed to the Argonauts' practice roster on August 12, 2025. He was promoted to the active roster on August 31, 2025. He played in seven regular season games where he had 14 defensive tackles and one interception. He was released in the following offseason on January 16, 2026.

=== DC Defenders (second stint) ===
On February 7, 2026, Drew signed with the DC Defenders of the United Football League (UFL).
