= Bartlett, Virginia =

Unincorporated community in Virginia, United States

Coordinates: 36°56′28″N 76°32′13″W

Bartlett is an unincorporated community in Isle of Wight County, Virginia, United States. It is located at the junction of U.S. Route 17, U.S. Route 258, and State Route 32, on the James River Bridge approach southeast of Smithfield.
