= Virginia State Route 32 =

State highway in eastern Virginia, US

State Route 32

Route information
- Maintained by VDOT
- Length: 38.89 mi (62.59 km)
- Existed: 1940–present

Major junctions
- South end: NC 32 in Suffolk
- SR 337 in Suffolk; US 13 / US 58 / US 460 in Suffolk; US 258 / SR 10 in Benns Church; US 17 in Bartlett; US 60 in Newport News
- North end: US 17 / US 258 / SR 143 in Newport News

Location
- Country: United States
- State: Virginia
- Counties: City of Suffolk, Isle of Wight, City of Newport News

Highway system
- Virginia Routes; Interstate; US; Primary; Secondary; Byways; History; HOT lanes
← SR 31	→ US 33

State Route 32 (SR 32) is a primary state highway in the U.S. state of Virginia. The state highway runs 38.89 miles (62.59 km) from the North Carolina state line in Suffolk north to U.S. Route 17 (US 17), US 258, and SR 143 in Newport News. The southernmost part of SR 32 connects Suffolk with the Albemarle Region of North Carolina via North Carolina Highway 32 (NC 32). The remainder of SR 32 runs concurrently with at least one other state or U.S. Highway between Suffolk and Newport News, including US 13, SR 10, US 258, and US 17. The last two highways run together with SR 32 on the James River Bridge.

== Route description ==
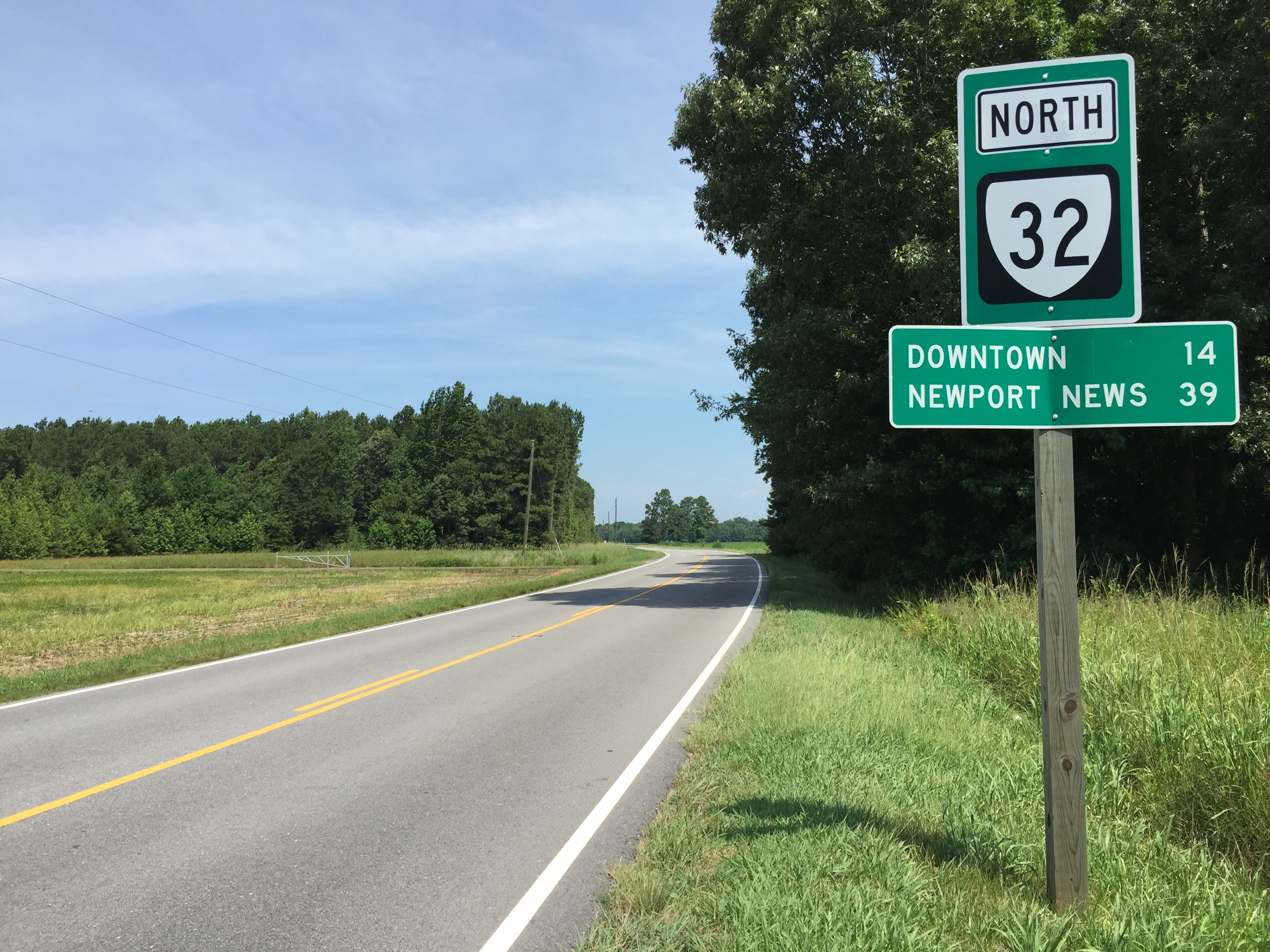
View north near the south end of SR 32 at NC 32 at the North Carolina state line in Suffolk

SR 32 begins at the North Carolina state line in a rural portion of the city of Suffolk. The border crossing, from which the highway continues south as NC Hwy 32 in Gates County (Virginia Rd in Chowan County), is a short distance west of Great Dismal Swamp National Wildlife Refuge and much closer to the North Carolina community of Corapeake than the developed portion of Suffolk. SR 32 heads north as two-lane undivided Carolina Road, which the highway follows to its intersection with US 13 (Whaleyville Boulevard) next to Suffolk Municipal Airport. SR 32 and US 13 continue north along Carolina Road, now a four-lane divided highway, to a partial interchange with the southwestern end of the Suffolk Bypass. US 13 exits onto the bypass toward a junction with US 58 while US 13 Business joins SR 32 as Carolina Road reduces to a five-lane road with a center left-turn lane. The two highways reduce to a four-lane undivided highway as they intersect a Norfolk Southern Railway's Franklin District south of downtown Suffolk. SR 32 and US 13 Business cross over Norfolk Southern Railway's Norfolk District at the southern edge of downtown Suffolk.

At their intersection with SR 337 (Washington Street), SR 10 begins and joins SR 32 and US 13 Business north as Main Street through downtown Suffolk. The highways intersect CSX's Portsmouth Subdivision railroad line before reaching US 58 Business (Constance Road), where US 13 Business turns east and US 460 Business joins SR 32 and SR 10. The three highways cross the Nansemond River and pass through a commercial area as a five-lane road with a center left-turn lane. In the community of Elephant Fork, US 460 Business splits northwest as Pruden Boulevard while SR 32 and SR 10 continue north on Godwin Boulevard. The state highways expand to a four-lane divided highway just south of their partial cloverleaf interchange with the Suffolk Bypass, which carries US 13, US 58, and US 460 around the north side of Suffolk. SR 32 and SR 10 pass Sentara Obici Memorial Hospital and through a commercial area before entering farmland. The two highways reduce to a two-lane undivided road just before crossing the Western Branch of the Nansemond River.

SR 32 and SR 10 intersect SR 125 (Kings Highway) in the community of Chuckatuck before leaving Suffolk and entering Isle of Wight County, where the highway expands to a four-lane divided highway named Benns Church Boulevard. The two state highways diverge at Benns Church, where SR 32 joins US 258 on Brewers Neck Boulevard. The two highways head east through Carrollton to an intersection with US 17 (Carrollton Boulevard). SR 32, US 17, and US 258 head northeast to cross the James River on the James River Bridge. Just after entering the city of Newport News, the three highways meet US 60 (Warwick Boulevard) at a partial cloverleaf interchange. Just east of there, the highways cross over CSX's Peninsula Subdivision and SR 32 reaches its eastern terminus at SR 143 (Jefferson Avenue). US 17 turns north onto Jefferson Avenue toward Yorktown while US 258 continues east on Mercury Boulevard toward Hampton.

== Major intersections ==
County	Location	mi	km	Destinations	Notes
City of Suffolk		0.00	0.00	NC 32 south (Virginia Road) – Edenton	North Carolina state line; southern terminus
City of Suffolk		9.46	15.22	US 13 south (Whaleyville Boulevard) – Whaleyville, Ahoskie	Southern end of US 13 concurrency
City of Suffolk		11.10	17.86	US 13 north to US 58 – Norfolk, Emporia	Northern end of US 13 concurrency; southern end of US 13 Bus. concurrency; interchange
City of Suffolk		13.15	21.16	Washington Street (SR 337)	Southern end of SR 10 concurrency
see SR 10 (mile 93.58-78.28)
Isle of Wight	Benns Church	28.45	45.79	US 258 south / SR 10 west (Benns Church Boulevard) – Smithfield, Richmond, Smithfield Historic District, St. Luke's Church	Northern end of SR 10 concurrency; southern end of US 258 concurrency
Isle of Wight	Bartlett	31.30	50.37	US 17 south (Carrollton Boulevard) – Portsmouth	Southern end of US 17 concurrency
James River		33.47– 38.11	53.86– 61.33	James River Bridge	
City of Newport News		38.33	61.69	US 60 (Warwick Boulevard) – Fort Eustis, Downtown Newport News	Interchange
City of Newport News		38.89	62.59	US 17 north / SR 143 (Jefferson Avenue) to US 258 north (Mercury Boulevard) / I-64 – Williamsburg, Hampton, Norfolk, Langley Field, Fort Monroe, Newport News Marine Terminal	Northern terminus; northern end of US 17 / US 258 concurrencies
1.000 mi = 1.609 km; 1.000 km = 0.621 mi: Concurrency terminus

< SR 102	Spurs of SR 10; 1923–1928	SR 104 >
< SR 504	District 5 State Routes; 1928–1933	SR 506 >
