= St. Luke's Church (Smithfield, Virginia) =

Historic church in Virginia, US

- Saint Luke's Church (Smithfield)
- U.S. National Register of Historic Places
- U.S. National Historic Landmark
- Virginia Landmarks Register
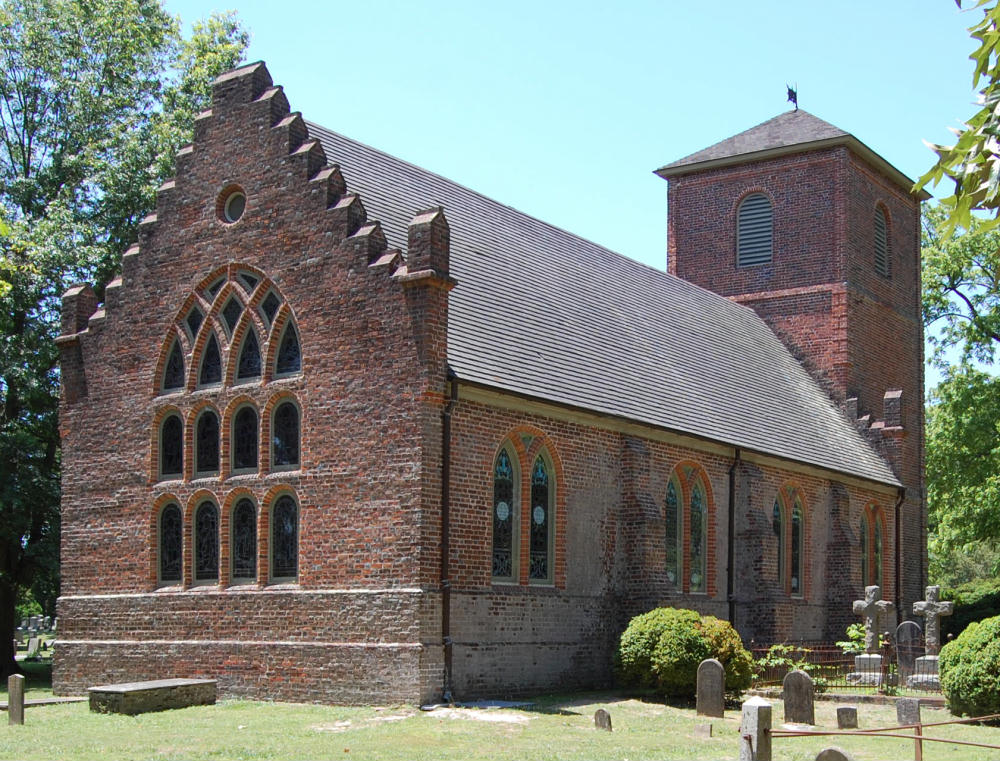

- Location within Virginia Location within the United States
- Location: Benns Church, Virginia
- Nearest city: Smithfield, Virginia
- Coordinates: 36°56′26″N 76°35′06″W
- Area: 5 acres (2.0 ha)
- Built: 1682
- Architectural style: Single Room Vernacular Brick Church of Artisan Mannerism Style.
- NRHP reference No.: 66000838
- VLR No.: 046-0024

Significant dates
- Added to NRHP: October 15, 1966
- Designated NHL: October 9, 1960
- Designated VLR: September 9, 1969

St. Luke's Church, also known as Old Brick Church, or Newport Parish Church, is a historic church building, located in the unincorporated community of Benns Church, near Smithfield in Isle of Wight County, Virginia, United States. It is the oldest church in Virginia and oldest church in British North America of brick construction. According to local tradition the structure was built in 1632, but other evidence points to a date of 1682; see Dating controversy.

On October 15, 1966, St. Luke's was designated a National Historic Landmark and was listed on the National Register of Historic Places in recognition of its historic and architectural distinction. In 1957 President Dwight D. Eisenhower designated the site a National Shrine in concert with the 350th anniversary of Jamestown.

Since 1954 Historic St. Luke's Restoration, doing business as Historic St. Luke's Church, is a 501(c)(3) non-profit organization that maintains, preserves, promotes, and interprets the 17th-century, 100-acre historic site. Historic St. Luke's does not receive any federal, state, or municipal funding. All funding comes from private corporations, foundations, and individuals.

== Architecture ==
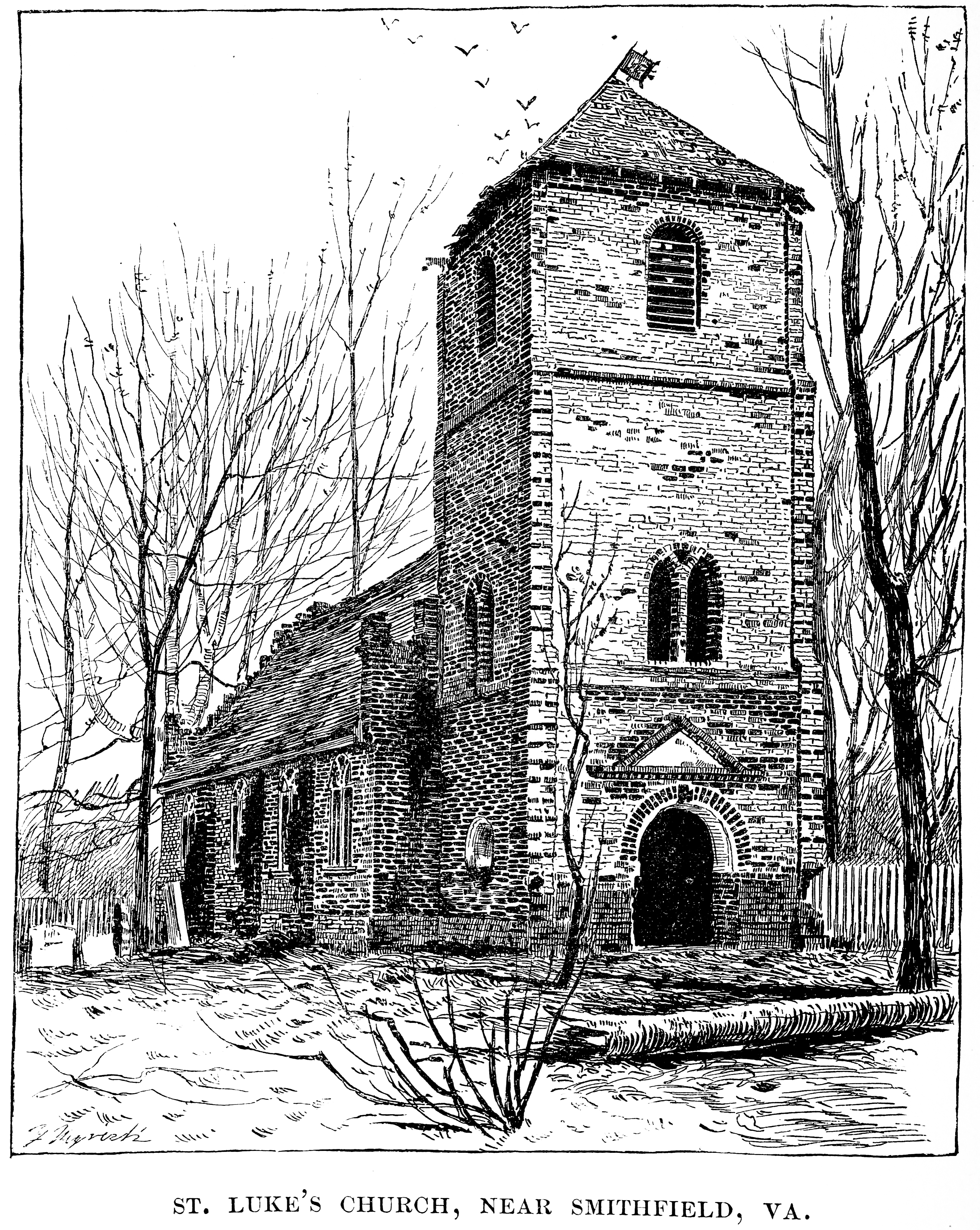
Engraving published 1885

Once known as "Old Brick Church", St. Luke's is described by College of William & Mary professor and Colonial Williamsburg Foundation architectural historian Carl Lounsbury as an Artisan Mannerism style in which masons and other builders both designed and built without the guiding hand of an architect. Other examples of such architecture include Bacon's Castle in nearby Surry County, Virginia and exhibit Cavalier or Royalist sensibilities. St. Peter's Church in New Kent, Virginia is a later, less ornate style reflecting the Glorious Revolution of Dutch-English monarchs William & Mary.

The plan is that of a single room (29 ft 4 3/4 in or 8.96 m × 65 ft 7 3/4 in or 20.01 m) with a twenty-foot-square (1.9 m^{2}) tower at the west end. The walls are laid in a rough Flemish bond. The buttresses with sloping set-offs project prominently from three bays of the north and south walls. At both the east and west end of the church are crow-stepped gables, while unadorned turrets, corbelled slightly at their bases, decorate the corners of the building.

The original windows were replaced in the 19th century. Those Victorian windows remain in place today. The stained glass windows above the altar were produced in Germany. The current doors were added in the 1950s.

== Architectural details ==
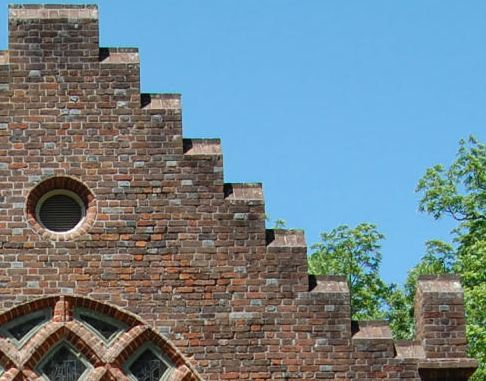
Detail of gables and elliptical window

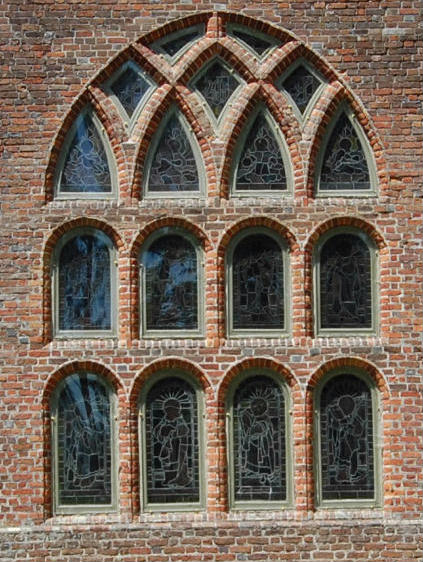
Great window in the east end

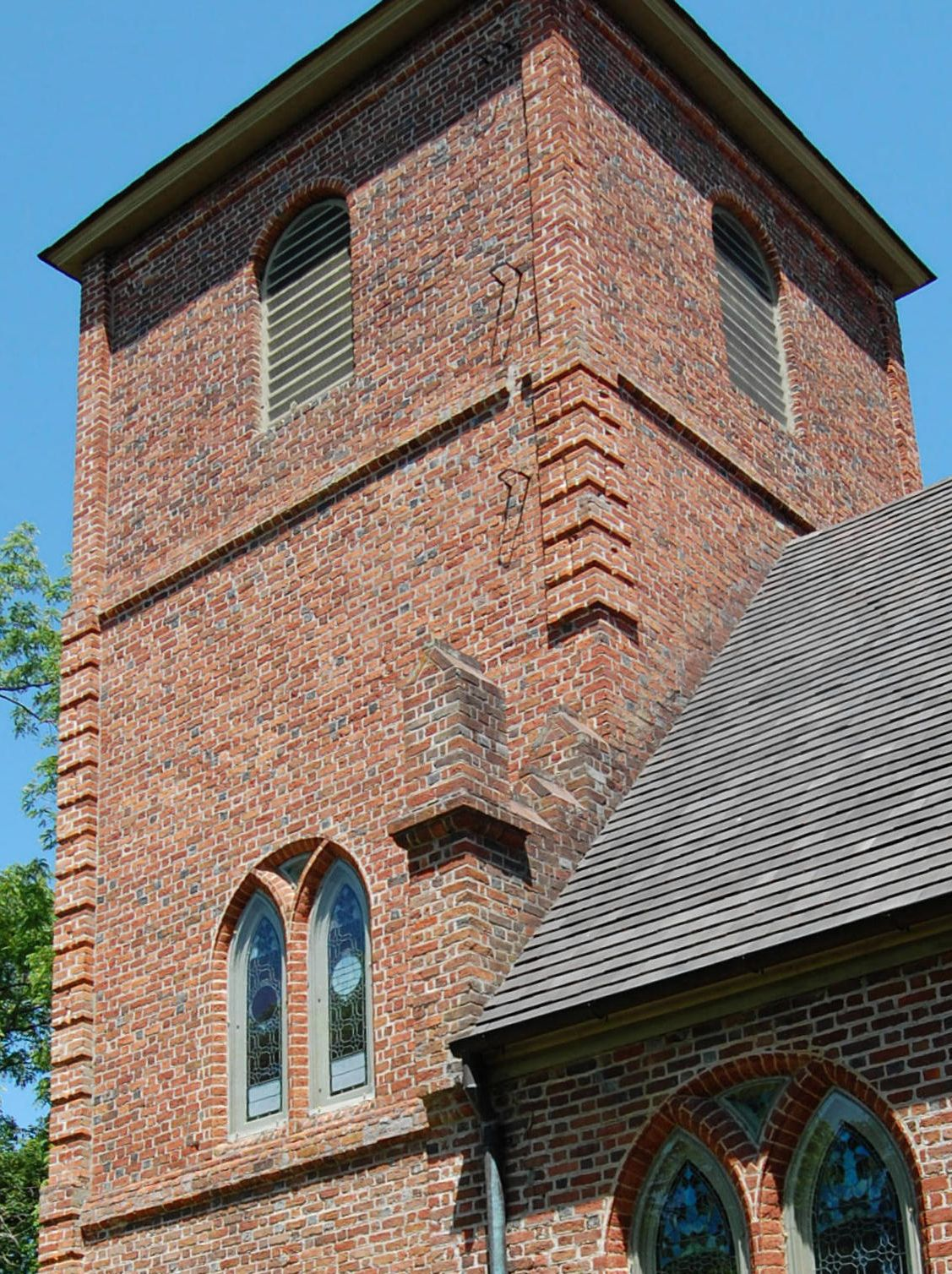
Tower, quoins and windows

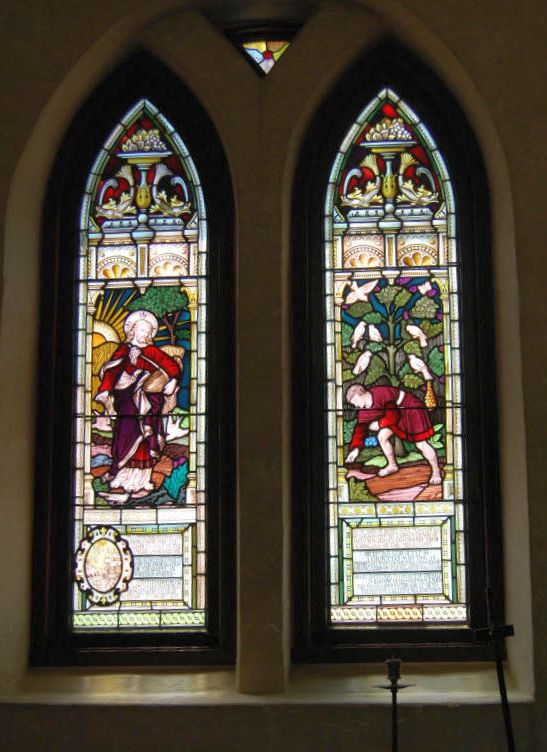
Interior view of window showing Victorian glass

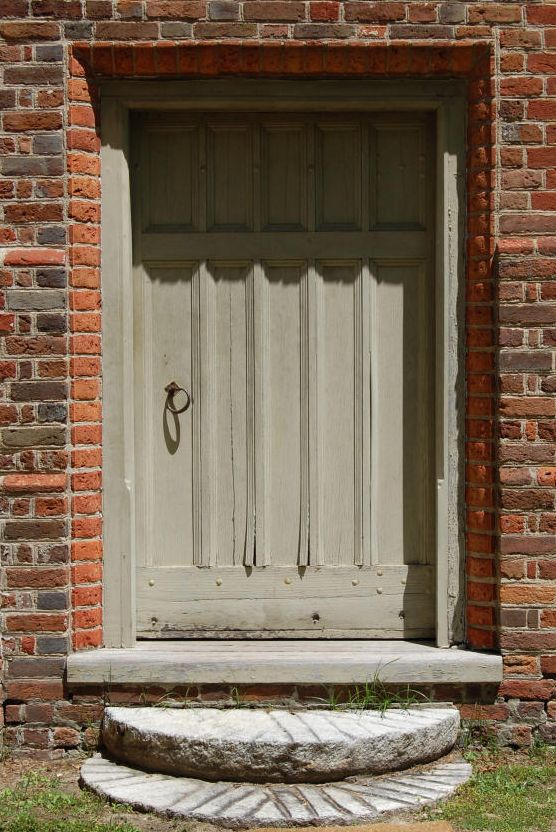
First vestry door on the south wall

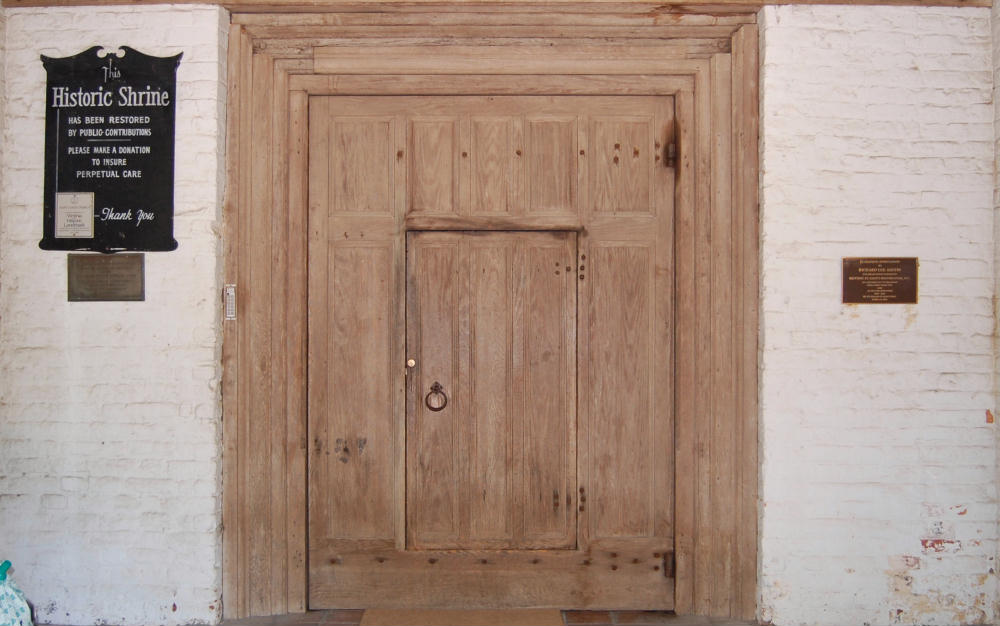
Western entrance – wicket door

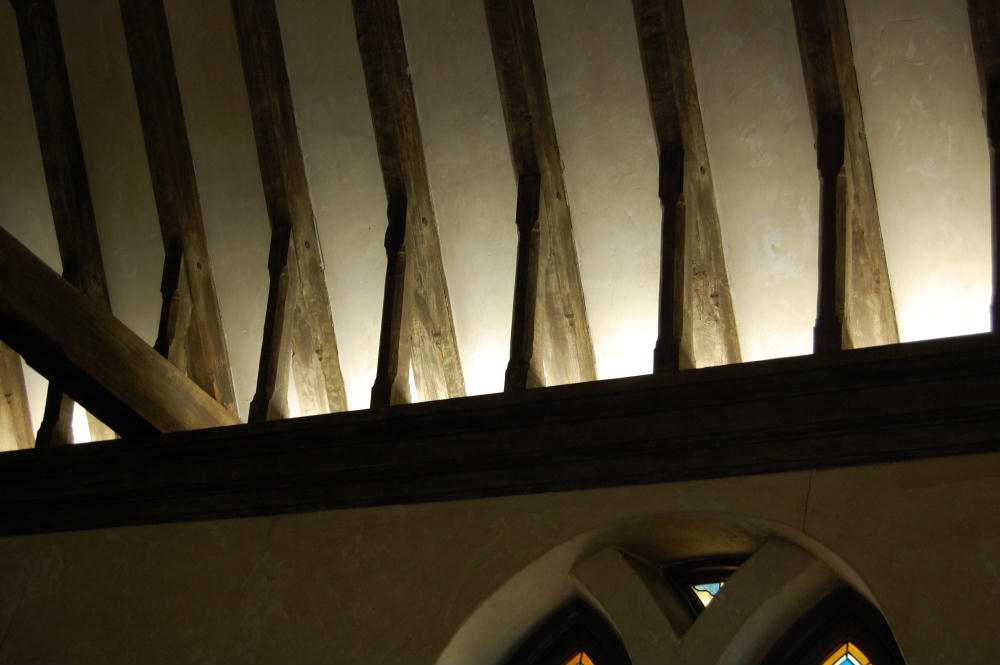
Rafter footings

=== Parish affiliation ===
Newport Parish dates from the formation of Warrosquyoake plantation. The details of parish and political entities are as follows:

- 1629 Warrosquyoake Parish formed
- 1634 Included in the list of original shires
- 1634 Isle of Wight County formed
- 1643 Divided into upper (Warrosquyoake) and lower parish (Newport)
- 1733 Brunswick Country formed from Isle of Wight County
- 1743 Lower sections of Warrosquyoake and Newport Parishes combined as Newport Parish and upper sections into Nottoway Parish (later Nottoway Parish became Southampton Parish).
- 1749 Southampton County formed from Isle of Wight County
- 1836 Christ Episcopal Church of Newport Parish in Smithfield, Virginia

=== Architecture ===
The architecture of Newport Parish Church is a combination of the 17th century room church embellished with Gothic features. Unlike the English Gothic church characterized by separate wings containing the nave, aisles and chancel, the room church reduces these divided spaces into a single rectangular space. All Virginia vernacular churches employ this room structure. In the case of Newport Parish, a simplified form of a rood screen, as in several extant English room churches, separates the nave from the chancel. In fact, in this edifice, the oldest Anglican church in the state, the essential features of the room church are all in place. They are:

- Rectangular building
- General ratio of 2:1 length to width
- Oriented east-west
- Main entrance via west door
- Southeast vestry door
- Single story sidewall elevation
- East window.

Gothic features are principally in embellishments to the structure rather than major structural details:

- steeply pitched A-roof with crow-stepped or curvilinear gables
- Y-tracery windows with brick modillions
- semi-circular arches at doorways with "embryonic pediments"
- beamed ceilings with plaster
- plain cornices
- porches, buttresses, or towers.

=== Brickwork ===
The church itself is 60 1/2 feet (18.4 m) east-west and 24 1/4 feet (7.4 m) north-south in the clear.

The church is laid in Flemish bond in water tables, walls, and tower. The tower is an integral part of the structure unlike that of the Jamestown Church tower whose unfinished mortar joints on its east wall indicate that it was erected after the main church building and the clearly documented, added tower at St. Peter's Church, New Kent County. Unlike any other standing Virginia colonial church, there are two water tables each nine bricks high. The transitions from the water tables are accomplished using beveled bricks. There are no glazed headers in the walls that are 36 inches (910 mm) wide at the foundations, 26 inches (660 mm) thick in the walls, and 30 inches (760 mm) thick in the tower.

Three buttresses with three ramps each support the north and south sides of the church, separating the walls into three bays and a chancel, each of which contains a Y-tracery window. The bevels of the buttresses follow the water table in height, each being nine bricks tall. The church is singular among standing churches in having buttresses: the only other documented buttresses are at the Jamestown Church of 1639 to 1647 and the second Bruton Parish Church of 1680.

The walls continue for 38 courses above the water tables. Obvious repairs are present throughout the building due to a storm that collapsed the walls in 1887 and include:

- entire upper east wall
- crow steps and towers on the gables
- windows on the south and north walls
- east side of the tower along the gables
- two elliptical windows on the north and south sides of the porch
- sills of some of the principal windows.

Two thousand bricks from the Jamestown Church of 1639–1647 were included in repairs during the 1890s.

=== Roof ===
The present roof, replaced in the 1950s is constructed internally of massive tie-beams and a plastered ceiling, though the original was most likely a principal rafter roof similar to that of the third Bruton Parish Church. The roof beams are decorated with chamfer and lamb's tongue moldings. The present slate shingles are, of course, not the original roofing material which most likely was cedar shingles or clapboards painted or covered with tar.

The ends of the east gable consist of a corbelled turret on the outside corners with eight crow steps rising to the middle. The crow steps on the west wall are truncated by the presence of the tower and so have only 1½ steps. Other colonial structures with gables are few and include Bacon's Castle(1665) the second Bruton Parish Church, (1680s), and St. Peter's Church, New Kent County (1701) all of which are characterized by Flemish curved gables instead of crow step gables. All of the cornices are modern replacements.

=== Tower ===
The tower, the only one known to be an original feature of a colonial church in Virginia, stands to the west of the main church building and is 18 feet (5.5 m) east-west and 20 feet (6.1 m) north-south at the outside ground level. It is 60 feet (18 m) tall and consists of three stories. The corners of the first two stories of the three-story tower are embellished by rusticated brick quoins of a row of two horizontally raised bricks divided by a projecting row of thin bricks with a vertical V in the center. The third story, presumably added some time after the rest of the tower, is surmounted by a slate shingled, hipped roof with a modern weather vane at the crest. The southern and northern faces of the tower bear a single window on each story. From bottom to top they are: 1) an open oval ellipse three feet horizontally and two feet vertically; 2) a Y-tracery window matching the principal windows; and 3) a compass widow with a brick arch and louvers. The west façade is identical except that the lower story contains a round bricked arch with a simple, whitewashed tympanum above it. The bottom of the tower is open and serves as a porch.

=== Windows ===
The windows of St. Luke's Church are unique among colonial windows and the major element that gives the edifice an artisan mannerism character. The east window is a "great lancet consisting of two tiers of four circular-headed windows." The two bottom courses consist of rows of four round-headed windows above which are a row of gothic arched windows, three diamond-shaped windows, and a pair of elongated, horizontal triangles as spandrels. Each of the east windows as well as the Y-tracery windows in the rest of the church are separated by modillions of molded, rubbed brick consisting of an ovolo (convex) and fillet (flat) shapes and an ovolo sill. There is a small, elliptical window above the great window. The presence of a great window is indicated in a few other, early churches in Virginia, namely St. Peter's, New Kent County (1701) and Upper and Lower Middlesex Country churches (1714 and 1717). Later churches without exception had chancel windows matching the principal windows on the north and south walls.

There are eight lancet windows on the north and south edifices and three on the tower (second story south, west, and north faces) similar in general construction to the great window. They each consist of a pair of steeply arched windows with a single, smaller spandrel window completing the arch and separated with rubbed brick in the form of ovolo and fillet moldings. The sills are also of identical ovolo molded bricks.

The present Tiffany-style, stained glass windows, despite local tradition to the contrary, do not replicate the original material that was diamond-paned, leaded glass. No Virginia colonial church had stained glass windows.

=== Doorways ===
The church displays the first recorded instance of the use of a main west entrance and a south entry placed in the extreme southeast corner of the church. Both doors are recent replacements, and the exact form of the western door is unknown.

The principal entrance is through the tower archway by way of a large, semi-circular arch that is decorated by rubbed brick and am impost three bricks high at the lower end of the arch. The arch itself consists of voussoirs with plastered over, white bricks forming the interior of the arch. Above the arch is a primitive, triangular tympanum the lower line of which extends beyond the raked borders. It is embellished by a fascia on the outer course with a fillet and ovolo on the inner course. It was alternately decorated with white cement, a marble tablet, and now a wash of mortar.

The western inner entrance is now a wicket door patterned after that of Yeocomico Church although it is unpainted. Previously, there were two central opening, compass-headed doors at the outer entrance of the porch arch. The southern entrance is a square-headed, battened door with decorative, molded bricks in the shape of an ovolo surrounding it. The images from the Library of Congress site are worth study, for they show in the late 1950s a compass headed door at this entrance that is evidenced by brick repairs above the doorway.

=== Interior ===
The only written record of the interior is from 1746 in which the wives of justices and vestrymen were assigned a box pew in the northern corner of the chancel and young women of the parish were assigned their former pews. There is one original baluster (the second from the left end on the altar rail). The rood screen is based on footings discovered in the 1950s while the sounding board, that is 17th-century in origin, was found in 1894 in a barn at Macclesfield, a nearby plantation. The single baluster and sounding board are the only original interior appointments.

The original interior appointments were long ago destroyed and the present is a restoration from the 1950s. It consists of a square pew of each side of the altar, two box pews west of the chancel screen, and seventeen slip pews in the nave.

The pulpit is a reconstruction three-decker of 1950s origin; Rawlings postulates that a two-decker pulpit originally was built due to the lack of space for a clerk's desk.

The main aisle is T-shaped and paved with square bricks whose pattern is derived from the original floor. Under the pews are wooden, reproduction floors. At the west end of the church is a gallery that originally had oak balusters and was restored during the 1950s The interior of the tower shows a portion of original plaster under a piece of glass, and it is covered with "mortar wash on the walls and exposed beams". Portions of the wooden interior sills of the second-story tower windows may be original.

Much of the interior (such as the rood screen, the kneeling rail, and a medieval-style bench east of the rood screen) are suppositions based the error prone 1950s restoration. The interior also contains a reproduction wooden baptismal font, various items of furniture, and various ecclesiastical furnishings of period 17th-century origin, though not original to the church itself.

=== Summary ===
St. Luke's Church is Virginia's oldest church. Its construction demonstrates the progression from the crude, wooden churches of the early 17th century to more permanent brick structures leading to the simple room churches characteristic of the Virginia vernacular church in its full development, such as in Ware Church (1710–1715), a rectangular church with an unadorned exterior and elaborate triangular and semi-circular pediments. Like Yeocomico Church, such features as the bell tower, enclosed west porch, elaborate quoins, and Y-tracery windows belong to a formative period of church building whose features were soon to pass. The present restoration, according to architectural historians, leaves much to be desired in its fanciful and poorly documented elements:

- "...the restorers let the assumed date of St. Luke's shape their assessment of the physical evidence."
- "Although so much has been done for the church by so many – and a great deal of it admirable in both intention and execution – it must reluctantly be acknowledged that several false steps have been taken ..."

== Cemetery ==
Burials in the church cemetery include those of Virginia Lieutenant Governor Allie Edward Stakes Stephens and his wife; the couple were active in the movement to preserve the church. Also interred in the cemetery is Archibald Atkinson, who served in the United States House of Representatives from 1843 to 1849.

== Dating controversy ==
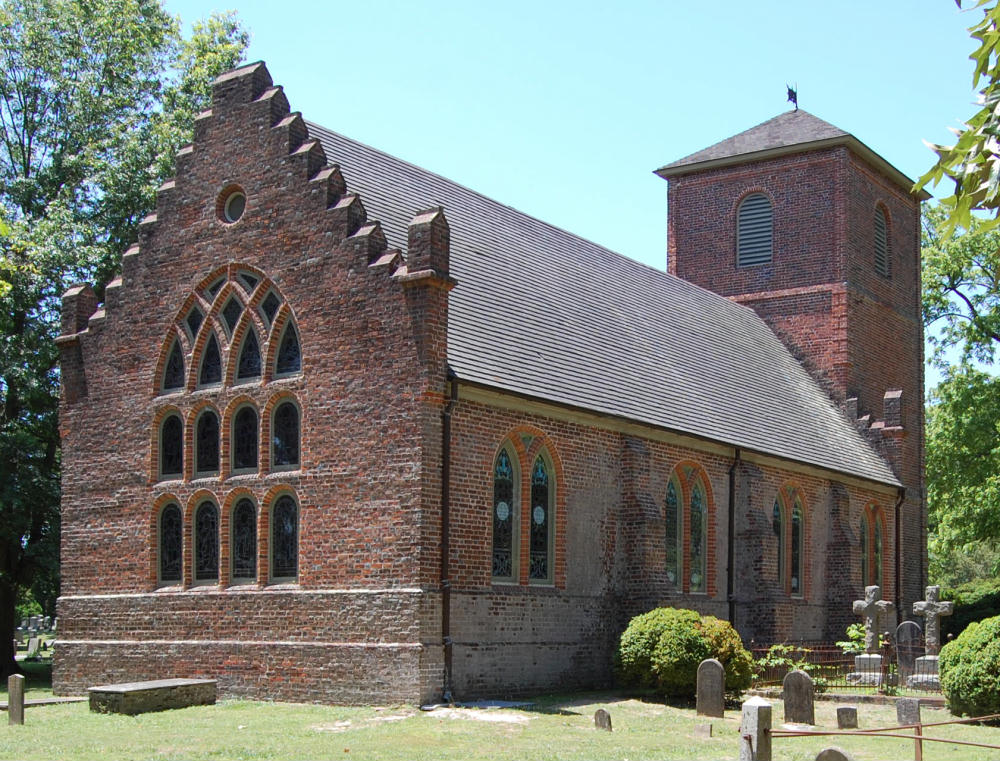
North-east view

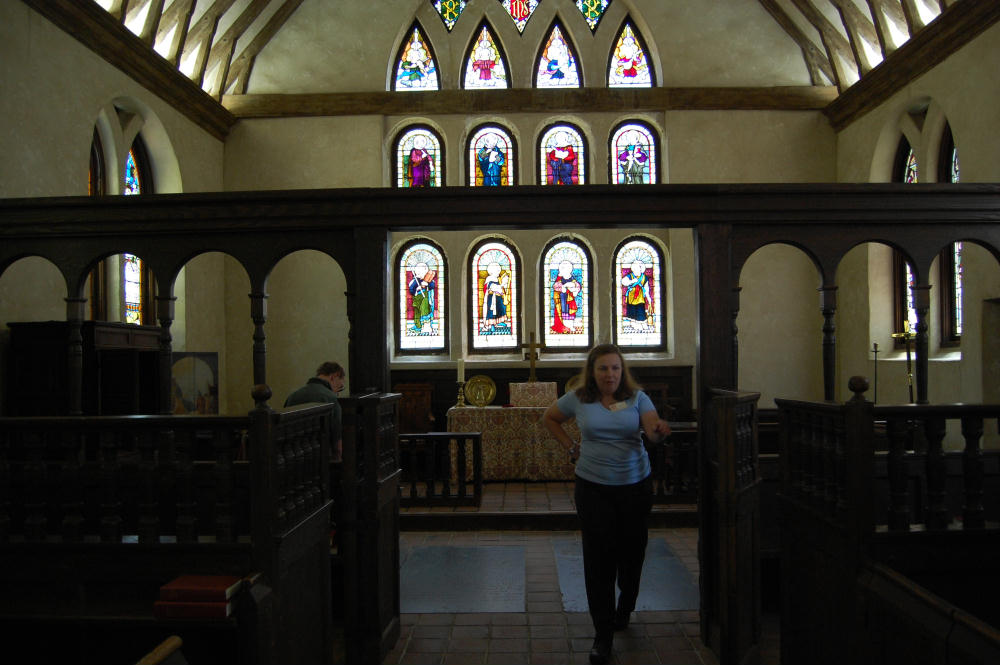
Interior with reproduction rood screen.

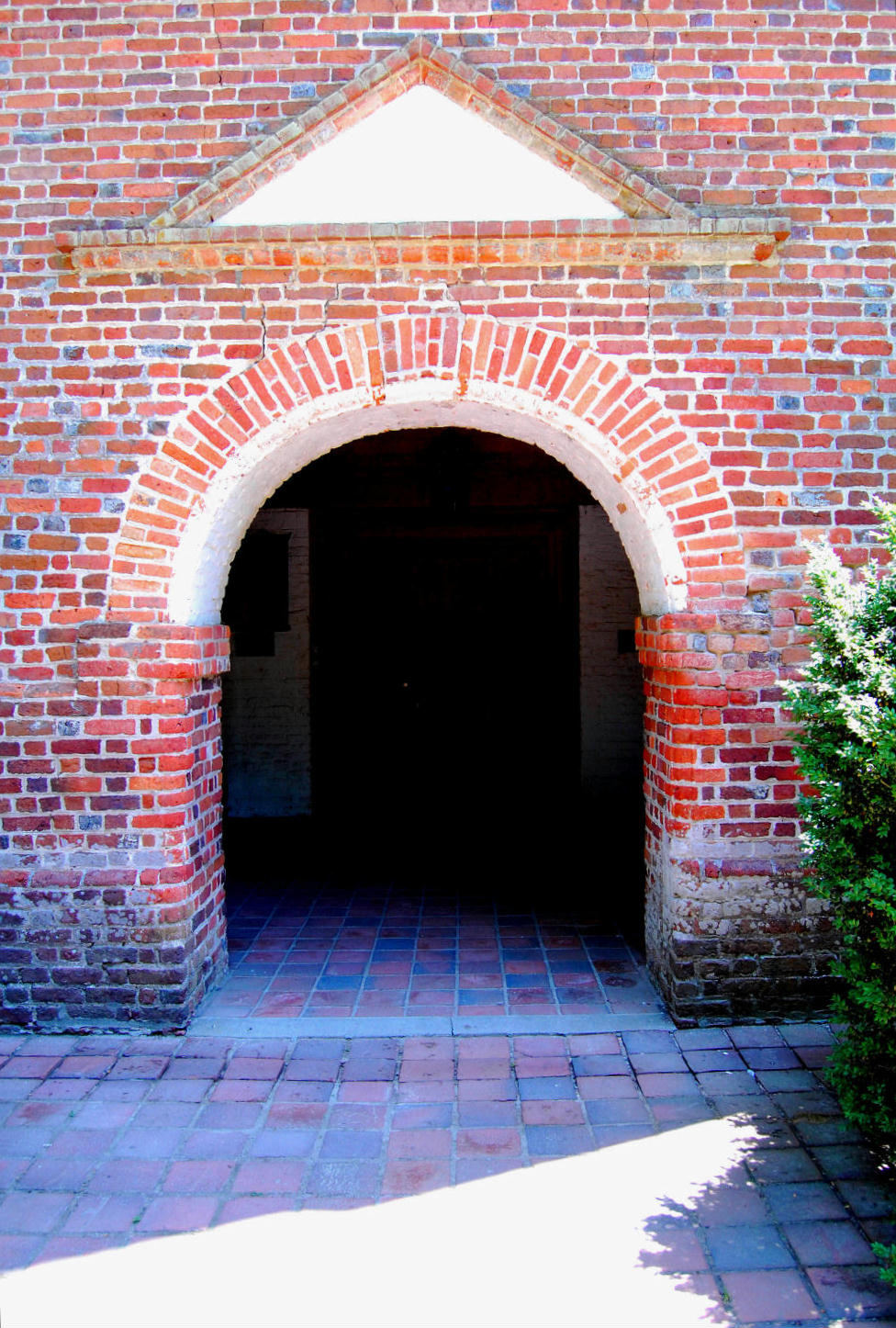
West doorway

The dating of this church with Gothic elements is a matter of disagreement between local traditions and academic researchers. Some local sources had insisted that the church can be dated to 1632 until recent dendrochronology dated the building to 1682.

The basic argument that the current brick church (rather than an earlier building on the same site) was built in 1632 had been:

- The vestry records were concealed by burial during the Revolutionary War by Colonel Josiah Parker. After they were dug up, they were read by his daughter, a Mrs. Cowper and other reliable witnesses, but then either used as wadding for muskets during the War of 1812, or simply crumpled into dust.
- Local tradition links the name of a militia Colonel Joseph Bridger who is interred in the chancel of the church to its construction.
- Bricks discovered in a roof collapse in 1887, or 1886, may bear the date 1632.
- While the predominant gothic architectural elements or the church date to the late 1680s, others, such as buttresses, crow step gables, and the principal rafter roof were also found in some early 17th-century churches.

Other evidence calls into doubt the accuracy of these assertions:

- It was common for several churches to be built on the same site generations apart. The presence of a brick church on this site does not mean that it was this brick church.
- Joseph Bridger was born in 1628 and was four years old in 1632. Some sources cite clumsy efforts to link Bridger's father with the site, but his name was Samuel, and he cannot be documented as having come to America.
- The bricks have indeterminate numerals that can be read as 1632 or 1682, and the numerals' style does not match colonial scripts. The bricks also have a mortar coating indicating that they may have been re-used as interior bricks in later repairs, alterations, or new construction. The best case scenario is the bricks were part of an earlier church at the same site, then re-used as interior bricks in the 1680 church. However, Upton asserts the bricks are clearly forgeries.
- Two other local figures, Charles and Thomas Driver, are also associated with the church, but they, like Colonel Bridger, are associated with records in the later 17th century when they were adults. There are two bricks in the third story of the tower bearing the initials CD and TD usually associated with these two men.
- The architectural features of the building can all be documented in English churches of the later 17th century or much later time periods.

General historical data militate against the establishment of such an elaborate edifice in 1632 and generally agree with a date in the 1680s:

- Other Virginia buildings from this period:
  - Bacon's Castle 1665;
  - Jamestown Church circa 1690;
  - 2nd Bruton Parish Church 1681–83;
  - St. Peter's Parish Church 1690;
  - Yeocomico Church 1706.

It is unlikely that one of these stylistically related buildings predates the others so significantly.

- The association of Joseph Bridger with the church agrees with a date in the 1680s as do the local links to the Driver brothers (Rawlings 8; Upton 60).
- Funding for the Jamestown Church of 1639 was such a problem that it took until 1647 to complete the church. Could a more elaborate church been constructed in sparsely populated Isle of Wight in 1632?
- A compromise theory that the church was begun in the 1630s and then completed or modified fifty years later, resulting in the present edifice is also posited. According to this assertion, the church walls were laid in 1632 while the interior, and possibly the roof, were not completed until the 1680s. Evidence for this can be found in the bell tower that clearly shows that the lower two stories were built earlier than the upper story.

Mason, Rawlings, and Upton all agree that 1632 is far too early a date for this edifice:

- Mason states, "Since... [All evidence]... point[s] to a later date than the traditional one,... it seems probable that the Old Brick Church was completed by Charles and Thomas Driver, as master workmen, under the direction of Colonel Joseph Bridger, about 1682, and that it succeeded an earlier brick church built on the same site, about 1632...".
- Rawlings says, "Suffice it to say here that it seems hazardous to claim any date before 1665 and wiser to accept 1682 as the most likely year for its erection, as probably a second church on the same site."
- And Upton asserts, "St Luke's similarities to [the previously cited buildings]... suggests [sic] a date in the fourth quarter of the seventeenth century for the Isle of Wight county building... [in] the years around 1680... when a rectangular building based on the room churches, developed in rural England early in the same century, became the characteristic form of the Virginia vernacular church."
- A recent study by The James River Institute for Archaeology, Inc., cites dendrochronological and architectural evidence that the church was constructed in the early 1680s.

== Current operations ==
Since 1954, St. Luke's Church has been administered by Historic St. Luke's Restoration. The 100-acre historic site and museum provide guided tours for individuals and groups seven days per week between February and December – only closed in January. Visitors receive 45-minute guided tours beginning from the origins of the Anglican church through its restorations.

The Site is also available for private rentals including weddings, funerals, baptisms, and other special events. An independent board of directors administers ultimate oversight of annual operations, budgets, and fund raising projects.

== Current condition ==
Since the most recent restoration project of 2012, St. Luke's is structurally well-preserved for years to come. Daily maintenance of the buildings and property remains a challenge.

As of April 2015 a major project is underway – the Historic St. Luke's Grounds Restoration Project (Phase 1). This $500,000 capital project is designed to restore the ponds, bridge, roadway, approaches, and landscaping and will provide responsible grounds management and access for decades to come. Phase 2 of this project is presently being explored.

== See also ==
- National Register of Historic Places listings in Virginia
- List of National Historic Landmarks in Virginia
- Oldest buildings in the United States
- Oldest churches in the United States

== Resources ==
- van Derpool, James Grote (March 1958). "The Restoration of St. Luke's, Smithfield, Virginia". The Journal of the Society of Architectural Historians. 17 (1). Society of Architectural Historians: 12–18. doi:10.2307/987832. JSTOR 987832.
- Foreman, Henry C. (1957). Virginia Architecture in the Seventeenth Century. Williamsburg.
- Morrison, Hugh (1952). Early American Architecture. New York.
- Pierson, William H. (1970). American Buildings and their Architects: The Colonial Period. New York.
- Rines, Edward F. (1936). Old Historic Churches of America. New York.
- Meade, William (1995). Old Churches, Ministers, and Families of Virginia. Philadelphia: Genealogical Publishing Co, Inc, 1847.
- Mason, George C. (1945). Colonial Churches of Tidewater Virginia. Richmond, Virginia: Whittet and Shepperson.
- Rawlings, James S. (1963). Virginia's Colonial Churches: An Architectural Guide. Richmond, Virginia: Garrett and Massie.
- Upton, Dell (1997) [1986]. Holy Things and Profane: Anglican Parish Churches in Colonial Virginia. New Haven and London: Yale University Press.
