= Smithfield High School =

Coordinates: 36°56′44″N 76°35′59.7″W

Location
- 14171 Turner Drive; Smithfield, Virginia 23430; United States

Information
- School type: Public high school
- Founded: 1906
- School district: Isle of Wight County Public Schools
- Superintendent: Theo Cramer
- Principal: Aston Williams (acting)
- Grades: 9–12
- Enrollment: 1,310 (2023-24)
- Language: English
- Colors: Blue and Vegas gold
- Athletics conference: Virginia High School League; Bay Rivers District [4A-East, District 18]
- Mascot: Packer ( Razorback Hog )
- Rival: Lafayette High School
- Website: Official site

Smithfield High School is a public high school located in Smithfield, Virginia in Isle of Wight County, south of Newport News and the James River. It is part of the Isle of Wight County Public Schools and graduated its first class in 1906. The school's current facility opened in 1980. Athletic teams compete in the Virginia High School League's AA Bay Rivers District in Region I. Smithfield High School is also fully accredited school by the Virginia Board of Education and is also part of the program 'No Child Left Behind.'

== History ==
Prior to the integration of public schools in 1968, only white students attended Smithfield High. From 1928 to 1968, black students were educated at Isle of Wight Training School, which was renamed Westside High School in 1960. Most of Smithfield High's original facility was razed in the 1990s, however its gymnasium remains intact and was mildly remodeled to become part of the Luter Family YMCA in 1995 located on James Street in downtown Smithfield. The Smithfield Public Library now sits where the original high school's classrooms once stood.

== Notable Achievements ==
- The debate team won the 2016, 2017, 2018, and 2019 Virginia High School League 4A State Championship
- ARMY JROTC, won 1st place at state competitions in 2010, and holds the Honor Unit w/ distinction award.
- The wrestling team won District/Conference titles in 2009 & 2014, 2015, 2016, 2017."Smithfield High School Wrestling Team Past Records".
- The Boys Varsity Basketball team won the 2021 Class 4 State Championship
- The Boys Varsity Soccer team won the 2021 Class 4 State Championship

== Growth and Enrollment ==
Enrollment has grown substantially over the last 20 years. Graduating classes averaged around 100 students in the 1980s, and averaged 125 in the early 1990s. By 2007, the graduating classes had exceeded 250. By 2019, the graduating classes had exceeded 350 students.

== Feeder Patterns ==
The following schools feed students into Smithfield High School:

Carrollton Elementary, PreK - 3rd.

Hardy Elementary, PreK - 4th

Westside Elementary, 4th - 6th.

Smithfield Middle School, 7th - 8th.

== Notable alumni ==
- Reggie Langhorne, NFL player for the Indianapolis Colts and Cleveland Browns
- Dyrell Roberts, college football player for Virginia Tech Hokies and current WR coach of the ECU Pirates.
- Willie Drew, college football defensive back for the Virginia State Trojans
- Chris Pierce Jr., college football tight end for the Vanderbilt Commodores
