= Rescue, Virginia =

Unincorporated community in Virginia, United States

- Unincorporated community
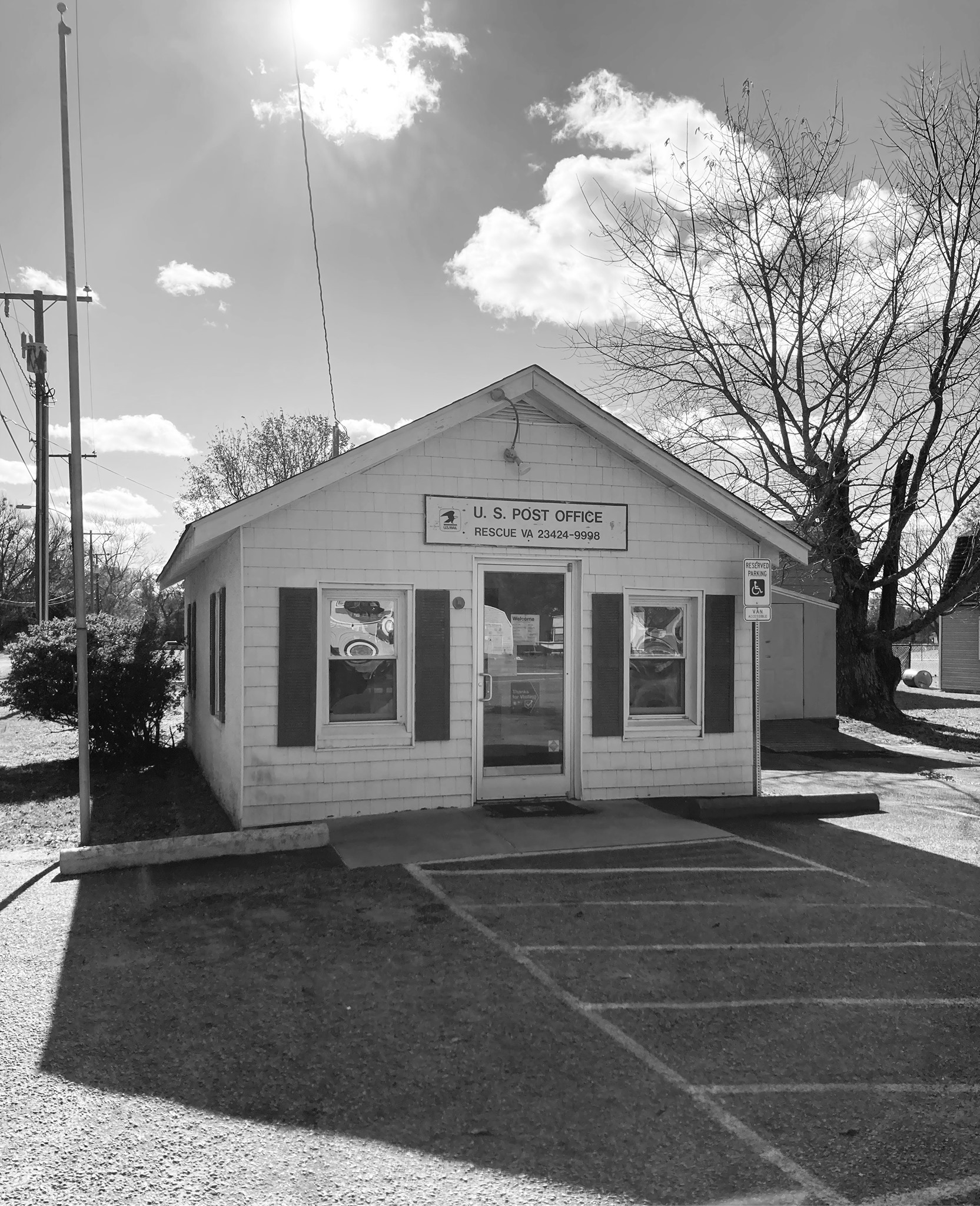
- Post office

- Location within Virginia Location within the United States
- Coordinates: 36°59′46″N 76°33′38″W
- Country: United States
- State: Virginia
- County: Isle of Wight
- Elevation: 20 ft (6.1 m)
- Time zone: UTC-5 (Eastern (EST))
  - Summer (DST): UTC-4 (EDT)
- ZIP code: 23424
- Area codes: 757, 948
- GNIS feature ID: 1493477

Rescue is an unincorporated community in Isle of Wight County, Virginia, United States. Rescue is located on Jones Creek near its confluence into the James River, 4 miles (6.4 km) east-northeast of Smithfield. Rescue has a post office with ZIP code 23424, which opened on October 21, 1889.

== History ==
This coastal village began as the subdivision of a farm in 1882. Located on the east side of the Jones Creek, approximately one-half of a mile from its mouth, it became a thriving harbor and a commercial dock for watermen engaged in fishing and oystering.

The Jones Creek separates Rescue from Battery Park and Smithfield. As folklore has it, Rescue got its name because it was difficult to get mail to Rescue, which was delivered by mule and on a certain occasion, as the mule appeared in the fishing village; someone yelled that the mail had been “rescued”.

With construction of the Rescue Bridge, connecting Rescue and Battery Park, the task of mail delivery was made easier, as well as travels to and from Smithfield. Prior to the construction of the bridge the residents had to go either by boat to Smithfield or drive the long way around by Titus Creek and Fulgham's Bridge. The location of the bridge marks a historic location with the first bridge being constructed around 1913. The history of the bridge should be preserved as integral part of Rescue's history.

Rescue continues to retain the character of a close-knit rural fishing village and the integrity of this character is intended to be protected in delineating this Village Center. Within the Village Center are homes, two marinas, a restaurant, post office, and a former community center (originally this building was the old Rescue school constructed in 1925, which ultimately served as the meeting place for the Rescue Community League and Ruritan Club). There are also two historic churches located just outside of the Village Center boundaries, Riverview United Methodist Church (founded in 1887) and the Friends Church (founded in 1913).

== Geography ==
The boundaries of the larger community of Rescue, which begins at the intersection of Boundary Road and Smith's Neck Road and encompasses lands north and east to the James River, and west to the Jones Creek. Historically, Boundary Road has always been the dividing line separating the Rescue community from the Carrollton area. The historical boundary was used for documenting birth certificates, as well as for school districting. The Jones Creek Boat Landing located at the end of Boundary Road is located in the Rescue community.
