= Benns Church, Virginia =

- Census-designated place
- Location within Virginia Location within the United States
- Coordinates: 36°56′15″N 76°35′11″W
- Country: United States
- State: Virginia
- County: Isle of Wight

Area
  - Total: 4.2 sq mi (11 km^{2})
  - Land: 4.1 sq mi (11 km^{2})
  - Water: 0.08 sq mi (0.21 km^{2})
- Elevation: 43 ft (13 m)

Population (2010)
  - Total: 872
  - Density: 210/sq mi (82/km^{2})
- Time zone: UTC−5 (Eastern (EST))
  - Summer (DST): UTC−4 (EDT)
- Area codes: 757, 948
- FIPS code: 51-06712
- GNIS feature ID: 2584808

Benns Church is a census-designated place (CDP) in Isle of Wight County, Virginia, United States. It is located at the junction of U.S. Route 258 and State Routes 10 and 32, southeast of Smithfield. As of the 2020 census, Benns Church had a population of 1,453.

The community is named for Benn's United Methodist Church, which lies at the intersection of Benn's Church Boulevard and Brewer's Neck Boulevard (US-258 with State Routes 10 and 32). The church was founded at that location by George Benn in 1789. Benn is buried in front of the church. The church bears a Virginia Historical Marker.

Benns Church is home to Benn's Grant, a 253-acre (102 ha) mixed-use development, which took almost a decade to be realized.

== Geography ==
Benns Church is bordered to the north by the town of Smithfield and to the east by Carrollton. The James River Bridge connects directly to Newport News, then to Hampton is 17 miles (27 km) east of Benns Church, across the James River, while Norfolk is 24 miles (39 km) to the southeast, and Suffolk is 16 miles (26 km) to the south.

According to the U.S. Census Bureau, the Benns Church CDP has a total area of 4.2 square miles (10.8 km^{2}), of which 4.1 square miles (10.6 km^{2}) are land and 0.1 square miles (0.2 km^{2}), or 1.92%, are water. The community drains westward to Cypress Creek, north to Jones Creek, and southeast to Brewers Creek, all of which become tidal inlets of the James River system.

== Demographics ==
Historical population
Census	Pop.	Note	%±
2010	872		—
2020	1,453		66.6%
U.S. Decennial Census; 2010 2020

Benns Church was first listed as a census designated place in the 2010 U.S. census.

=== Racial and ethnic composition ===
Benns Church CDP, Virginia – Racial and ethnic composition Note: the US Census treats Hispanic/Latino as an ethnic category. This table excludes Latinos from the racial categories and assigns them to a separate category. Hispanics/Latinos may be of any race.
Race / Ethnicity (NH = Non-Hispanic)	Pop 2010	Pop 2020	% 2010	% 2020
White alone (NH)	484	631	55.50%	43.43%
Black or African American alone (NH)	305	564	34.98%	38.82%
Native American or Alaska Native alone (NH)	2	8	0.23%	0.55%
Asian alone (NH)	13	23	1.49%	1.58%
Native Hawaiian or Pacific Islander alone (NH)	0	4	0.00%	0.28%
Other race alone (NH)	5	10	0.57%	0.69%
Mixed race or Multiracial (NH)	25	109	2.87%	7.50%
Hispanic or Latino (any race)	38	104	4.36%	7.16%
Total	872	1,453	100.00%	100.00%
