= Isle of Wight County, Virginia =

County in Virginia, United States

- County
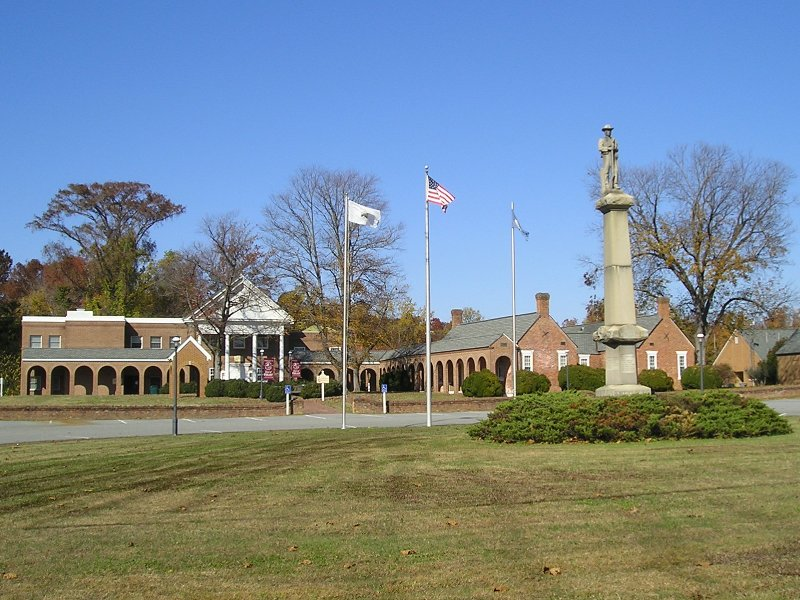
- Isle of Wight Courthouse and Confederate Monument (removed May 8, 2021).

- Flag Seal

- Location within the U.S. state of Virginia
- Coordinates: 36°55′N 76°43′W
- Country: United States
- State: Virginia
- Founded: 1637
- Named for: Isle of Wight, England
- Seat: Isle of Wight
- Largest town: Smithfield

Area
  - Total: 363 sq mi (940 km^{2})
  - Land: 316 sq mi (820 km^{2})
  - Water: 47 sq mi (120 km^{2}) 13.0%

Population (2020)
  - Total: 38,606
  - Estimate (2025): 41,321 ▲
  - Density: 110/sq mi (42/km^{2})
- Time zone: UTC−5 (Eastern)
  - Summer (DST): UTC−4 (EDT)
- Congressional district: 2nd
- Website: www.isleofwight.gov

Isle of Wight County is a county in the Hampton Roads region of the U.S. state of Virginia. It is named after the Isle of Wight, England, south of the Solent, from where many of its early colonists had come. As of the 2020 census, the population was 38,606. Its county seat is Isle of Wight, an unincorporated community. Isle of Wight County is in the Virginia Beach-Norfolk-Newport News, VA-NC Metropolitan Statistical Area. Its northeastern boundary is on the coast of Hampton Roads waterway.

== History ==
In the 17th century, shortly after establishment of the settlement at Jamestown in 1607, English settlers explored and began settling the areas adjacent to the large Hampton Roads waterway. Captain John Smith crossed the James River in 1608 and obtained fourteen bushels of corn from the Native American inhabitants, the Warrosquyoack or Warraskoyak. They were a tribe of the Powhatan Confederacy, who had three villages in the area of modern Smithfield.

Before 1619, Ensign Thomas Washer, Captain Nathaniel Basse and Giles Jones received patents for land along the Pagan River. Captain Christopher Lawne settled near the mouth of Lawne's Creek in the same vicinity. Although the area was known as Captain Lawne's Plantation and its representatives were listed as representatives from the plantation, the colonists also had named the area "Warresqueak County" after the Native American tribe who lived there. This name went through transliteration and Anglicization, eventually becoming known as "Warwicke Squeake". Washer and Lawne represented Lawne's Plantation in the first assembly of the Virginia House of Burgesses in 1619. Edward Bennett also settled on the south shore of the presently-day Isle of Wight in 1621. Several members of the Puritan Bennett family also settled nearby, including Edward's nephew, Richard Bennett. He led the Puritans to neighboring Nansemond in 1635, and later was appointed as Governor of Virginia.

English colonists drove the Warraskoyak from their villages in 1622 and 1627, as part of their reprisals for the Great Massacre of 1622, in which the Native Americans had decimated English settlements, hoping to drive them out of their territory.

By 1634, the entire Colony consisted of eight shires or counties with a total population of about 5,000 inhabitants. In 1620, a movement began to change the name of "Warresqueak County" to "Isle of Wight County", after the island off the south coast of England; this was done in 1637.

On October 20, 1673, the "Grand Assembly" at Jamestown authorized both Isle of Wight County and Lower Norfolk County to construct a fort.

St. Luke's Church, built in the 17th century, is Virginia's oldest church building. In the late 20th century, it was designated as a National Historic Landmark in recognition of its significance. Many landmark and contributing structures on the National Register are in Smithfield including the Wentworth-Grinnan House.

In 1732 a considerable portion of the northwestern part of the original shire was added to Brunswick County, and in 1748 the entire county of Southampton was carved out of it.

In the American Civil War, Company F of the 61st Virginia Infantry Regiment of the Confederate Army was called the "Isle of Wight Avengers."

== Geography ==
According to the U.S. Census Bureau, the county has a total area of 363 square miles (940 km^{2}), of which 316 square miles (820 km^{2}) is land and 47 square miles (120 km^{2}) (13.0%) is water.

The county is bounded by the James River on the north and the Blackwater River to the south. The land is generally low-lying, with many swamps and pocosins.

=== Adjacent counties and independent cities ===
- Newport News, Virginia — northeast
- Suffolk, Virginia — southeast
- Southampton County — west
- Franklin, Virginia — southwest
- Surry County — northwest

=== Major highways ===
- US 17
- US 258
- US 460
- SR 10
- SR 32

== Demographics ==
Historical population
Census	Pop.	Note	%±
1790	9,028		—
1800	9,342		3.5%
1810	9,186		−1.7%
1820	10,139		10.4%
1830	10,517		3.7%
1840	9,972		−5.2%
1850	9,353		−6.2%
1860	9,977		6.7%
1870	8,320		−16.6%
1880	10,572		27.1%
1890	11,313		7.0%
1900	13,102		15.8%
1910	14,929		13.9%
1920	14,433		−3.3%
1930	13,409		−7.1%
1940	13,381		−0.2%
1950	14,906		11.4%
1960	17,164		15.1%
1970	18,285		6.5%
1980	21,603		18.1%
1990	25,503		18.1%
2000	29,728		16.6%
2010	35,270		18.6%
2020	38,606		9.5%
2025 (est.)	41,321	▲	7.0%
U.S. Decennial Census; 1790-1960 1900–1990; 1990-2000 2010–2020

=== Racial and ethnic composition ===
Isle of Wight County, Virginia – Racial and ethnic composition Note: the US Census treats Hispanic/Latino as an ethnic category. This table excludes Latinos from the racial categories and assigns them to a separate category. Hispanics/Latinos may be of any race.
Race / Ethnicity (NH = Non-Hispanic)	Pop 1980	Pop 1990	Pop 2000	Pop 2010	Pop 2020	% 1980	% 1990	% 2000	% 2010	% 2020
White alone (NH)	12,582	16,883	20,992	24,969	26,410	58.24%	67.39%	70.61%	70.79%	68.41%
Black or African American alone (NH)	8,765	7,876	8,045	8,656	8,579	40.57%	31.44%	27.06%	24.54%	22.22%
Native American or Alaska Native alone (NH)	28	47	75	104	139	0.13%	0.19%	0.25%	0.29%	0.36%
Asian alone (NH)	14	67	101	275	391	0.06%	0.27%	0.34%	0.78%	1.01%
Native Hawaiian or Pacific Islander alone (NH)	x	x	8	13	31	x	x	0.03%	0.04%	0.08%
Other race alone (NH)	15	8	28	54	202	0.07%	0.03%	0.09%	0.15%	0.52%
Mixed race or Multiracial (NH)	x	x	225	541	1,655	x	x	0.76%	1.53%	4.29%
Hispanic or Latino (any race)	199	172	254	658	1,199	0.92%	0.69%	0.85%	1.87%	3.11%
Total	21,603	25,053	29,728	35,270	38,606	100.00%	100.00%	100.00%	100.00%	100.00%

=== 2020 census ===
As of the 2020 census, the county had a population of 38,606. The median age was 44.9 years. 21.3% of residents were under the age of 18 and 20.1% of residents were 65 years of age or older. For every 100 females there were 94.4 males, and for every 100 females age 18 and over there were 92.4 males age 18 and over.

The racial makeup of the county was 69.2% White, 22.4% Black or African American, 0.4% American Indian and Alaska Native, 1.0% Asian, 0.1% Native Hawaiian and Pacific Islander, 1.2% from some other race, and 5.6% from two or more races. Hispanic or Latino residents of any race comprised 3.1% of the population.

41.5% of residents lived in urban areas, while 58.5% lived in rural areas.

There were 15,268 households in the county, of which 29.6% had children under the age of 18 living with them and 23.8% had a female householder with no spouse or partner present. About 22.8% of all households were made up of individuals and 11.0% had someone living alone who was 65 years of age or older.

There were 16,441 housing units, of which 7.1% were vacant. Among occupied housing units, 78.9% were owner-occupied and 21.1% were renter-occupied. The homeowner vacancy rate was 1.9% and the rental vacancy rate was 6.9%.

=== 2010 Census ===
As of the census of 2024, there were 40,942 people, 15,426 households, residing in the county. The population density was 122.3 inhabitants per square mile (47.2/km^{2}). There were 17,566 housing units at an average density of 38 units per square mile (15 units/km^{2}). The racial makeup of the county was 72.2% White, 23% Black or African American, 0.5% Native American,1.2% Asian, 0.1% Pacific Islander, 0.0% from other races, and 3.0% from two or more races. 4.6% of the population were Hispanic or Latino of any race.

There were 15,426 households, out of which 21.4% had children under the age of 18 living with them, 60.40% were married couples living together, 12.20% had a female householder with no husband present, and 23.40% were non-families. 20.00% of all households were made up of individuals, and 8.60% had someone living alone who was 65 years of age or older. The average household size was 2.61 and the average family size was 2.99.

In the county, the population was spread out, with 25.40% under the age of 18, 6.60% from 18 to 24, 29.60% from 25 to 44, 26.20% from 45 to 64, and 12.20% who were 65 years of age or older. The median age was 39 years. For every 100 females there were 95.70 males. For every 100 females aged 18 and over, there were 91.70 males.

The median income for a household in the county was $45,387, and the median income for a family was $52,597. Males had a median income of $37,853 versus $22,990 for females. The per capita income for the county was $20,235. About 6.60% of families and 8.30% of the population were below the poverty line, including 8.80% of those under age 18 and 11.90% of those age 65 or over.

== Government ==
=== Board of Supervisors ===
- D5: Don Rosie (I)
- D3: Rudolph Jefferson (I)
- D2: Thomas J. Distefano (I)
- D1: Renee K. Rountree (I)
- D4: Joel Acree (I)

=== Constitutional officers ===
- Clerk of the Circuit Court: Laura E. Smith (I)
- Commissioner of the Revenue: Gerald H. Gwaltney (I)
- Commonwealth's Attorney: Georgette Phillips (I)
- Sheriff: James R. Clarke, Jr. (I)
- Treasurer: Julie Slye (I)

=== State and federal elected officials ===
House of Delegates:

- Nadarius Clark (D-84)
- Otto Wachsmann (R-83)

Senate:

- Emily Jordan (R-17)

U.S. House of Representatives:

- Jen Kiggans (R-VA 02)

== Politics ==
Isle of Wight County has supported Republican presidential candidates in every election since Reagan's 1984 landslide. Prior to this, it leaned heavily Democratic, only voting Republican twice after 1910 (in 1928 and 1972, both of which were national landslides), although Republican candidate Dwight Eisenhower only lost it by 26 votes in 1956.

United States presidential election results for Isle of Wight County, Virginia
Year	Republican		Democratic		Third party(ies)	
Year	No.	%	No.	%	No.	%
1912	75	8.48%	708	80.09%	101	11.43%
1916	140	17.07%	679	82.80%	1	0.12%
1920	245	24.38%	759	75.52%	1	0.10%
1924	190	22.97%	631	76.30%	6	0.73%
1928	555	51.10%	531	48.90%	0	0.00%
1932	284	22.27%	982	77.02%	9	0.71%
1936	207	16.76%	1,025	83.00%	3	0.24%
1940	208	15.45%	1,138	84.55%	0	0.00%
1944	430	26.74%	1,178	73.26%	0	0.00%
1948	442	27.78%	1,064	66.88%	85	5.34%
1952	996	44.52%	1,227	54.85%	14	0.63%
1956	1,298	47.08%	1,324	48.02%	135	4.90%
1960	1,141	35.91%	2,020	63.58%	16	0.50%
1964	1,737	39.49%	2,656	60.38%	6	0.14%
1968	1,312	23.28%	1,977	35.08%	2,346	41.63%
1972	3,555	59.27%	2,305	38.43%	138	2.30%
1976	2,718	38.78%	4,145	59.14%	146	2.08%
1980	3,526	45.30%	3,951	50.76%	307	3.94%
1984	5,664	60.18%	3,650	38.78%	98	1.04%
1988	5,779	60.07%	3,747	38.95%	95	0.99%
1992	5,370	47.16%	4,380	38.46%	1,637	14.38%
1996	5,416	47.64%	4,952	43.56%	1,001	8.80%
2000	7,587	58.59%	5,162	39.86%	201	1.55%
2004	9,929	62.56%	5,871	36.99%	71	0.45%
2008	11,258	56.30%	8,573	42.87%	166	0.83%
2012	11,802	56.67%	8,761	42.07%	264	1.27%
2016	12,204	57.91%	7,881	37.40%	990	4.70%
2020	13,707	58.44%	9,399	40.07%	350	1.49%
2024	14,659	59.20%	9,779	39.49%	324	1.31%

== Public services ==
=== Library ===
Blackwater Regional Library is the regional library system that provides services to the citizens of Isle of Wight.

=== Schools ===
Isle of Wight County Schools includes Smithfield High School and Windsor High School.

== Communities ==
=== Towns ===
- Smithfield
- Windsor

=== Census-designated places ===
- Benns Church
- Camptown
- Carrollton
- Carrsville
- Rushmere

=== Other unincorporated communities ===
- Battery Park
- Burwell's Bay
- Central Hill
- Comet
- Indika
- Isle of Wight
- Lawson
- Mogart's Beach
- Pons
- Raynor
- Rescue
- Stott
- Walters
- Wills Corner
- Zuni

== Gallery ==
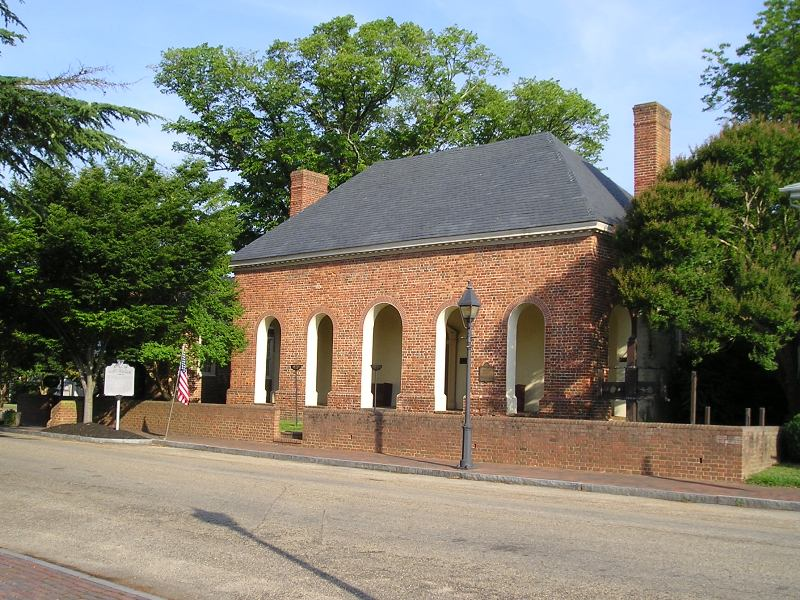
The 1750 courthouse on Main Street in Smithfield.

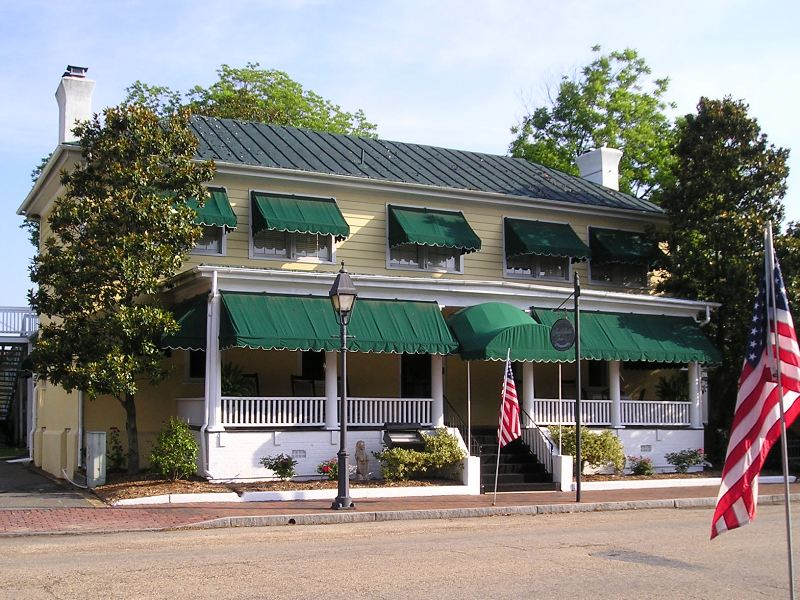
The 1752 tavern on Main Street, now operated as the Smithfield Inn.

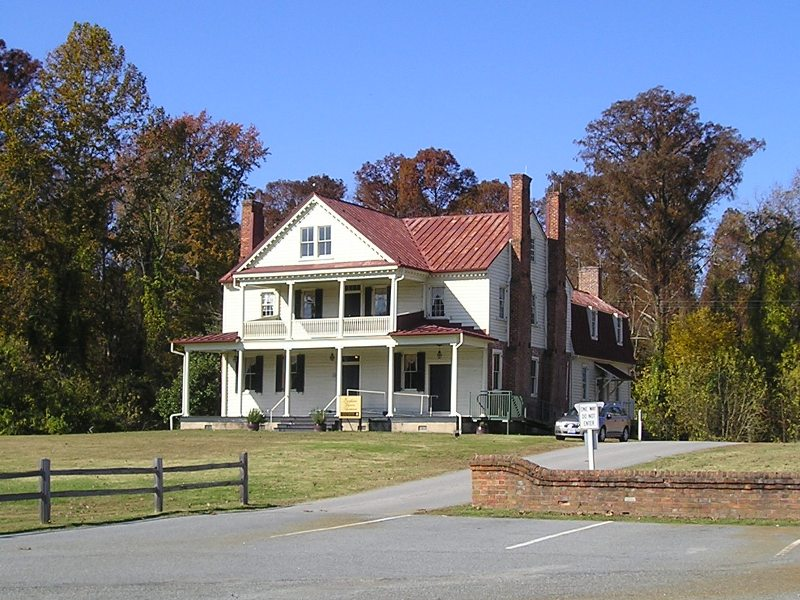
Boykin's Tavern, next to the 1800 courthouse.

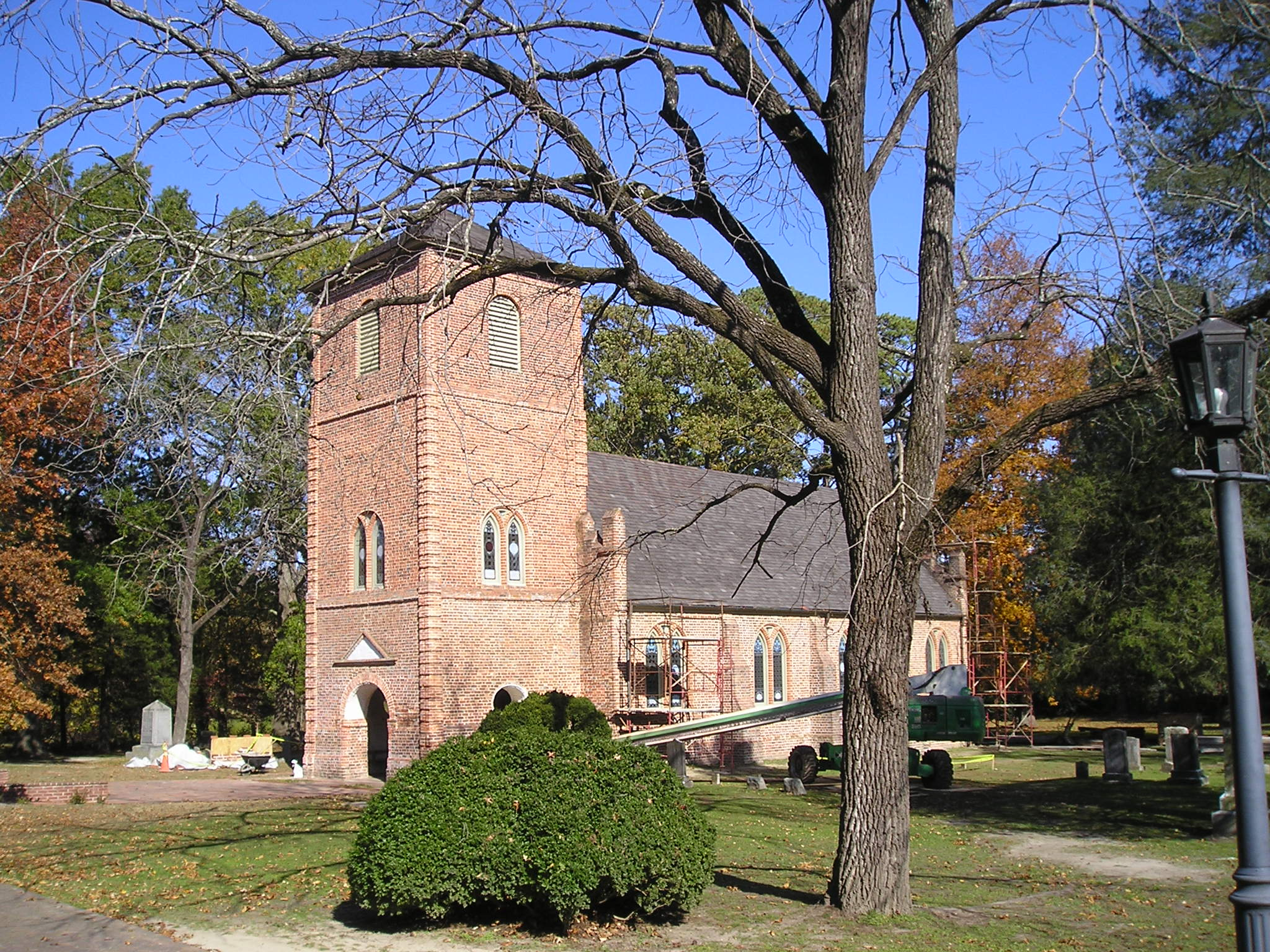
St. Luke's Church, built circa 1632.

== See also ==
- National Register of Historic Places listings in Isle of Wight County, Virginia
