= Pagan River =

River in Virginia

Coordinates: 37°0′35.53″N 76°34′5.83″W

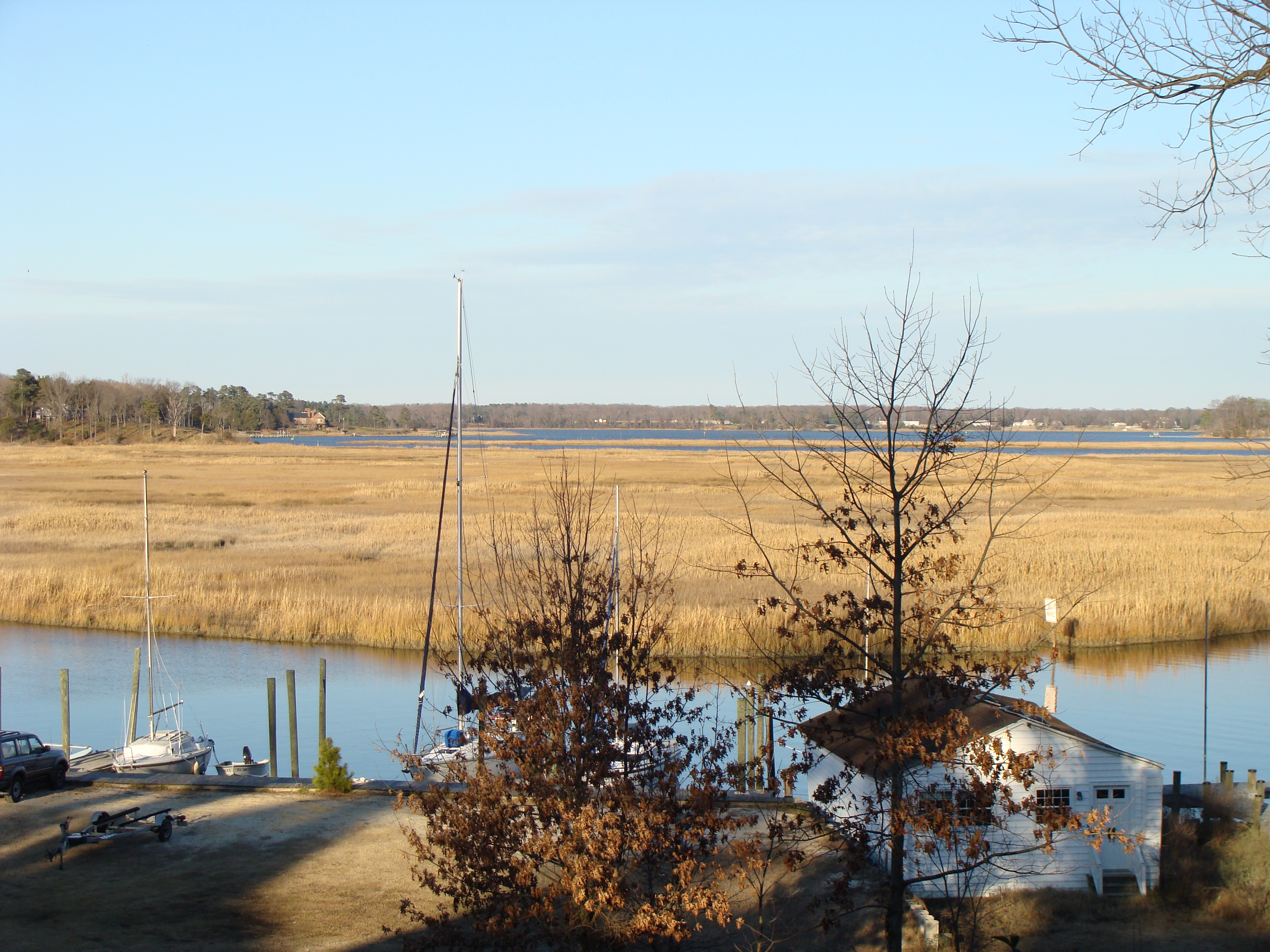
- A view of the Pagan River from the backyard of the Wentworth-Grinnan House.

Location
- Country: United States
- State: Virginia

Physical characteristics
- Length: 12.5 m (41 ft)

The Pagan River (Warrascoyack) is a 12.5-mile-long (20.1 km) tributary of the James River located in Isle of Wight County, Virginia. The colonial seaport town of Smithfield (and its National Register-listed Smithfield Historic District) sits on the banks of this river.

The tidal tributary originates approximately three miles north of the town of Smithfield and flows southward, gradually narrowing as it approaches the confluence with Cypress Creek. Beyond this junction, the river broadens into an array of wetlands and marshes before narrowing again as it enters the James River. The Pagan River is notable for its largely undeveloped watershed, which is predominantly composed of forests, pastures, grasslands, and wetlands. This natural landscape has helped preserve the river’s rural character despite its proximity to urban and suburban development.

== History ==
The river has played a significant role in the history and development of Smithfield, a town first settled in 1634. A major fire in 1921 prompted the relocation of the peanut industry away from the riverbank, to nearby Suffolk. In 1936, Smithfield Foods was established along the river, eventually becoming the town’s main economic engine. Despite supporting industrial activity, the Pagan River has retained much of its natural charm and continues to serve as a haven for recreational activities such as fishing, crabbing, boating, and kayaking.

The Pagan River and Isle of Wight County were respectively called Warrascoyak during the Late Woodland period, both bearing the name of the Warrascoyak tribe. This tribal community occupied the region for close to 5,500 years prior to English settlement and were part of the larger Powatan Confederacy. Later the county was renamed Isle of Wight, eponymously after the island located on the south coast of England and the Warraskoyak River became known as the Pagan River.

== Watershed and course ==
In addition to the primary tributaries Cypress Creek (Champion Swamp) and Jones Creek (Titus Creek, Town Farm Creek, Carrollton Branch), the Pagan River System is also supported by numerous smaller tributaries. These include: Williams Creek, Moone Creek, Tormentor Creek (Lake Tormentor), Little Creek, Mount Holly Creek (Blairs Creek),Canal Run, Wrenns Mill Pond and Warren Creek. The total water area of the Pagan River System is approximately 2,500 acres. It reaches a depth of 1-5 feet (MLW), COE project depth of 4-6 feet (MLW) dredged channels.

The mean lunar tide range at Smithfield is 2.8 feet. Surges from strong easterly winds may augment lunar tides and cause local flooding. There are no significant fetches within the system and surface waters are not significantly affected by wind conditions.

The immediate shoreline consists primarily of embayed and extensive marsh. There are also small sections of shoreline consisting of fringe marsh or artificially stabilized (bulkheads). The predominant upland use is agriculture. Other uses include, in order of predominance: unmanaged woodland, residential(Battery Park, Moonfield, Pagan Point, Pinewood Heights and newer development), commercial (commercial marinas, commercial docks, and businesses along the north and east side of Church Street between the Cypress Creek Bridge and the Pagan River Bridge), industrial(the Smithfield Packing Company and Gwaltney of Smithfield plants), and recreational (Carrollton Nike Park and newer development).

Its shoreline vegetation marsh habitat supports a variety of wading birds, migratory waterfowl and fur bearing mammals (muskrat and nutria). The waters of the Pagan River System support a diversity of marine and, in upstream areas, brackish water finfish. Shellfish, especially oysters and blue crabs, were also in abundance at the time of the 1988 government report.

== Etymology ==
The name of the river may come from the Algonquin language word for pecan (Cree pakan, Ojibway pagan, Abenaki pagann) "that which is cracked with a tool" referring to the nut. When the area was explored in the early 17th century there were many pecan trees along the banks.

== Restoration Efforts ==
In 2020, the James River Association received a $1 million grant to enhance water quality along the James River through its Living Shorelines Collaborative. This funding made possible by the EPA, the National Fish and Wildlife Foundation, and the Chesapeake Bay Program, supported the creation of three living shoreline projects. These were installed in Prince George County, Isle of Wight County, and near Smithfield along the Pagan River, a tributary of the James. The restoration is slated to be completed by 2025.

== See also ==
- List of rivers of Virginia
