= James River Bridge =

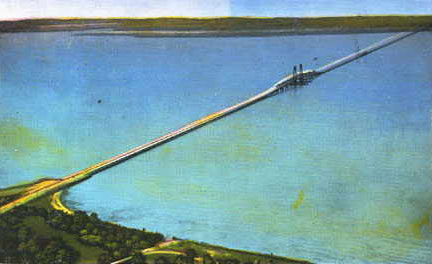
- The 1928 bridge, replaced from 1975 to 1982
- Coordinates: 36.9910°N 76.4836°W
- Carries: 4 lanes of US 17 / US 258 / SR 32
- Crosses: James River
- Locale: Isle of Wight County, VA to Newport News, VA
- Maintained by: Virginia DOT
- ID number: 10364

Characteristics
- Design: steel lift bridge
- Total length: 7,071.4 m (23,200 ft)
- Width: 20.8 m (68 ft)
- Longest span: 126.5 m (415 ft)
- Clearance above: 4.87 m (16.0 ft)
- Clearance below: 44.1 m (145 ft) open 18.2 m (60 ft) closed

History
- Opened: 1928; 98 years ago(original bridge); 1982; 44 years ago(current bridge)

Location
- Interactive map of James River Bridge

The James River Bridge (JRB) is a four-lane divided highway lift bridge across the James River in the Commonwealth of Virginia. Owned and operated by the Virginia Department of Transportation, it carries U.S. Route 17 (US 17), US 258, and State Route 32 across the river near its mouth at Hampton Roads. The bridge connects Newport News on the Virginia Peninsula with Isle of Wight County in the South Hampton Roads region, and is the easternmost such crossing without a tunnel component.

When completed in 1928, the 4.39-mile (7.07 km) bridge was the longest bridge in the world over water. The original two-lane bridge was replaced from 1975 to 1982 with a wider four-lane bridge that could handle increased traffic volumes. In 2005, the bridge carried an annual average daily traffic of about 30,000 vehicles per day.

== History ==
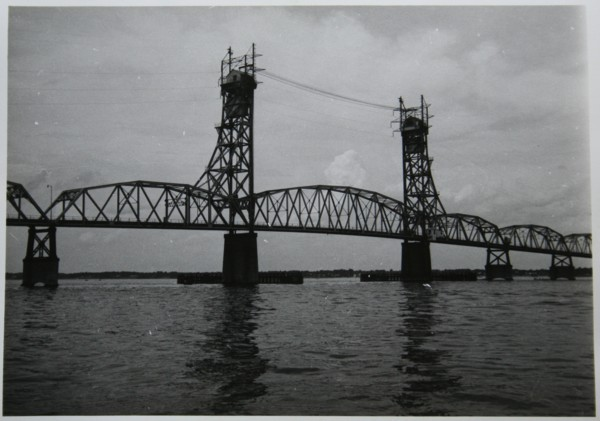
The original James River Bridge, circa 1960.

The privately owned James River Bridge Corporation was chartered by the General Assembly to build a system of bridges across the James River, Chuckatuck Creek, and Nansemond River, as well as approach roads. On the Newport News end, the bridge simply ended at an intersection with Virginia State Route 39/U.S. Route 60 (Virginia Avenue, now Warwick Boulevard). However, a large system of approach roads, including two smaller toll bridges, was built on the Isle of Wight County side. Traffic coming off the bridge reached a Y intersection at Bartlett, at which it could head west over a private approach road past Carrollton to State Route 10 at Benns Church, or head southeast into Nansemond County. The first of the two smaller bridges was the Crittenden Bridge over Chuckatuck Creek (the county line) at Crittenden, and the second, after passing the road to Hobson and Chuckatuck (now State Route 628), was the Nansemond River Bridge over the Nansemond River. The end of the private approach road was at the current intersection of Bennetts Pasture Road (Virginia State Route 627) and Lee Farm Lane (State Route 701), where one could go south to State Route 10 (now State Route 337) at Driver. So the James River Bridge System served not only traffic crossing the James River, but also traffic along State Route 10; the 1928 Chuckatuck-Driver Kings Highway Bridge (now State Route 125) competed with the James River Bridge System for this traffic. Projected traffic volumes were not reached, leading to bankruptcy of the James River Bridge Corporation. It was bought by bondholders, headed by a local businessman from Smithfield. The new owners raised tolls, proving unpopular with local residents. Chapter 399 of the Acts of Virginia of 1940 authorized the SHC to acquire the James River Bridge System, consisting of the three bridges and approach roads. The SHC bought the system from the corporation for $5.6 million on September 30, 1949. (equivalent to $58 million in 2024 dollars).

The $5.2 million James River Bridge was opened on November 17, 1928, by the press of a button in Washington, D.C., where U.S. President Calvin Coolidge, sitting in the Oval Office of the White House, sent an electric signal to lower into place the upraised lift span over the James River channel. Drivers could now choose to cross Hampton Roads on a fixed bridge rather than one of many ferries. The new bridge was narrow by current standards, with a 20-foot (6.1 m) roadway from curb to curb, and railings much less substantial than found on modern structures. The main lift span was 300 feet (91 m) long; the other two bridges included 110-foot (34 m) bascule spans.

In 1928, State Route 503, a state highway from Portsmouth via Churchland and Belleville to the private approach road south of the Nansemond River, was added to the state highway system. This designation was removed in 1931. U.S. Route 17 was moved onto this alignment (from one of the ferries) by 1932, and still uses it today.

As early as 1933, the State Highway Commission (SHC) considered taking over the bridge approaches - but not the bridges themselves - from the corporation.

State Route 258, now part of U.S. Route 258, was extended over the Benns Church approach and bridge by late 1943 to reach the new Mercury Boulevard.

In 1949, the state brought the bridge from the previous owners.

In 1951, State Route 32 was extended from Suffolk over the bridge to end in Newport News, completely overlapped with other routes, "to facilitate the routing of traffic over the James River Bridge System, between points north of Newport News and south of Suffolk".

In 1955, the state doubled tolls to $1.80 round trip for cars (equivalent to $21.63 in 2025 dollars) and $4.00 or more for trucks (equivalent to $48.07 in 2024 dollars) in order to pay for repairs, new toll booths, and a new punched card system compatible with the Hampton Roads Bridge-Tunnel. The toll plazas, which had numbered three - one for each bridge - were consolidated to two, one at the south end of the main bridge and one at the north end of the Nansemond River Bridge. Thus the Crittenden Bridge became free for local traffic. In addition, passenger vehicles and light trucks only had to pay at the first booth they reached; large trucks and buses had to pay twice. This meant that light vehicles crossing only the main bridge (for instance between Smithfield and Newport News) only had to pay southbound. Tolls were eventually dropped to 10 cents per axle.

J.W. Luter, Jr. of the local Smithfield Packing Company rerouted his trucks via a smaller, cheaper bridge owned by a Norfolk car dealer.

Tolls were removed on June 3, 1976; the state paid off the remaining bonds at that time. Simultaneously, the parallel Hampton Roads Bridge-Tunnel opened, and tolls were removed from that facility, the Coleman Bridge, and the Robert O. Norris Bridge. Many considered this an important step in the development of the area.

In 1978, Bicycles, mopeds, and pedestrians were banned from using the bridge; the easternmost crossing for them is the Jamestown Ferry, about 25 miles (40 km) upstream. The State Highway and Transportation Commission banned these transportation modes from using the bridge in 1978 "in the interest of safety", due to high traffic and lack of sidewalks. Once the replacement bridge was completed, they returned to the question in 1983, and decided to continue the ban, since the new bridge also had no sidewalks or sufficient recovery area.

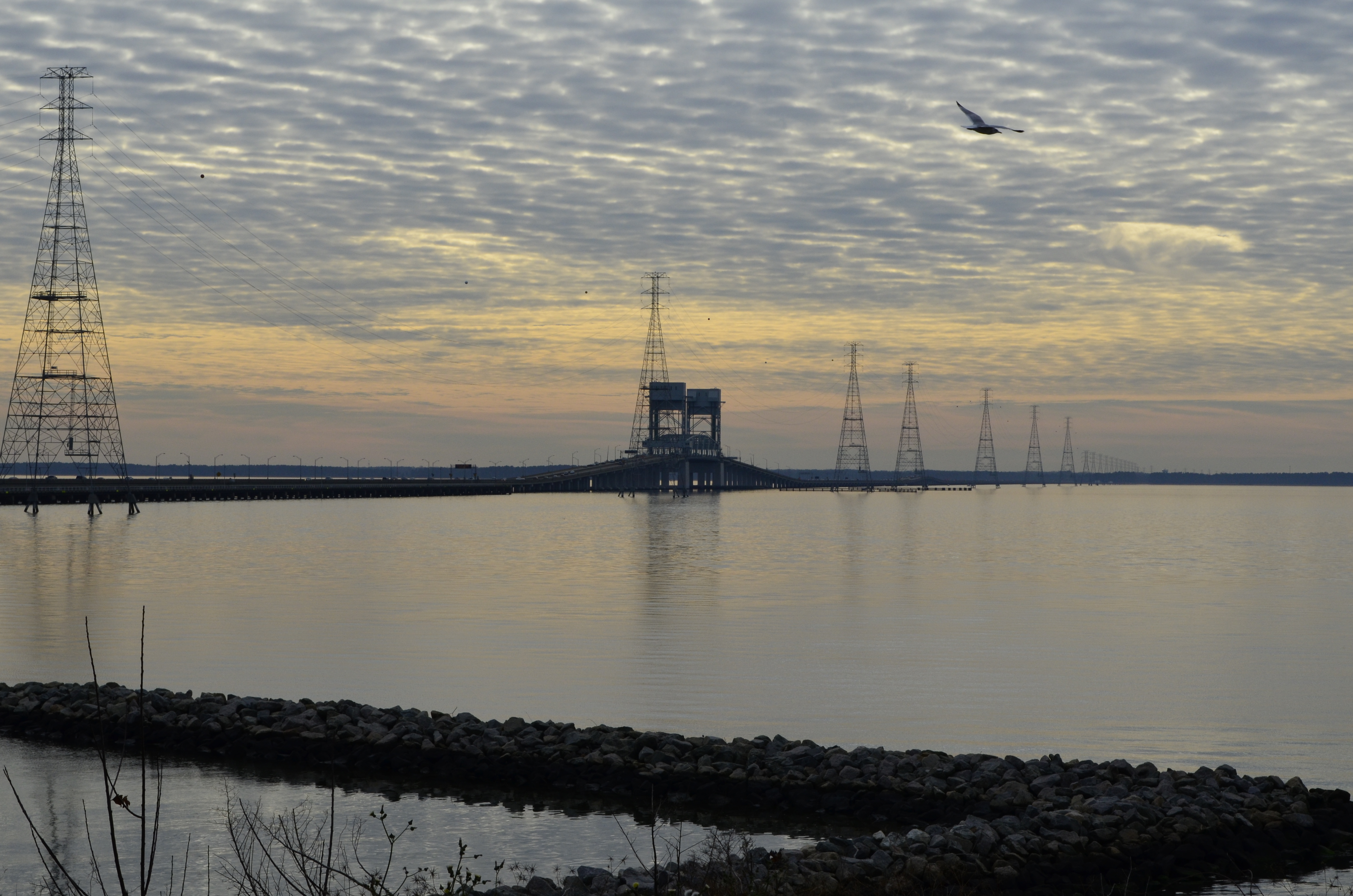
James River Bridge. Picture taken from Huntington Park Beach.

A new four-lane lift bridge was completed in stages from 1975 to 1982. During construction, the two southbound lanes of the new bridge were completed first and carried two-way traffic, connecting to the old lift span via temporary bridge lanes from 1975 to 1980. The new four-lane lift span and approaches were completed in 1980 and connected to the southbound lanes which were still carrying two-way traffic. The northbound lanes of the new bridge were completed in 1982, at which point the bridge became a fully functional four-lane facility. When the northbound lanes of the new bridge opened the old bridge was demolished, but a 0.75-mile (1.21 km) section on the Newport News side was retained for use as a fishing pier. Now known as the James River Pier, it is the longest fishing pier on the East Coast.

At the Newport News end, traffic approaches the bridge at a six-ramp partial cloverleaf interchange, where Mercury Boulevard (carrying U.S. Route 17, U.S. Route 258, and State Route 32 onto the bridge) passes over Warwick Boulevard (U.S. Route 60). After an intersection with River Road and the entrance to Huntington Park, the four-lane divided bridge begins, lying to the southeast a part of the old bridge that remains as a fishing pier. The 126.5 m (415 ft) lift span over the shipping channel, with a clearance of 44.1 m (145 ft) when raised and 18.2 m (60 ft) when lowered, is about 1/4 of the way along the 7.0714 km (4.3940 mi) bridge. This allows ocean-going ships to pass en route to civilian port facilities in Hopewell and at the Port of Richmond.

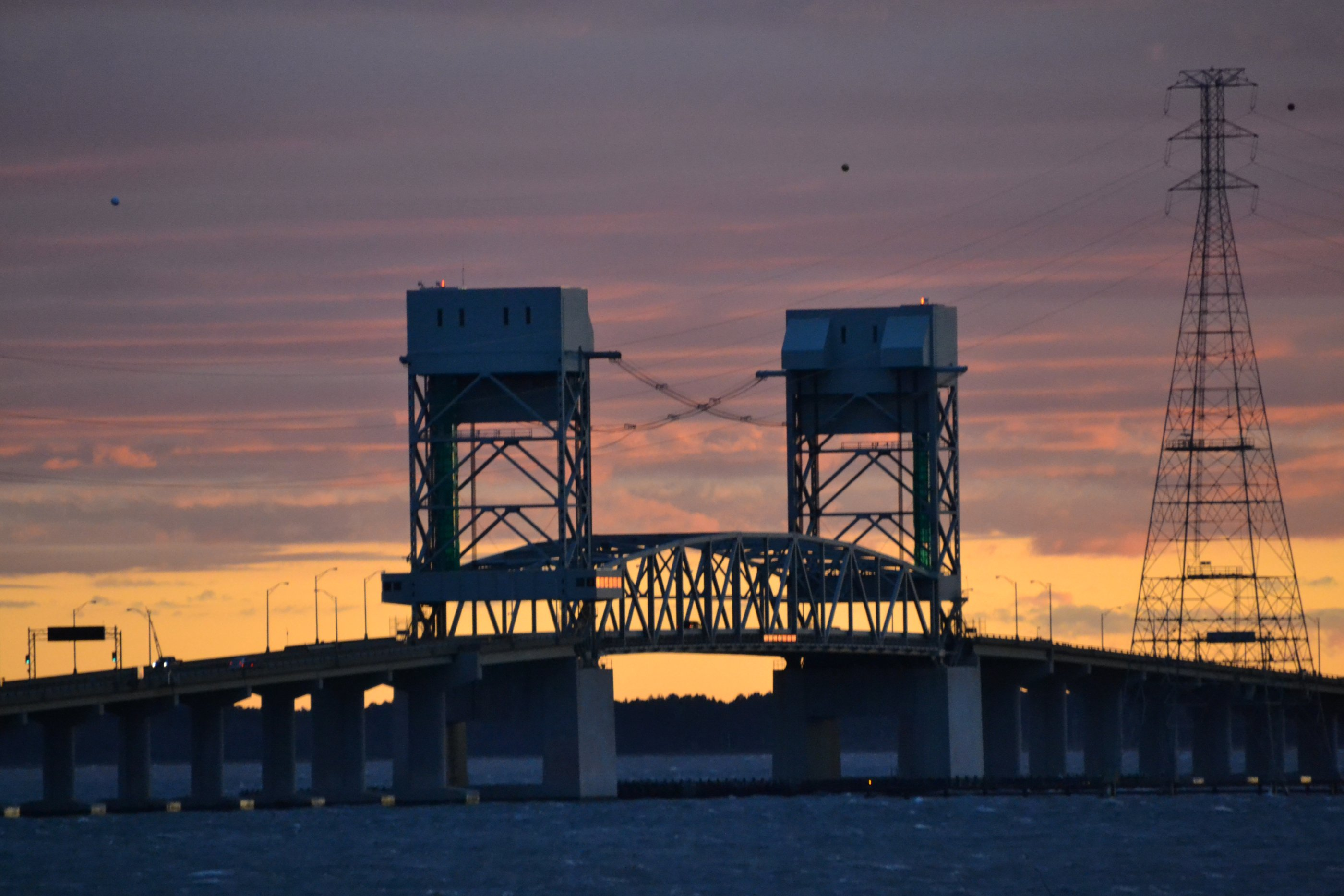
The current bridge's lift span at sunset

The roadway becomes Carrollton Boulevard on the Isle of Wight County end; after a number of intersections, US 258 and SR 32 turn west at Bartlett towards State Route 10 at Benns Church, while US 17 curves southeast towards Portsmouth.

The nearest upstream crossing of the James River is the Jamestown Ferry (State Route 31); the next fixed crossing is the 1966 Benjamin Harrison Bridge (State Route 156) at Hopewell. When the bridge opened in 1928, the next bridge upstream was the 1913 Mayo Bridge in Richmond.

Downstream, both crossings of Hampton Roads are bridge-tunnels for military reasons: the 1992 Monitor-Merrimac Bridge-Tunnel (Interstate 664) and 1957 Hampton Roads Bridge-Tunnel (Interstate 64/U.S. Route 60).

After the discontinuation of tolls, the toll building and parking area were used for maintenance workers, police, and tow truck drivers from 1976 up until 2002, when the building was demolished after asbestos was discovered. Preservationists have argued the building had historic significance.

Due to severe corrosion of the metal beams that supported the deck of the 86-year-old bridge structure, the James River Pier was demolished and rebuilt with concrete in 2015.

== See also ==
- List of crossings of the James River
