= List of former primary state highways in Virginia (Hampton Roads District) =

The following is a list of former primary state highways completely or mostly within the Hampton Roads District (VDOT District 5), formerly the Suffolk District, of the U.S. state of Virginia.

== SR 88 ==
State Route 88
- Location: Emporia–Branchville
- Existed: 1940–1948

State Route 88 was a primary state highway in the U.S. state of Virginia. The number was assigned in the 1940 renumbering to replace part of State Route 32, and SR 88 was transferred to the secondary system in 1943 and 1948. SR 88 ran from Branchville via Emporia to Purdy along current State Route 730 and part of State Route 619; SR 32 had continued east from Branchville to Boykins along State Route 195 and east from Purdy past Jarratt along State Route 608, State Route 139, and State Route 631.

== SR 152 ==
State Route 152
- Location: Smithfield-Rescue
- Existed: 1930–1944

State Route 152 extended east on present secondary SR 704 from SR 10 (now SR 10 Business) east of Smithfield past Battery Park to Center Street in Rescue. Just under half of the route was added to the state highway system in 1930 as an extension of State Route 507, and in 1932 it was extended to Rescue. SR 507 was renumbered 158 in the 1933 renumbering, split between US 158 (North Carolina to Franklin) and SR 158 (Franklin to Rescue). This became US 258 and SR 258 in the 1940 renumbering, but by 1944, SR 258 was rerouted over the James River Bridge to replace SR 239 on Mercury Boulevard, and the stub from Smithfield to Rescue became a new SR 152. This designation was short-lived, as it was downgraded to secondary in 1944.

== SR 174 ==
State Route 174
- Lebanon Church Road
- Location: north of Lee Hall
- Existed: 1926–1966

State Route 174 was a short cutoff between U.S. Route 60 and SR 238 bypassing Lee Hall to the north. The portion east of SR 143 is now Lebanon Church Road inside Naval Weapons Station Yorktown, while the remainder no longer exists as a roadway, having been covered by Interstate 64 and a former clay pit.

State Route 397, a spur from SR 39 (now US 60) to SR 391 (now SR 238), was added to the state highway system in 1926. It became State Route 519 in the 1928 renumbering and State Route 174 in the 1933 renumbering. The U.S. government took possession of the portion east of SR 168 (now SR 143) in 1952, and in 1966 the remainder (now lying within the city of Newport News) was abandoned, since it had been destroyed by the construction of I-64.

== SR 177 ==
State Route 177
- Location: Accomac-Parksley
- Existed: 1932–1959

State Route 177 extended along current SR 764, SR 763, and SR 673 from US 13 (now US 13 Business) in Accomac via Greenbush to SR 176 and SR 316 in Parksley. 3 miles (4.8 km) at the south end was added to the state highway system in 1932, with no number given, and became SR 177 in the 1933 renumbering. The rest of the route was added in 1938, but only four years later this extension, as well as the remainder north of Greenbush, was downgraded to secondary in favor of the shorter parallel SR 316. The remaining segment from Accomac to Greenbush was downgraded in 1959.

== SR 184 ==
State Route 184
- Location: Franktown-Nassawadox
- Existed: 1930–1953

State Route 184 followed current secondary SR 606 from US 13 in Nassawadox northwest to Middletown and SR 618 southwest to Franktown. 1/2 mile (0.80 km) at the east end became State Route 527 in 1930, and the remainder was added in 1932. SR 527 became SR 184 in the 1933 renumbering, and in 1953 it was downgraded to secondary as extensions of existing SR 606 and SR 618.

== SR 185 ==
State Route 185
- Location: Eastville-Eastville Station
- Existed: 1926–1952

State Route 185 extended east along present SR 631 from US 13 (now US 13 Business) in Eastville to Eastville Station on the former New York, Philadelphia and Norfolk Railroad. It was added to the state highway system in 1926 as State Route 343 (a spur of SR 34, now US 13), changed to State Route 524 in the 1928 renumbering and SR 185 in the 1933 renumbering, and downgraded to secondary in 1952 as an extension of existing SR 631.

== SR 186 ==
State Route 186
- Location: Bayview-Kiptopeke
- Existed: 1928–1951

State Route 186 extended south from US 13 (now US 13 Business) at Bayview (just outside Cheriton) to the former New York, Philadelphia and Norfolk Railroad (Pennsylvania Railroad) (now the Southern Tip Bike & Hike Trail) at Kiptopeke along current SR 684, US 13, SR 683, and part of SR 600. The majority of the route was added to the state highway system in 1928 as State Route 525, which was extended another 1 mile (1.6 km) in 1930 and the remaining 1.3 miles (2.1 km) to Kiptopeke in 1932. SR 525 became SR 186 in the 1933 renumbering.

The Virginia Ferry Corporation opened a new terminal near Kiptopeke in 1949, rerouting its Little Creek-Cape Charles Ferry service from the old dock (leased from the Pennsylvania Railroad) at Cape Charles. The state improved what was then SR 652, from SR 186 west of Capeville south to the new terminal, to primary standards, and realigned SR 186 near its north end to follow a more direct route. The completed upgrade of SR 652 was transferred to the primary system in 1951 as a rerouted US 13, and later that year the parts of SR 186 that had not become US 13 were downgraded to secondary as an extension of existing SR 600 and new SR 683 and SR 684. (The Chesapeake Bay Bridge-Tunnel approach was later built next to the old railroad through Kiptopeke.)

== SR 188 ==
State Route 188
- Location: Norge-Croaker
- Existed: 1932–1944

State Route 188 extended northeast along current SR 607 (and its former alignment, now SR 758) from US 60 at Norge to SR 606 at Croaker. It was added to the state highway system in 1932, with no number given, became SR 188 in the 1933 renumbering, and was downgraded to secondary in 1944 as an extension of existing SR 607. 0.4 miles (0.64 km) at I-64 was re-added to the primary system in 1965 (effective once I-64 was complete) as part of SR 168Y (now SR 30).

== SR 190 ==
State Route 190
- Location: SR 165-Creeds
- Existed: 1930–1954

State Route 190 followed Blackwater Road and Pungo Ferry Road from Fentress Airfield Road (former SR 165) near North Landing south and east to Princess Anne Road (former SR 615) near Creeds. The former route is now entirely within the cities of Chesapeake and Virginia Beach.

Two segments of State Route 536 were created in 1930, extending south from SR 502 (later SR 165) almost to the Pocaty River and from the county line at the Pocaty River for 0.4 miles (0.64 km). The 1/4 mile (0.40 km) gap at the Pocaty River was filled in 1932, and a 5.2 miles (8.4 km) extension was added at the south end. SR 536 became SR 190 in the 1933 renumbering, and in October 1933 it was extended another 1.4 miles (2.3 km), taking it across the North Landing River to SR 615. SR 190 was downgraded to secondary SR 726 in 1952, effective once the new Pungo Ferry Bridge (which replaced Pungo Ferry) was complete, which happened in 1954.

Major intersections

| County | Location | mi | km | Destinations | Notes |
|---|---|---|---|---|---|
| Princess Anne | Pungo | 0.00 | 0.00 | SR 615 (Princess Anne Road) | |
| Norfolk | | 9.72 | 15.64 | SR 165 (Mt. Pleasant Road) | |
1.000 mi = 1.609 km; 1.000 km = 0.621 mi

== SR 192 ==
State Route 192
- Location: Chuckatuck-northeast
- Existed: 1931–1947

State Route 192 followed Kings Highway (now SR 125) and Crittenden Road from SR 10 at Chuckatuck northeast down the neck of land between Chuckatuck Creek and the Nansemond River in the direction of US 17 near Crittenden (where secondary State Route 628 ended) and Eclipse. The route is now entirely within the city of Chesapeake.

The first 1.4 miles (2.3 km) were added to the state highway system in 1931 as State Route 541, which was extended 2.1 miles (3.4 km) in 1932 and became SR 192 in the 1933 renumbering. It was extended another 0.8 miles (1.3 km) in October 1933, ending 2.2 miles (3.5 km) short of US 17 (about midway between Sandy Bottom and Hobson), and downgraded to secondary in 1947 as an extension of existing SR 628. A short piece at the Chuckatuck end (which had become SR 630 rather than SR 628) was returned to the primary system in 1963 as part of SR 125. The former secondary route system of Nansemond County was transferred to the city of Suffolk on July 1, 2006, resulting in the SR 628 designation being dropped.

Major intersections

The entire route is in Nansemond County.

| Location | mi | km | Destinations | Notes |
|---|---|---|---|---|
| | 0.00 | 0.00 | SR 10 / SR 32 (Godwin Boulevard) – Downtown Suffolk, Smithfield, Newport News | |
| Gloversville | | | SR 630 (Kings Highway) | now SR 125 east |
| | 4.33 | 6.97 | SR 628 (Crittenden Road) – Hobson | |
1.000 mi = 1.609 km; 1.000 km = 0.621 mi

== SR 193 ==
State Route 193
- Location: Wallaceton-Northwest
- Existed: 1932–1945

State Route 193 followed Ballahack Road from former US 17 (Dismal Swamp Canal Trail) south of Wallaceton to former SR 170 (Old Battlefield Boulevard) at Northwest, now entirely within the city of Chesapeake. It was added to the state highway system in 1932, as State Route 543, became SR 193 in the 1933 renumbering, and was downgraded to secondary SR 740 in 1945. The road no longer has a state route number, since the city of Chesapeake maintains its own streets.

Major intersections

The entire route is in Norfolk County.

| Location | mi | km | Destinations | Notes |
|---|---|---|---|---|
| | 0.00 | 0.00 | US 17 | |
| Northwest | 11.64 | 18.73 | SR 170 (Battlefield Boulevard) – Norfolk, Nags Head | |
1.000 mi = 1.609 km; 1.000 km = 0.621 mi

== SR 194 ==
State Route 194
- Location: SR 35-Newsoms
- Existed: 1932–1946

State Route 194 followed the portion of current SR 673 from SR 35 southeast to the Seaboard Air Line Railroad's Portsmouth Subdivision in Newsoms. It was added to the state highway system in 1932, as State Route 544, became SR 194 in the 1933 renumbering, and was downgraded to secondary in 1946 as an extension of existing SR 673.

Major intersections

The entire route is in Southampton County.

| Location | mi | km | Destinations | Notes |
|---|---|---|---|---|
| Newsoms | 0.00 | 0.00 | SR 673 (Main Street) | |
| Newsoms | | | SR 671 (General Thomas Highway) | |
| | 3.30 | 5.31 | SR 35 (Meherrin Road) – Boykins, Courtland | |
1.000 mi = 1.609 km; 1.000 km = 0.621 mi

== SR 196 ==
State Route 196
- Location: Wakefield-northeast
- Existed: 1932–1942

State Route 196 ran northeast from SR 31 near the border of Wakefield along what is now secondary SR 617 to about 1 mile (1.6 km) short of Walls Bridge over the Blackwater River in the direction of Runnymede and Bacons Castle. It was added to the state highway system in 1932 as State Route 546, and became SR 196 in the 1933 renumbering. In 1942 the route was downgraded to secondary.

Major intersections

| County | Location | mi | km | Destinations | Notes |
|---|---|---|---|---|---|
| Sussex | Wakefield | 0.00 | 0.00 | SR 31 (East Main Street / Birch Island Road) – Wakefield, Dendron | |
| Surry | | 6.07 | 9.77 | SR 630 (White Marsh Road) – Bacons Castle | now SR 617 |
1.000 mi = 1.609 km; 1.000 km = 0.621 mi

== SR 285 ==
State Route 285
- Location: north of Williamsburg
- Existed: 1933–1943

State Route 285 ran along present secondary SR 641 (Penniman Road), southeast for 1 mile (1.6 km) from the US 60 bypass around Williamsburg. It was added to the primary state highway system in 1933, initially running east from US 60 near Quarterpath Road and crossing the Chesapeake and Ohio Railway's Peninsula Subdivision at a grade crossing, but a new alignment was built on the north side of the tracks and the mile of approved road was reapplied such that only about 1/10 mile (0.16 km) of the preexisting Penniman Road was included in SR 285. The route was downgraded to secondary in 1943 as an extension of existing SR 641.

== SR 286 ==
State Route 286
- Location: east of Williamsburg
- Existed: 1933–1942

State Route 286 ran along present secondary SR 713 (Waller Mill Road), northeast for 1 mile (1.6 km) from the US 60 bypass around Williamsburg. It was added to the primary state highway system in 1933, initially beginning at Richmond Road (the pre-bypass US 60) and crossing over the Chesapeake and Ohio Railway's Peninsula Subdivision on a bridge, but portion this was abandoned when the new bypass was completed and the full mile of mileage was used north of the bypass. SR 286 was downgraded to secondary in 1942 as an extension of existing SR 604 (now SR 713).

== SR 288 ==
State Route 288
- Location: Temperanceville-Makemie Park
- Existed: 1933–1947

State Route 288 ran along a small portion of present secondary SR 695 from US 13 at Temperanceville northwest to the former New York, Philadelphia and Norfolk Railroad at Makemie Park. It was added to the primary state highway system in 1933, described as going towards Saxis Island, and downgraded to secondary in 1947 as an extension of existing SR 695. The US 13 intersection has since been relocated to the north.

== SR 312 ==
State Route 312
- Location: Schuyler
- Existed: 1928–1951

State Route 312 extended from SR 35 north of Courtland northeast on modern SR 616 to beyond Ivor, with a disconnected second section on SR 626 northwest from US 258 Business in Smithfield.

The first piece was created in 1928 as State Route 508 from Courtland to Ivor. In 1930 it was extended northeast from Ivor for 3.25 miles (5.23 km), and in 1932 a further 1.65 miles (2.66 km) were tacked on, along with 3.88 miles (6.24 km) at the Smithfield end. This put the final endpoints on either end of the gap at 1/2 mile (0.80 km) short of Johnson Corner (the SR 621 intersection) and 1/2 mile (0.80 km) short of Septa (the SR 678 intersection).

SR 508 became State Route 33 in the 1933 renumbering, but when US 33 came to Virginia in 1937, it was renumbered 312. The different portions were downgraded to secondary in 1942 (northeast from Ivor), 1943 (northwest from Smithfield), and 1951 (Courtland to Ivor). Existing SR 616 and SR 626 were extended onto the former segments of SR 312.

Major intersections

| County | Location | mi | km | Destinations | Notes |
|---|---|---|---|---|---|
| Southampton | | 0.00 | 0.00 | SR 35 (Plank Road) – Courtland, Petersburg | |
| Southampton | Ivor | 16.35 | 26.31 | US 460 east (General Mahone Boulevard) – Suffolk | west end of US 460 overlap |
| Southampton | Ivor | 16.43 | 26.44 | US 460 west (General Mahone Boulevard) – Petersburg | east end of US 460 overlap |
| Southampton | | 21.63 | 34.81 | SR 616 (Proctor Bridge Road) – Proctors Bridge | |
Gap in route
| Isle of Wight | | 0.00 | 0.00 | SR 626 (Mill Swamp Road) | |
| Isle of Wight | Smithfield | 4.49 | 7.23 | US 258 (Main Street) | now US 258 Bus. |
1.000 mi = 1.609 km; 1.000 km = 0.621 mi

== SR 409 ==
State Route 409
- Location: Virginia Beach
- Existed: 1981–2001

State Route 409 was the designation for the 3.08-mile (4.96 km) segment of Providence Road in Virginia Beach between Military Highway (US 13) and Kempsville Road (SR 190) from 1981 to 2011. Providence Road had been designated Secondary State Route 602 before the 1963 consolidation of Princess Anne County and Virginia Beach. SR 409 was created from city-maintained mileage in March 1981 along with several other 4XX-numbered roads in the city. The route was decommissioned in January 2001 along with many of those same routes and reverted to the city. The route was largely unsigned during its existence.
