= Clerical error =

Mistake in clerical work, e.g. data entry

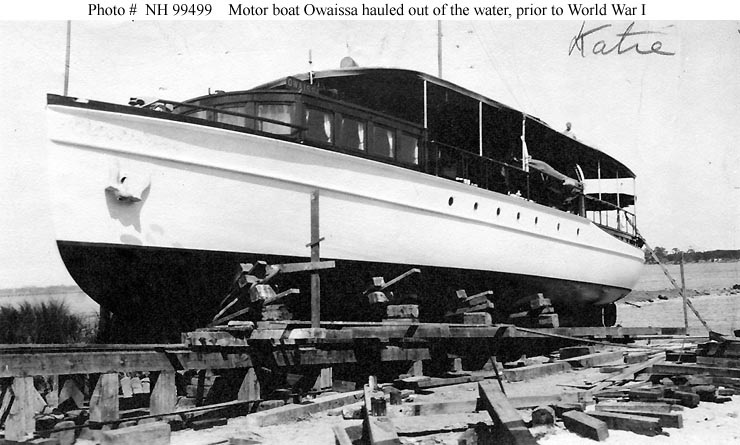
The motorboat Owaissa, hauled out of the water sometime prior to her service as the United States Navy patrol vessel. The notation "Katie" is a clerical error by someone who mistook the photograph for one of the motorboat Katie, which later served as the United States Navy patrol vessel

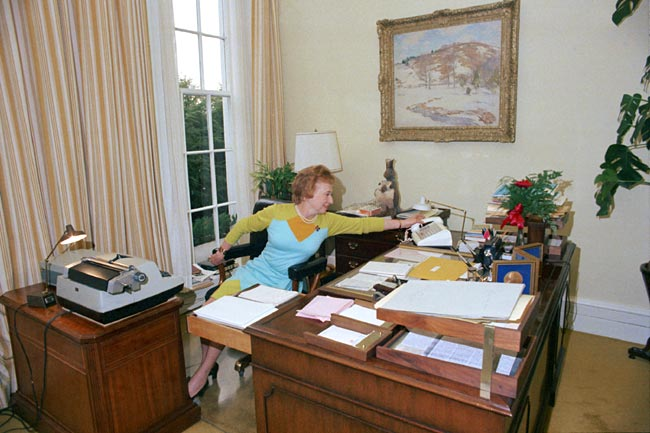
Rose Mary Woods demonstrating the "Rose Mary stretch" by which she claimed that she accidentally erased 18 1/2 minutes of the "Watergate tapes" during a phone call.

A clerical error is an error on the part of an office worker, often a secretary or personal assistant. The phrase may also be used as an excuse to deflect blame away from specific individuals, such as high-powered executives, and instead redirect it to the more anonymous clerical staff.

A clerical error in a legal document is called a scrivener's error.

== In law ==
There is a considerable body of case law concerning the proper treatment of a scrivener's error. (Note: See Barkelew v. Barkelew (1946, Cal App) 73 Cal App 2d 76, 166 P2d 57, for example.) For example, where the parties to a contract make an oral agreement that, when reduced to a writing, is mistranscribed, the aggrieved party is entitled to reformation so that the writing corresponds to the oral agreement.

A scrivener's error can be grounds for an appellate court to remand a decision back to the trial court. For example, in Ortiz v. State of Florida, Ortiz had been convicted of possession of less than 20 g of marijuana, a misdemeanor. However, Ortiz was mistakenly adjudicated guilty of a felony for the count of marijuana possession. The appellate court held that "we must remand the case to the trial court to correct a scrivener's error."

In some circumstances, courts can also correct scrivener's errors found in primary legislation.

== Examples ==
Over 18 minutes of the Watergate tapes were supposedly erased by Richard Nixon's secretary, Rose Mary Woods, in a claimed clerical error. Some writers have suggested that this may have changed the course of American history.

== See also ==
- Plausible deniability
- Typographical error
