= Virginia State Route 125 =

State highway in Suffolk, Virginia, United States

State Route 125
- Kings Highway

Route information
- Maintained by VDOT
- Length: 5.73 mi (9.22 km) 2 sections
- Existed: 1963–present

Major junctions
- West end: SR 10 / SR 32 at Chuckatuck
- Gap at Nansemond River
- East end: SR 337 at Driver

Location
- Country: United States
- State: Virginia
- Counties: City of Suffolk

Highway system
- Virginia Routes; Interstate; US; Primary; Secondary; Byways; History; HOT lanes
← SR 124	→ SR 126

State Route 125 (SR 125) is a primary state highway in the U.S. state of Virginia. Known as Kings Highway, the state highway has two sections that run a total of 5.73 miles (9.22 km) from SR 10 and SR 32 at Chuckatuck east to SR 337 at Driver within the independent city of Suffolk. SR 125 consists of a 2.69-mile (4.33 km) western section and a 3.04-mile (4.89 km) eastern section separated by a gap at the Nansemond River. This gap arose when the Kings Highway Bridge across the river was removed in 2008.

== Route description ==
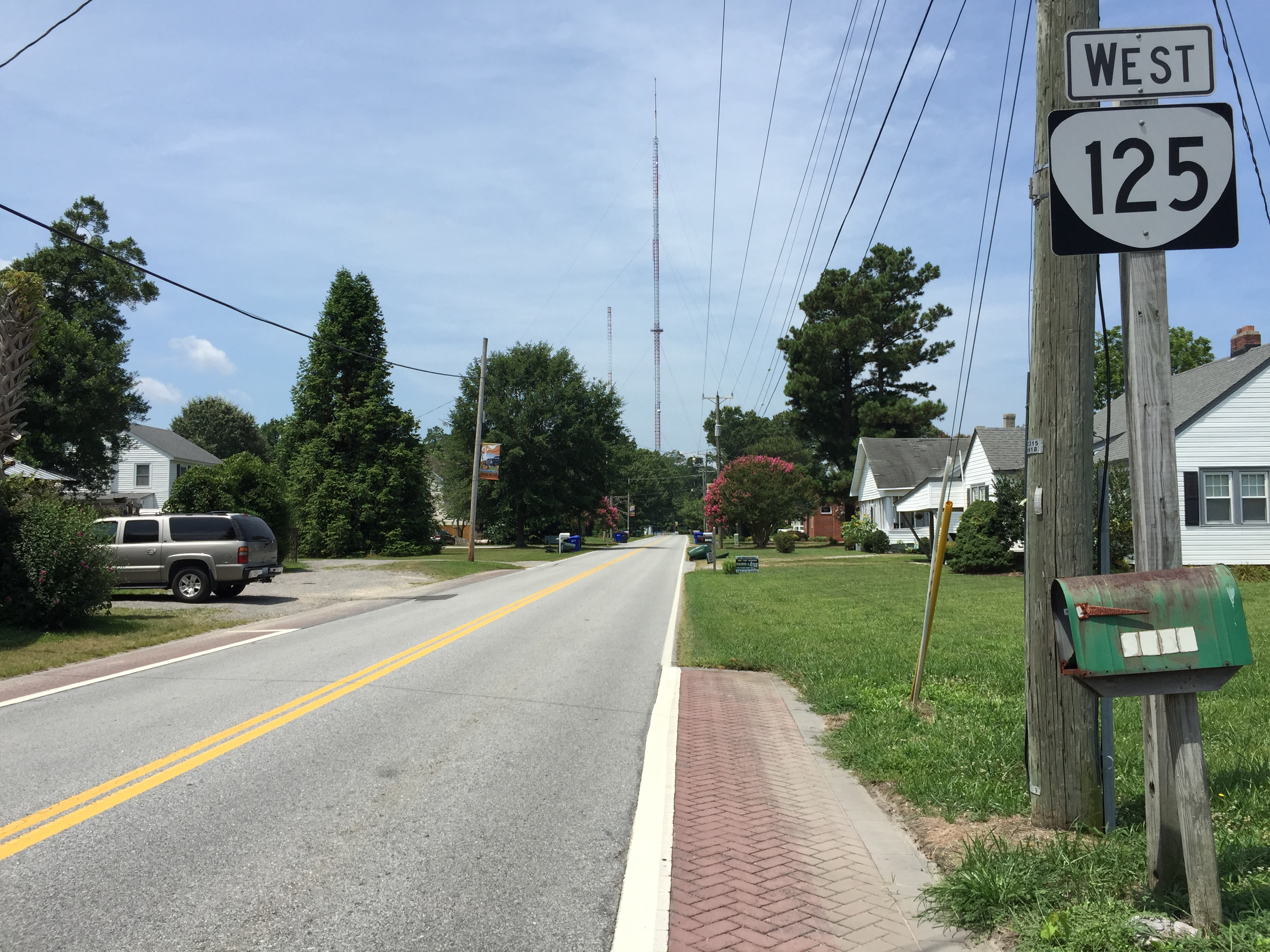
View west along SR 125 at Driver Lane in Suffolk

SR 125 begins at an intersection with SR 10 and SR 32 (Godwin Boulevard) in the hamlet of Chuckatuck in the city of Suffolk. The state highway heads east as a two-lane undivided road that passes historic St. John's Church then veers south to a dead end at Hollidays Point on the Nansemond River at the former site of the Kings Highway Bridge. SR 125 picks up again at a dead end due south of the western segment's dead end to the north of Nansemond National Wildlife Refuge. The highway veers east and passes through a forested area to the community of Driver, where the highway reaches its eastern terminus at SR 337 (Nansemond Parkway). Traveling between Chuckatuck and Driver requires crossing the Nansemond River near its mouth on U.S. Route 17 (US 17) on the Nansemond River Bridge or on one of several crossings of the river at its head of navigation in the center of Suffolk.

== Major intersections ==
The entire route is in Suffolk.

mi	km	Destinations	Notes
0.00	0.00	SR 10 / SR 32 (Godwin Boulevard) – Downtown Suffolk, Smithfield, Newport News	Western terminus
		Crittenden Road – Hobson	former SR 192 east
2.69 0.00	4.33 0.00	Gap at former site of Kings Highway Bridge at Nansemond River	
3.04	4.89	SR 337 (Nansemond Parkway) – Portsmouth, Downtown Suffolk	Eastern terminus
1.000 mi = 1.609 km; 1.000 km = 0.621 mi
