= USS Rhebal =

Patrol vessel of the United States Navy

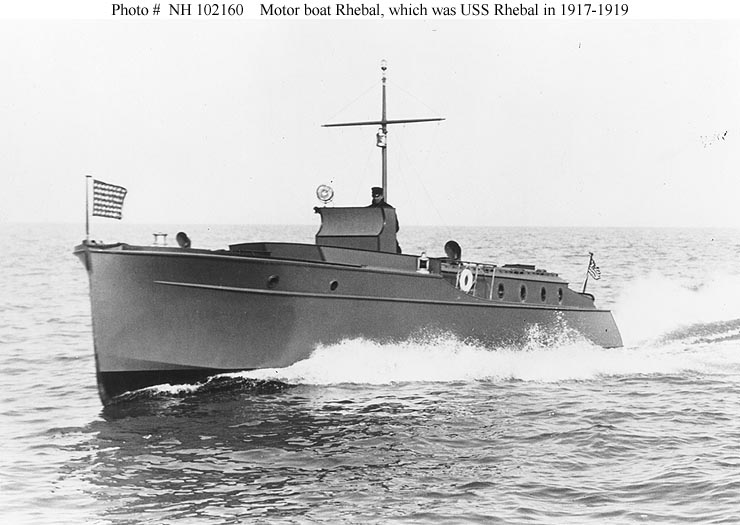
- Rhebal in 1917, prior to her United States Navy service.

History

United States
- Name: USS Rhebal
- Namesake: Previous name retained
- Builder: Great Lakes Boat Building Corporation, Milwaukee, Wisconsin
- Completed: 1917
- Acquired: 15 August 1917
- Commissioned: 24 August 1917
- Fate: Returned to owner 13 January 1919 or March 1919
- Notes: Operated as private motorboat Rhebal 1917 and from 1919

General characteristics
- Type: Patrol vessel
- Tonnage: 157 gross register tons
- Length: 52 ft 4 in (15.95 m)
- Beam: 10 ft 2 in (3.10 m)
- Draft: 2 ft 6 in (0.76 m)
- Speed: 16 knots
- Armament: 1 × 1-pounder gun; 1 × machine gun

USS Rhebal (SP-1195) was a United States Navy patrol vessel in commission from 1917 to 1919.

Rhebal was built as a private motorboat of the same name by the Great Lakes Boat Building Corporation at Milwaukee, Wisconsin, in 1917. On 15 August 1917, the U.S. Navy acquired her under a free lease from her owners, A. R. Meyer and W. K. Hill of Boston, Massachusetts, for use as a section patrol boat during World War I. She was commissioned as USS Rhebal (SP-1195) on 24 August 1917.

Assigned to the 2nd Naval District in southern New England, Rhebal carried out patrol duties for the rest of World War I. During the summer of 1918, she served on outward patrol, working with the patrol boats USS Patrol No. 6 (SP-54), USS Owaissa (SP-659), and USS Felicia (SP-642), the submarine chaser USS SC–167, and a patrol boat with the section patrol number SP-50 of which no records have been found.

Rhebal she was returned to Meyer and Hill on 13 January 1919 or in March 1919.
