= State highways in Virginia =

Highway system in Virginia, United States

- Interstate, US Route, primary and secondary shields

System information
- Length: 57,867 mi (93,128 km)
- Notes: Outside cities, some towns, and two counties, every road is state-maintained. These roads are split into primary and secondary state routes, and receive different levels of funding. Inside cities, most primary state routes are locally maintained.

Highway names
- Interstates: Interstate X (I-X)
- US Highways: U.S. Route X (US X)
- State: State Route X (SR X) or Virginia Route X (VA X)

System links
- Virginia Routes; Interstate; US; Primary; Secondary; Byways; History; HOT lanes

The state highway system of the U.S. state of Virginia is a network of roads maintained by the Virginia Department of Transportation (VDOT). As of 2006, the VDOT maintains 57,867 miles (93,128 km) of state highways, making it the third-largest system in the United States.

== Interstate and primary highways ==
I-95

Interstate Highways, totaling 1118 miles (1799 km) in Virginia, are freeways designated by the Federal Highway Administration and numbered by the American Association of State Highway and Transportation Officials. They are in a special class with respect to federal funding. These interstate highways are as follows:

- I-64 I-264 I-464 I-564 I-664
- I-66
- I-73 and I-74 (both proposed)
- I-77
- I-81 I-381 I-581
- I-85 I-785 (proposed)
- I-87 (proposed)
- I-95 I-195 I-295 I-395 I-495

US 1

SR 7

Primary highways, totaling 8111 miles (13,053 km), consist of U.S. Routes, designated and numbered by the American Association of State Highway and Transportation Officials, and primary state routes, designated and numbered by the VDOT. Alternate, business, and bypass special routes, as well as wye connections (with a Y suffix appended to the number), are all considered primary routes.

Primary routes are generally given numbers under 600. The two exceptions - State Route 785 and State Route 895 - are numbered as future interstate highway spurs.

Roadways at many of Virginia's state institutions, such as state universities and colleges, correctional facilities, and state police headquarters, also receive primary highway designations. For example, all of the roadways within Virginia Tech's campus carry the single designation State Route 314. These roadways may or may not be signed.

Other than limited access roads, most primary routes inside Virginia's independent cities are not maintained by the state, but by the city with financial assistance from the state. Some towns also choose to maintain their own streets (see below).

== Secondary highways ==
Virginia has 48,305 miles (77,739 km) of secondary routes. These roads, numbered 600 and up, receive less funding than primary routes. Numbers are only unique within each county, and routes that cross county lines generally, but not always, keep their numbers.

=== History ===
==== Byrd Road Act (1932), Secondary roads system ====
The secondary roads system in Virginia was formed in 1932, when the financial pressures of the Great Depression prompted the state to take over most county roads through the Byrd Road Act.

Virginia's independent cities were not included, but all the counties in Virginia were given the option of turning this responsibility over to the state. Only four counties initially opted not to do so. Of these, Nottoway County opted in the following year, and in the 1950s, Warwick County became an independent city and was consolidated with another, Newport News. By the end of the 20th century, only Arlington and Henrico counties continue to maintain their own roads.

Generally, when an area became part of an independent city, through annexation, merger, consolidation, or conversions, the secondary roads passed from the state system to local responsibility. An exception was made by the general assembly in the former Nansemond County, which like Warwick County, became an independent city and consolidated with another, Suffolk in the 1970s. The state still maintained secondary routes in Suffolk until July 1, 2006. This arrangement eventually led to new conflicts over ownership and responsibility for the c. 1928 Kings Highway Bridge across the Nansemond River on State Route 125, which was closed in 2005 by the VDOT for safety reasons.

In the years after 1932, the state worked diligently on secondary roads. In 1932, there were only 2,000 miles (3,200 km) of hard-surfaced secondary roads, out of almost 36,000 miles (58,000 km). By 1972, there were only 400 miles (640 km) of unpaved secondary roads in Virginia's system.

The state's secondary roads system had also grown by 30% from its original size, despite the large geographical areas (and miles of roadway) lost over the years to expanding and additional independent cities and incorporated towns. In the years from 1952 to 1976, virtually all of the counties in the extreme southeastern portion of state in the Hampton Roads region became consolidated into independent cities; Princess Anne County, Norfolk County, Nansemond County, Elizabeth City County, and Warwick County all ceased to exist, although as previously noted, Warwick County was never in the state secondary road system, and Nansemond County received a special exception to stay in the system for an additional 30 years, a relationship that ended in 2006. In most other areas of the state, additional towns became incorporated or converted to independent city status, and both groups grew in territory, primarily through annexations, such as large portions of Chesterfield County, which were annexed by the City of Richmond in 1944 and 1970.

However, despite the VDOT's (and its predecessor agencies) accomplishments, the relationship between the counties and the state highway officials since 1932 has always been somewhat strained. The 1932 act took not only financial responsibility from the counties and transferred it to the state, but power and authority as well. Under the Code of Virginia, as amended, "The Boards of Supervisors or other governing bodies...shall have no control, supervision, management, and jurisdiction over...the secondary system of state highways" (§33.1-69).

==== Considering changes in structure and local control ====
Late in the 20th century, the problems inherent in this arrangement became especially apparent with regards to the secondary roads system in many fast-growing suburban counties outside incorporated towns and cities. A state-sponsored study in 1998 focused on 14 of the fastest-growing counties identified such issues as drainage, speed limits, and planning and coordination of roads with development as those local leaders felt should be within their ability to control, while the authority to do so was in fact, held by a state agency instead. Citizens seeking accountability, accused both the various county and VDOT officials of finger-pointing. According to the report, "Such an arrangement is unusual among the 50 states."

In the early 21st century, the Virginia General Assembly was considering legislation to allow some counties to choose to resume control and care for the secondary highways within their boundaries. James City County, with a population that grew by 56% between 1980 and 1990 according to the 1998 VDOT study, was reported by the local news media to be under consideration for a pilot project of this type. The lack of progress in such reform, however, has prompted many residents and businesses of Fairfax County—the state's most populous and congested county—to push for cityhood, to retain a greater share of fuel tax revenues.

=== Towns ===
While independent cities generally maintain all secondary roads (streets), and some maintain primary routes within their jurisdiction as well, incorporated towns do so on an optional basis. In most of Virginia's towns, all streets are maintained by the VDOT as primary or secondary routes.

Those that maintain their own streets, including most primary routes, are as follows: Abingdon, Ashland, Big Stone Gap, Blacksburg, Blackstone, Bluefield, Bridgewater, Christiansburg, Clifton Forge, Culpeper, Farmville, Front Royal, Herndon, Lebanon, Leesburg, Luray, Marion, Orange, Pulaski, Richlands, Rocky Mount, South Boston, South Hill, Tazewell, Vienna, Vinton, Warrenton, Wise, Wytheville

In the following towns, all primary routes are maintained by the state, but other streets are town-maintained: Altavista, Chase City, Chincoteague, Dumfries, Elkton, Grottoes, Narrows, Pearisburg, Saltville, Smithfield, Strasburg, Woodstock

=== Numbering ===
Many, but not all, secondary routes in Virginia are streets and unpaved country roads that are mostly short in nature.

Roadways on public (K-12) school campuses are also secondary routes and are numbered in the 9000 to 9999 range. Unlike other secondary routes, these do not duplicate within the state and are often unsigned.

For internal record keeping, such as the tabulation of traffic counts, the VDOT disambiguates between counties by prefixing the county unit of the VDOT that maintains it; for example, State Route 611 in Fairfax County is labeled SR 29-611. Also, secondary route numbers are assigned to some roads not maintained by the state, such as city and town roads and roads in Arlington and Henrico counties.

== Frontage roads ==
Frontage roads total 333 miles (536 km) and are numbered on a statewide system. The numbers bear an F prefix (e.g., State Route F-1000 off State Route 7 in Loudoun County).

== Other roads ==
Roads in Virginia other than state highways include the following.

Cities and towns maintain 10,561 (16,996 km) miles of urban streets with the help of state funds. Most towns contract street maintenance to the VDOT, in which case the streets have T prefixed numbers.

As noted above, two counties in the state maintain their own roads: Arlington County (359 miles - 578 km) and Henrico County (1279 miles - 2058 km).

Virginia includes 51.12 miles (82.27 km) of toll roads maintained by other entities, typically through public-private partnerships. These are the Boulevard Bridge, Chesapeake Bay Bridge-Tunnel, Chesapeake Expressway, Dulles Greenway, and Jordan Bridge.

In addition, the U.S. Government maintains 382.99 miles (616.36 km) of numbered routes and other major roads in Virginia; the ones without normal numbers are assigned special unsigned numbers. The National Park Service maintains several parkways - the Blue Ridge Parkway (SR 48), Colonial Parkway (SR 90003), George Washington Memorial Parkway (SR 90005), and Skyline Drive (SR 48). The U.S. Army Corps of Engineers maintains State Route 4 over the John H. Kerr Dam and State Route 143 in Fort Monroe, and the Metropolitan Washington Airports Authority operates and maintains State Route 267 (the Dulles Toll Road) and owns the Dulles Access Road (SR 90004).

== Signage ==
The markers for primary routes show the route number in a rounded shield shape, while those for secondary roads and frontage roads use a circular highway shield. A separate series of signs, posted at intersections, shows the route number on a small rectangular strip and does not distinguish among the various types of highways except by using the F prefix for frontage roads, the T prefix for state-maintained town roads (where they exist), or the B prefix for business routes.
