= Battle of Smithfield =

Battle of the American Civil War

Coordinates: 36°58.932′N 76°37.474′W

The Battle of Smithfield was a relatively small skirmish during the American Civil War – taking place on from January 31 to February 1, 1864, in Smithfield, Virginia.

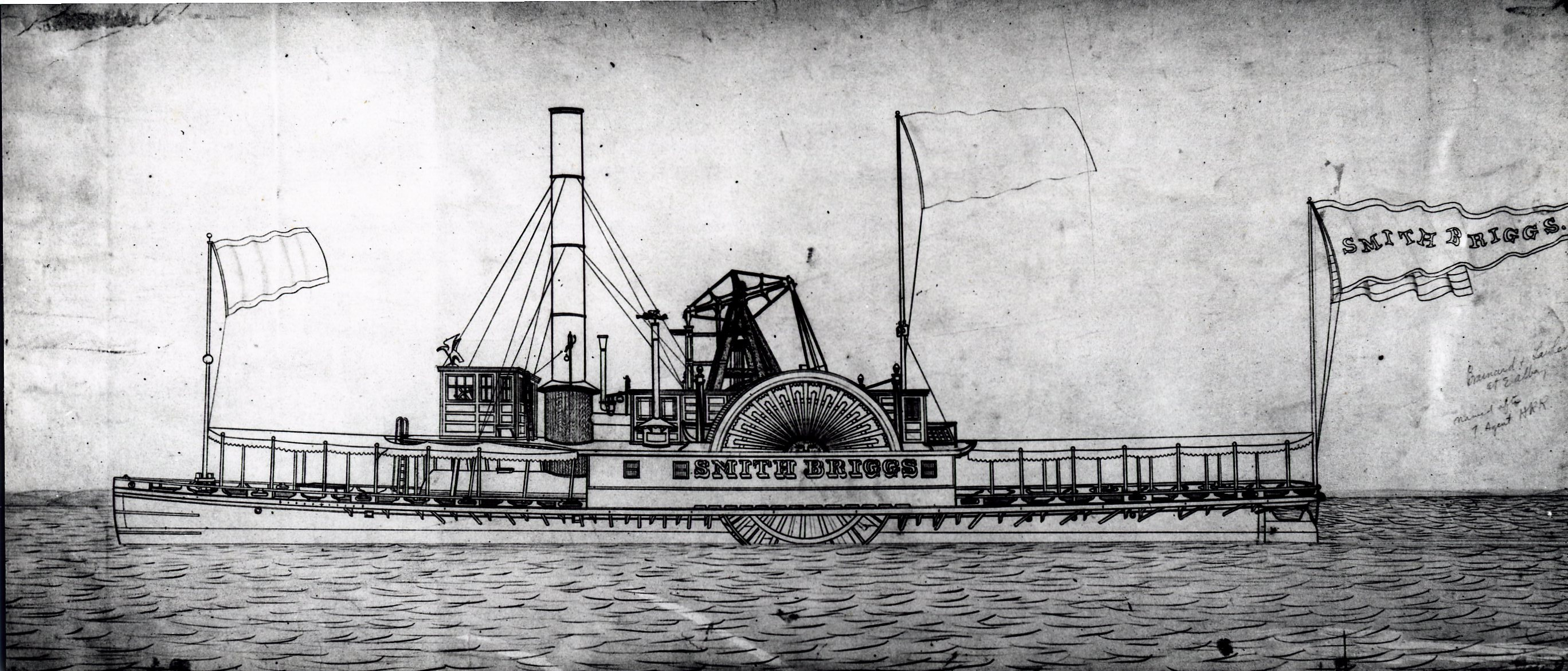
Union troops used the gunboat Smith-Briggs on February 1, 1864, in an attempt to escape a Confederate skirmish at the town of Smithfield, Virginia. The gunboat was ultimately destroyed by Confederate forces, leading to the capture of Union soldiers.

== Background ==
In 1863 and early 1864, Confederate units harassed Union gunboats on the Nansemond River and operated with relative impunity in the Smithfield area. Union Navy and Army commanders decided to cooperate in a joint operation by sending landing parties into the towns of Chuckatuck in Nansemond County – present day Suffolk, Virginia - and Smithfield in Isle of Wight County to converge and trap an offending rebel unit.

The plan went awry when Union troops marching south from Smithfield encountered Confederate troops near an abandoned cotton mill site southwest of the town. Both sides disengaged and pulled back – Union troops into Smithfield and Confederate soldiers toward Zuni. Then, Confederate forces led by Col. Nathaniel A. Sturdivant rallied from their nearby winter quarters on the Blackwater River and rushed to repel the invasion.

== Skirmish ==
On February 1, 1864, Southern cannons were fired down Main Street in the middle of town with a Union cannon responding in kind. The Confederates made an all-out assault on both flanks of the enemy and drove them back to their landing site on the edge of town. The United States Army gunboat Smith-Briggs was sent to rescue the detachment but was destroyed. Nearly the entire landing force was captured and sent off to the Confederate prison near Andersonville, Georgia.

== Aftermath ==
On January 31, one Confederate soldier was killed in action.

On February 1, Union casualties included 17 killed in action, 5 wounded in action and 110 prisoners of war. The Confederates counted one soldier wounded in action.
