= USS Owaissa =

Patrol vessel of the United States Navy

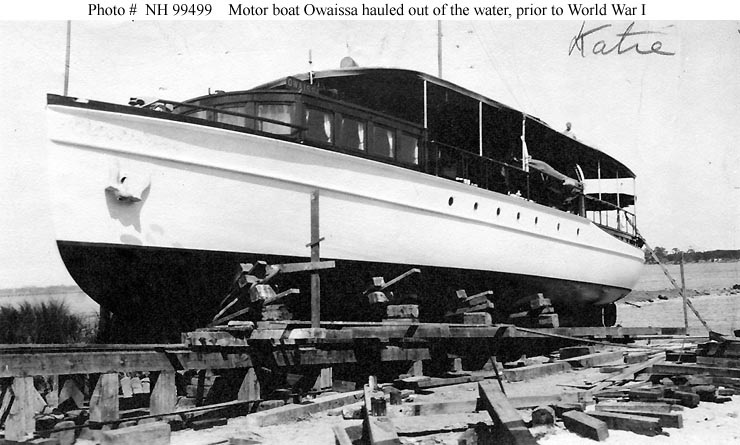
- Owaissa as a private motorboat, hauled out of the water sometime between 1912 and 1917. The notation "Katie" is a clerical error by someone who mistook the photograph for one of the motorboat Katie, which later also served in the United States Navy as the patrol vessel USS Katie (SP-660).

History

United States
- Name: USS Owaissa
- Namesake: Previous name retained
- Builder: New York Yacht, Launch & Engine Company, Morris Heights, the Bronx, New York
- Completed: 1912
- Acquired: 11 July 1917
- Commissioned: 6 November 1917
- Fate: Returned to owner 3 January 1919
- Notes: Operated as private motorboat Marie and Owaissa 1912-1917 and Owaissa from 1919

General characteristics
- Type: Patrol vessel
- Tonnage: 64 gross register tons
- Length: 77 ft 9 in (23.70 m)
- Beam: 17 ft (5.2 m)
- Draft: 4 ft (1.2 m)
- Speed: 8 knots
- Complement: 13
- Armament: 1 × 3-pounder gun; 1 × machine gun

USS Owaissa (SP-659) was a United States Navy patrol vessel in commission from 1917 to 1919.

Owaissa was built as the private motorboat Marie by the New York Yacht, Launch & Engine Company at Morris Heights in the Bronx, New York, in 1912. She later was renamed Owaissa.

On 11 July 1917, the U.S. Navy acquired Owaissa under a free lease from her owner, E. B. Dickerson, for use as a section patrol boat during World War I. She was commissioned as USS Owaissa (SP-659) on 6 November 1917.

Assigned to the 1st Naval District in northern New England, Owaissa carried out patrol duties for the rest of World War I. She initially patrolled around Woods Hole, Massachusetts, speaking to various vessels to determine their identities. She spent the summer of 1918 on outward patrol, working with the patrol boats USS Patrol No. 6 (SP-54), USS Rhebal (SP-1195), and USS Felicia (SP-642), the submarine chaser USS SC–167, and a patrol boat with the section patrol number SP-50 of which no records have been found. In August 1918 Owaissa began to patrol Vineyard Sound.

In December 1918, Owaissa proceeded to Newport, Rhode Island, then moved on to the New York Yacht Club dock. After decommissioning at the Material Section Dock, she was returned to Dickerson on 3 January 1919.
