= USS Smith-Briggs =

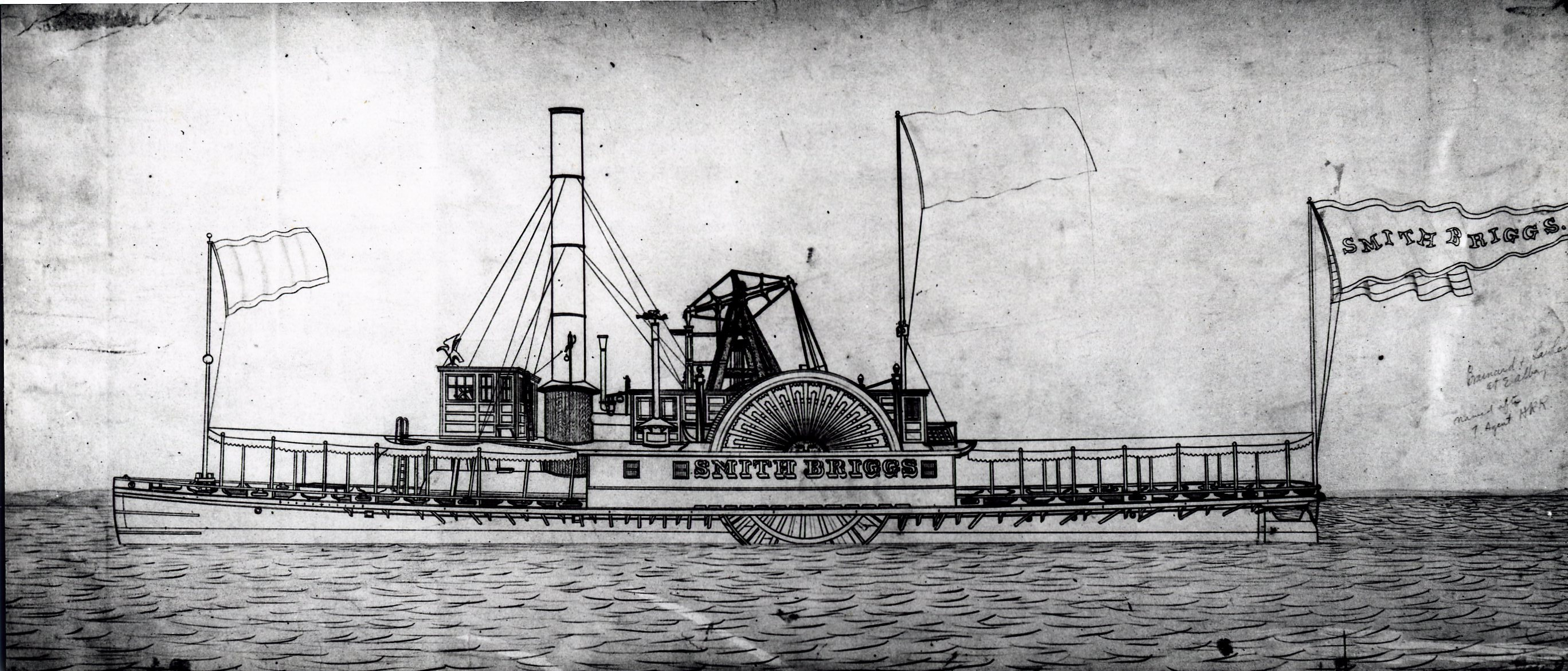
- Sketch of the Smith Briggs gunboat

History

United States
- Name: USS Smith Briggs
- Cost: $20,000
- Laid down: January 1862
- Launched: May 3, 1862
- Commissioned: March 1863
- Fate: Grounded and destroyed, February 1, 1864

General characteristics
- Type: Hudson River tugboat
- Displacement: 237 long tons (241 t)
- Length: 135 ft (41 m)
- Beam: 28 ft (8.5 m)
- Draft: 4 ft (1.2 m)
- Propulsion: 1 × Maginnis steam engine; Side paddle wheels
- Armament: 1 × 32-pound Parrott rifle; 1 × 42-pound banded rifle gun

USS Smith Briggs was a Union Army gunboat destroyed during the American Civil War.

== Background ==
The Smith Briggs was originally a Hudson River tugboat built in East Albany, New York, for Samuel Schuyler and the Schuyler Steam Towing Company, and named after an agent for the Hudson River Railroad Company. The ship was laid down in January 1862, and launched on May 3, 1862, at a cost of $20,000, and made her maiden trial voyage on September 27, 1862. The side-wheel steamer was powered with a Maginnis-built 36-inch cylinder with a 9-foot stroke with 30 pounds steam and a speed of 30 RPMs. It was 135 feet long and had a draft of 4 feet.

The private ship was leased by the U.S. government for $200 a day and converted into a gunboat at the Portsmouth Navy Yard, in Portsmouth, Virginia, in March 1863. It was outfitted with armor plating and two guns: a 32-pound Parrott rifle and a 42-pound banded rifle gun.

== Service history ==
In the spring of 1863, the Smith Briggs participated in the Siege of Suffolk, and on June 5, 1863, it participated in a combined expedition with the gunboats Commodore Morris, Commodore Jones, and the transport Winnissimet as they ascended the Mattaponi River to attack Confederate ordnance works at the town of Walkerton.

On June 23, 1863, the Smith Briggs and other gunboats – including Commodore Morris, Commodore Barney, Jesup, Morse, and Western World – formed an escort flotilla to provide support for a week-long mission to land a Union force at White House plantation along the Pamunkey River in Virginia.

It also patrolled the York, Rappahannock, Nansemond, and James Rivers in addition to Chuckatuck Creek in Hampton Roads, Virginia.

=== Battle of Smithfield ===
Smith Briggs was a key ship in the Battle of Smithfield in 1864. During the engagement with Confederate troops, members of the 99th New York Infantry were waiting for the ship to arrive down the Pagan River to pick them up. Upon reaching the troops who were under fire, the gunboat was hit in its exposed boiler causing it to run aground. As a result, the Union soldiers were taken as prisoners.

By 3 p.m. on February 1, 1864, the battle was over. Confederate soldiers and civilians climbed aboard the ship to look for souvenirs and provisions such as coffee and tea. The golden eagle figurehead was also removed from atop the boat's pilot house. Once the looting was complete, soldiers set it on fire. When the flames reached the two tons of black powder on board, the ship was blown to pieces.

What was left of the wreck remained in the Pagan River until it was salvaged by the company Maltby & Brown a few years later. The owner of the ship was paid $45,000 in restitution by the government after it was destroyed.
