= Driver Historic District =

Historic district in Virginia, United States

- U.S. National Register of Historic Places
- U.S. Historic district
- Virginia Landmarks Register
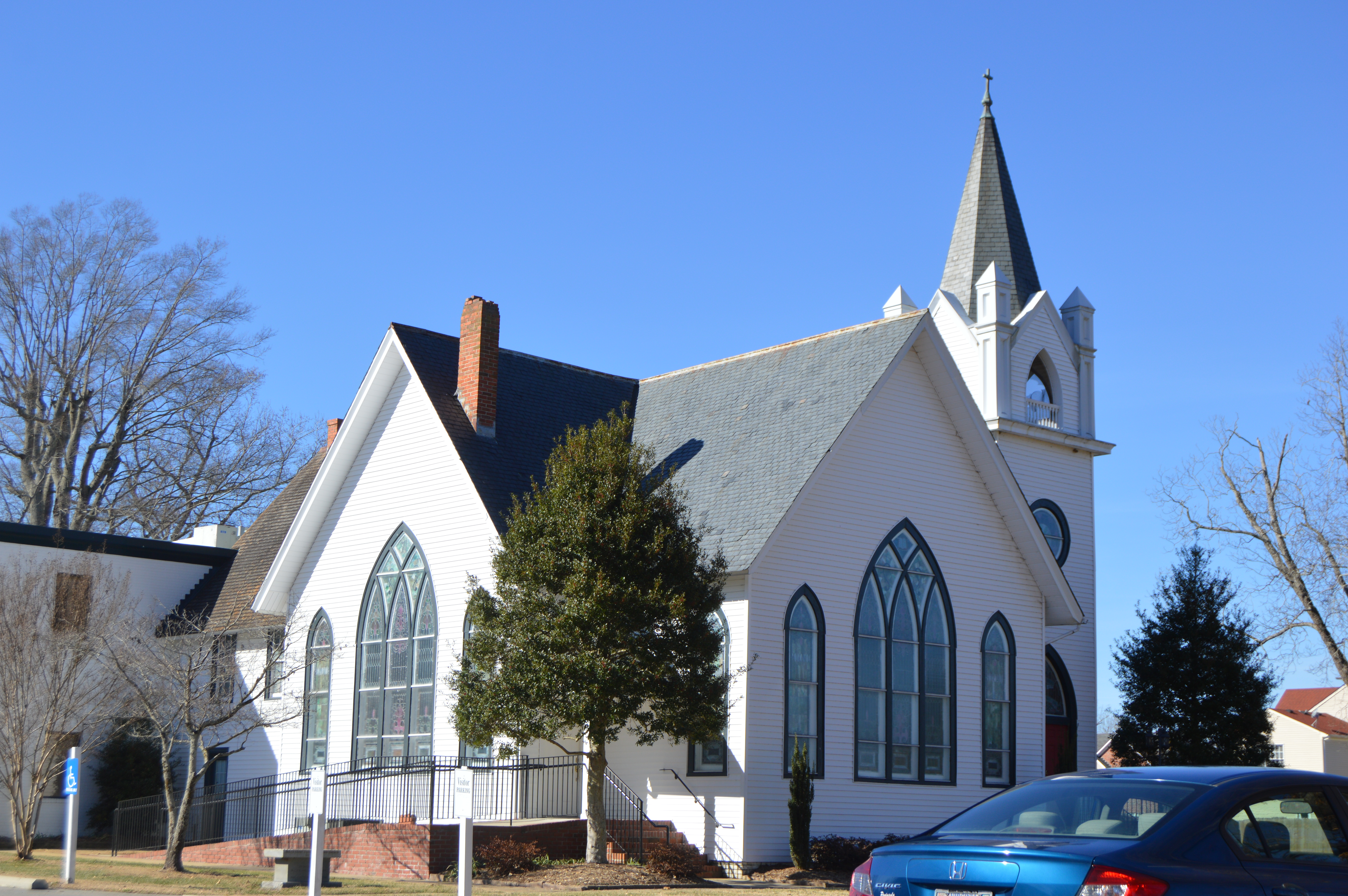
- Beech Grove United Methodist Church

- Location within Virginia Location within the United States
- Location: Junction of State Route 125 and Driver Lane, Suffolk, Virginia
- Coordinates: 36°49′30″N 76°30′09″W
- Area: 15 acres (6.1 ha)
- Built: 1887
- Architectural style: Federal, Queen Anne, Colonial Revival
- NRHP reference No.: 95000394
- VLR No.: 133-0693

Significant dates
- Added to NRHP: April 7, 1995
- Designated VLR: September 15, 1992

Driver Historic District is a national historic district located in the neighborhood of Driver in Suffolk, Virginia. The district encompasses 20 contributing buildings in the crossroads community of Driver in Suffolk. The district includes eight residences, two churches, two school structures, a lodge, an outbuilding, and five commercial structures. They are in a variety of popular 19th and early-20th century architectural styles including Federal, Queen Anne, and Colonial Revival. Notable buildings include the Parker House (1820-1840), Norfolk and Carolina Railroad depot and station master's house (c. 1890), Brannon House (c. 1892), Arthur's Store (c. 1925), Randy's Rods, Driver Variety Store, Beech Grove United Methodist Church, Berea Congregational Christian Church (c. 1891), Dejarnette High School (1926), and Harmony Lodge #149 (1938).

It was added to the National Register of Historic Places in 1995.
