= Crittenden Bridge =

- Coordinates: 36°54′50″N 76°30′14″W
- Carries: US 17
- Crosses: Chuckatuck Creek
- Locale: Suffolk, Virginia with Isle of Wight County
- Maintained by: Virginia DOT

History
- Opened: 1988

The Crittenden Bridge, also known as the Chuckatuck Creek Bridge, is officially named The Sidney B. Hazelwood Sr. Bridge after a prominent member of the community. This bridge is part of U.S. Route 17 and connects Suffolk, Virginia with Isle of Wight County.

== History ==
The current bridge, opened in December 1988, replaced an earlier one built in 1928 by the James River Bridge Corporation as part of a three bridge system which included the original James River Bridge and the Nansemond River Bridge, each of which have also been replaced with newer structures.
