= Huntington Park (Newport News, Virginia) =

Park in Newport News, Virginia, US

Coordinates: 37.021°N 76.454°W

Huntington Park is a park located in Newport News, Virginia, US. It offers a beach, two fishing piers, gardens, tennis, and museums. It is run by the Newport News Department of Parks, Recreation and Tourism. It was formed through a 1924 donation to the city of Newport News by Henry E. Huntington.

== Location ==
Huntington Park is located near the James River, and it is northwest to the James River Bridge.

== Offerings ==
The park has several different activities available to visitors:

=== Fort Fun ===
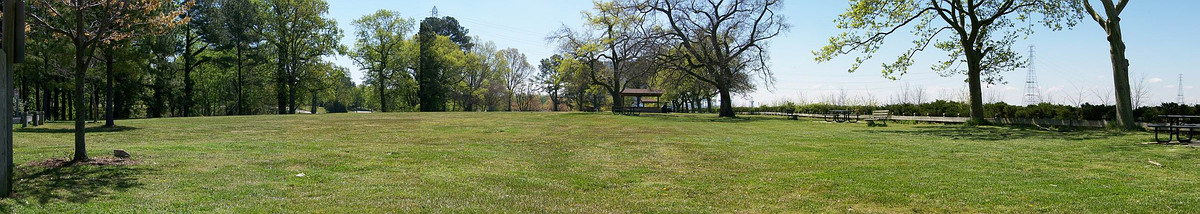

Fort Fun is a playground built in 1992 in the park. A community group, the Huntington Park Playground Association, was established to develop the playground in the early 1990s. The playground was designed professionally, but with significant contributions from local children on what they wanted to see in their new playground. The playground was then built as a volunteer effort – over 1,000 people contributed their time and effort to getting the playground built. The original wooden Fort Fun was replaced with a metal and plastic playground structure in 2012.

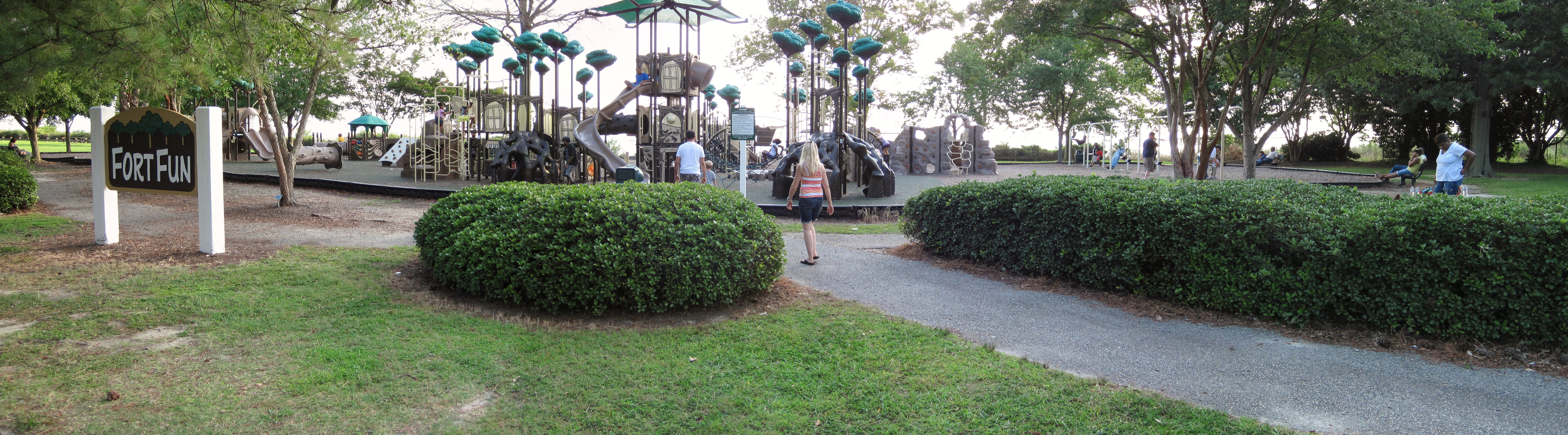

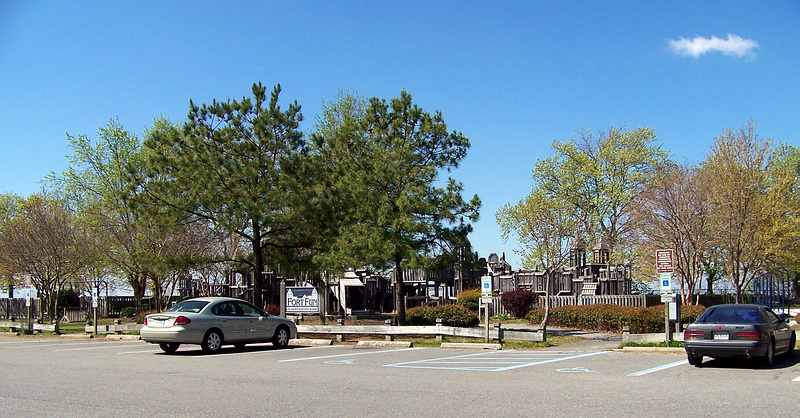
Fort Fun

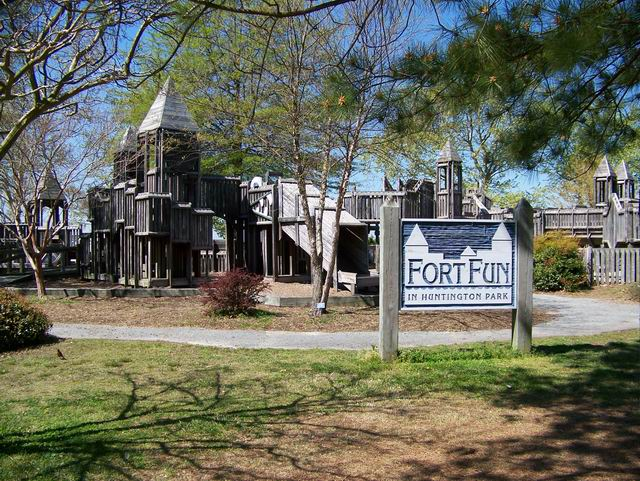
Fort Fun

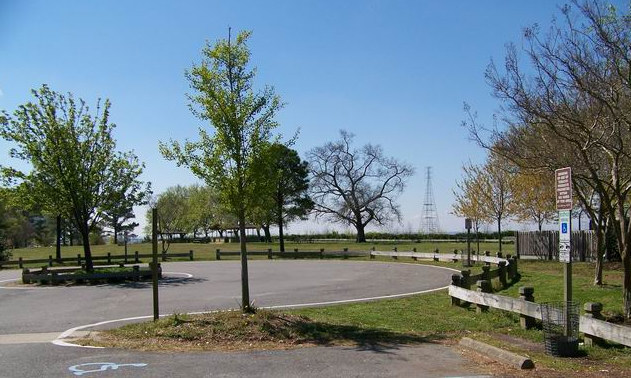
Picnic ground

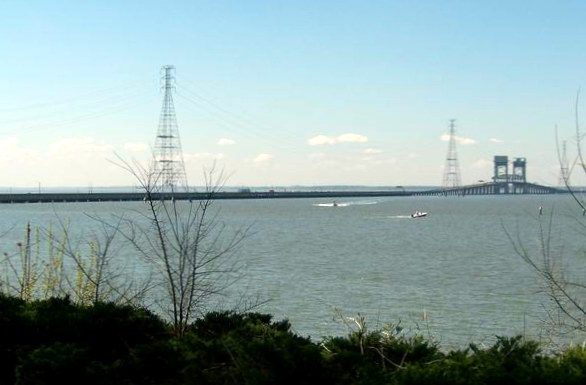
View of James River

=== Fishing Pier ===
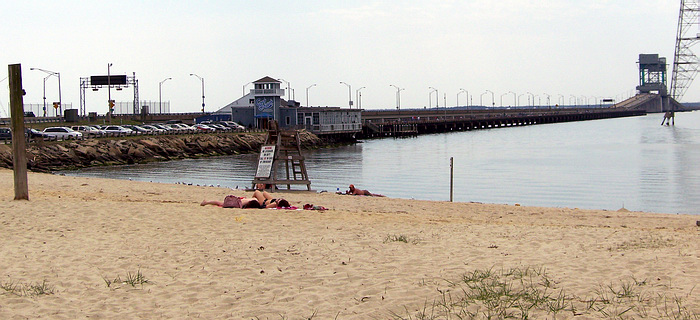

The James River Fishing Pier is a privately managed saltwater fishing pier. It utilizes what remains of the old, 2-lane James River Bridge. It is popular year-round with local fishermen. There is a charge to fish this pier, currently $8.50 for adults and $6 for children.

There is also a Children's Fishing Pier, which utilizes Lake Biggins. This is a freshwater lake located in the park.

=== Tennis ===
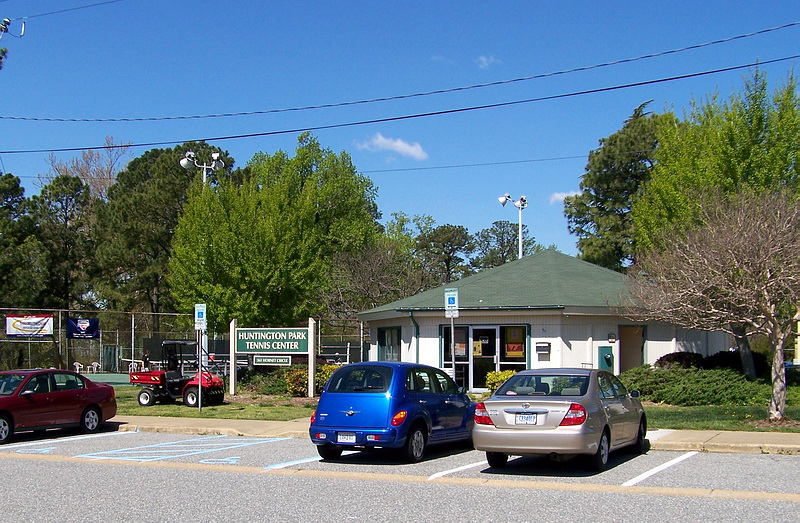

The Huntington Park Tennis Center consists of twenty hardcourts. The courts are lighted for use at night. Several city tennis leagues are run at the center, and instructional classes are available for all ages and skill levels. There is a tennis pro on staff at the center.

=== Beach ===
A moderately sized beach is located where the park meets the James River. The beach is staffed with lifeguards from Memorial Day to Labor Day. Concessions are available.

=== Museums and memorials ===
Three memorials, remembering servicemen who died in the Vietnam War, the Four Chaplains who gave up their lifejackets to save others in the sinking of the USAT Dorchester during World War II, and victims of the Holocaust, are located at the park. Huntington Park is also the location of the Virginia War Museum.
