= Driver, Suffolk, Virginia =

Neighborhood

Coordinates: 36°49′24″N 76°30′09″W

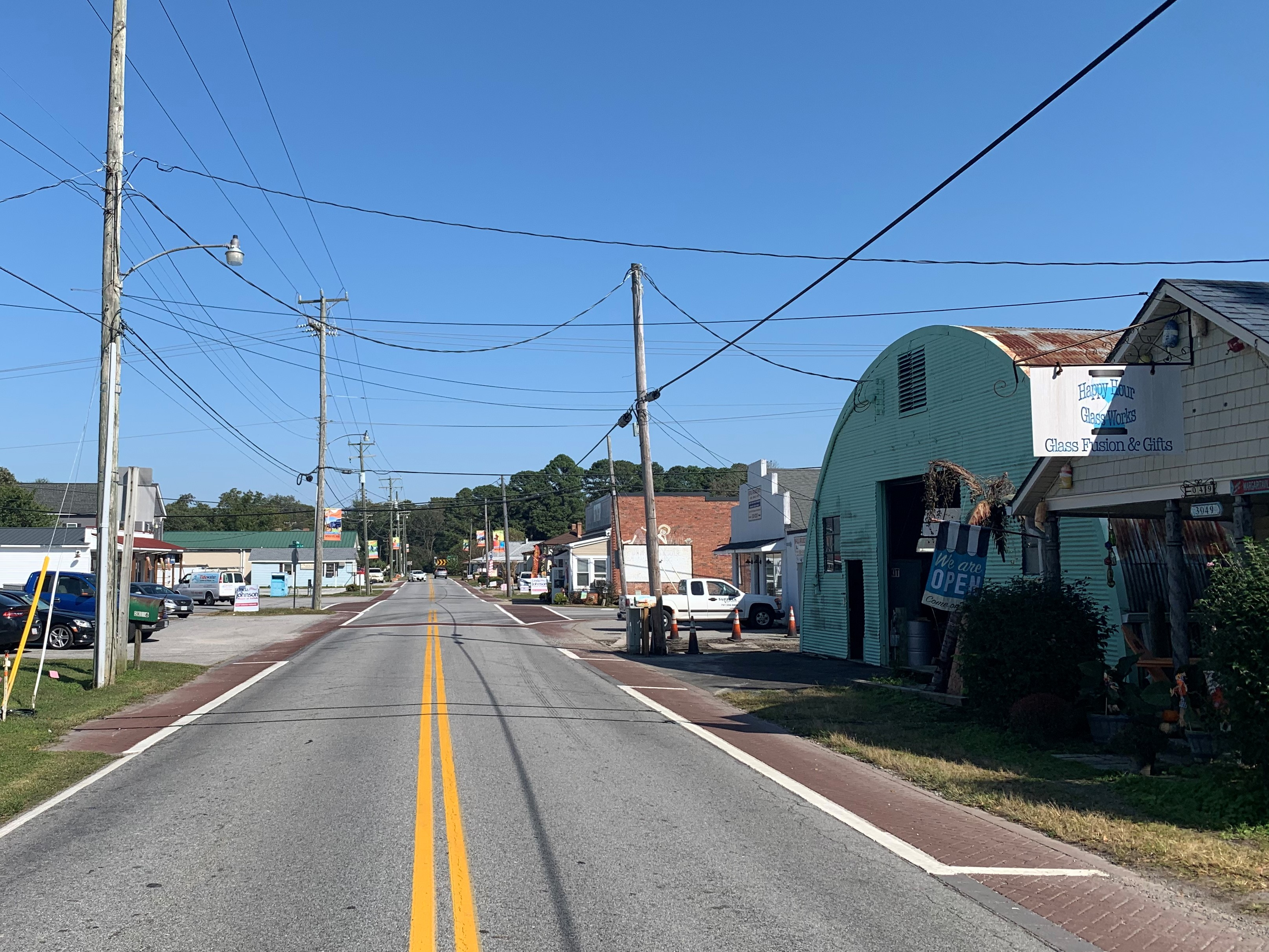
The commercial area of Driver, seen from State Route 125

Driver is a neighborhood in the independent city of Suffolk, Virginia, United States. It is located at the junction of State Route 337, State Route 125, and State Route 627. The Driver Historic District is listed in the National Register of Historic Places.

Originally named Persimmon Orchard, Driver was once located on the now-abandoned Atlantic Coast Line Railroad's line in the former Nansemond County between the former town of Suffolk and the City of Portsmouth, which was itself was located in the former Norfolk County.

Through traffic in Driver formerly used the now closed Kings Highway Bridge to cross the Nansemond River on State Route 125, known as the "Kings Highway." The swing bridge, opened in 1928, was deemed unsafe and closed to traffic in March 2005 by the Virginia Department of Transportation.

In modern times, as the Hampton Roads area has become largely urbanized all around it, it has been said that Driver is a town "suspended in time." Driver is known in Suffolk for its Driver Variety Store, which is styled as an old time general store, and its annual Driver Days festival.

== April 2008 Suffolk tornado ==
After 4:00 PM EST on April 28, 2008, a tornado touched down multiple times causing damage and leaving over 200 injured in Suffolk along a path which passed north and west of the downtown area striking near Sentara Obici Hospital and in Driver. The storm seriously damaged over 120 homes and 12 businesses. The subdivisions of Burnett's Mill and Hillpoint Farms were damaged particularly hard, as well as several of the older historic structures in Driver. However, near Driver, large radio and television broadcast towers located in an antenna farm serving most of Hampton Roads were spared serious damage.

Governor Timothy Kaine declared a state of emergency and directed state agencies to assist the recovery and cleanup efforts.

== Climate ==
The climate in this area is characterized by hot, humid summers and generally mild to cool winters. According to the Köppen Climate Classification system, Driver has a humid subtropical climate, abbreviated "Cfa" on climate maps.

== See also ==
- Former counties, cities, and towns of Virginia
