= Hobson, Virginia =

Coordinates: 36°53′42″N 76°30′43″W

Hobson is in the independent city of Suffolk, Virginia, United States. It is located along State Route 628 southwest of U.S. Route 17, on the neck between Chuckatuck Creek and the Nansemond River.
