= Nansemond River Bridge =

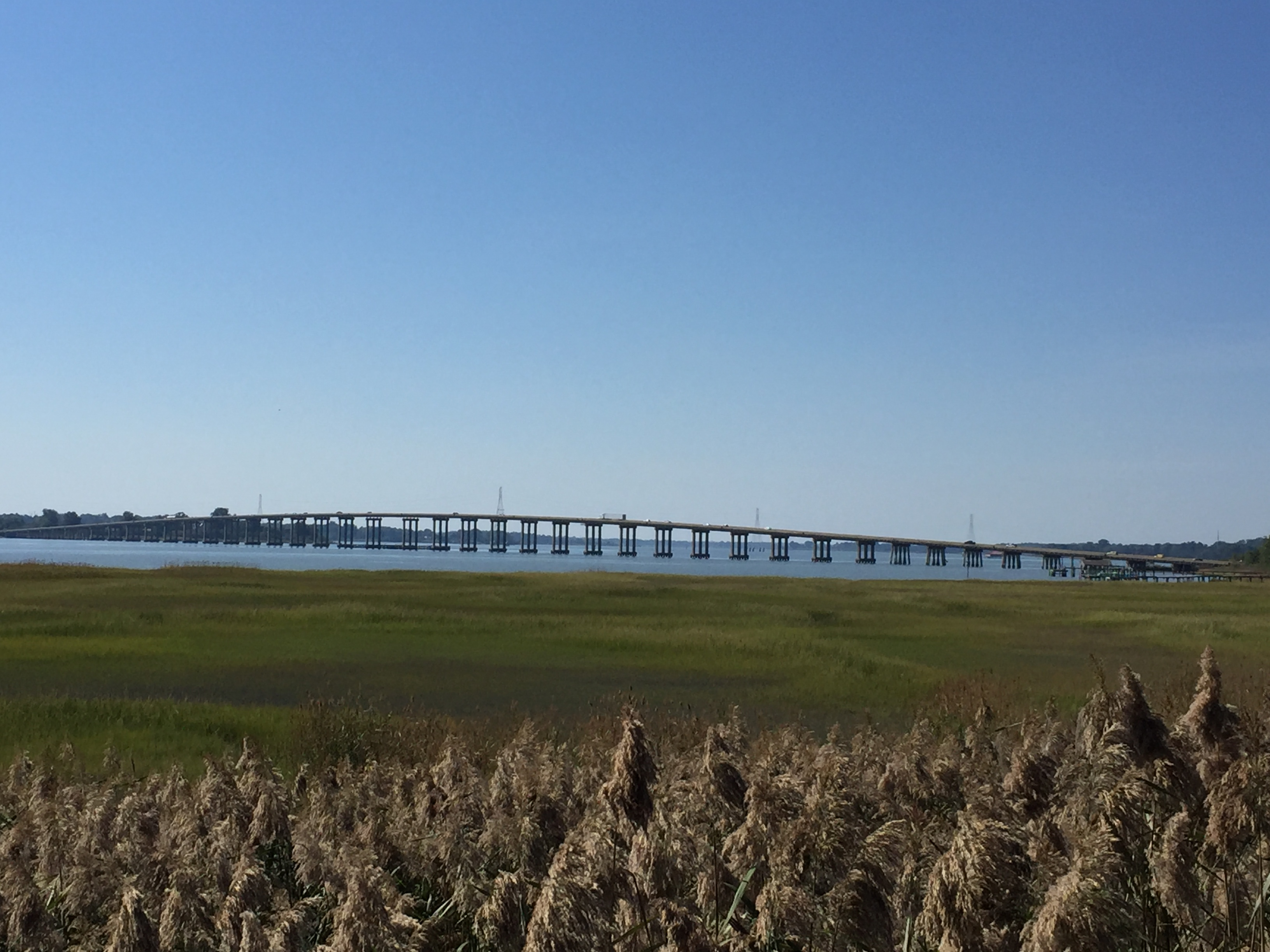
- The Nansemond River Bridge, as seen from Cedar Point in Suffolk Virginia in 2018
- Coordinates: 36°53′13″N 76°29′33″W
- Carries: US 17
- Crosses: Nansemond River
- Locale: Suffolk, Virginia
- Maintained by: Virginia DOT

History
- Opened: 1982

The Nansemond River Bridge, officially the Mills E. Godwin Bridge, is located in the independent city of Suffolk, Virginia and carries U.S. Route 17 across the Nansemond River.

The current bridge, opened in 1982, was named in honor of former Virginia governor Mills E. Godwin Jr., a prominent member of the Chuckatuck community.

The 1982 structure replaced an earlier one built in 1928 by the James River Bridge Corporation as part of a three-bridge system privately funded to be paid for through toll revenues. The others were the original James River Bridge and the Crittenden Bridge (also known as the Chuckatuck Creek Bridge), each of which was also replaced with newer structures during the last quarter of the 20th century.
