= Nansemond River Light =

Lighthouse in Virginia, United States

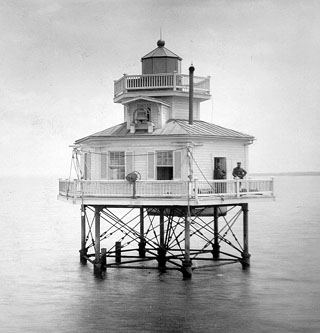
- Undated photograph of Nansemond River Light (USCG)
- Location: mouth of Nansemond River off Pig Point
- Coordinates: 36.912°N 76.445°W (approx.)

Tower
- Foundation: screw-pile
- Construction: cast-iron/wood
- Height: 36 feet (11 m)
- Shape: square house

Light
- First lit: 1878
- Deactivated: 1935
- Lens: sixth-order Fresnel lens (upgraded to fifth-order in 1899)

The Nansemond River Light was a screwpile lighthouse located at the confluence of the Nansemond and James rivers in Virginia.

== History ==
This light was erected in 1878 to mark the east side of the entrance to the Nansemond River. Some parts were recycled from the old Roanoke Marshes Light, which had been replaced the previous year. Little of note is recorded about this light, though in 1915 the keeper was cited for recovering a woman's wristwatch dropped overboard. The light was an early victim of automation in 1935, and in the late 1980s the whole structure was removed, leaving no trace of the light to be seen.
