= Kings Highway Bridge =

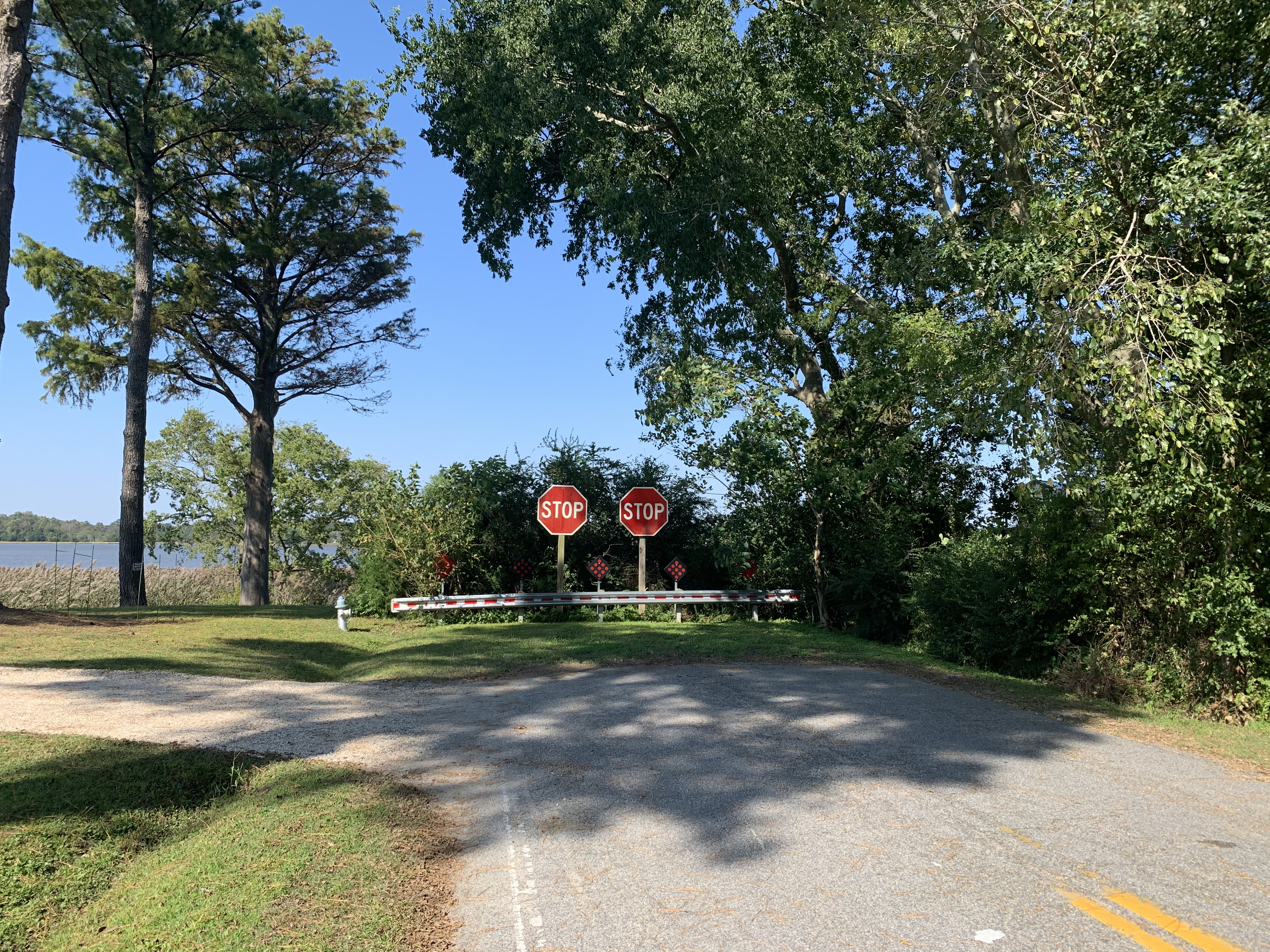
- The former southern terminus of the now closed bridge
- Coordinates: 36°50′N 76°33′W
- Carries: SR 125 (Kings Highway)
- Crosses: Nansemond River
- Locale: Suffolk, Virginia, United States
- Named for: Kings Highway

History
- Opened: 1928
- Closed: March 2005

Statistics
- Daily traffic: 3,300 motorists a day

Location
- Interactive map of Kings Highway Bridge

Kings Highway Bridge was located on the Nansemond River in the independent city of Suffolk, Virginia, United States. Built in 1928, it carried traffic on the Kings Highway, also known as State Route 125, for over 75 years.

The drawbridge was deemed unsafe and closed to traffic in March 2005 by the Virginia Department of Transportation (VDOT). In March 2007, VDOT announced that the bridge would be demolished and removed, with no plans for replacement, and demolition began in June. In 2008, several boats struck debris from the old bridge.

About 3,300 motorists a day used the bridge that connected Chuckatuck and Driver. Now, they face detours of as much as 19 miles. The cost of a new bridge for the King's Highway crossing was estimated at $48 million in 2006, far more than could be recovered through collection of tolls at that location.

== Proposal for a new bridge ==
In October 2021, the Suffolk City Council unanimously made a resolution requesting that the Virginia Department of Transportation build a new King's Highway Bridge. The city had studied a number of options, including building the new bridge at the same location or at Five Mile Road. Ultimately, they decided to support the construction of the new bridge at Five Mile Road, less than a mile south of the previous location.
