= Wallaceton (Chesapeake, Virginia) =

Historic house in Virginia, United States

- U.S. National Register of Historic Places
- Virginia Landmarks Register
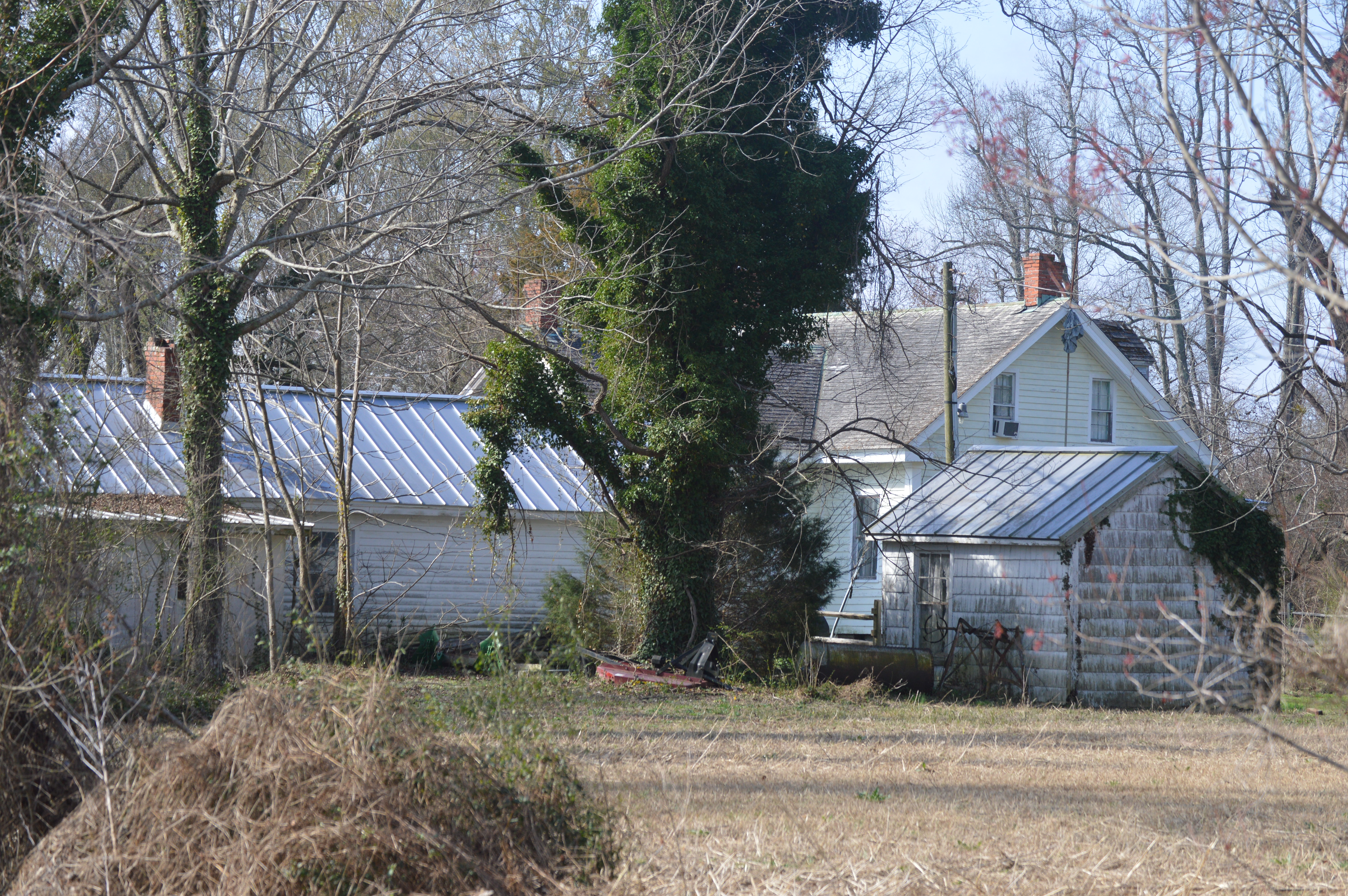
- Northern side

- Location within Virginia Location within the United States
- Location: 3509 George Washington Hwy., S, Chesapeake, Virginia
- Coordinates: 36°36′49″N 76°22′43″W
- Area: 3 acres (1.2 ha)
- Built: 1853
- Architectural style: Greek Revival
- NRHP reference No.: 94000455
- VLR No.: 131-0379

Significant dates
- Added to NRHP: May 19, 1994
- Designated VLR: March 10, 1994

Wallaceton is a historic home located at Chesapeake, Virginia, United States. The original section was built between 1853 and 1863, as a company store. It was expanded after the American Civil War. It is a 1 1/2-story, rectangular, Greek Revival style frame dwelling. It has flat corner pilasters, a heavy box cornice under the eaves, and a full-width front porch. Also on the property are a contributing two-room kitchen building and a dairy. About 1910, it was relocated approximately 100 feet (30 m) to the east of the Dismal Swamp Canal to remove it from canal property. It was named for John Gallaudet Wallace, a farmer and businessman who fought in the Civil War for the Confederacy.

It was listed on the National Register of Historic Places in 2000.
