= USS Katie =

Patrol vessel of the United States Navy

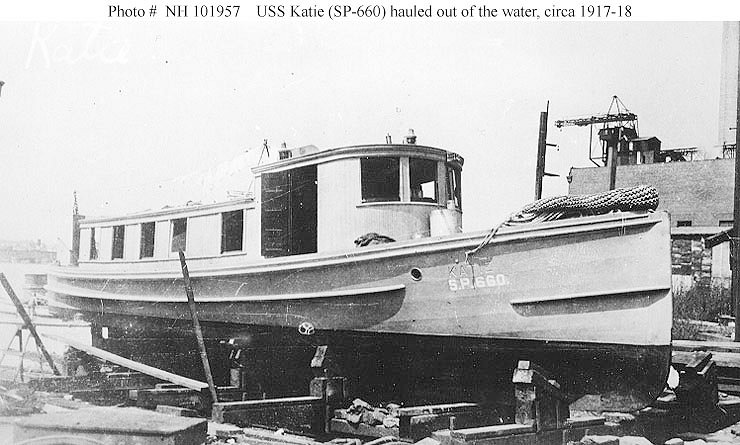
- USS Katie (SP-660) hauled out of the water during World War I

History

United States
- Name: USS Katie
- Namesake: Previous name retained
- Builder: C. E. Bush, Crittenden, Virginia
- Completed: 1915 or 1916
- Acquired: 18 May 1917 (delivery)
- Commissioned: 24 April 1917
- Decommissioned: 22 October 1918
- Fate: Returned to owner 22 October 1918
- Status: Extant, in private use
- Notes: Operated as civilian motorboat Katie 1916-1917 and since 1918

General characteristics
- Type: Patrol vessel
- Tonnage: 15 gross register tons
- Length: 48 ft (15 m)
- Beam: 11 ft 2 in (3.40 m)
- Draft: 3 ft 8 in (1.12 m)
- Speed: 10 knots
- Complement: 4
- Armament: None

USS Katie (SP-660) is a civilian motor vessel which was commissioned into the United States Navy as a patrol vessel from 1917 to 1918.

== Construction and acquisition ==
Katie was built as a civilian motorboat of the same name by C. E. Bush at Crittenden, Virginia, in 1915 or 1916. In 1917, the U.S. Navy chartered her from her owner, the Virginia Fish and Oyster Commission, for use as a section patrol boat during World War I. She was commissioned as USS Katie (SP-660) on 24 April 1917, although the Navy did not take delivery of her until 18 May 1917, at Norfolk, Virginia.

== U.S. Navy service ==
Assigned to the 5th Naval District and based at Crittenden, Katie operated as a shore and section patrol boat until less than three weeks before the end of World War I. Her patrols extended from Norfolk and the James River to the lower reaches of the Potomac River and the Chesapeake Bay.

Katie, now under command of Boatswain O. W. Hudson, was decommissioned on 22 October 1918 and was returned to the Virginia Fish and Oyster Commission the same day.

== Later career ==
Katie served the Virginia Fish and Oyster Commission until she was sold to the Redmond Lumber Corporation in 1956. She had two more owners before 1963, when William C. Poole purchased her. Poole used her both as a private yacht and as a United States Coast Guard Auxiliary operational facility.

In 2000, Katie was sold to William Stratton, then on 18 September 2001 to Leslie Porter. He performed restoration work on her and moved her to Belhaven, North Carolina.

In October 2003, William Patterson purchased Katie. He moved her to Richmond, Virginia, and made plans to take her to wooden boat shows on the Chesapeake Bay. She remains extant.

After years left docked in Richmond, VA the “Katie” sustained many damages, including a fire and multiple sinkings. Despite that she has persevered and was acquired by a small collective of friends. Katy Best, Caitlin Shiflett, Nathan Conway and Joshua Dziegiel.

In July of 2025, Katie was purchased by Matt and his father Patrick Harris of Richmond, Virginia. She continues to float at the Richmond Yacht Basin and is scheduled for a long period of repairs and restoration. Many volunteers have stepped up including members of the Richmond Navy League. Her original log books from WW1 have been located and a deep dive into her history is currently underway.

In 2026 the boat was sold to an unknown buyer.

She has an Instagram account as well, This Old Boat.
