= Makemie Park, Virginia =

Makemie Park
- Census-designated place
- Location in Accomack County and the state of Virginia.
- Coordinates: 37°54′38″N 75°35′4″W
- Country: United States
- State: Virginia
- County: Accomack
- Elevation: 7 ft (2.1 m)

Population (2020)
  - Total: 138
- Time zone: UTC−5 (Eastern (EST))
  - Summer (DST): UTC−4 (EDT)
- ZIP codes: 23442
- FIPS code: 51-48776
- GNIS feature ID: 2584872

Makemie Park is a census-designated place in Accomack County, Virginia, United States. Per the 2020 census, the population was 138.

== Geography ==
The CDP sits at an elevation of 7 feet.

== History ==
The town was originally known at Bloomtown, VA but the name was changed in 1908 to honor Rev. Francis Makemie, widely regarded as the founder of Presbyterianism in the United States. Mackimie spent the last few years of his life on a farm nearby where he was buried in 1708.

== Demographics ==
Historical population
Census	Pop.	Note	%±
2010	155		—
2020	138		−11.0%
U.S. Decennial Census; 2010 2020

Makemie Park was first listed as a census designated place in the 2010 U.S. census.

=== 2020 census ===
Makemie Park CDP, Virginia – Racial and ethnic composition Note: the US Census treats Hispanic/Latino as an ethnic category. This table excludes Latinos from the racial categories and assigns them to a separate category. Hispanics/Latinos may be of any race.
Race / Ethnicity (NH = Non-Hispanic)	Pop 2010	Pop 2020	% 2010	% 2020
White alone (NH)	16	18	10.32%	13.04%
Black or African American alone (NH)	137	112	88.39%	81.16%
Native American or Alaska Native alone (NH)	0	1	0.00%	0.72%
Asian alone (NH)	0	2	0.00%	1.45%
Pacific Islander alone (NH)	0	0	0.00%	0.00%
Other race alone (NH)	0	0	0.00%	0.00%
Mixed race or Multiracial (NH)	2	4	1.29%	2.90%
Hispanic or Latino (any race)	0	1	0.00%	0.72%
Total	155	138	100.00%	100.00%
