= Nansemond National Wildlife Refuge =

National Wildlife Refuge of the United States

- IUCN category IV (habitat/species management area)
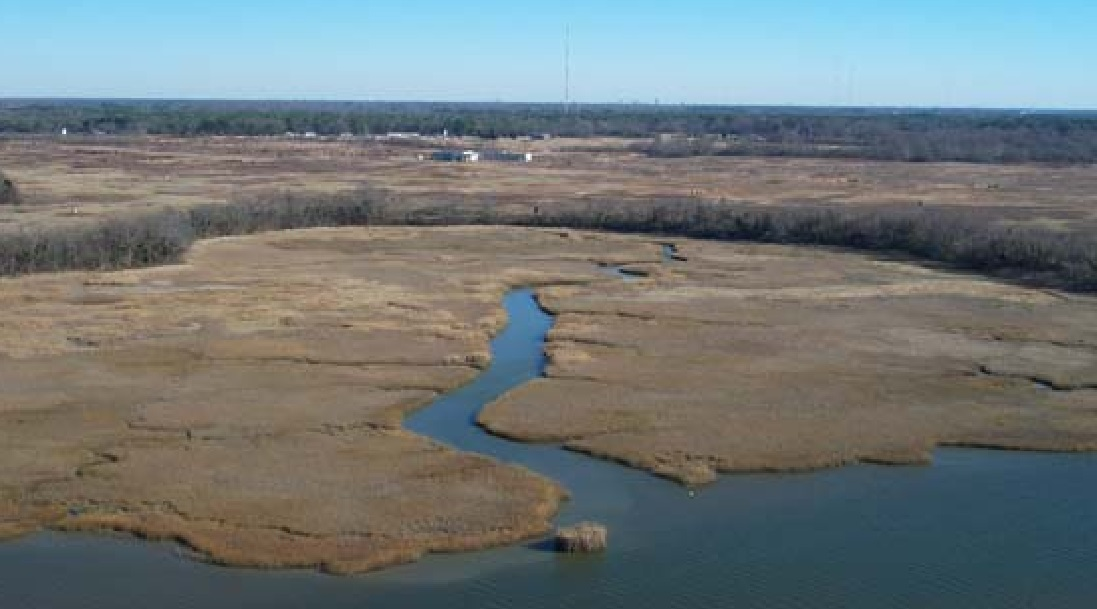

- Location within Virginia Location within the United States
- Location: Suffolk, Virginia, United States
- Coordinates: 36°49′02″N 76°33′00″W
- Area: 411 acres (166 ha)
- Established: 1973
- Governing body: U.S. Fish and Wildlife Service
- Website: Nansemond National Wildlife Refuge

The Nansemond National Wildlife Refuge is a National Wildlife Refuge of the United States located along the Nansemond River in Suffolk, Virginia. It is managed by the United States Fish and Wildlife Service as a satellite of Great Dismal Swamp National Wildlife Refuge. In 1973 about 207 acres (0.84 km^{2}) of salt marsh were transferred to the Service by the United States Navy to form the refuge. An additional 204 acres (0.83 km^{2}) were transferred in 1999.

The refuge is not open to the public.
