= Eastville Station, Virginia =

Unincorporated community in Virginia, US

Coordinates: 37°20′50″N 75°55′55″W

Eastville Station is an unincorporated community in Northampton County, Virginia, United States.
