= USS Patrol No. 6 =

Patrol vessel of the United States Navy

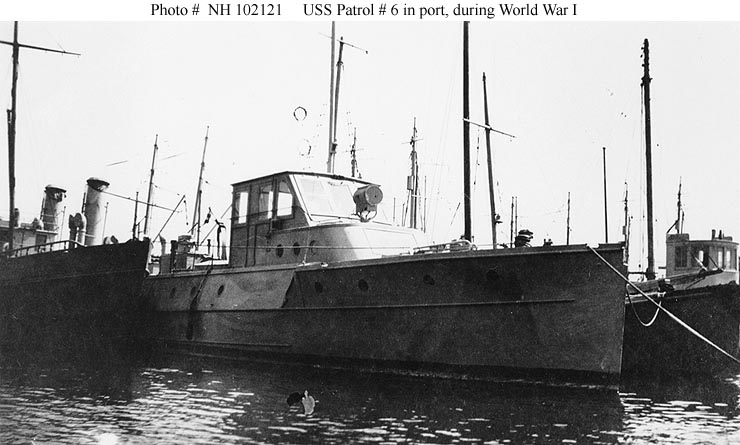
- USS Patrol No. 6 during World War I

History

United States
- Name: USS Patrol No. 6
- Builder: George Lawley and Son, Neponset, Massachusetts
- Completed: 1916
- Acquired: 16 June 1917
- Commissioned: 29 June 1917
- Stricken: 7 November 1919
- Fate: Sold 19 March 1921
- Notes: Operated as private motorboat Bonita 1916-1917

General characteristics
- Type: Patrol vessel
- Tonnage: 34 tons
- Length: 63 ft 0 in (19.20 m)
- Beam: 12 ft 0 in (3.66 m)
- Draft: 3 ft 6 in (1.07 m)
- Speed: 32 knots
- Complement: 9
- Armament: 2 × 1-pounder guns

USS Patrol No. 6 (SP-54), often rendered as USS Patrol #6, was an armed motorboat that served in the United States Navy as a patrol vessel from 1917 to 1919.

Patrol No. 6 was built as the private motorboat Bonita in 1916 by George Lawley and Son at Neponset, Massachusetts. The U.S. Navy purchased Bonita from Herman Oelrichs of Newport, Rhode Island on 16 June 1917 and commissioned her for service in World War I as USS Patrol No. 6 (SP-54) on 29 June 1917.

Patrol No. 6 operated in the 2nd Naval District, headquartered at Newport, on patrol throughout the United States' participation in World War I. She was decommissioned postwar and stricken from the Naval Vessel Register on 7 November 1919. She was sold to George A. Crowley of New York City on 19 March 1921.
