= USS Felicia (SP-642) =

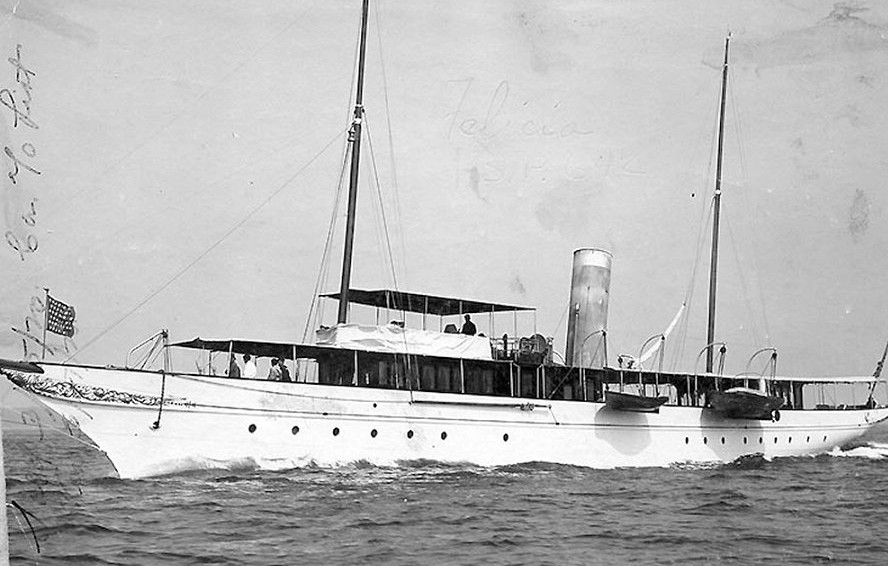
- Felicia underway prior to World War I.

History

United States
- Name: Felicia
- Namesake: Former name retained
- Owner: Jesse H. Metcalf
- Port of registry: Providence, Rhode Island
- Builder: J.N. Robins Company, Brooklyn
- Launched: 1898
- Christened: as Felicia
- Completed: 1898
- Acquired: 21 June 1917
- Commissioned: 29 June 1917 as USS Felicia (SP-642)
- Decommissioned: 25 August 1919 at Brooklyn
- Stricken: September 1919
- Fate: Sold 25 March 1920

General characteristics
- Type: steam yacht
- Tonnage: 213 GRT, 146 NRT
- Length: 179 ft (54.6 m) overall
- Beam: 20.1 ft (6.1 m)
- Draft: 7 ft 6 in (2.29 m)
- Depth: 10.9 ft (3.3 m)
- Installed power: 49 NHP
- Propulsion: 1 × quadruple-expansion engine; 1 × screw
- Sail plan: schooner
- Speed: 14 knots (26 km/h)
- Complement: 49 officers and enlisted
- Armament: 3 × 3-pounder guns

USS Felicia (SP-642) was a steam yacht acquired by the United States Navy during World War I. She was outfitted and armed by the Navy as a patrol craft, and was assigned to patrol the New England waters. Her task of protecting ships from German submarines was interrupted by her collision with a submarine. Post-war she was reconfigured to her civilian condition, and was sold in 1919.

== Built as a yacht in Brooklyn ==
The first ship to be so named by the Navy, Felicia (No. 642) was built in 1898 by J. N. Robins Company, Brooklyn New York; purchased by the Navy 2 June 1917; and commissioned 29 June 1917. (The other USS Felicia, PYc-35, was built in 1931, and served in World War II.)

== World War I service ==
Based out of Newport, Rhode Island, Felicia patrolled the New England coast, on duty with the 2d Naval District, until August 39, 1918, when she collided with a submarine in heavy fog off Montauk Point.

== Decommissioning and sale ==
Felicia was in repair or laid up at various yards until decommissioned at Brooklyn, 25 August 1919. Felicia was stricken from the list of Naval vessels in September 1919 and sold 25 March 1920.
