= Crittenden, Virginia =

Crittenden
- Unincorporated community
- Crittenden, Virginia
- Location within Virginia Location within the United States
- Coordinates: 36°54′36″N 76°29′46″W
- Country: United States
- State: Virginia
- City: Suffolk

Crittenden is an unincorporated community in the independent city of Suffolk, Virginia, United States. It is located along U.S. Route 17 just south of its crossing of Chuckatuck Creek.
