= Chuckatuck Creek =

Stream in Virginia, United States

Coordinates: 36°55′27″N 76°29′38″W

Chuckatuck Creek is a 13.3-mile-long (21.4 km) tributary of the James River in the U.S. state of Virginia. The creek rises in Isle of Wight County and flows southeast to Chuckatuck in the city of Suffolk, where it turns northeast as it passes under State Route 10/State Route 32. Becoming tidal, the creek continues northeast to the mouth of Brewers Creek, where it broadens considerably and becomes the boundary between Isle of Wight County and the city of Suffolk. If proceeds under the Crittenden Bridge (U.S. Route 17) at Crittenden and reaches the James River at Batten Bay.

== See also ==
- List of rivers of Virginia
