= Chuckatuck, Virginia =

Neighborhood in Suffolk, Virginia, US

Coordinates: 36°51′43″N 76°34′48″W

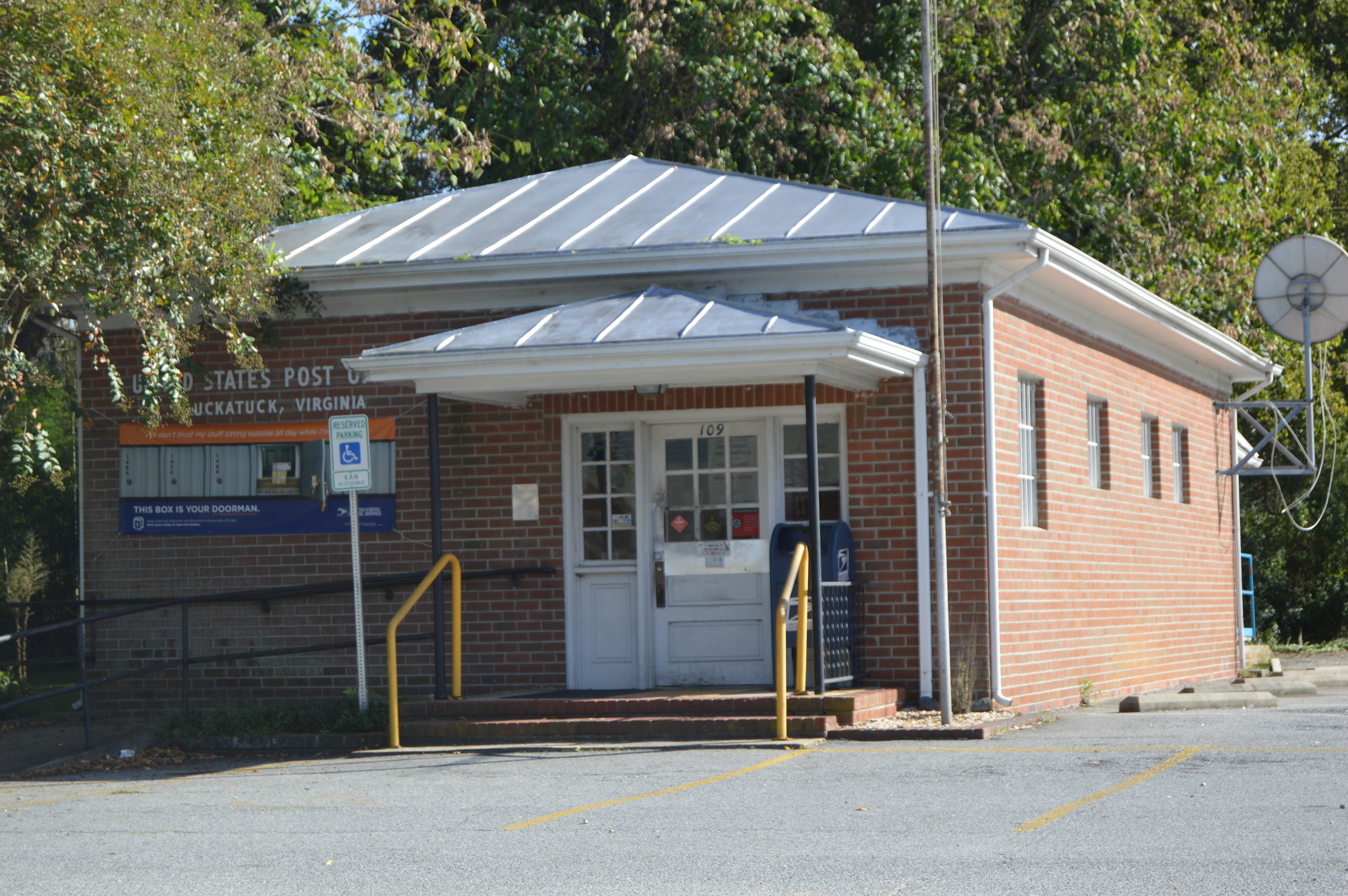
Chuckatuck Post Office

Chuckatuck is a neighborhood of the independent city of Suffolk, Virginia, United States. It is located at the junction of State Route 10/State Route 32 and State Route 125, just south of SR 10/32's crossing of Chuckatuck Creek. Its elevation is 36 feet above mean sea level. The neighborhood is relatively small and consists of such businesses as a garden store, general store, automobile repair shop, three churches, two gas stations, a restaurant, a hardware store, and others. It has a fire department, Suffolk station nine, which is operated as the Chuckatuck Volunteer Fire Department. The community is also located near Lone Star Lakes, a recreational park.

Former Virginia Governor Mills Godwin and jazz guitarist Charlie Byrd grew up in Chuckatuck.

A grist mill was constructed as early as 1635 by colonist Richard Bartlett at the head of Chuckatuck (or Crooked) Creek. "Chuckatuck" is a Nansemond word meaning "crooked".

== See also ==
- Suffolk, Virginia
- Political subdivisions of Virginia#Boroughs
