= Nansemond River =

River in the United States of America

Coordinates: 36°53′55.9″N 76°28′25.1″W

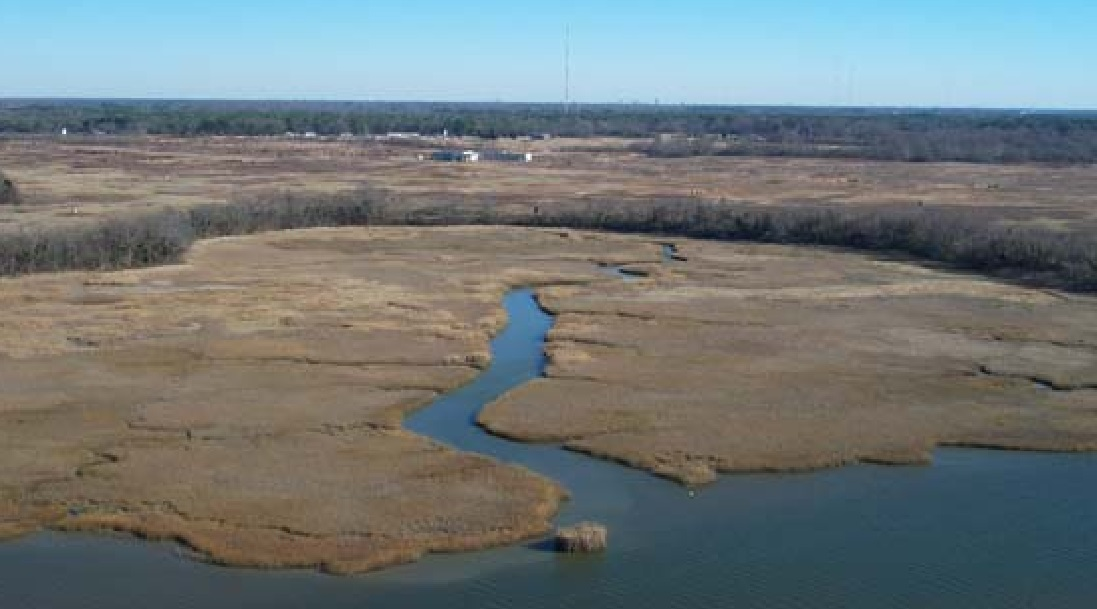
Tidal marsh on the Nansemond River

The Nansemond River is a 19.8-mile-long (31.9 km) tributary of the James River located in the City of Suffolk, Virginia in the United States.

The river features numerous waterways and salt marshes that make up part of the more than 5,500 acres of tidal wetlands within the City of Suffolk. These marshes are influenced daily by changing tides, and their fluctuating salinity allows only highly adaptable plants to thrive—often resulting in areas of mud or sand flats. In addition to tidal wetlands, Suffolk also contains non-tidal freshwater wetlands, which may be seasonally or permanently wet, such as Chapel Swamp in the Village of Holland. Tidal wetlands play a vital role as spawning and nursery habitats for many marine species, making them essential to the Chesapeake Bay’s marine economy. Beyond their ecological importance, wetlands help control flooding, reduce storm surge impacts, improve water quality, limit erosion, and provide critical food sources for both marine and terrestrial wildlife.

== History ==
Virginian colonists named the river for the Nansemond tribe of Native Americans, who had long inhabited the area and relied on its waters for fishing and sustenance. In 1609, Captain John Smith explored the river, marking one of the earliest recorded European encounters with the area. By 1642, Anglican settlers had established a parish along its shores, known today as St. John’s Church. The Nansemond continue as a federally recognized tribe in Virginia.

== Watershed ==
The Nansemond River begins in downtown Suffolk and flows 23 miles to its confluence with the James River. Historically, several streams—including those that now form Lakes Cahoon, Kilby, and Meade—served as its headwaters. These waterways were later impounded by dams, separating them from the river; they are now owned by the City of Portsmouth. Similarly, Lakes Burnt Mills and Prince were once headwater streams of the Western Branch but were dammed and are now owned by the City of Norfolk. Because of these alterations, the Nansemond River has little direct input of freshwater aside from occasional lake overflow. Bennett’s Creek, which joins the river downstream of the Route 17 Bridge, is a major tributary. The Nansemond River watershed covers approximately 161,358 acres across Suffolk and Isle of Wight County, although much of the rainfall is diverted into the impounded lakes. Salinity in the river varies significantly, averaging about 15 parts per thousand (brackish) near its mouth and only 1–2 parts per thousand near downtown Suffolk. Much of the river outside the navigation channel is shallow, with an average tidal range of about three feet.

The Nansemond River Light once signaled the river's confluence with the James.

The Nansemond River Bridge, once a toll bridge and part of U.S. Route 17, crosses the river near its mouth. Two other bridges cross the river, one from downtown Suffolk and one on Route 58.

The Nansemond National Wildlife Refuge is located along the river. The refuge was incorporated into the U.S. Fish and Wildlife Service’s National Wildlife Refuge System in 1973, following the transfer of 207 acres of salt marsh from the U.S. Navy. In 1999, an additional 204 acres of upland grassland and forested stream corridors were transferred. Today, the refuge provides important habitat for a wide variety of local wildlife.

== See also ==
- List of rivers of Virginia
