= Ludwell–Paradise House =

18th-century home in Williamsburg, Virginia

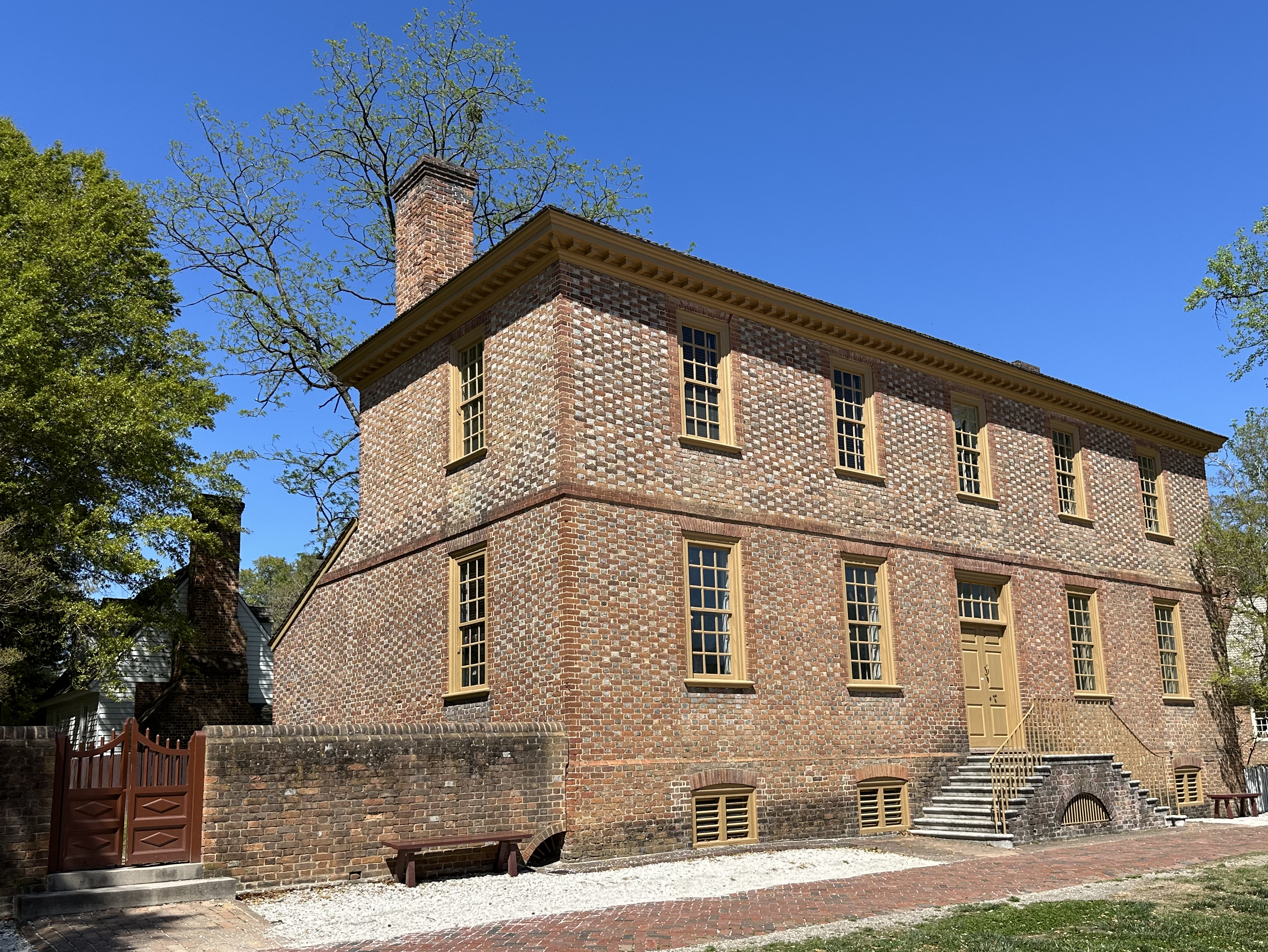
- Front of the house
- Interactive map of the Ludwell–Paradise House area
- Former names: Slater House
- Alternative names: Paradise House

General information
- Status: Private rental residence
- Architectural style: Early Georgian architecture
- Location: 207 E Duke of Gloucester Street, Williamsburg, Virginia
- Coordinates: 37°16′17.4″N 76°41′54.7″W
- Named for: Philip Ludwell III; John Paradise
- Year built: 1752–1753
- Owner: Colonial Williamsburg Foundation

Height
- Height: 27.27 feet (8.31 m)

Technical details
- Material: Brick, wood
- Floor count: 2

Design and construction
- Architecture firm: Perry, Shaw and Hepburn, Architects (restoration)

The Ludwell–Paradise House, often also called the Paradise House, (Note: A book on antebellum Williamsburg indicates that the building was known as the Slater House during the 19th century.) is a historic home along Duke of Gloucester Street and part of Colonial Williamsburg in Williamsburg, Virginia. The home was built in 1752–1753 for Philip Ludwell III. In December 1926, it became the first property John D. Rockefeller Jr. authorized W. A. R. Goodwin to purchase as part of the Colonial Williamsburg restoration campaign. After being restored, the Ludwell–Paradise House held the Abby Aldrich Rockefeller Folk Art Collection from 1935 to 1956. The building now serves as a rented private residence in the Williamsburg historic area.

Philip Ludwell II purchased the lot where the Ludwell–Paradise House was constructed in September 1700. Possibly built on the site of a prior house that was constructed between 1680 and 1690, timbers in the surviving structure were dated as being felled in 1752 and brickwork indicates the entire building was completed simultaneously. After being used as a rental property, a tavern that once hosted George Washington, and a host for The Virginia Gazette newspaper, the house's ownership passed to William Lee. Although they made an unfounded legal claim, Philip Ludwell III's daughter Lucy Ludwell Paradise and her husband, John Paradise, were associated with the house, giving the building its name. When the house was one of several properties seized from Paradise and Lee by Patriots during the American Revolutionary War, the Paradises' friend Samuel Johnson privately quipped about "Paradise's loss".

Lucy Ludwell Paradise lived in the home from 1805 until she was institutionalized at the Williamsburg Public Hospital in 1812. On her death, her grandson, Philip Ignatius Barziza, took up residence at the home and sought Thomas Jefferson's help in an unsuccessful attempt to claim it as an inheritance. Philip Barziza's son Decimus et Ultimus Barziza, later a Confederate officer and Texas politician, was born in the house. The home was later owned by the Slater family, eventually passing to Marie Louise Stewart. Stewart, knowing of Goodwin's plan to restore Williamsburg to its 18th-century appearance, sold him the property. Briefly transferred to the College of William & Mary, it was returned to the Colonial Williamsburg project and restored in the early 1930s. It would then house Abby Aldrich Rockefeller's folk art collection until a purpose-built museum was opened.

The home's restored appearance features a one-room-deep front portion that rises two stories and a single-story shed that spans the building's length on its rear, northern side. The exterior brickwork survives and is laid in the Flemish bond pattern with glazed accents. Much of the original interior woodwork has been lost, with renovations introducing paneling recovered from another 18th-century Virginia home. Reconstructed outbuildings also sit on the property.

== History ==
=== 18th century ===
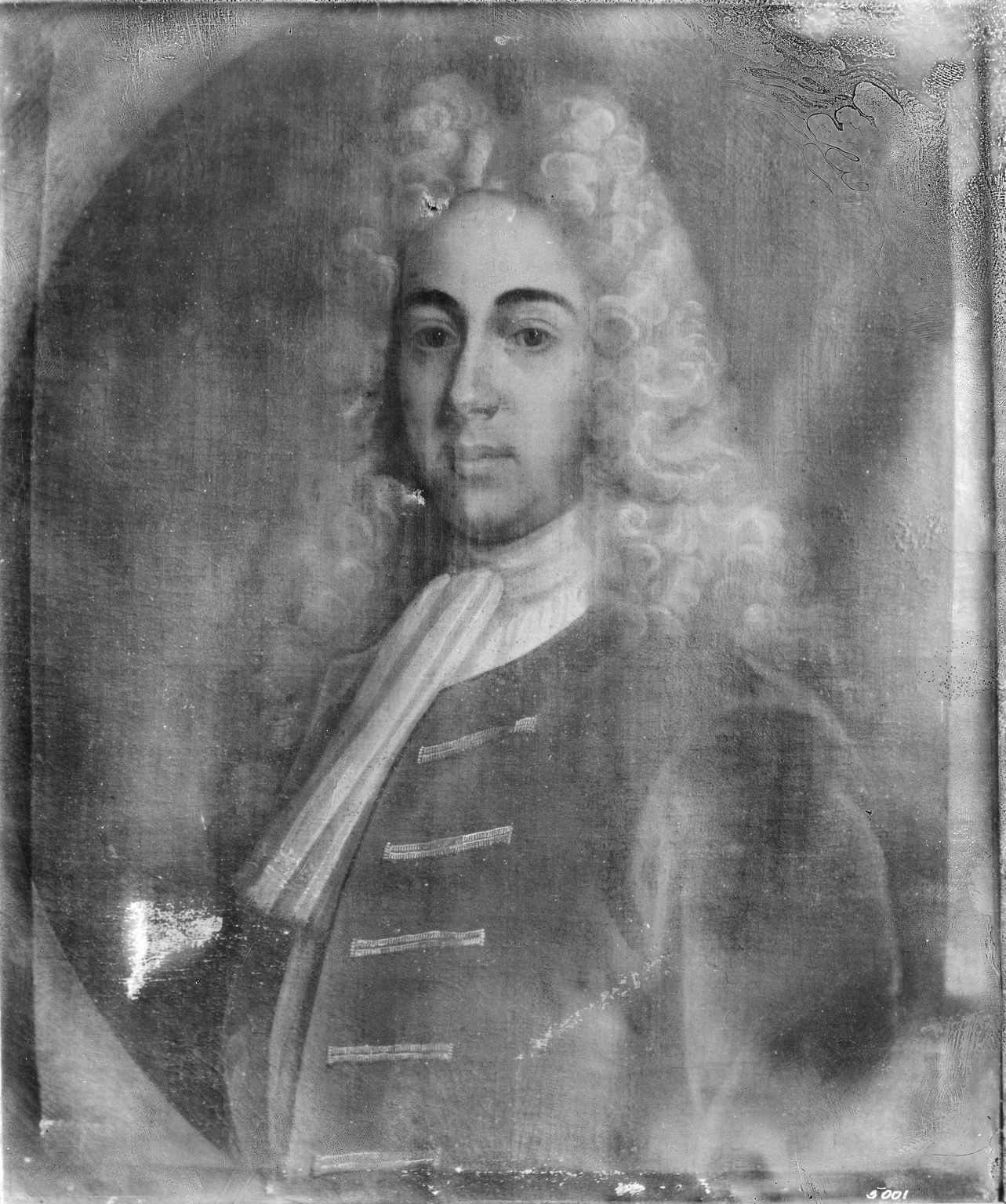
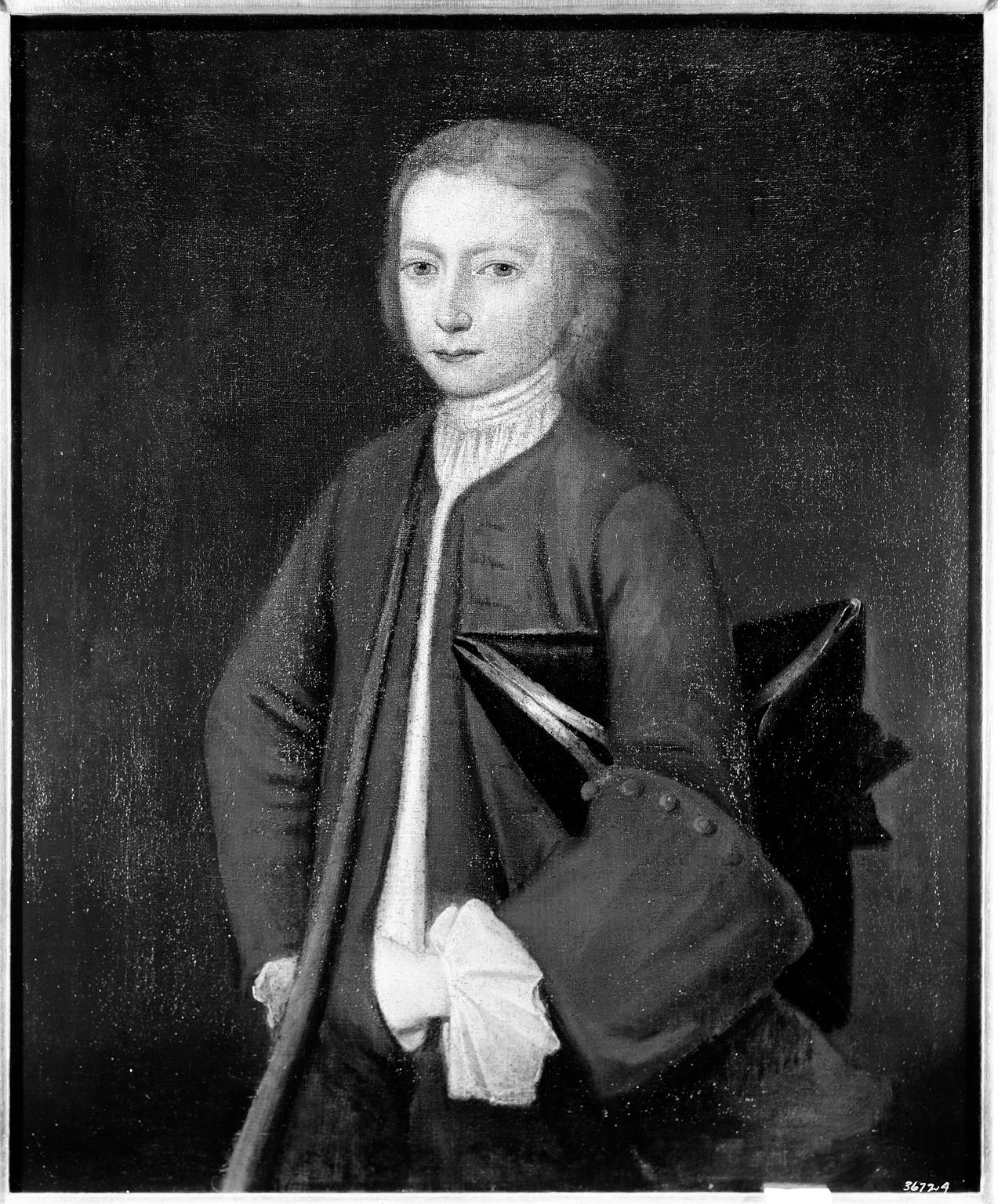
In 1700, Philip Ludwell Jr. (left) purchased the Williamsburg lot where his son Philip Ludwell III (right) built the house in 1752.

The lot now containing the Ludwell–Paradise House was granted by the trustees of the new city of Williamsburg to Philip Ludwell II, then resident at the large Green Spring Plantation, located 6 miles (9.7 km) to Williamsburg's west, in September 1700. It was the eastern-most lot purchased by Ludwell at that time and fronted to Duke of Gloucester Street. The records for Ludwell's deed unusually survived, having been stored in York County and not lost with other James City County records in the burning of Richmond during the American Civil War.

Because the eastern lot did not escheat to the city like the other two Ludwell had acquired at the same time, architectural historian Marcus Whiffen held that Ludwell had built a house on the property within two years; another home, constructed on the site between 1680 and 1690, was previously on the site. Some later opinions – including from Colonial Williamsburg restoration architects Perry, Shaw and Hepburn – dated the still-standing house's construction to the 1710–1717 period when Ludwell was colonial deputy auditor general. However, architectural styling suggests that it dated to after 1737, the year Philip Ludwell III took over his inheritance upon coming of age.

Colonial Williamsburg ordered analysis utilizing dendrochronology on timbers from the house's first floor dated them to 1752. The house is now dated as having been constructed in 1752–1753 for use by Philip Ludwell III as a rental tenement. Philip Ludwell III and his ancestors were among many English transatlantic business figures who spent extended periods in England while closely monitoring their interests in Virginia. In 1738, Philip Ludwell III became one of the earliest English converts to Eastern Orthodox Christianity while in London and is the first known convert to Eastern Orthodoxy in the Americas. His three daughters–Lucy, Hannah, and Frances–were baptized as Eastern Orthodox. Lucy went on to marry John Paradise, who was also Eastern Orthodox.

In 1755, Philip Ludwell III was advertising the house for renters in The Virginia Gazette. It would also serve as a "fashionable tavern" where the governors of Virginia would entertain guests. While in Williamsburg to serve in the House of Burgesses, George Washington stayed at the house. From the 1760s until October 1775, The Virginia Gazette newspaper was printed in the building. William and Clementina Rind of Annapolis, Maryland, were tenants in the home from 1773 and participated in the printing of newspaper.

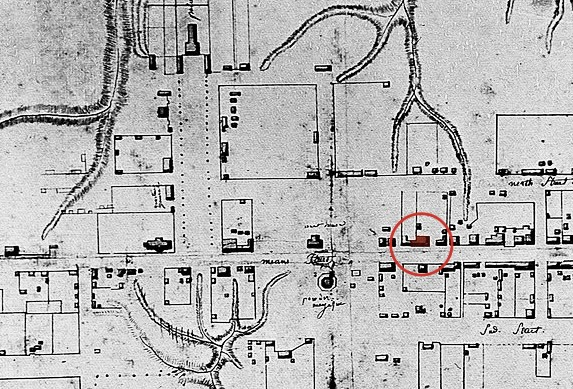
The Ludwell–Paradise House (circled, red) highlighted on the Frenchman's Map of Williamsburg, c. 1782

After Philip Ludwell III's death in 1767, ownership of his Williamsburg properties passed to his daughter Frances. (Note: Philip Ludwell III was the last of the male Ludwell family in Virginia.) Frances died the next year, and her inheritance was divided between the spouses of her sisters, Paradise and William Lee (husband of Hannah Ludwell). Ownership of the "brick house", as it was identified in correspondence, became disputed. While the Paradises still claimed the property, later renting documents and deeds indicated Lee owned the house. On Lee's 1795 death, his son William Ludwell Lee is thought to have inherited the property (though it is not explicitly mentioned in the elder Lee's will). When William Ludwell Lee died unmarried in 1803, his property passed to his sisters. (Note: Maps, dating to c. 1784 and 1800, indicate the Ludwell-Paradise House's lot as belonging to a Lee. An adjacent lot is labeled as "Paradise".)

Through this period, the Paradises maintained a claim to property that had belonged to the Ludwell family in Virginia. At their London home, the couple entertained figures that included Thomas Jefferson and Samuel Johnson. When their Virginia properties and the brick house in Williamsburg were seized by Patriots during the American Revolutionary War, the Paradises called upon Jefferson and Benjamin Franklin to recover their properties, though these efforts were not immediately successful. In 1778, Lee received word that his Williamsburg houses were being used by American troops as barracks. Johnson recorded the affair in his diary with the pun "Paradise's Loss". John Paradise's name was applied to the structure, even though he never lived in nor owned it. Correspondences from William Lee to Williamsburg politicians John Prentis (1785) and Benjamin Waller (1787) indicate that the house was rented out in 1785 and 1786.

=== 19th century ===
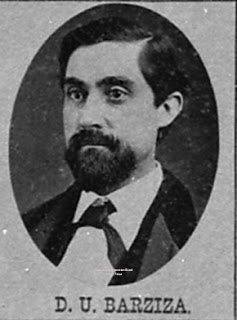
Confederate soldier and Texas politician Decimus et Ultimus Barziza was born in the Ludwell–Paradise House.

Lucy Ludwell Paradise returned to Virginia permanently in August 1805, almost ten years after her husband's death. She brought all of her portable belongings, including a piano forte, an ornamented carriage, and a mahogany table at which both Jefferson and Johnson had sat. At this time, Paradise's mental state was degrading. Jefferson – by then president of United States – was dismissive of Paradise's efforts at correspondence once she reached Virginia. She had more success with Littleton Waller Tazewell, who had been a friend of William Ludwell Lee. He arranged to rent the brick house from Lucy Ludwell Paradise's nieces to serve as her residence.

The Williamsburg community soon deemed her an "eccentric" for her public behavior. She would placed her carriage in a room of the house and enjoyed pretending to ride it. In one episode, she took guests to the unhitched carriage and had her Black servant Henry wheel the carriage around the room for an hour before allowing the guests to disembark. Alongside mental illness, her religious customs created tension with her neighbors. She was institutionalized at the Williamsburg Public Hospital and declared insane in January 1812. When she died there on April 24, 1814, her will erroneously listed the brick house as among her properties. Shortly afterwards, her nieces, Mrs. Hopkins and Mrs. Hodgson, reasserted their legal claim to the property.

John and Lucy Ludwell Paradise's daughter Lucy married Antonio Barziza, a Venetian count. (Note: Lucy Barziza would die estranged from her parents in Venice in 1800; her marriage to Antonio Barziza had reduced John and Lucy Ludwell Paradise's incomes to only their Virginia concerns. The Paradises' other child, Philippa, was born in 1774 and had died in 1787.) In 1815, Lucy and Antonio's son Philip Ignatius Barziza came to the United States at age 18 to claim the inheritance, including the Ludwell–Paradise House. To claim the inheritance, Philip Barziza surrendered his title of viscount and became an American citizen. Philip, like his grandmother, wrote to Jefferson in the hopes of his intervention. While Jefferson was sympathetic to the claim and entertained Barziza at Monticello, in 1826 the Virginia Supreme Court ultimately ruled against Philip in favor of Hopkins and Hodgson. Despite this, Barziza continued to rent the Ludwell–Paradise House with his Williamsburg-native wife, Cecile Belette. Philip Barziza eventually became a keeper at the Williamsburg Public Hospital and died sometime after 1858.

Philip Barziza had ten children with Cecile. The last, a boy named Decimus et Ultimus Barziza, was born in the house and later served in the Texas state legislature.

Marquis de Lafayette dined at the house during his 1824 tour of the United States. Tax records indicate ownership of the house, then known as the Paradise House, passed to James Lee by 1818. By 1854, Parks Slater was listed as responsible for the house in right of his wife, Virginia Slater, the daughter of James Lee. The home then came to also be known as the Slater House. During this time, the building entered a state of disrepair. During a 19th-century renovation, Parks Slater displayed some of the house's exposed upstairs plastering that featured portions of Revolutionary War-era newspapers. The house next passed to J. C. Slater.

=== Colonial Williamsburg ===
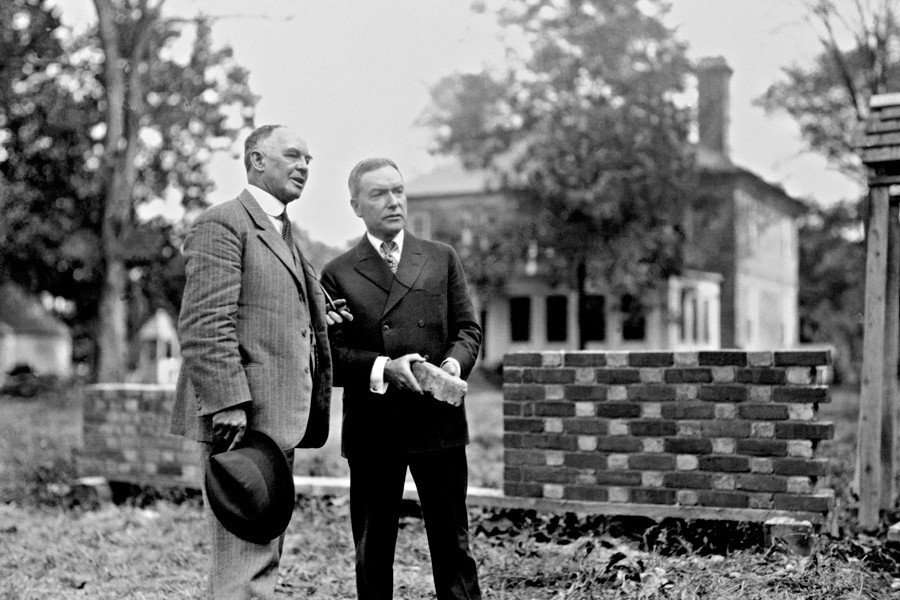
W. A. R. Goodwin (left) with John D. Rockefeller Jr. in Williamsburg, November 1926. The Ludwell–Paradise House was the first property Rockefeller authorized Goodwin to purchase for the Colonial Williamsburg restoration project.

In 1924, Bruton Parish Church rector W. A. R. Goodwin began lobbying John D. Rockefeller Jr. for financial support for the College of William & Mary at a Phi Beta Kappa alumni event in New York City. (Note: Phi Beta Kappa had been founded at William & Mary. Goodwin had been fundraising to raise $200,000 ($3.76 million in 2025) to fund Blow Hall and Phi Beta Kappa Memorial Hall.) Rockefeller travelled to Williamsburg with his wife, Abby Aldrich Rockefeller, and their children in March 1926. The college's president, Julian A. C. Chandler, arranged for them to tour Williamsburg by car with Goodwin. Though Rockefeller initially opted to not sponsor the restoration of the college's Wren Building, Rockefeller visited Williamsburg in November 1926 for the dedication of Phi Beta Kappa Hall on the college's campus. In early December 1926, Rockefeller wrote to Goodwin again, declining to pay for the Wren Building restoration but inquiring about restoring other Williamsburg buildings of colonial vintage.

Later that month, Goodwin encountered real estate salesman Gardiner T. Brooks, representing the Ludwell–Paradise House's resident, Marie Louise Stewart. She had inherited the house on the death of her aunt, Kate Slater, who had resided in the house. Steward had sought to sell the house for two years. (Note: Steward, aware of his interest in restoring colonial Williamsburg buildings, had first approached Goodwin in early 1924 about the possible sale of the Ludwell–Paradise House.) After discussing the property with Brooks, Goodwin wrote Rockefeller on December 4, informing Rockefeller that he would need $8,000 ($145,489 in 2025) to purchase the building. Rockefeller sent a telegram to Goodwin on December 7 that authorized the purchase, referring to the house as an "antique" and signing the message "David's Father" – an instance of the anonymity about his involvement in the restoration project that Rockefeller maintained until June 1928. This would be the first building acquired with Rockefeller's funds for the Colonial Williamsburg project.

By January 19, 1927, the architectural firm Perry, Shaw and Hepburn had, at Rockefeller's behest, taken measurements of Bruton, the Ludwell–Paradise, and other historic Williamsburg buildings. Rockefeller's office determined that there were faults in the deed to the Ludwell–Paradise House's deed in January 1927, but Rockefeller opted to move forward with despite the title's uncertainty. A legal agreement dated February 15, 1927, stipulated that the purchase was predicated on Virginia Slater being the sole heir to her father and that the deed had been legally passed to the sellers.

After a May 1927 meeting at the Wythe House, Rockefeller authorized Goodwin to acquire further Williamsburg properties for the project. On June 2, 1927, Goodwin informed Chandler via letter of how the Ludwell–Paradise House had been purchased, describing "the cooperation of some of my friends who are interested in things colonial". The letter also sought to establish if the college would endorse further restoration efforts and take possession of restored or reconstructed properties. Rockefeller was not mentioned by name in this message and Chandler was asked to keep the letter's contents secret. Soon after, the Ludwell–Paradise House was deeded to the college. During the period of college ownership, the house saw several renovations, including the installation of a front porch. Ultimately, the college did not participate in Colonial Williamsburg as Goodwin envisioned, but the college's colonial-era Wren Building, President's House, and Brafferton were all restored as part of the project.

The house was deeded back from the college to the Colonial Williamsburg project on June 24, 1929; restoration had barely begun by early 1930. Significant archival and archaeological research was performed in preparation for the restoration undertaken by Perry, Shaw and Hepburn. Among the alterations were the replacement of the pedimented wooden door added in 1920s and the return of the cellar's entrance to its original location. Several of the changes made during the college's renovation of the building were undone, including alterations to the front door and windows and the porch. The restoration was completed during 1931.

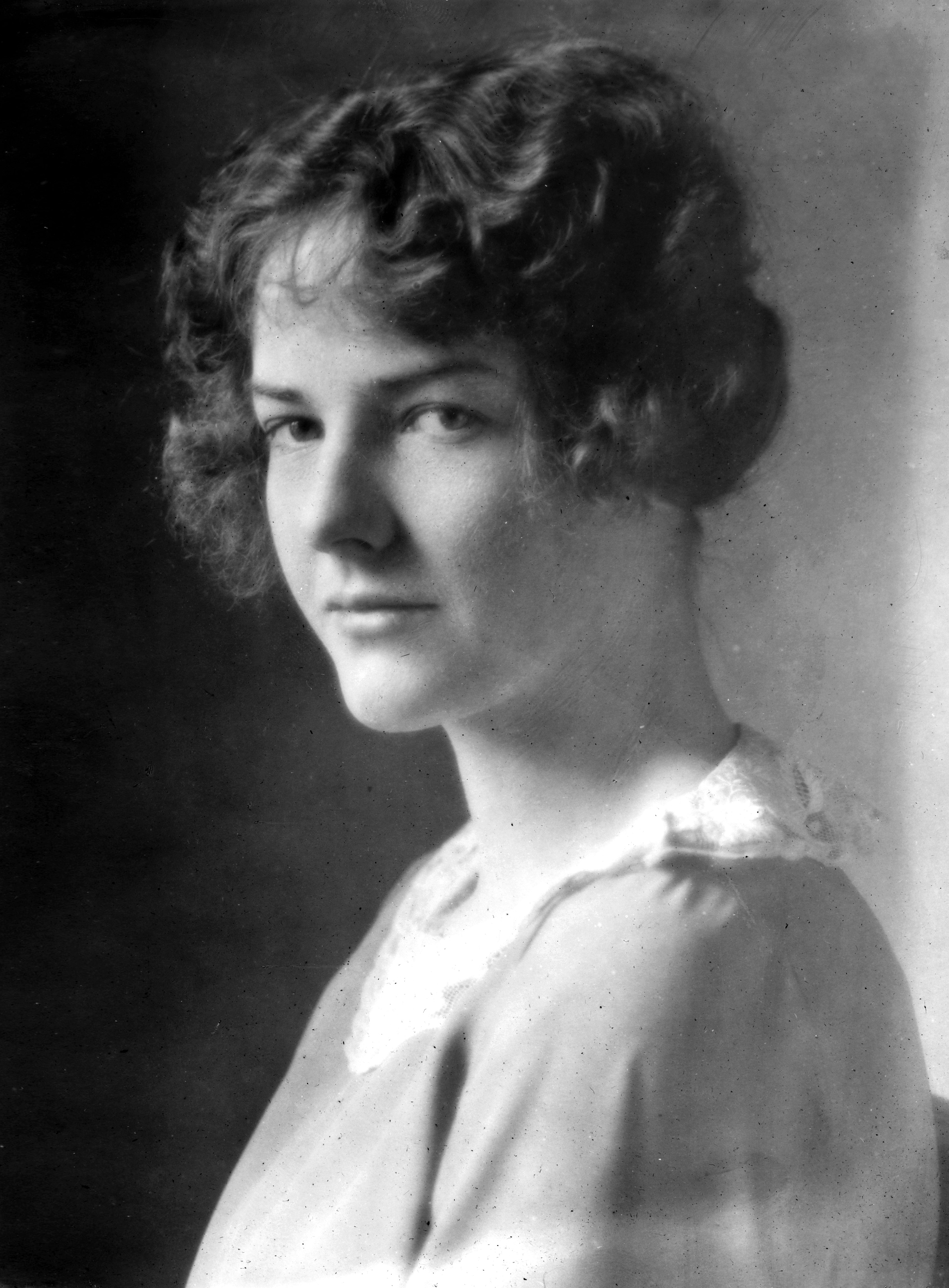
Abby Rockefeller (pictured here in 1900) collected folk art, donating works to Colonial Williamsburg that would be displayed in the Ludwell–Paradise House from 1935 to 1956.

Abby Rockefeller was an art collector, favoring both modern and folk art, though her husband strongly disliked the former. Both Rockefellers approved of displaying folk art in Colonial Williamsburg, with John D. Rockefeller Jr. saying that they felt the pieces were "in their proper setting". In March 1935, an exhibition of loaned portions of Abby Aldrich Rockfeller's folk art collection opened in the Ludwell–Paradise House. (Note: The displayed works included those of Amos Doolittle and Edward Hicks, as well as other 18th- and 19th-century works and cigar store Indians.) The loaned pieces, along with others from her collection, were given as a gift to Colonial Williamsburg in 1939. (Note: When the collection was given to Colonial Williamsburg in 1939, Abby Rockefeller gave 54 pieces to the Museum of Modern Art. Some of these pieces were subsequently given to the Metropolitan Museum of Art. David Rockefeller, working with both museums, returned these pieces to the collection in Williamsburg in 1956.) Curator Holger Cahill spent 18 months in the American South searching for additional colonial pieces to add to the Ludwell–Paradise House collection. In preparation for the folk art display, woodwork and interior items were sourced from another 18th-century house and installed in the Ludwell–Paradise House.

After his wife's 1948 death, John D. Rockefeller Jr. was unwilling to move the works from where his wife had hung them. He was eventually persuaded to move the folk art collection from the historic area. In 1954, the construction of a new, purpose-built museum building with funding from Rockefeller was announced. The Ludwell–Paradise House art exhibit closed on January 1, 1956, and the Abby Aldrich Rockefeller Folk Art Collection opened in the new building in 1957. In 1959, the house was again restored to its role as a rented private residence.

Several ghost stories center on Lucy Ludwell Paradise haunting the house, with one book on Williamsburg ghosts asserting that multiple residents testified to "hearing strange sounds [...] unattributable to any known physical source". A Colonial Williamsburg vice president, Rudolph Bares, and his wife, Pauline, lived in the Ludwell–Paradise House for several years in the 20th century. Rudolph Bares later said in an interview that he and his wife heard water running and splashing from an upstairs bathtub "maybe eight, 10, or 12 separate times" despite there not being any water in the tub. They drew the conclusion that it was Lucy Ludwell Paradise on the grounds that she was reputed to have taken multiple baths a day.

== Design ==
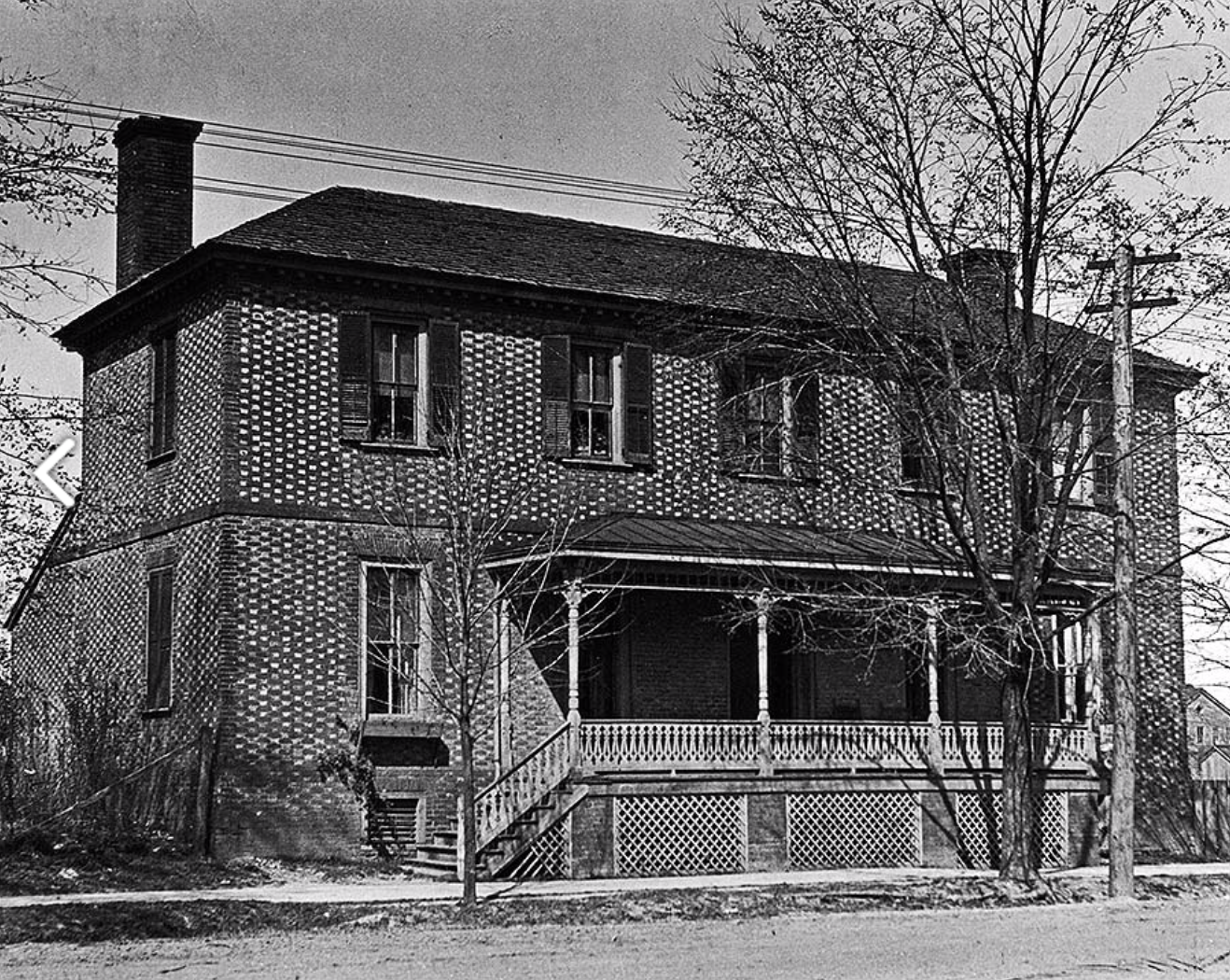
A 1926 photo taken by Earl Gregg Swem demonstrating its pre-restoration appearance, including the since-demolished porch

The Ludwell–Paradise House reflects the attitudes wealthy 18th-century Virginians had towards architecture, exemplified in what Colonial Williamsburg mason Josh Graml described as the building as "[s]olid, commodious and attractive, uncluttered by needless ornamentation". An example of early Georgian architecture, the Ludwell–Paradise House possesses a two-story high, one-floor deep front portion surmounted by a hip roof. Comprising five bays, the house is 60 feet (18 m) wide and just over 27 feet (8.2 m) tall.

There is a single-story shed along the length of the building's rear, deepening the first-floor space. The exterior of this shed's northern face is made from weatherboard rather than the brickwork present on all other exterior walls of the house. The shed's appearance led to speculation that it was a latter addition or that the whole house–including the shed–was originally designed as two-stories tall. However, the thickness of the basement walls, placement of the chimneys, and the brickwork all indicate that the structure was completed as designed in a single early 1750s building campaign. (Note: Either one or both of the house's chimneys may have come from the house that was constructed on the site sometime between 1680 and 1690.)

Framing for the roof and wall of the shed were refurbished with antique materials. The shed's northern exterior weatherboards were taken from a destroyed house that was on Boush Street in Norfolk. Most of the house's original interior woodwork has been lost. During 1935 work to prepare the Ludwell–Paradise House for its use as the folk art museum, 18th-century materials from Bolling House in Petersburg provided paneling for the southwestern ground-floor room.

A majority of colonial-era Williamsburg buildings, including the Ludwell—Paradise House, did not utilize timber roof trusses. (Note: Other brick buildings in Williamsburg–including the Wythe House, Palmer House, and Prentis Store–do utilize trusses for their roofs.) In his December 1927 message to Rockefeller requesting funds to purchase the house, Goodwin noted that a new roof was recently installed for $598 ($10,875 in 2025). Among Williamsburg building, chimney placement was not dependent on a structure's primary construction material. The brick Ludwell–Paradise House placed chimneys on the building's eastern and western ends, in common with the wooden Archibald Blair House and as opposed to the inside chimneys of the brick Wythe House. The chimneys were altered from their original pattern to a "modern form" until the 1931 restoration, when they were rebuilt from just below to the roof – where the original bricks had survived – using bricks from the Williamsburg Colonial Brick Company textured to match the originals.

As with other two-story Williamsburg residences built during the city's 1750s construction boom, the house is built of brick, a prestigious material suggestive of permanence previously reserved for the city's public buildings. The building's exterior brickwork is laid in Flemish bond. In this styling, the bricks are alternated between those laid with ends facing out ("headers") and those laid lengthwise ("stretchers"). In the Ludwell–Paradise House's case, the style is further accented by headers being glazed. As in other Flemish bond Williamsburg buildings, adjacent unglazed headers were utilized to maintain the pattern when necessary for completing courses of brick like those terminating at the front door and the window above it. Whiffen commented that this masonry preserved the building's front from what "would amount to austerity" due to the "wide expanses of wall between the windows".

The Colonial Williamsburg restoration also saw the reconstruction of outbuildings, including an outside kitchen and a stable. Brick foundations, including some colonial in appearance, for outbuildings were discovered during archaeological excavations behind the house in early 1931, with one building posited as a kitchen. The 18th-century Frenchman's Map of Williamsburg also indicated a structure on that location. Outdoor kitchens were a common way to keep the heat of cooking away from the main building and other Williamsburg residences feature similar structures. (Note: The kitchen's architecture follows the pattern of an 18th-century smokehouse, particularly that present at Tazewell Hall. The excavated foundations of the original structure indicated that it utilized English bond brickwork, with the Colonial Williamsburg reconstruction following this pattern. Weatherboard was used in the structure's siding, as was moulding from a Surry County property.) During the 1930s, the carriage house (also called the "coach house") across the adjacent garden held two carriages which were used by hostesses for transport. During college ownership, a wellhead was installed at a site on the garden; the Colonial Williamsburg restoration removed this wellhead and rebuilt one on the well's original location.

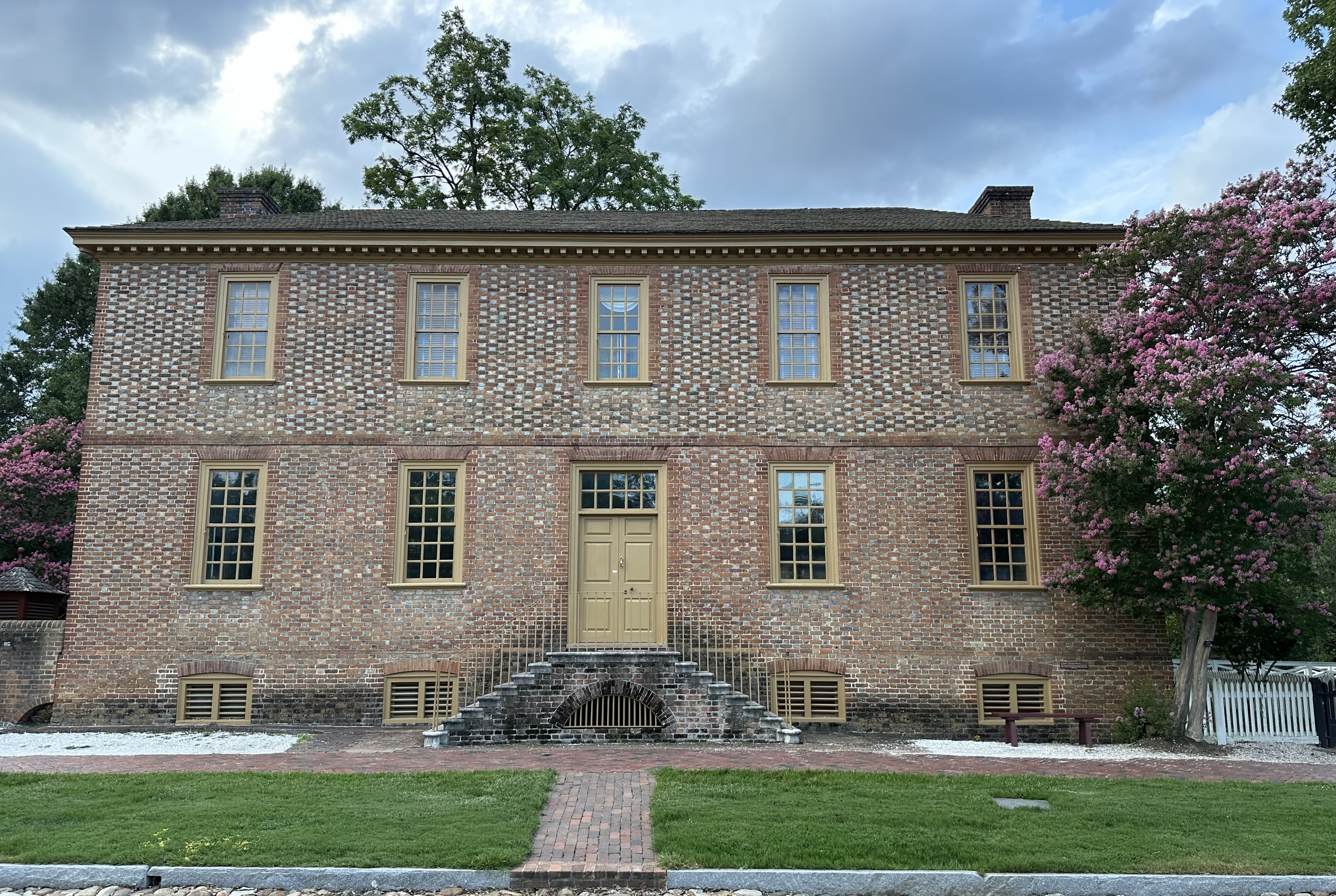
Front of house from Duke of Gloucester Street

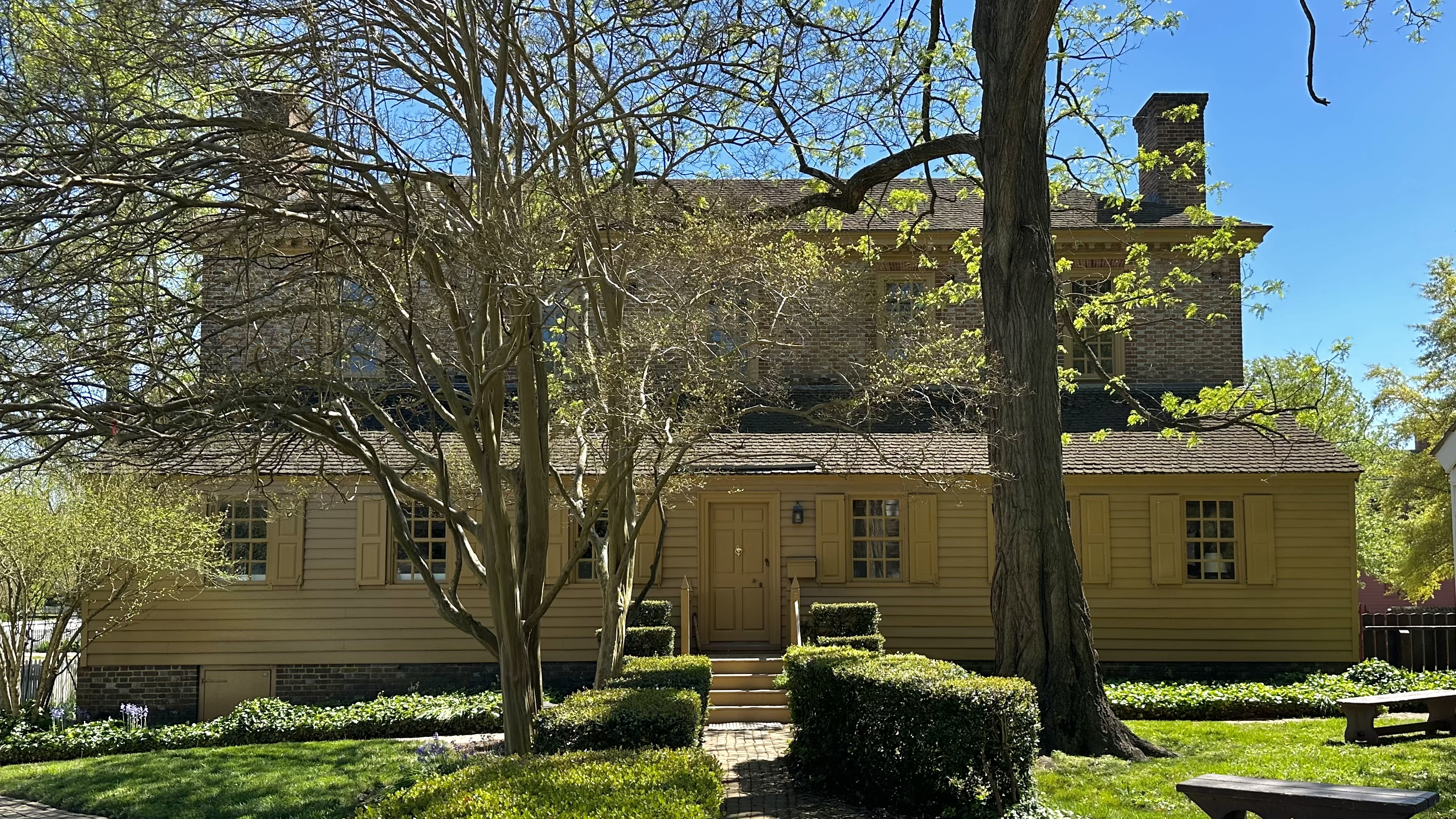
One-story shed on rear of the house

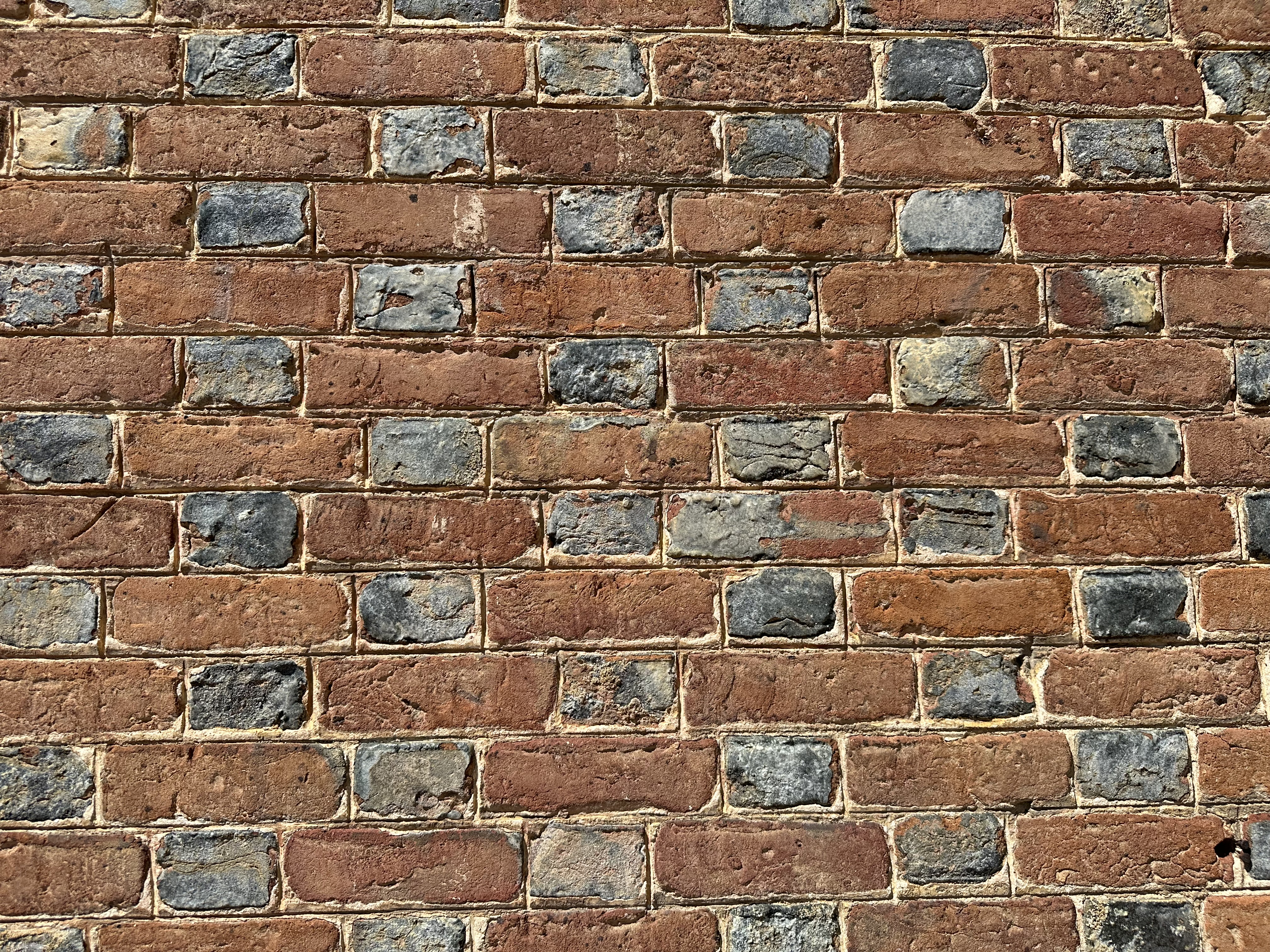
Flemish bond brickwork on the house

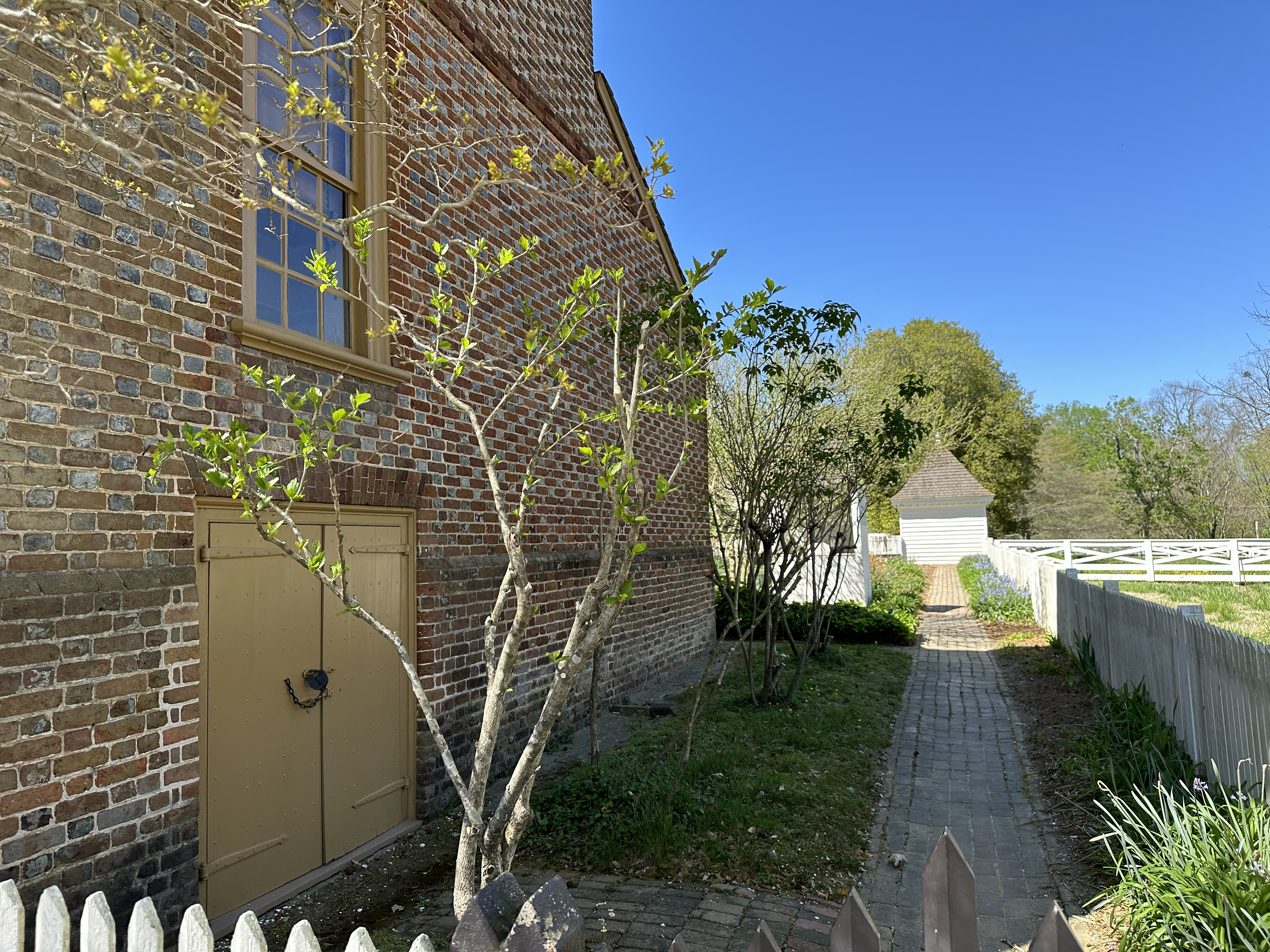
Cellar door at restored eastern wall location, wellhead and toolhouse visible down path

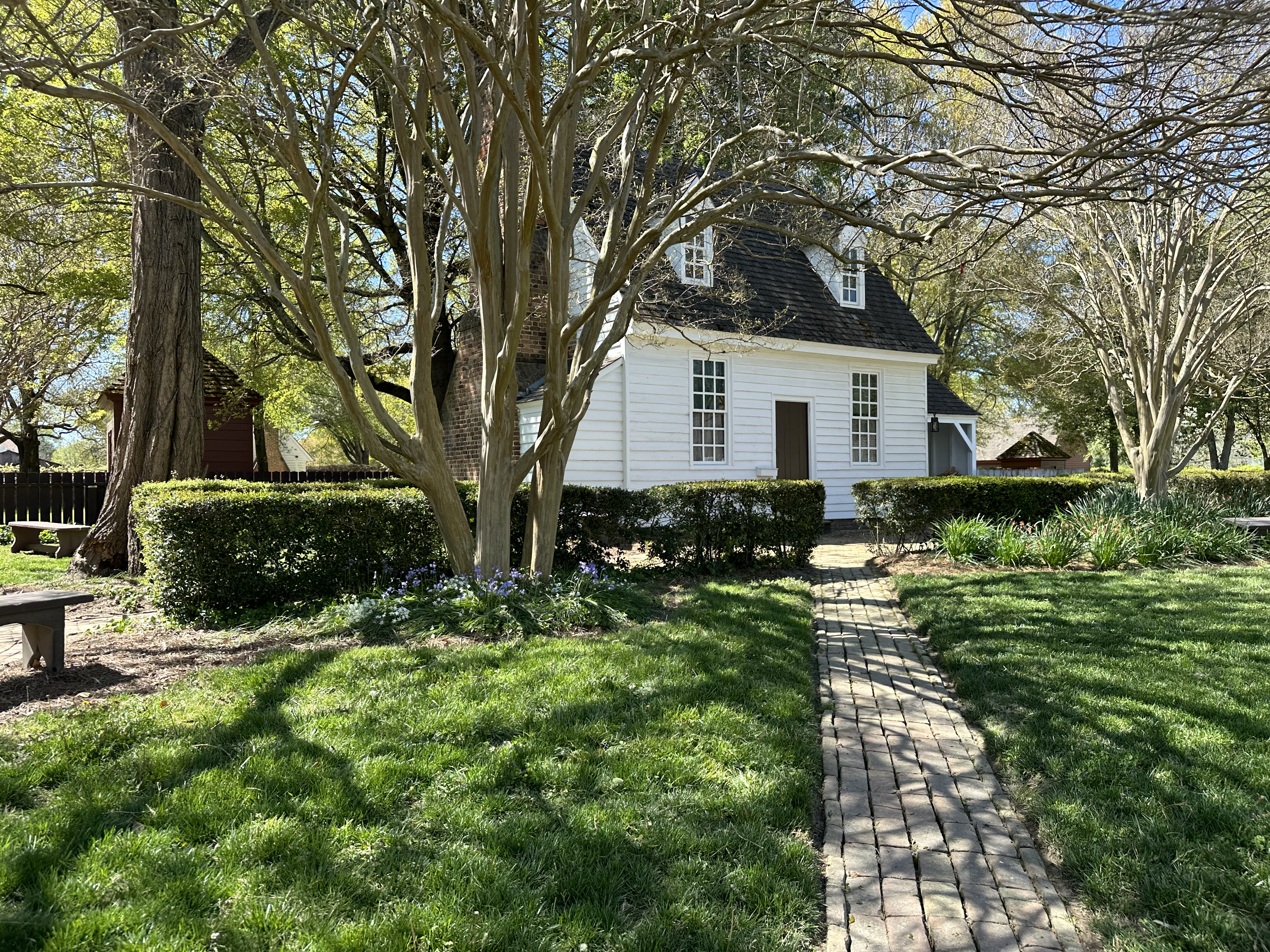
Kitchen and garden

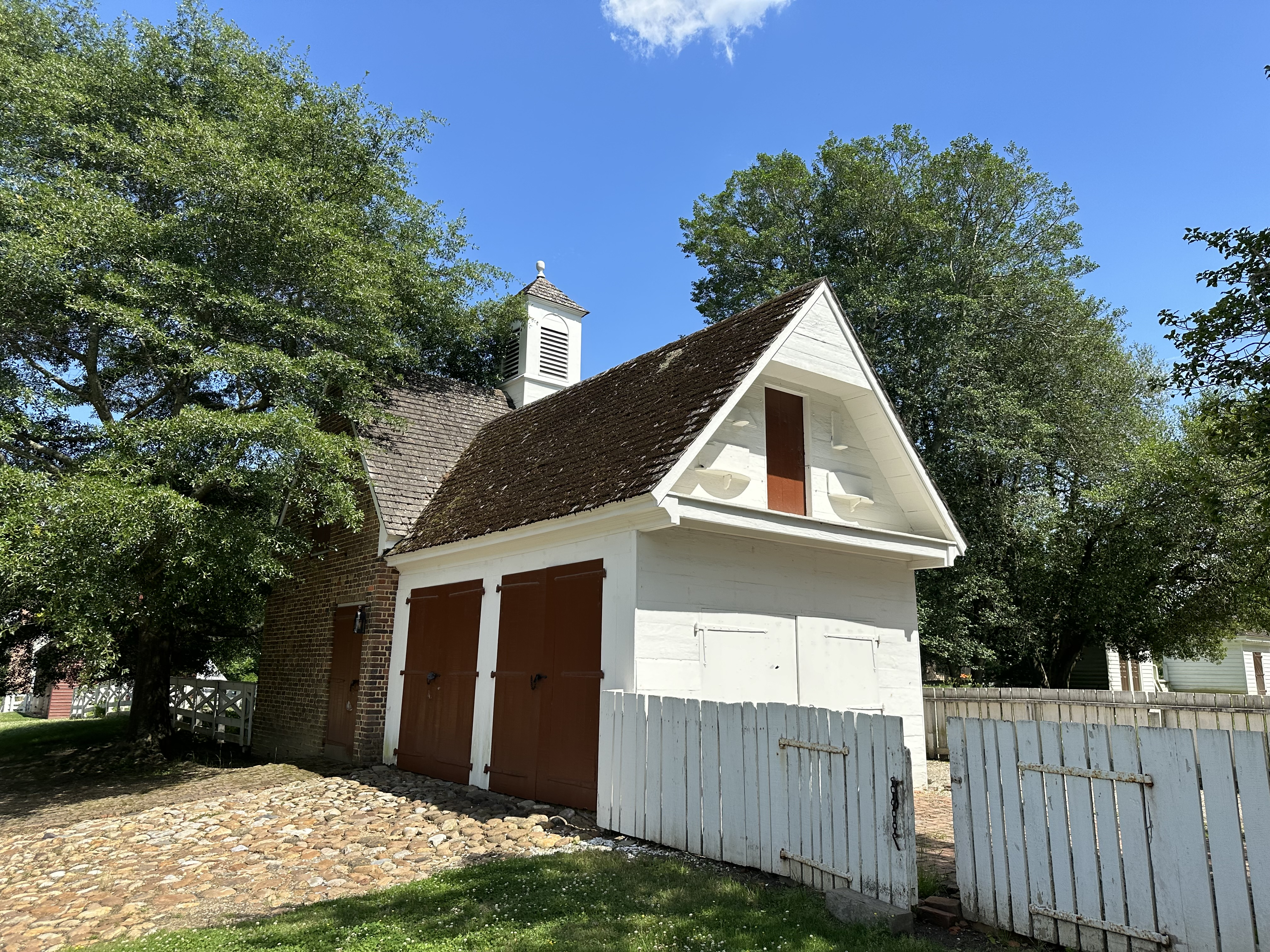
Stable
