= Lucy Ludwell Paradise =

Hostess and early American Eastern Orthodox Christian (1852–1814)

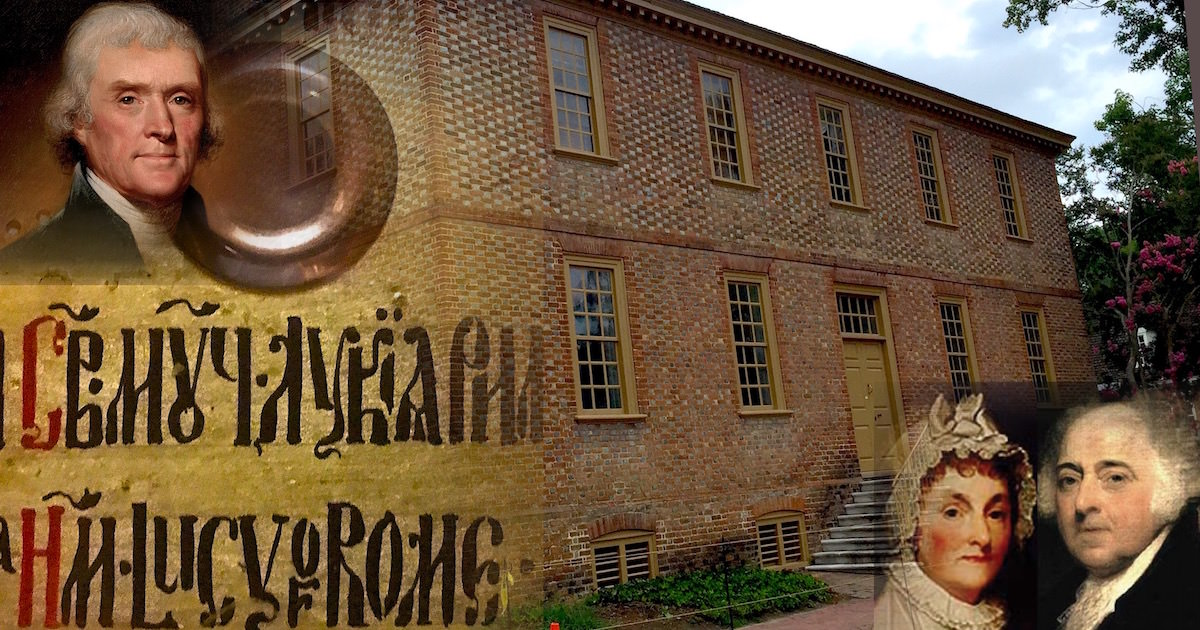
The Ludwell–Paradise House in Colonial Williamsburg, Virginia. Lucy Ludwell Paradise lived here c. 1805–1812.

Lucy Ludwell Paradise (1752–1814) was a Virginia-born American who lived much of her life in London. She was the wife of the Anglo-Greek linguist John Paradise (1743–1795) and the daughter of Philip Ludwell III (1716–1767).

== Life ==
Lucy Ludwell was born in Virginia as the third surviving daughter of Philip Ludwell III and his wife Frances Grymes Ludwell. John Blair, mayor of Williamsburg and former member of the House of Burgesses, recorded in his diary that Lucy was baptized on November 8, 1752.

She sailed to London in 1760 with her father and two older sisters, Hannah and Frances. In April 1762, the three daughters were received into the Orthodox Church. Their father Philip died in London in 1767, leaving his friend Peter Paradise as guardian of his daughters. One sister died, and in 1768 her eldest sister, 30-year old Hannah Ludwell married William Lee, a Virginian who with his sister Lucy had lived with the Ludwells until 1763, and became a tobacco merchant, then a diplomat for the American colonies. In 1769, 16 year old Lucy married Peter's son, John Paradise.

In 1787, John and Lucy came to the United States of America, where they visited their brother-in-law William Lee (by then a widower with a son and two daughters) who was living at the Ludwell family's Green Spring Plantation near Williamsburg. They also visited with George Washington at Mount Vernon.

Lucy corresponded with many eminent Americans of the time, including Thomas Jefferson, for whom she purchased books in Europe. By 1801, as noted in a letter to then President-elect Jefferson, Lucy's husband and two daughters had died. In 1805 she returned to the United States and lived in her father's townhouse on Duke of Gloucester Street in Williamsburg (now called the Ludwell–Paradise House). Plagued by increasing mental instability, she was placed in the Eastern Hospital in Williamsburg, America's first mental asylum. She died on April 24, 1814.
