= Philip Ludwell Jr. =

Colonial Virginian politician

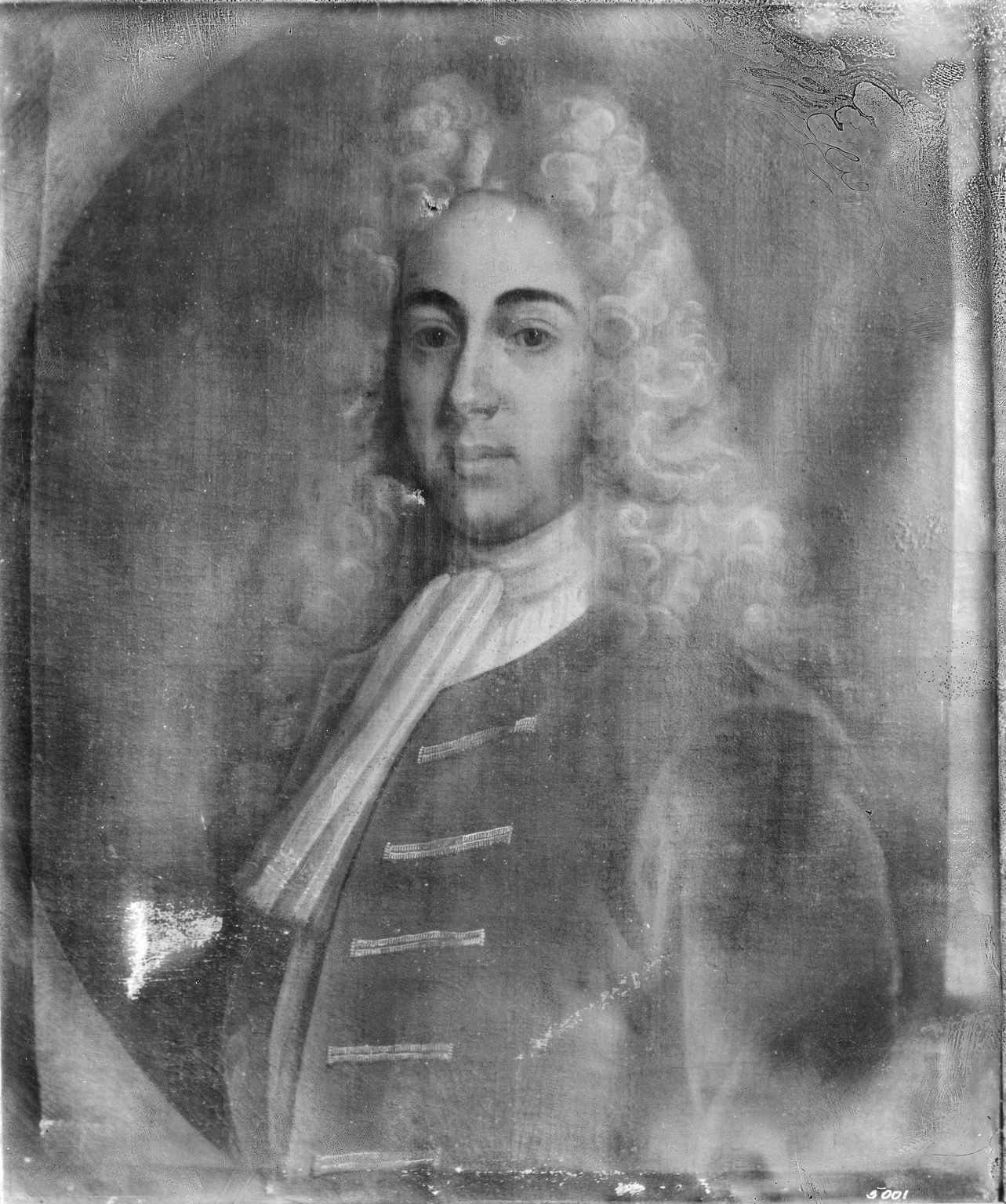

Member of the Virginia Governor's Council
- In office 1702-1726

Member of the Virginia House of Burgesses representing Jamestown
- In office 1696–1697
- Preceded by: William Sherwood
- Succeeded by: Lewis Burwell

Member of the Virginia House of Burgesses representing James City County
- In office 1698–1700 Serving with Thomas Cowles, Henry Duke
- Preceded by: Michael Sherman
- Succeeded by: James Bray

Personal details
- Born: c.1672 Fairfield plantation, Gloucester County, Colony of Virginia
- Died: January 11, 1727 James City County, Colony of Virginia
- Spouse: Hannah Harrison
- Children: Philip Ludwell III
- Parent: Philip Ludwell (father)
- Occupation: planter, politician
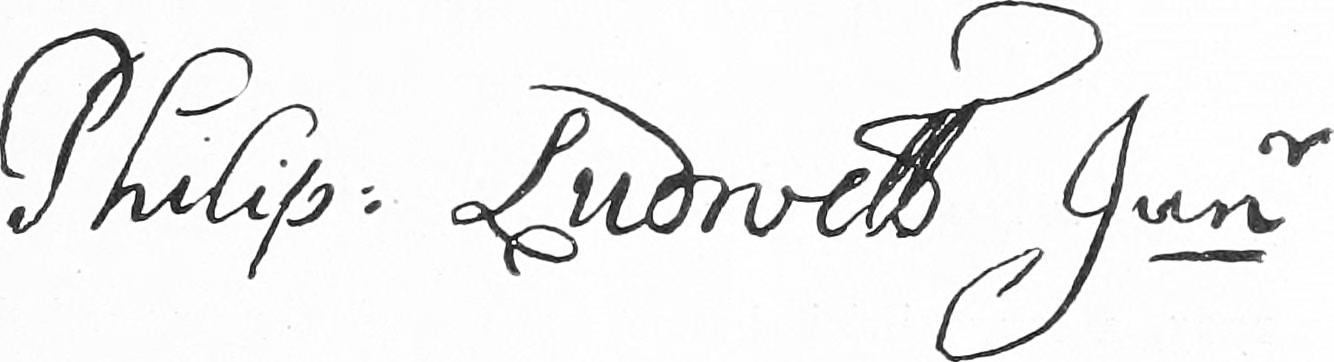
- Signature

Philip Ludwell Jr. (c.1672 – c.1727) was a Virginia planter and politician who served several terms in the Virginia House of Burgesses, and became an important figure in the colony's new capital at Williamsburg as well as with the newly established College of William & Mary. As had his father Philip Ludwell, and as would son Philip Ludwell III, this man served on the Virginia Governor's Council and operated plantations using enslaved labor.

== Early and family life ==
Coat of Arms of Philip Ludwell Jr.

The younger Philip Ludwell was born in the Virginia colony to the formerly widowed Lucy Higginson Burwell; his immigrant father becoming her second husband. He was a boy when the family fled Bacon's Rebellion, which his father helped crush, but which damaged many of the family landholdings. His maternal grandfather Col. Higginson had earlier led the local James City County militia, and he had a sister, Lucy Ludwell. When their mother died, the elder Ludwell moved his young family to Rich Neck plantation, established by their uncle Thomas Ludwell (who probably died in 1678, with his brother as sole heir). His father remarried in 1680, to the widow of the late Governor William Berkeley, whose nephew had led and then died during the rebellion. The thrice-married Lady Berkeley was the richest person in the colony (with lands in both Virginia and what later became North Carolina) and a formidable force. She died by 1695, without children from any of her husbands, so Philip Ludlow Sr. inherited her vast lands, which he ultimately left to his only son, though he also permanently moved to England by about 1700.

In 1697, Philip Ludwell Jr. married Hannah Harrison, daughter of Benjamin Harrison, who like his father was a member of the Virginia Council of state. They had three children, including Philip Ludwell III and Hannah Ludwell.

== Career ==
In 1694, Philip Ludwell Jr. reached legal age, and his widowed father soon entrusted all the Virginia plantations he had inherited from his brother and from his second wife to young Philip, and ultimately permanently returned to England, after Lady Berkeley's death and establishing his son.

In 1696, burgess James Sherwood died and voters in Jamestown County elected Ludwell to succeed him in the House of Burgesses, though the following year his half brother Lewis Burwell represented Jamestown, while voters in James City County elected (and re-elected) Ludwell as one of their two burgesses. Ludwell lived at the Green Spring Plantation and also secured a patent for a house lot in the colonial capital, Jamestown. In May 1702 he was named to the Council of State and continued in that position for decades, basically until his death.

In 1709, he and William Byrd II of Westover plantation were commissioned to draw the boundary line between Virginia and Carolina. The following year, 1710, Lt. Gov. Alexander Spotswood appointed Ludwell deputy auditor general for the Virginia colony. However, the relationship between the two grew strained, and Spotswood alleged that Ludwell had encroached upon the Governor's Land (which his father had leased long before).

In 1715, Philip Ludwell became the James City County lieutenant as well as a justice of the county court. He also won election to the Bruton Parish vestry, became a trustee of the College of William and Mary, as well as served as rector of the new institution for a time. However, Ludwell and his brother in law James Blair came at odds with Governor Francis Nicholson, and Ludwell lost his deputy auditor general post.

Philip Ludwell died on January 11, 1727, with his 11-year-old son Philip Ludwell III as his primary heir.
