= Philip Ludwell III =

Politician, translator, and first convert to Eastern Orthodoxy in the New World

Phillip C. Ludwell III
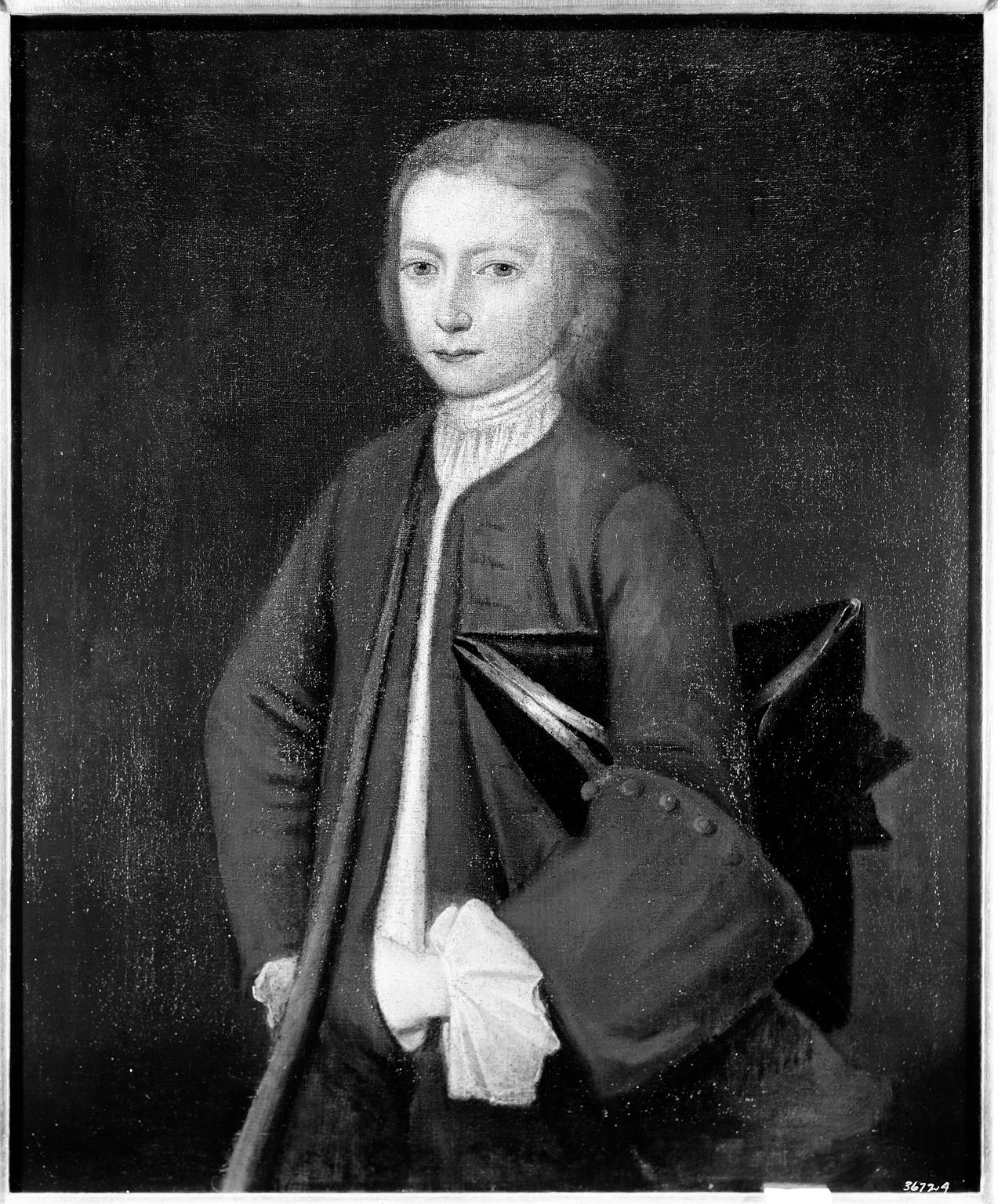

Member of the Virginia Governor's Council

Colonel
- In office 1751-1760

Member of the Virginia House of Burgesses representing Jamestown
- In office 1742–1752
- Preceded by: Lewis Burwell
- Succeeded by: Edward Champion Travis

Personal details
- Born: December 28, 1716
- Died: March 25, 1767 (Aged 50)
- Spouse: Frances Grymes
- Children: 4 daughters, including Lucy Ludwell Paradise
- Parent(s): Philip Ludwell Jr. and Hannah Harrison
- Education: College of William & Mary
- Occupation: Lawyer, Planter, Soldier, Politician

Philip Cottington Ludwell III (December 28, 1716 – March 25, 1767) was a Virginia planter, soldier and politician who twice represented Jamestown in the House of Burgesses, and like his father and grandfather of the same name also served on the Virginia Governor's Council. Like his grandfather decades earlier, he left his plantations in the care of overseers in 1760 and permanently moved to London, England. In 1738, Ludwell had become the earliest known convert to Eastern Orthodox Christianity in North America, and would translate several religious works from Greek into English.

== Early life and education ==
Coat of Arms of Philip Ludwell, III

Born at Green Spring plantation in James City County, to the former Hannah Harrison and her husband Philip Ludwell Jr., Philip Ludwell III was their only son and heir, and orphaned at age 15. His grandfather Philip Ludwell (c. 1638–c. 1723) had been a colonial soldier and planter who married the widow of Virginia's colonial Governor William Berkeley, and himself became Governor of the Province of Carolina 1691–94), and also served as speaker of the Virginia House of Burgesses. A member of the First Families of Virginia, Ludwell was a cousin of George Washington's wife Martha.

Ludwell graduated from the College of William & Mary and married Frances Grymes (d. 1753) of Morattico plantation on the Northern Neck of Virginia shortly before he officially became an adult and gained control of his inheritance. Her father Charles Grymes was a burgess as was an uncle and some cousins. They had four daughters, three of whom survived their mother: Hannah Philippa Ludwell (1737-1784), who would marry Virginia merchant and American diplomat William Lee; Frances, who did not marry and died before her father's estate was settled; and Lucy, who married her guardian's son, John Paradise.

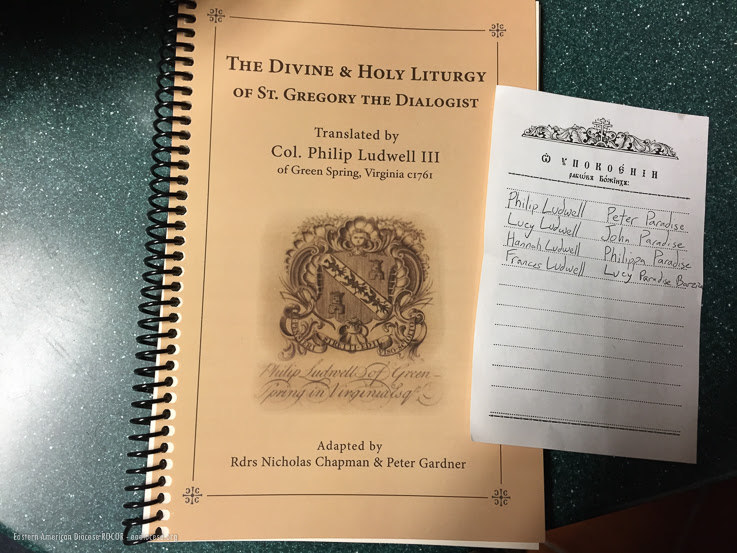
The Divine and Holy Liturgy of St. Gregory the Diologist translated by Col. Philip Ludwell III published by ROCOR

== Career ==
Upon reaching his majority, Ludwell inherited a town house in Williamsburg and several plantations including Green Spring, Rich Neck Plantation near the capital at Williamsburg, and Chippokes, south of the James River. Ludlow assisted Governor Robert Dinwiddie (1751-1756) and leased a large parcel of the Governor's Land.

Ludwell also held various offices in James City County and Jamestown, including leading the local militia (hence the "Colonel" title). Jamestown voters twice elected him as their representative in the House of Burgesses, which met sporadically in Williamsburg during this period.

Seven years after his wife's death, as tensions grew between Britain and her American Colonies, Ludwell placed his plantations in the care of overseers, including Cary Wilkinson, and sailed to London with his three daughters, whom he educated, as well as oversaw the education of children of other Virginia planters.

Ludwell had been received into the Orthodox church on December 31, 1738 (Old Style) (Note: This date is cited using the Julian calendar, which is January 11, 1739 in the Gregorian calendar. This date is calculated using the Julian calendar at the time, which would be 11 days behind the Gregorian calendar, compared to the 13 days delay today.) in London, England. A special dispensation had been granted by the church's Holy Synod in Russia. He was also given exceptional permission to continue to attend Anglican services in Virginia, since the dispensation recognized that "apart from the Province of Pennsylvania, all religions but Protestantism are banned."

Although in declining health at the end of his life, Ludwell translated The Orthodox Confession of Peter Mogila, Metropolitan of Kiev, from Latin, and published this book in London in 1762. He also translated, from Greek, the three principal liturgies of the Eastern Orthodox Church: The Divine Liturgy of St John Chrysostom, the Divine Liturgy of St Basil the Great, and The Divine and Holy Liturgy of St Gregory the Dialogist, which is used during Great Lent and is commonly called the Liturgy of the Presanctified Gifts today.

== Death and legacy ==
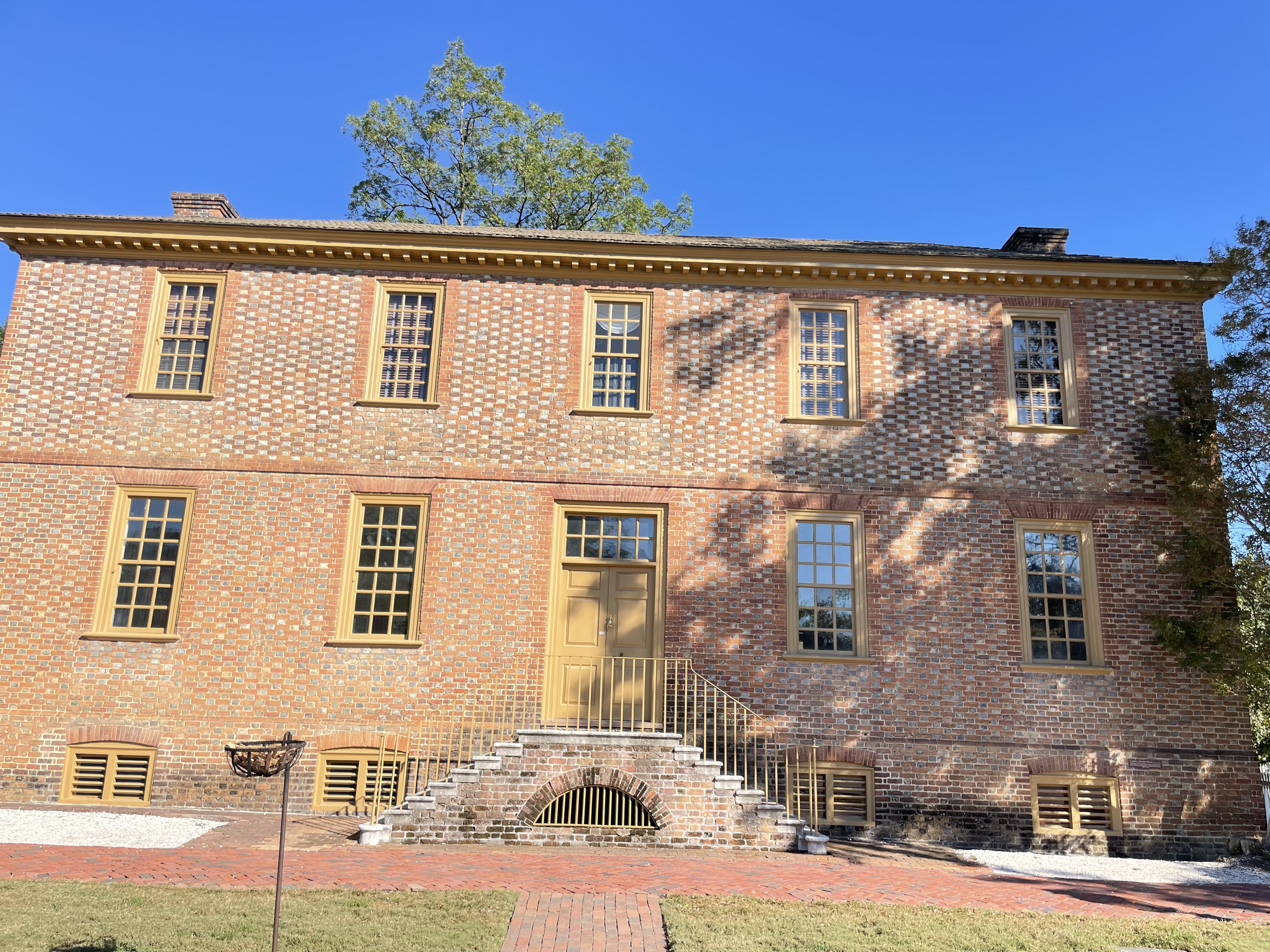
The Ludwell-Paradise House, built by Ludwell in 1753, still stands in Colonial Williamsburg.

After a long period of declining health, Ludwell wrote his will on February 28, 1767. He died in London on March 25, 1767. His funeral was served at the Russian Church in London on Monday, March 30, 1767. He was buried at Bow Church.

The Eparchy of Eastern America and New York of the Russian Orthodox Church Outside Russia remembers him liturgically with an annual panihida service.

Four of his former properties are now (directly or indirectly) part of the National Register of Historic Places. His elder daughter Hannah never returned to the United States, but her husband did with their son, William Ludwell Lee, who tore down the old house after his father's death and would at his death emancipate the slaves at the Green Spring plantation he had inherited, as well as attempted to arrange for their education. However, the house he built was destroyed in the American Civil War, and the College of William and Mary never established a school, but instead litigated with Lee's executors. Part of his Green Spring Plantation is now in Colonial National Historical Park. Her sister Lucy Ludwell Paradise inherited Rich Neck Plantation and upon returning to Virginia as a widow, also lived in the Ludlows' Williamsburg town house c. 1805–1812. The latter is still a private residence within Colonial Williamsburg, now known as the Ludwell-Paradise House. Extensive archeological work has been performed at Rich Neck Plantation, and Chippoke Plantation State Park now includes an open-air farm museum demonstrating life in the era.
