= Lake Matoaka =

Lake in Williamsburg, Virginia, US

Coordinates: 37°15′58″N 76°43′24″W

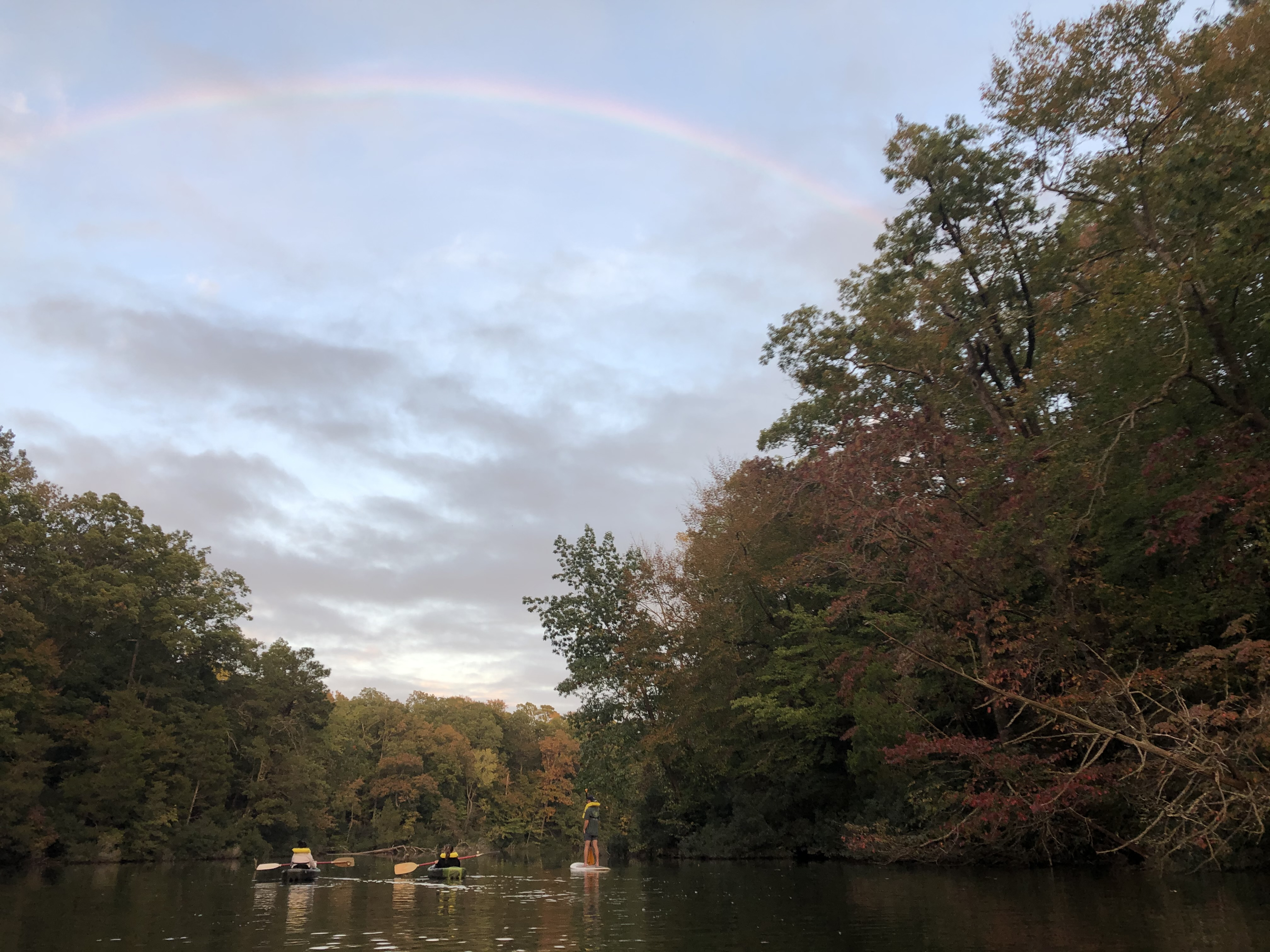
Paddleboarding and kayaking on Lake Matoaka, 2020

Lake Matoaka is a mill pond on the campus of the College of William & Mary in Williamsburg, Virginia, located in the College Woods. Originally known both as Rich Neck Pond for the surrounding Rich Neck Plantation and Ludwell's Mill Pond for Philip Ludwell who owned it, Lake Matoaka was constructed around 1700 to power a gristmill. The pond was renamed after acquisition by the college to bear the Powhatan name for Pocahontas. The lake was acquired by William & Mary in the 1920s. Construction projects by the Civilian Conservation Corps, college, and others have contributed to the lake becoming a site for outdoor entertainment and recreation.

== Description ==
Lake Matoaka is located on the western edge of the College of William & Mary's campus in Williamsburg, a city in southeastern Tidewater Virginia. Bordering the eastern portion of the roughly 150 hectare College Woods, the body of water is roughly 0.17 km^{2} (0.066 mi^{2}) with a maximum depth of 4.8 m (16 ft). Water from the lake empties into College Creek. The dam on the south side of the lake is traversed by Jamestown Road.

The lake is heavily populated by fish and turtles despite poor water quality. The "Near Side" is adjacent to developed campus and has in recent years been a prothonotary warbler breeding site. Also on the Near Side are the Keck Environmental Field Lab, the renovated original amphitheater, and the ruins of the second amphitheater. A small boathouse operates from this side, with paths and bridges connecting the lakeside to campus near the William & Mary Police Department offices.

The core samples from sediment in Lake Matoaka have been studied for the lakebed's capacity to retain historic atmospheric information. Among the discoveries were microscopic spheroidal carbonaceous particles left by fly ash from coal-fire furnaces in the Eighteenth Century during Williamsburg's industrial and political peak and lead particulates traced to production in 19th-century Galena, Illinois.

== History ==
While serving as deputy secretary of the Colony of Virginia, Philip Ludwell purchased the property of Rich Neck Plantation in Archer's Hope Swamp in Middle Plantation, now Williamsburg. In 1693, letters patent issued by King William III and Queen Mary II chartered the College of William & Mary in Virginia, establishing the boundary of the college property on the edge of Archer's Hope Swamp and the Rich Neck property. Some time in the early 18th century, a gristmill and the mill pond to power it were constructed for Ludwell by damming College Creek. During this period, the mill pond was known as Rich Neck or Ludwell's Mill Pond. The original mill is thought to have been destroyed in 1863, though a rebuilt mill may have operated through the 1920s. This later mill is reported to have burned in 1945. The location of some of the plantation's structures have been located by identifying concentrations of dispersed bricks.

The College of William & Mary acquired the property containing the lake and much of the College Woods in the 1920s, renaming the former to Lake Matoaka after the Powhatan name for Pocahontas. By 1933, this area was designated to become one of the few Virginia state parks and was inaugurated as Matoaka Park in October 1934. The still-preserved College Woods are now the largest contiguous forest in Williamsburg.

The arrival of a Civilian Conservation Corps (CCC) encampment in the fall of 1933 on the college's campus saw many new structures and trails built around Lake Matoaka. While on the campus, the CCC men received educational support from the college. The CCC constructed Cary Field, and in 1935 a boathouse on Lake Matoaka–this latter structure rapidly falling into disuse and decay by the 1950s. Additionally, the CCC also constructed more than 10 mi (16 km) of trails, many of which survive unimproved, and bridle paths along the shore of the lake. When heavy rains washed out the lake's spillway in 1937, CCC men rebuilt it.

Recreation on Lake Matoaka previously permitted non-boating activities in the water, with winter sports recorded as including ice skating in 1940. Following the sharp degradation of water quality in the 1980s due to multiple sewage spills and other factors, swimming in the lake was prohibited. The lake still rates as hypereutrophic with annual algal blooms, resulting in its continued closure to swimmers. A portion of Lake Matoaka that extends higher into campus and is partially dammed by trails is known by the neologism "Grim Dell," a corruption of Crim Dell referencing the neck's extremely poor water quality.

=== Amphitheaters ===
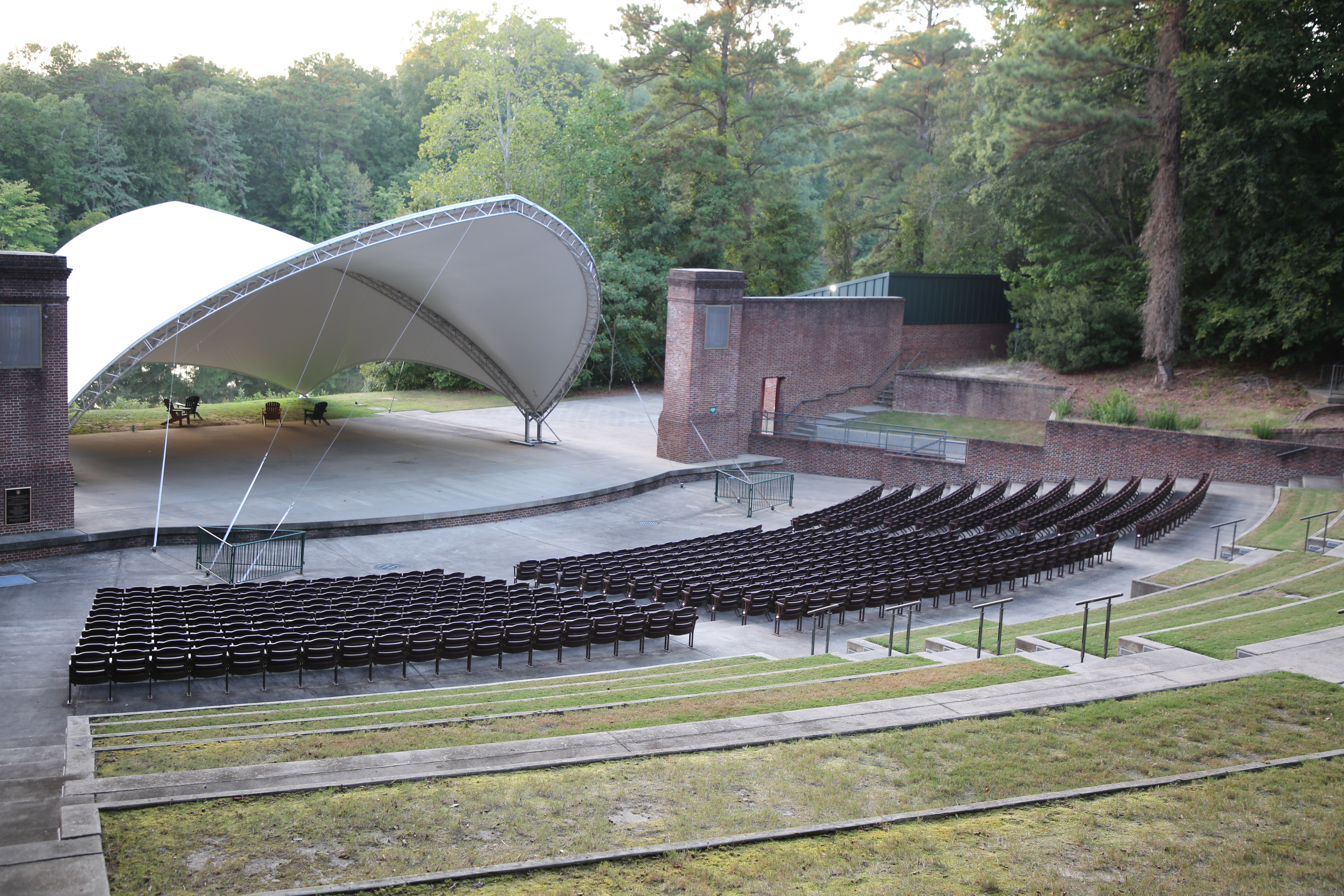
Matoaka Amphitheater located on the shore of Lake Matoaka, 2022

The Martha Wren Briggs Amphitheatre at Lake Matoaka is an amphitheater with space for up to 2,000 patrons. The amphitheater was built by the Jamestown Corporation in 1947 to host The Common Glory, a historical outdoor drama by Paul Green recounting the story of Williamsburg during the American Revolution which also lent its name for the amphitheater's original name. The play would play through the summer from 1947 until 1976. With the folding of the Jamestown Corporation, the amphitheater was acquired by the college in 1976 and renovated in 2006.

A second amphitheater was constructed in 1956 to host another Jamestown Corporation play, The Founders, which told the story of the Jamestown Settlement. This second amphitheater, known as the Cove Amphitheater, could host 1,700 attendees. The play and the amphitheater closed after two years. The Cove Amphitheater is now rewilded and overgrown without restoration or maintenance, though its dressing room has survived as an art studio.
