= William Lee (diplomat) =

American diplomat and politician

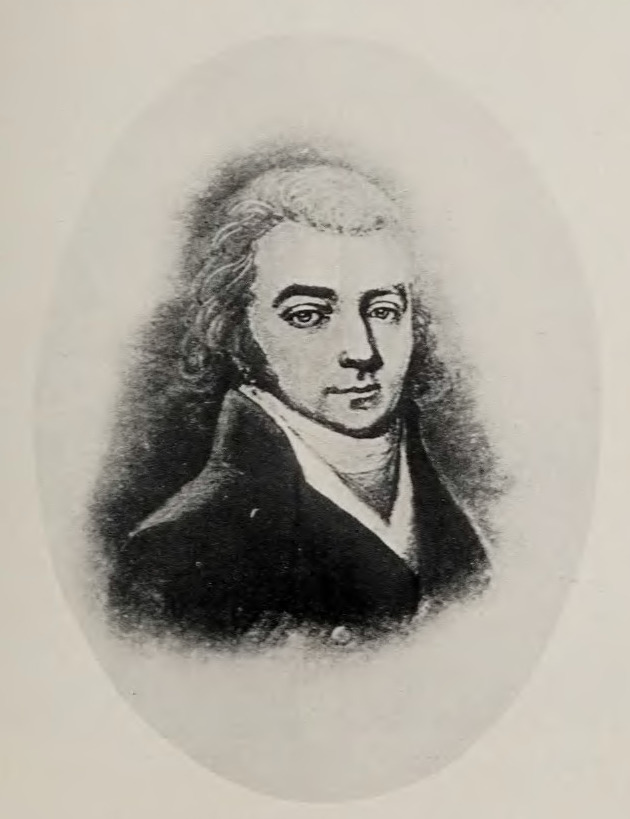

Member of the Virginia Senate representing Elizabeth City, Warwick and York Counties
- In office May 5, 1783 – October 17, 1785
- Preceded by: David Jameson
- Succeeded by: Hugh Nelson

Personal details
- Born: August 31, 1739 Westmoreland County, Virginia
- Died: June 27, 1795 (aged 55) Westmoreland County, Colony of Virginia
- Spouse: Hannah P. Ludwell (m. 1769)
- Parents: Thomas Lee (father); Hannah Harrison Ludwell Lee (mother)
- Relatives: Arthur Lee (1740–1792) (brother); Francis Lightfoot Lee (1734–1797) (brother); Richard Henry Lee (1732–1794) (brother)
- Education: Oxford University
- Occupation: diplomat, merchant, soldier, legislator, justice of the peace

William Lee (August 31, 1739 – June 27, 1795) was a Virginia merchant and member of the Lee Family of Virginia who served as an American diplomat during the Revolutionary War, became a plantation owner through marriage, and represented Elizabeth City, Warwick and York Counties in the Virginia Senate. His son William Ludwell Lee (who survived him only by a decade) became an early Lee family genealogist as well as left a will freeing his slaves.

== Background ==
Born at Stratford Hall Plantation in Westmoreland County, Virginia, to planter Thomas Lee (1690–1750) and his wife, Hannah Harrison Ludwell (1701–1750). He could trace his descent from Richard Lee I, a merchant and colonial officeholder who had founded the influential Virginia family in the previous century. Lee was thus born into the First Families of Virginia and received a private education appropriate to his class. Two of his elder brothers, Richard Henry Lee (1732–1794) and Francis Lightfoot Lee (1734–1797) were planters and politicians active within the Virginia General Assembly and then the Continental Congress, and his younger brother Arthur Lee (1740–1792) would also become an American diplomat and politician. Complicating matters, relations shared the same name, including two men who died childless: the founder Richard Lee I's son William (1651–1696) who held Northumberland county offices, distant cousin named William Lee of Northampton County, the son of his great uncle Hancock Lee and Mary Kendall. Unless this merchant returned to Virginia between 1779 and 1781, a different man won election and re-election to in the Virginia House of Delegates, representing Northumberland County as the American Revolutionary War ended.

Lee family Coat of Arms

== London merchant and politician ==
As a younger brother, Lee did not expect to inherit plantations from his parents, but after completing his education moved to London and became a mercantile agent for Virginia in the tobacco trade. Beginning in 1760, he and his sister Alice (who was trying to escape an unfortunate marriage to Billy Shippen) lived in London with their mother's widower brother, Col. Philip Ludwell III and his three daughters (the Ludwell family included no sons). Ludwell owned Green Spring Plantation in James City County, Virginia, once the vast estate along the James River owned by colonial governor William Berkeley, a mentor of their ancestor Richard Lee I. Enslaved labor on that plantation (like at many Lee family plantations) grew tobacco (prices of which were depressed during his ownership), as well as indigo, wheat, corn, cotton and flax, among other crops.

William Lee returned to Virginia for five years, 1763–1768, to work at Stratford and assist his eldest brother Col. Philip Lee (1717–1775, already a member of the Governor's Council), then sailed to London en route to making his fortune in India or elsewhere. However, after hearing of Col. Ludwell's death in London in 1767, William Lee stayed in that city, courted his heiress cousin Hannah Philippa Ludwell (30 years old at the time and known for an independent disposition), and married her on March 7, 1769. By this time, her sister Frances had also died, and Hannah Ludwell Lee worked to ensure that she (and not her remaining sister Lucy who at age 16 married London dilettante John Paradise months later) would inherit the 7000 acre Green Spring plantation, but she did not want to return to Virginia. While Hannah proved to be shrewd in understanding the purchasing desires and needs of planters' wives (thus helping to gain business from their husbands), William Lee also made some unwise decisions concerning her Virginia plantations firing the long-time overseer and antagonizing the widely respected Robert Carter Nicholas who was administering Philip Ludlow's will. Thus, the family stayed in London and William Lee began a career as a tobacco merchant, as well as raising the family described below, and superintending the education in England of the sons of their brother Richard Henry Lee, Thomas Lee and Ludwell Lee, both of whom proved good students.

After joining the Haberdashers Company, Lee was appointed Sheriff of London for 1774 after Sheriff Plomer resigned. The other sheriff for that year, Stephen Sayes, was also American born. The position gave them the opportunity to press in high places the American case for less taxation and more representation. After his year as sheriff, William Lee was elected an Alderman, but could not fulfill his dream to become a member of Parliament. Nonetheless, he continued his campaign for American rights.

Lee became an agent of the Continental Congress during the American Revolution, and was posted to Berlin and Vienna but the political situation caused the family to take up residence in Frankfurt. Moreover, Lee failed to obtain support from either Austria or Prussia. An unofficial U.S.-Dutch treaty that Lee helped draft became the cause of the Fourth Anglo-Dutch War. Towards the end of the war Lee moved to Brussels, and then, leaving his wife and children there rather than risk a wartime voyage, returned to Virginia alone to try to collect more than 10,000 English pounds of debts owed him by Virginia planters.

== Virginia planter and politician ==
During the war, his brother Richard Henry Lee had warned William Lee that slaves were fleeing to British lines, such that Lucy Paradise's Rich Neck plantation had but one remaining slave, and all Richard Taliaferro's slaves at Powhatan Plantation and Champion Travis' of Jamestown Island had escaped. Moreover, his wife's plantation on July 6, 1781, became the site of Battle of Green Spring, as General Lafayette's (outnumbered) forces fell into an ambush by Lord Cornwallis' troops during their retreat to nearby Yorktown, Virginia, where Cornwallis would ultimately surrender. In February 1782, Lee forwarded a complaint to Lafayette for damage done the estate.

Upon William Lee's return to Virginia, Elizabeth City, Warwick and York Counties elected him to the Virginia Senate in 1783 together with David Jameson, and confirmed Lee as their sole senator in the next session.

While at Green Spring with his son William Ludlow Lee, William Lee was concerned about the blacks, ordering that the most promising be apprenticed to various trades, as well as ordering repairs made upon the mansion that had grown decrepit under a succession of overseers.

Lee learned that his wife died suddenly in Ostend, Belgium on August 18, 1784, on her way home with the children, and ordered her buried in London with her parents. In 1785, his eyesight failing, he also tried to strengthen the Episcopal Church, while waiting for his daughters to arrive (they did in November, and would be sent to be educated at Menokin by the childless Col. Frank Lee and his wife Becky).

Although ill and going blind (cataract surgery in Philadelphia in 1789 having failed), Lee in 1790 accepted the post of James City County sheriff, and served two years.

== Death and legacy ==
William Lee died at Green Spring plantation on June 27, 1795, and was buried beside his Ludwell grandparents in Jamestown. The will he penned in 1789 left most of his estate (including about 8700 acres of land once held by Philip Ludwell III) to his son WIlliam Ludwell Lee, then 20 years old, who chose not to accept his father's advice to change his surname to Ludwell so that family name would not die out.

His underage sisters remained at Menokin, then after Col. Frank Lee's death moved to Alexandria, Virginia, where Portia married merchant William Hodgson in May 1799. William L. Lee often visited them, and Philadelphia, but also chose to pull down the old house against the advice of Benjamin Latrobe and replaced it with a new one. However, William L. Lee died on January 24, 1803. He was interred beside his father at Jamestown, with Bishop James Madison officiating at the service, which was postponed because of weather.

Both sisters then moved to Green Spring, wary of suitors attracted by their wealth. As executor, Hodgson tried to impose discipline on the plantation, including its slaves freed by William Lee's will on January 1 following his death, but finally sold the estate to George Mason in 1824. After interim owners, John and Robert C.A. Ward of New Jersey resumed using slave labor. Cornelia married Richmond businessman John Hopkins and bore four daughters before dying in Richmond of complications from the last birth in 1818.

Nonetheless, a free Black community remained at Centerville, in what he had called the Hot Water Tract. Although William L. Lee's will also made a bequest to establish a free school there, in 1818 the College of William and Mary brought suit, alleging that the annual allotments of corn had not been paid, nor did the college ever establish the school, although the case reportedly reached the Virginia Supreme Court of Appeals. By 1842 James City County voters were asked for permission to lend the funds out.

Green Spring would again become a battle site in the American Civil War, as part of the Battle of Williamsburg, and the replacement mansion burned down. In 1966, the National Park Service acquired about 200 acres of the property, which is now part of Colonial National Historic Park.

== Personal life ==
William married Hannah Phillipa Ludwell (1739–1784) on March 7, 1769, in London, following her father's death in that city. Hannah was also born into the First Families of Virginia as one of three daughters of Col. Philip Ludwell III (1716–1767) who operated Green Spring Plantation in Northumberland County, Virginia, and his wife, the former Frances Grymes (1717- ). Her sisters were Frances Ludwell and Lucy Ludwell Paradise. Their mother Frances was the older sister of Lucy Grymes (1734–1792), who married Maj. Gen. Henry Lee II (1730–1787). Her maternal grandparents were Hon. Charles Grymes (1693–1743) and Frances Jennings, and resided at "Morattico" in Richmond County. Her paternal grandparents were Philip Ludwell Jr. (1672–1726) and Hannah Harrison (1679–1731).

Before Hanna Ludwell Lee died in Ostend, Belgium on August 18, 1784, they had children:

1. William Ludwell Lee (1775–1803), who never married, and whose will administered by his brother in law William Hodgson freed his slaves.
2. Portia Lee (1777–1840), who married William Hodgson (1765–1820).
3. Brutus Lee (1778–1779), who died young.
4. Cornelia Lee (1780–1818), who married John Hopkins (c. 1778).
