= Flemish bond =

Type of brickwork

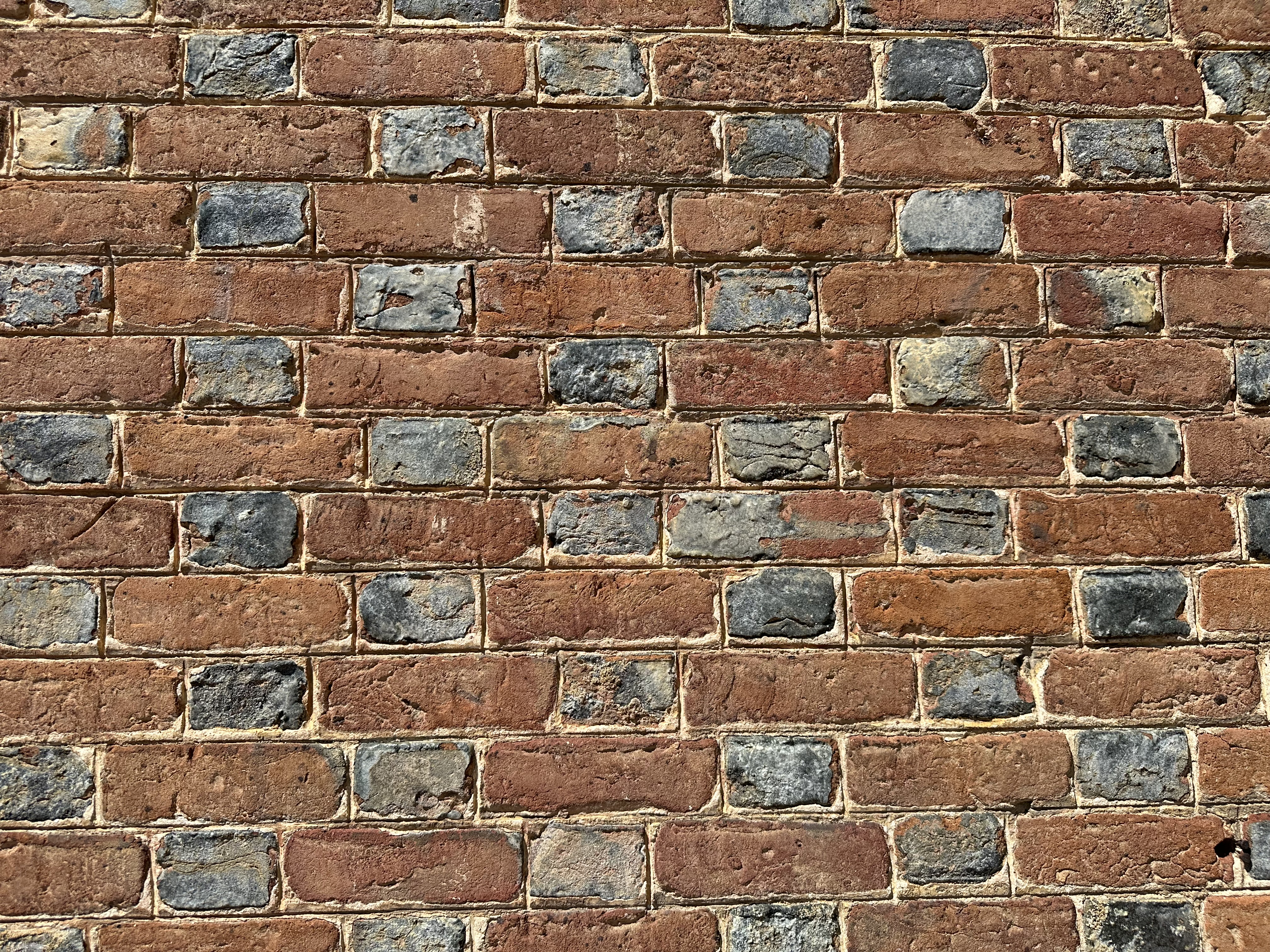
Flemish bond brickwork on the Ludwell–Paradise House in Williamsburg, Virginia

Flemish bond (Dutch: Vlaams verband) is a pattern of brickwork that is a common feature in Georgian architecture. The pattern features bricks laid lengthwise (stretchers) alternating with bricks laid with their shorter ends exposed (headers) within the same courses. This decorative pattern can be accented by glazing or burning the exposed ends of the headers so that they possess a dark, glassy surface that contrasts with the stretchers. Despite the bond's name, the pattern did not originate in Flanders and can be found in European architecture dating to the late Middle Ages.

The pattern became popular among prestigious architectural projects in 17th-century England before spreading to British colonies in North America where it became closely associated with colonial Georgian architecture, especially in Virginia and Pennsylvania. With the early 20th-century restoration project at Colonial Williamsburg, the pattern experienced renewed popularity in the United States.

== Name ==
Despite being called "Flemish bond", this pattern of brickwork is not native to Flanders nor neighboring regions. This type of bond became associated with the architecture of the Low Countries, eventually leading to the pattern's name.

== Description ==
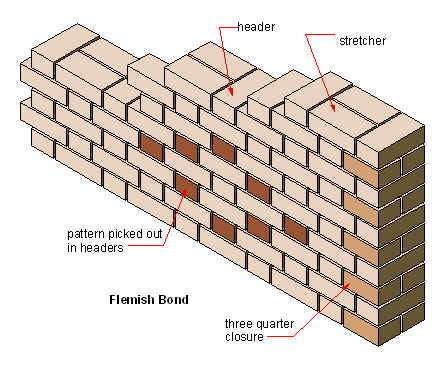
The bricks laid with the short end exposed are known as headers while those laid with the long end exposed are known as stretchers.

Flemish bond is a decorative form of brickwork pattern, as distinct from functional bonds such as English bond. Bricks known as stretchers are laid lengthwise and are alternated adjacent on the same horizontal plane (courses) with bricks known as headers that are laid with their shorter ends exposed. The decorative nature of the pattern can be accented by glazing or burning the headers. In the British North American colonies, this shiny black glazing was achieved when saplings were added during the kiln process.

== History ==
The pattern was employed throughout Northern and Central Europe during the late Middle Ages, with a notable number of Polish structures utilizing the bond. The late 15th-century Frauenkirche in Munich, Germany, is a prominent early example of the pattern's employment. Decorative brickwork had become highly developed in the Netherlands before its prominence in England during the 17th century and the later 19th-century Queen Anne Revival. Kew Palace (built 1631; also known as the Dutch House) in London is thought to be the first example of Flemish bond in England. The pattern became preferred for brickwork in high-quality English architecture by the middle of the 17th century.

St. Luke's Church (built c. 1632) in Smithfield, Virginia, is the oldest surviving building to use Flemish bond in what is now the United States. The bond achieved significant popularity in colonial Pennsylvania among its Georgian structures. Flemish bond was present in 17th-century colonial Virginia, though it would not be used for foundations, which were laid in English bond. By the 18th-century in Virginia, Flemish bond was being used in foundations and the bond's presence on a structure indicated wealth.

With the early 20th-century restoration project at Colonial Williamsburg that saw the restoration and reproduction of prominent historic buildings in Williamsburg, Virginia, such as the Ludwell–Paradise House that had used Flemish bond, the pattern experienced renewed popularity in the United States. Flemish bond is a regular component of both colonial and modern buildings on the campus of the College of William & Mary, also in Williamsburg.

== Examples ==
- Cattle Depot Artist Village, Hong Kong
- Frauenkirche, Munich
- Kew Palace, London
- Ludwell–Paradise House, Williamsburg, Virginia
- St. Luke's Church, Smithfield, Virginia
