= The Common Glory =

Outdoor drama by Paul Green

The Common Glory was an outdoor symphonic drama by Paul Green presented along Lake Matoaka on the campus of the College of William and Mary in Williamsburg, Virginia, from 1947 to 1976, except for two years. The drama covered a span from the Jamestown colony's early days to 1782, when the United States of America was established after the colonies gained independence from Great Britain.

== Beginning ==
The Jamestown Corporation commissioned Paul Green, a Pulitzer Prize-winning playwright, to create this play. Green had experience with historical dramas, having written The Lost Colony a decade earlier about the English colony on Roanoke Island.

On April 26, 1947, the corporation adopted The Common Glory as the title of the production and set July 17, 1947, as its premiere date. That title came from a phrase used by Thomas Jefferson, who is featured as a central figure in the play.

In his review that year, theater critic Brooks Atkinson described The Common Glory as "a Virginia enterprise, designed to remind Virginians of their share in the establishment of freedom in the New World ..."

== Characters ==
In addition to historical figures such as Jefferson, the play introduced fictional characters who were part of the play's development. Charles S. Watson, in his book The History of Southern Drama, commented that the drama "recognizes the indispensable contribution of common people to the American Revolution." For instance "Colonel Hugh Taylor", whose father came to Virginia as an indentured servant, suggests the phrase "pursuit of happiness" to Jefferson, and "Cephus", who had been a chicken thief, "reforms and takes up arms bravely".

Green wrote the play for a large cast, with many extras, so that local people could participate in the production. This was also a way to engage audiences - friends and families of those participating.

== Personnel ==
Althea Hunt directed the drama in its inaugural season. It was designed to engage numerous locals in the production: more than 125 participants were involved on stage in the drama. In addition, the production staff, technicians and other backstage workers increased the total number of people involved to more than 200. Among those to play leads during the show's run was Linda Lavin, who was a student at the College of William and Mary at the time.

== Music ==
Green wrote the music for The Common Glory, producing the works after weeks of research in collections of original hymns, ballads, marching songs, carols, and folk songs of English and Scottish origin. A 40-person choir performed vocal music. A specially designed organ, provided by an anonymous donor, produced instrumental music that ranged in effects from bagpipes to flutes to drums to trumpets.

== Settings ==
Action in the drama occurred in Jamestown, Williamsburg (including the House of Burgesses), the court of King George, and Philadelphia.

== Venue ==
The drama was presented in a 2,500-seat amphitheater with a 62-foot stage. The amphitheater is adjacent to Lake Matoaka, near Williamsburg. The facility, which was owned by the College of William and Mary and used under a long-term lease, was enhanced with $175,000 in improvements in preparation for the drama's debut.

It was produced from 1947 to 1976, except for the years 1964 and 1974.
