= Frances Culpeper Berkeley =

English emigrant to Virginia and wife of politicians

Frances Stephens Berkeley Ludwell
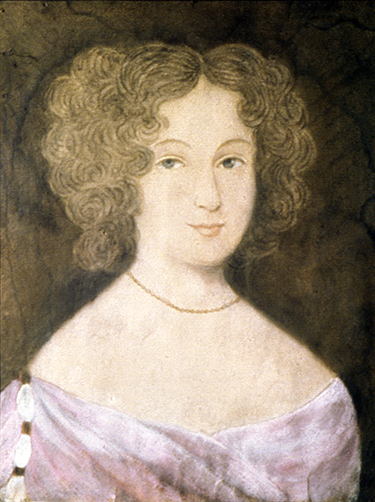
- Portrait of Frances Culpeper Stephens Berkeley Ludwell by an unknown artist, c. 1660
- Born: Frances Culpepper fl. 1634; Hollingbourne, Kent
- Died: c. 1691
- Spouses: Samuel Stephens (m. 1652; died 1670); Sir William Berkeley (m. 1670; died 1677); Philip Ludwell (m. 1680)

Frances Stephens Berkeley Ludwell (née Culpeper; baptised 27 May 1634 – 1690s), most commonly styled Lady Berkeley after her second marriage, was a leader of the Green Spring faction of Virginia politics in the seventeenth century and wife to three colonial governors.

== Biography ==
Frances Culpeper was born in Hollingbourne, Kent. Her father was Thomas Culpeper, and her mother was Katherine St Leger; her brother was the John Culpeper who later led Culpeper's Rebellion. The youngest of her parents' five children, she was born into a family with numerous interests in the colony of Virginia; her father had become a member of the Virginia Company of London in 1623, and in 1649 was made one of the original patent-holders of the Northern Neck.

The year in which Frances arrived to the New World is unknown, although she is said to have come with her parents around 1650. She was in the colonies by 1652, in which year she married Samuel Stephens of Warwick County, Virginia. The couple had no children. Her husband became "Commander of the Southern Plantation" in 1662, serving in that role for two years; in 1667 he became governor of Albemarle, holding that position until dying in 1670. At his death she inherited a plantation, called Balthrope or Boldrup, in Warwick County, a provision which had been agreed to before their marriage; unusually for a woman at the time she managed the estate herself instead of handing it over to a man. As there were no other heirs she received absolute possession of her husband's estate.

Within a few months of her husband's death Frances married again. Her new husband was Sir William Berkeley, governor of Virginia. Long admired, his popularity had waned by the time of his marriage, and he was ridiculed by many for taking a wife half his age. Even so, his union with Frances provided him with a closer alliance to a family with which he had long been aligned, and it increased her prestige appreciably, not least because she was now connected to most, if not all, the important families in the colony.

The couple lived at Green Spring Plantation, one of the finest houses in seventeenth-century Virginia. Described as "vigorous and energetic", she became a staunch defender of her husband, taking part in the events that led to Bacon's Rebellion, which was led by a distant relative of hers; she traveled to England and petitioned to the King on Berkeley's behalf. When commissioners were sent to investigate her husband's activities, she had the "common hangman mounted as an improvised postillion" to lead them away from the house. That she wielded considerable influence can be seen by the fact that she was able to obtain a pardon for one Jones, condemned by the governor for his participation in the rebellion, at the request of Sir Francis Moryson. Lady Berkeley's role in public life was widely known at the time, and some believed that the errors made by her husband in his last years could be laid at her feet instead.

Berkeley died in 1677, discredited by many former friends; in his will he referred to his "dear and most virtuous wife". Upon the death of her husband, Frances, by now the richest woman in Virginia if not in all of British North America, rallied a group of his supporters at Green Spring and encouraged them to maneuver against Herbert Jeffreys, the new governor, and English attempts to curb the colonists' freedoms; among them were Thomas Ballard, Robert Beverley, Edward Hill, and her future husband, Philip Ludwell, then secretary of the colony. This agitation continued until the arrival of Thomas Colepeper, the new governor and cousin to Frances, in 1680.

From this point she began to withdraw more and more from public life, but her interest in politics remained sharp. She persisted for some time in her attempts to collect the salary which Berkeley had been due at his death, enlisting the Virginia General Assembly in her efforts.

Frances married once more, in 1680, to Philip Ludwell of Rich Neck, a large plantation near Green Spring; he, too, would be named governor, "of that part of our Province of Carolina that lyes North and east of Cape feare", and so for a third time she became first lady, once again of North Carolina. She continued her interest in Virginia politics, occasionally petitioning the House of Burgesses on her husband's behalf. The couple spent much time in Virginia, and kept a pew at Bruton Parish Church. Lady Berkeley, as she continued to be known, had many friends among the local gentry, and William Byrd I and William Fitzhugh were among those who noted her influence and enlisted her aid in holding documents and information.

By 1691, when Ludwell took control of both Carolinas, Frances appears to have been deceased, although some sources state that she was alive as late as 1695. Her third husband returned to England without her in 1700; she was buried in Jamestown, Virginia, where her ruined tombstone may still be seen. Up to the time of her death she retained a reputation as a woman of intelligence and influence.

Lady Berkeley left no children, although she may have been pregnant at the time of her third marriage. William Byrd twice wrote remarks indicating that she was with child, but never was able to indicate a delivery date; at the time she was close to fifty. She served as stepmother to two children of her last husband.

Through her second husband's will, Frances Culpeper Berkeley became a Lord Proprietor of the province of Carolina; "by a curious combination of circumstances . . . had the good fortune to sell this interest twice, in 1682 and again in 1684, and each time to be paid for it." She was named one of the Library of Virginia's Virginia Women in History for 2008.
