= Decimus et Ultimus Barziza =

American politician (1838–1882)

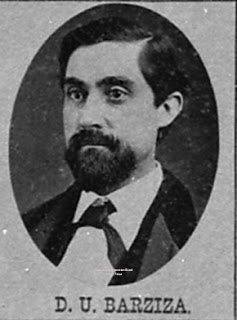
Decimus et Ultimus Barziza, in the 1870s

Decimus et Ultimus Barziza (also known as D.U. Barziza, Decimus Barziza, and Des Barziza) (September 4, 1838 in Williamsburg, Virginia – January 30, 1882 in Houston, Texas) was an American businessman, lawyer, and politician, who served two terms in the Texas Legislature.

== Early life ==
Barziza was born in Virginia in 1838. His father, Phillip Ignatius Barziza (originally Filippo Ignazio Barziza), was a viscount who had emigrated from Venice in 1820 and been forced to renounce his title of nobility and become an American citizen in order to legally qualify for a bequest; he subsequently married a French-Canadian woman, with whom he had ten children. The Barzizas named their tenth child "Decimus et Ultimus", Latin for "tenth and last".

Barziza attended the College of William & Mary in his hometown of Williamsburg from 1854-1857. He then moved to Texas and later in 1857 enrolled in the law school at Baylor University. He graduated in 1859 and established his law practice in Owensville.

In 1861 the American Civil War began and Barziza enlisted in the Confederate States Army, serving in the 4th Texas Infantry Regiment under Louis Wigfall and John Bell Hood. He was twice injured in combat, and fought in the Battle of Gettysburg, where he was captured at Little Round Top.

After spending a year in hospital as a prisoner of war, he escaped by leaping out the window of a moving prisoner-transport train in the middle of the night, and walking to Upper Canada, where Confederate sympathizers relayed him to Nova Scotia, and then Bermuda; there, a blockade runner returned him to North Carolina. From North Carolina, he was able to return to Texas, where he wrote his memoirs of captivity and of life as a fugitive, titled The Adventures of a Prisoner of War, and Life and Scenes in Federal Prisons: Johnson's Island, Fort Delaware, and Point Lookout, by an Escaped Prisoner of Hood's Texas Brigade.

== Political career ==
Barziza represented Harris County during the Fourteenth Texas Legislature (1874–1875) and the first session of the Fifteenth Texas Legislature (1876).

During the fourteenth legislature, he played a key role in the controversial transition of the Governorship from Edmund J. Davis to Richard Coke.

During the fifteenth legislature he ran for Speaker of the House but lost by two votes. At the end of the session, Barziza became embroiled in a procedural dispute regarding the Texas and Pacific Railway: in an effort to prevent a vote, he and 33 other representatives did not return from recess on July 31, 1876, so that there would not be a quorum. In response, the speaker ordered that the absentee representatives be arrested and forcibly brought back to the legislature. On August 2, 1876, Barziza resigned.

== Ancestry ==
Barziza was the great-grandson of scholar John Paradise.

== Legacy ==
Barziza Street, in the Houston neighborhood of Eastwood, is named for him.

In 1964, the University of Texas Press re-published his memoirs.

== See also ==
- Quintus et Ultimus Watson
