= Rich Neck Plantation =

Former plantation in the Colony of Virginia in what is now James City County, Virginia

Coordinates: 37°13′23″N 76°41′38″W

Rich Neck Plantation was located in James City County, Virginia in the Colony of Virginia.

== History ==
Rich Neck Plantation (not to be confused with Richneck Plantation in nearby Warwick County), was established around 1632 as part of the community of Middle Plantation. The latter was located on a ridge which ran along the center of the Virginia Peninsula separating the watersheds of the York River to the north and the James River to the south. A palisade to secure the area east down the Peninsula to Old Point Comfort ran across the land portion between Queen's Creek and College Creek, with the new community as its centerpiece.

Middle Plantation was renamed Williamsburg in 1699 after the College of William and Mary was established nearby and the capital of the colony was relocated there from Jamestown. In the early 1700s, a mill pond was constructed to power a gristmill which survives to present as Lake Matoaka.

Rich Neck Plantation was home to a number of noted Virginians, including three of seventeenth-century Virginia's big-name secretaries of the colony: Richard Kemp, Sir Thomas Lunsford, Thomas Ludwell, and brother Philip Ludwell, as well as dozens of slaves and servants. Later, Rich Neck became the home of Reverend Doctor James Blair, who in 1693 became the founder and first president of the College of William and Mary.

During the first half of the 20th century, although the house and dependencies had long since disappeared, local attorney Vernon Geddy and his wife Carrie (née Cole) Geddy built a home on a portion of the land west of College Creek. They named their home "Holly Hill" for numerous holly trees in near the house. Williamsburg's Holly Hills subdivision now occupies a portion of the former Rich Neck Plantation property west of College Creek. As of May 2010, Vernon and Carrie's grandson, Vernon Geddy III, and his wife, owned and occupied his grandparents' home, Holly Hill. He was also continuing a family tradition of the practice of law in the area.

Extensive archaeological work has been done on portions of the Rich Neck Plantation site by groups from the College of William and Mary, Colonial Williamsburg, and the Commonwealth of Virginia.
