= John Paradise =

Anglo-Greek linguist (1743–1795)

John Paradise (1743–1795) was an Anglo-Greek linguist, known as a friend of Samuel Johnson and Fellow of the Royal Society.

== Life ==
He was born at Salonica in April 1743, the son of Peter Paradise (died 1 February 1779), who was the resident English consul to the ruling Ottoman government, descended from a half-Greek, half-English mother. Paradise was a native-born member of the Greek Orthodox Church. He was educated at Padua, and later relocated to London where he lived for most of his life. He was fluent in Ancient and Modern Greek, Latin, Turkish, French, Italian, and English. Paradise's American contacts,Benjamin Franklin and Thomas Jefferson, encouraged him to relocate to the newly independent United States of America.

Throughout their correspondence in the 1780s, Paradise assisted Jefferson in studying the Greek language.

On April 14, 1769, Paradise was created M.A. of Oxford University, and on July 3, 1776, the degree of D.C.L. was conferred on him. He was elected Fellow of the Royal Society on 2 May 1771. His house was open to men of letters, and he entertained leading literary figures. Samuel Johnson dined with him, and on one occasion met Joseph Priestley there at dinner. When Johnson started an evening club at the Essex Head Tavern in Essex Street, London, in December 1783, Paradise was one of the regular attendants. Sir Joshua Reynolds, when discussing the club, enumerated him among the "very learned". He was one of the mourners at Johnson's funeral.

Paradise, a friend of Sir William Jones, was described as very silent, modest, and amiable. He lived at one time in Charles Street, Cavendish Square; he died at Great Titchfield Street, London, on 12 December 1795. He left money to buy mourning rings to nine: Isaac Hawkins Browne, Nathaniel Burwell, Bennet Langton, Samuel Horsley, Thomas Jefferson, Richard Warburton Lytton, Frederick North, William Windham, and Semyon Romanovich Woronzow.

== Family ==
On 18 May 1769, he married Lucy Ludwell (1751–1814), daughter of Philip Ludwell III, a plantation owner from Virginia. Lucy, like John, was a member of the Greek Orthodox Church. Around 1805, after the death of her husband and two daughters she returned to Williamsburg, where she lived in the Ludwell–Paradise House.
