= Philip Ludwell =

Colonial official, planter and soldier

Colonel Philip Ludwell
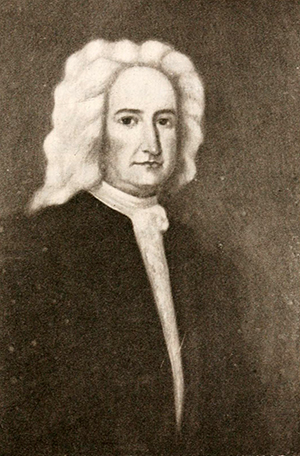
- Portrait likely of Ludwell

Governor Carolina
- In office 5 December 1689 – May 1693
- Monarch: William III
- Preceded by: Henry Duke
- Succeeded by: Thomas Smith

24th Speaker of the Virginia House of Burgesses
- In office 1695–1696
- Preceded by: Thomas Milner
- Succeeded by: Robert Carter

Member of the Virginia House of Burgesses representing James City County
- In office 1698–1696
- Preceded by: Michael Sherman
- Succeeded by: Thomas Cowles, Henry Duke
- In office 1695–1696 Serving with Poynes Weldon
- Succeeded by: Henry Duke

Virginia Council of State
- In office 1675-1679, 1680-1687

Personal details
- Born: c.1638 Bruton, Somerset, England
- Died: c.1723 Bruton, Somerset County, England
- Spouse: Lucy Higginson (m. 1668; died 1675) Frances Culpeper Berkeley (m. 1680)
- Children: Philip Ludwell Jr. Lucy Ludwell
- Occupation: planter, soldier, bureaucrat
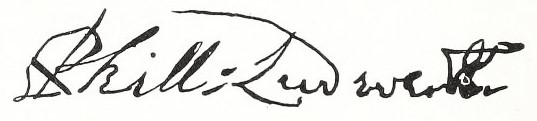
- Signature

Military service
- Branch/service: Virginia militia
- Rank: Colonel
- Battles/wars: Bacon's Rebellion

Philip Cottington Ludwell (c. 1638 – c. 1723) was an English-born planter and politician in colonial Virginia who sat on the Virginia Governor's Council, the first of three generations of men with the same name to do so, and briefly served as speaker of the House of Burgesses. In addition to operating plantations in Virginia using enslaved labor, Ludwell also served as a governor of the Province of Carolina.

== Early life and family ==
Philip Ludwell was born in Bruton, Somerset, England. He emigrated to Virginia circa 1661, where his brother Thomas Ludwell was secretary of the colony, and fellow Bruton native William Berkeley served several terms as governor, first under the London Company, and then pursuant to royal commission after Virginia became a royal colony.

He married Lucy Higginson Burwell, the daughter of Captain Robert Higginson and widow of Major Lewis Burwell I and later of William Bernard. They had a son Philip Ludwell Jr. and a daughter Lucy who married future burgess Daniel Parke II, and whose daughter (also named Lucy) would marry William Byrd II.

== Career ==
In 1667, Philip Ludwell became captain of the James City County militia. After marrying his first wife and becoming the guardian for her son Lewis Burwell who had not reached legal age, he operated Fairfield, the Burwell family's plantation on Carter's Creek in Gloucester County, probably until about 1675 (both her death and when her son Lewis Burwell reached legal age and married for the first time).

Ludwell patented large areas of land, and probably lived for a time with his brother Thomas at Rich Neck Plantation in James City County near Jamestown.

In November 1674, Thomas Ludwell sailed to England, having authorized his brother to serve as the Virginia Colony's Deputy Secretary. In the mid-1670s, Philip Ludwell also appeared before Virginia's General Court to file audited accounts as well as filed lawsuits and present testimony, and also served as the colony's surveyor general. In 1675, he was named to the Council of State (both the upper house of the Virginia General Assembly and the advisory council to the governor) and would hold that position until 1677.

In 1676, both Ludwell brothers remained among the strongest supporters of Virginia governor William Berkeley during Bacon's Rebellion, named after the leader, a nephew of Lady Berkeley, and whom she would denounce as a scheming and ungrateful malcontent. Col. Philip Ludwell led an unsuccessful raid upon Bacon's compound, before Bacon died of disease at what became known as Bacon's Castle. Col. Ludwell also accompanied Governor Berkeley during his temporary exile to the Eastern Shore, during which time the rebels burned the colonial capital at Jamestown, as well as plundered Berkeley's Green Spring Plantation, Ludwell's plantation and goods, and those of his Burwell stepson and ward.

Both Ludwell brothers remained prominent residents of what some called Middle Plantation until 1677—both when Governor Berkeley died in London and Thomas Ludlow died later in the year in Virginia. Ultimately, the colony's capital was reestablished very near Middle Plantation at Williamsburg, since stagnant water at Jamestown during summer months proved especially unhealthful.

Philip Ludwell had witnessed Governor Berkeley's will in March 1677, and three years later he became the third husband of Berkeley's widow, Frances Culpeper Berkeley of Green Spring Plantation. In the interim, Lady Berkeley had sailed to England after the rebellion, hoping to save her husband's reputation, but was unsuccessful and ended up sailing back to Virginia with his successor, Herbert Jeffreys. After quashing the rebellion, Lord Berkeley had been recalled and died in England in 1677. In 1680, the year of his second marriage, Philip Ludwell again became a member of the Governor's Council of State. Lady Berkeley, though now the colony's wealthiest person in Virginia (and with lands in North Carolina as well inherited from her first husband) and who remained so politically active that a faction was named after her main Green Spring plantation, continued to run her plantations using large numbers of slaves.

Not only was Lady Berkeley known as opinionated, Ludwell's continued outspoken views also put him at odds with Lt. Governor Herbert Jeffreys until Jeffrey's death and Ludwell's re-instatement to the Governor's Council upon petition of other burgesses. The conflict recurred later with Governor Francis Howard, so that Ludwell was again suspended from the Governor's Council in 1688 but sailed to England with a petition for relief signed by several burgesses. Thus, although James City County voters elected both Ludwell and James Bray Sr. to represent them in the House of Burgesses that year, Ludwell was not allowed to be seated (his son-in-law Daniel Parke won the new election and was seated). Ludwell would again carry a petition of Burgesses and Lady Berkeley to England circa 1791, and received a vote of thanks and 250 pounds sterling for his efforts.

Despite her remarriage and moving for a time to the Ludwell plantation at Rich Neck, Lady Berkeley never relinquished her title as Lady Berkeley before her death (probably at Green Spring and probably in 1695, though she would be reburied at Jamestown). Since she had no surviving children from her prior marriages, nor the last, Ludlow inherited her property, including Green Spring, that she had inherited from Gov. Berkeley and from her first husband, North Carolina Gov. Samuel Stephens, and would in turn pass them onto his son by his first marriage, Philip Ludwell Jr.

In 1684 and 1685, after Governor Howard arrived in Virginia, Ludwell was hired to build and remodel the statehouse and secretary's office in Jamestown. Around 1691, Ludwell became Lord Fairfax's agent for the Northern Neck Proprietary. He also bought lots in Jamestown.

Through Lady Berkeley's efforts, the Lords Proprietor in London appointed Ludwell as governor of the Province of Carolina on both 5 December 1689 and again in November 1691. By this time, North Carolina residents had rebelled against the chaotic rule of Seth Sothel, who was sent into exile in 1689. Lady Berkeley's first husband Samuel Stephens had held a similar position as the 2nd governor of the Albemarle Sound colony, William Berkeley had been one of the Lords Proprietor until his death, and she had inherited land there, some of which Ludwell sold to other proprietors in 1689. Ludwell managed to established a government for the northern part of the colony in Albemarle Sound in May 1690, despite Virginia emigrant John Gibbs' refusal to concede power. Gibbs had filled the power vacuum after Sothel's departure and argued that the colony's Fundamental Constitutions required a resident governor, which Ludwell would not be based on his marital and business interests. Both Gibbs and Ludwell sailed to London by year's end, where the Lords Proprietor disallowed Gibbs' claim. The Lords Proprietor then explicitly revoked the Fundamental Constitution and in November 1691 issued another commission to Ludwell with explicit power to appoint a deputy governor for northern Carolina, and expecting that he would make Charles Town the government seat. Ludwell soon appointed Thomas Jarvis as his deputy in North Carolina. He arrived in Charles Town in April 1692, published his new commission and established a government, although he found affairs there chaotic and after leaving affairs in the hands of Thomas Smith and promising to return in four months, returned to North Carolina (where Jarvis had fallen ill) and Virginia by May 1693.

Ludwell then returned to Virginia politics, won election as one of James City County's two delegates (alongside Poynes Weldon), and fellow Burgesses elected him as speaker in the 1695-1696 session before Ludwell again sailed to England.

== Later life and death ==
Coat of Arms of Philip Ludwell

Although the date remains unclear, Philip Ludlow returned to England permanently after his wife's death, after entrusting his Virginia plantations and other property to his son.

Now an elder gentleman, Ludlow died in England, possibly in his native Bruton in Somerset, as late as 1723 according to a letter sent to Philip Ludwell Jr. by an English relative. He is buried at the family vault in the Stratford-atte-Bow church in Middlesex (now east London).
