= Green Spring Plantation =

17th century plantation of the governor of Colonial Virginia in North America

- Green Spring
- U.S. National Register of Historic Places
- Virginia Landmarks Register
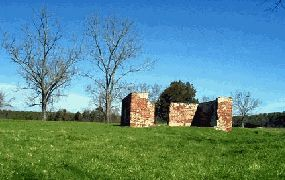
- Remains of ancillary jail structure at Green Spring Plantation site

- Location within Virginia Location within the United States
- Nearest city: Williamsburg, Virginia
- Coordinates: 37°15′27″N 76°48′11″W
- Area: 190 acres (77 ha)
- Built: 1645; 381 years ago
- Part of: Colonial National Historical Park (ID66000839)
- NRHP reference No.: 78000261
- VLR No.: 047-0006

Significant dates
- Added to NRHP: December 29, 1978
- Designated VLR: March 19, 1997

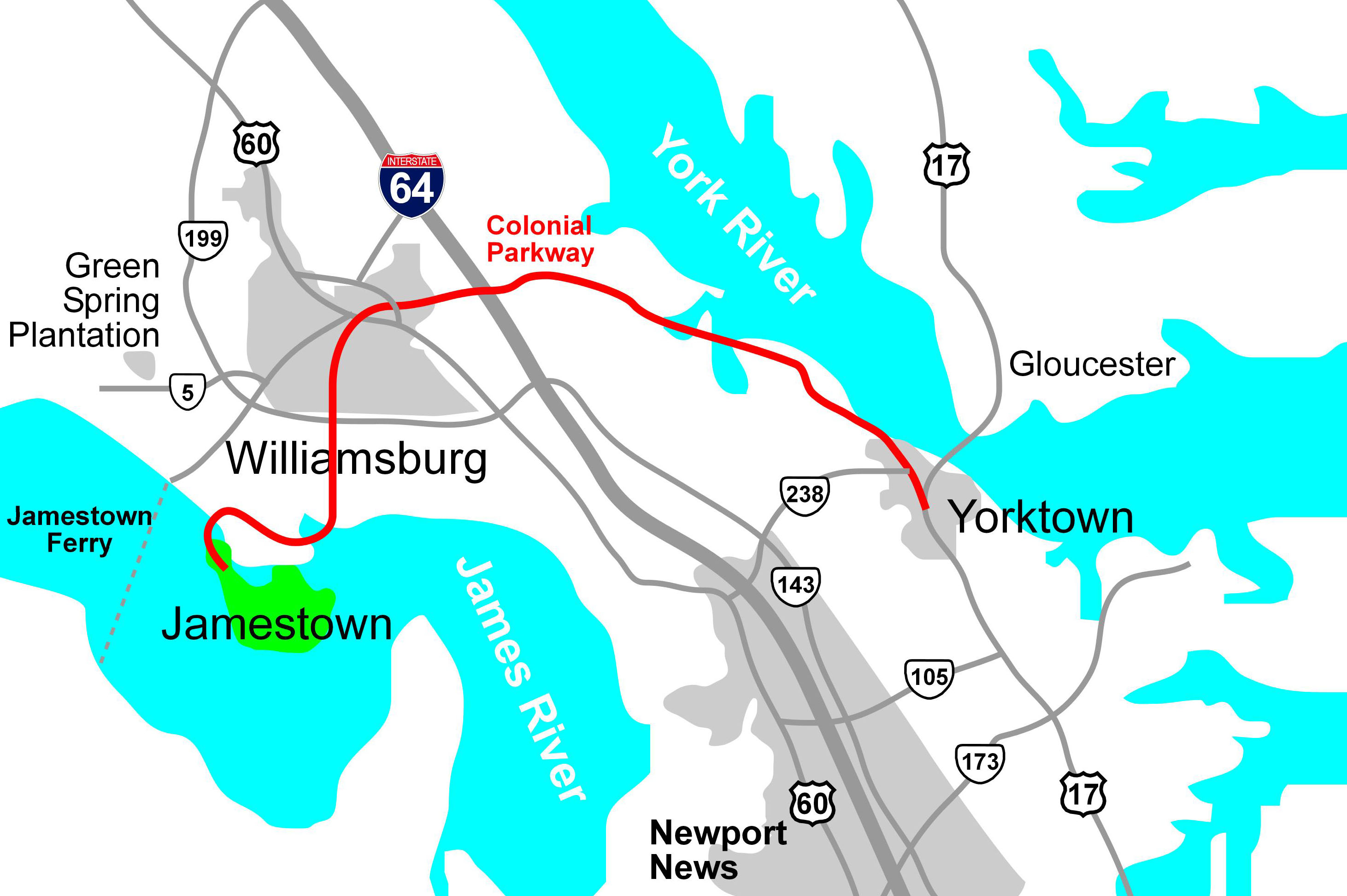
Green Spring site is at western edge of Colonial Virginia's Historic Triangle near Jamestown and Williamsburg

Green Spring Plantation in James City County about five miles (8.0 km) west of Williamsburg, was the 17th century plantation of one of the most unpopular governors of Colonial Virginia in North America, Sir William Berkeley, and his wife, Frances Culpeper Berkeley.

Sir William Berkeley, who served several terms, is perhaps the best-known of Virginia's colonial governors. Contrary to popular belief the well-known Berkeley Plantation in nearby Charles City County was not named in his honor.

Today, a section of the land that formed the core of Green Spring Plantation is part of the Colonial National Historical Park. It also lends its name to the section of the multi-use Virginia Capital Trail that extends from Governor Berkeley's capital at Jamestown, past many former great plantations (including Berkeley plantation) to the current state capital at Richmond, Virginia.

== History ==
The name Green Spring Plantation originated from the natural spring on the site, which continues over 350 years later to produce huge quantities of very beautifully clear, ultra cold water. The Green Spring produced a flow "so very cold that 'twas dangerous drinking the water thereof in Summer-time," wrote a visitor in the 1680s."

The plantation house at Green Spring was built in 1645. The plantation originally encompassed a 2,090-acre (850 ha) experimental farm.

Seeking alternative export products to supplement tobacco, which had become the Colony's mainstay, Green Spring produced flax, fruits, potash, rice, silk, and spirits, which were shipped to markets in North America, the West Indies, Great Britain, and Holland.

The plantation was owned by Governor William Berkeley until his death in 1677. When Berkeley's widow Lady Frances married Philip Ludwell, ownership passed to him, and then to his son Philip Ludwell II and grandson Philip Ludwell III.

On March 13, 1683, the Council determined that Greenspring windmill was to be the site of the building of the King's storehouse.

Green Spring Plantation witnessed many historic events, including the beginnings of slavery in Virginia, Bacon's Rebellion in 1676, the Battle of Green Spring during the American Revolutionary War in 1781, and the emancipation of its slaves in 1804, by the will of William Ludwell Lee, son of William Lee. In 1862, the property was also involved in the Battle of Williamsburg during the Peninsula Campaign of the American Civil War. A second mansion on the site was burned during the Civil War.

== Preservation ==
In the 21st century, about 200 acres (81 ha) of the original plantation are preserved by the National Park Service (NPS) as part of the Colonial National Historical Park, which acquired the property in 1966. The site includes archaeological and architectural remnants of the manor house and ancillary structures. It was listed on the National Register of Historic Places on December 29, 1978. It has been argued by historian Virginia B. Price that numerous Virginia county courthouses, including Hanover, King William, and Nelson, are, “arguably, the Green Spring house’s architectural legacy.”

== See also ==
- Colonial National Historical Park
- Colonial Williamsburg
- Jamestown, Virginia
