= National Register of Historic Places listings in Surry County, Virginia =

Location of Surry County in Virginia

This is a list of the National Register of Historic Places listings in Surry County, Virginia.

This is intended to be a complete list of the properties and districts on the National Register of Historic Places in Surry County, Virginia, United States. The locations of National Register properties and districts for which the latitude and longitude coordinates are included below, may be seen in an online map.

There are 20 properties and districts listed on the National Register in the county, including 1 National Historic Landmark.

This National Park Service list is complete through NPS recent listings posted March 21, 2025.

== Current listings ==
	Name on the Register	Image	Date listed	Location	City or town	Description
1	Bacon's Castle	Bacon's Castle	October 15, 1966 (#66000849)	Bacons Castle Trail; 37°06′33″N 76°43′20″W	Bacon's Castle	
2	Cedar Ridge	Cedar Ridge	August 2, 2000 (#00000894)	4861 Laurel Dr. 37°06′38″N 77°07′27″W	Disputanta	
3	Chippokes Plantation	Chippokes Plantation	October 1, 1969 (#69000283)	Chippokes Farm Rd. in Chippokes State Park; 37°08′19″N 76°43′15″W	Jamestown	
4	Enos House	Enos House	December 7, 1977 (#77001494)	Enos Farm Dr. 37°07′41″N 76°50′56″W	Surry	
5	Four Mile Tree	Four Mile Tree	December 18, 1970 (#70000826)	Northeast of the junction of Southwark and Swanns Point Rds. 37°12′21″N 76°51′11″W	Surry	
6	Glebe House of Southwark Parish	Glebe House of Southwark Parish	May 17, 1976 (#76002123)	East of Spring Grove on State Route 10; 37°08′26″N 76°54′19″W	Spring Grove	
7	Melville	Melville	May 6, 1980 (#80004228)	Melville Dr. 37°08′33″N 76°47′21″W	Surry	
8	Montpelier	Montpelier	March 26, 1980 (#80004227)	1.4 miles (2.3 km) southwest of Cabin Point; 37°10′20″N 77°03′08″W	Cabin Point	
9	Old Brick Church	Old Brick Church	January 2, 1986 (#86000002)	State Route 10; 37°06′31″N 76°44′08″W	Bacon's Castle	
10	Pleasant Point	Pleasant Point	July 16, 1976 (#76002122)	1 mile south of Scotland on Pleasant Point Rd. 37°10′26″N 76°46′32″W	Scotland	
11	Rich Neck Farm	Rich Neck Farm	May 19, 1980 (#80004229)	East of Surry on Chippokes Farm Rd. 37°07′33″N 76°45′05″W	Surry	
12	Rogers' Store	Rogers' Store	May 30, 2002 (#02000595)	Junction of Carsley and Otterdam Rds. 37°05′44″N 77°00′20″W	Surry	
13	Second Southwark Church Archeological Site (44SY65)	Second Southwark Church Archeological Site (44SY65)	February 23, 1984 (#84003610)	Southwark Rd. 37°11′08″N 76°51′23″W	Surry	Site occupied by a 1927 monument
14	Smith's Fort	Smith's Fort	June 15, 1970 (#70000827)	Smith Fort Ln. 37°09′50″N 76°49′12″W	Surry	
15	Snow Hill	Snow Hill	December 28, 1979 (#79003091)	State Route 40; 37°05′20″N 77°02′56″W	Gwaltney Corner	
16	Surry County Courthouse Complex	Surry County Courthouse Complex	April 10, 1986 (#86000719)	State Route 10; 37°08′15″N 76°50′05″W	Surry	
17	Swann's Point Plantation Site	Swann's Point Plantation Site	April 1, 1975 (#75002040)	North of Swanns Point Rd. 37°12′00″N 76°49′06″W	Scotland	
18	Town of Surry Historic District	Town of Surry Historic District	November 24, 2017 (#100001855)	Generally along E. Colonial Trail, the Rolfe Highway, Lebanon and Beechland Rds., and Bank, School, and Church Sts. 37°08′17″N 76°50′03″W	Surry	
19	Walnut Valley	Walnut Valley	August 27, 2013 (#13000649)	Southeastern corner of Highgate and Chippokes Farm Rds. 37°07′14″N 76°44′33″W	Highgate	Includes an archaeological site surrounding a rare surviving slave house
20	Warren House	Warren House	November 14, 1973 (#73002065)	Northeast of Surry on Smith Fort Ln. 37°09′51″N 76°49′12″W	Surry	

== See also ==
- List of National Historic Landmarks in Virginia
- National Register of Historic Places listings in Virginia
