= Second Southwark Church Archeological Site =

Archaeological site in Virginia, United States

- Second Southwark Church Archeological Site (44SY65)
- U.S. National Register of Historic Places
- Virginia Landmarks Register
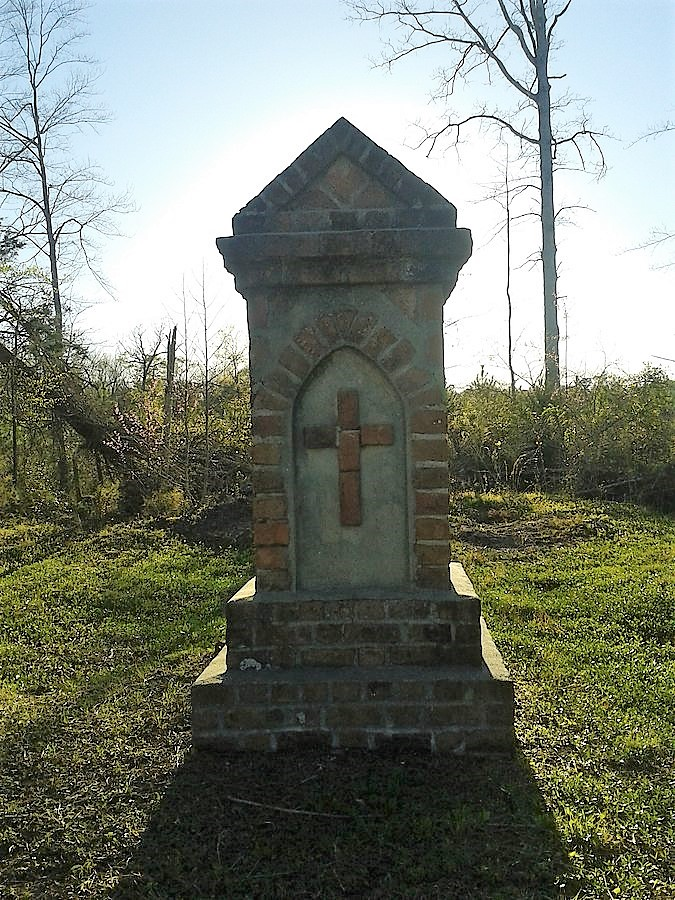
- Memorial on the site of the church, dusk, April 2017

- Location within Virginia Location within the United States
- Nearest city: Surry, Virginia
- Coordinates: 37.13345°N 76.886°W
- Area: 1 acre (0.40 ha)
- Built: 1686
- NRHP reference No.: 84003610
- VLR No.: 090-0069

Significant dates
- Added to NRHP: February 23, 1984
- Designated VLR: January 17, 1984

Second Southwark Church Archeological Site is a historic archaeological site located near Surry, Surry County, Virginia. The site includes the remains of the second church to serve Southwark Parish. It is believed to have been erected by 1673, and replaced an earlier church built about 1655. The church was abandoned shortly after the American Revolutionary War, and stood in ruins through the American Civil War. A monument was erected on the site in 1927. A Virginia highway marker commemorating the church site is located near the junction of Virginia Routes 10 and 618.

It was listed on the National Register of Historic Places in 1984.
