= Elberon, Virginia =

- Unincorporated community
- Location within Virginia Location within the United States
- Coordinates: 37°04′28″N 76°53′01″W
- Country: United States
- State: Virginia
- County: Surry
- Elevation: 112 ft (34 m)
- Time zone: UTC-5 (Eastern (EST))
  - Summer (DST): UTC-4 (EDT)
- ZIP code: 23846
- Area codes: 757, 948
- GNIS feature ID: 1477294

Elberon is an unincorporated community in Surry County, Virginia, United States. Elberon is located on Virginia State Highway 31, 5.1 miles (8.2 km) south-southwest of Surry. Elberon had a post office, which opened on December 24, 1902, and closed on January 23, 2010; it still has its own ZIP code, 23846.
