= Old Brick Church (Bacon's Castle, Virginia) =

Historic church in Virginia, United States

- U.S. National Register of Historic Places
- Virginia Landmarks Register
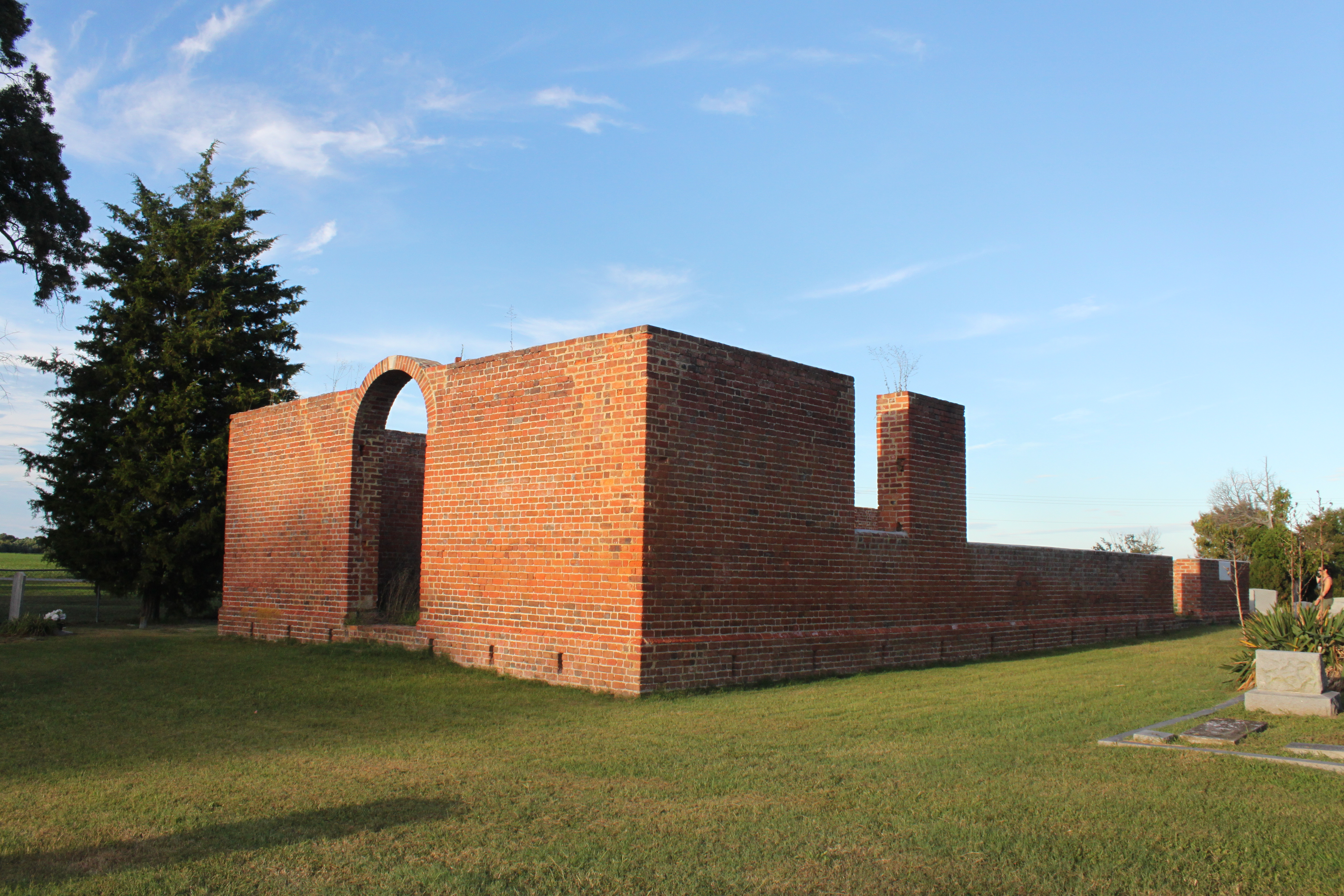

- Location within Virginia Location within the United States
- Location: VA 10, near Bacon's Castle, Virginia
- Coordinates: 37°6′30″N 76°44′9″W
- Area: 1.9 acres (0.77 ha)
- Built: 1754
- Architectural style: Colonial, Rectilinear, Anglican Church
- NRHP reference No.: 86000002
- VLR No.: 090-0034

Significant dates
- Added to NRHP: January 2, 1986
- Designated VLR: September 16, 1982

Old Brick Church (Lower Church, Southwark Parish) variously known as the Lawnes Creek Parish Church or the Lower Surry Church is a historic church in Bacon's Castle, Virginia.

The lower chapel of the Southwark Parish was a brick rectangular room church built in 1754 about a mile northwest of Bacon's Castle, in Surry County, Virginia. Its brick walls are irregularly laid in Flemish bond and English bond with a few glazed headers. The church remained abandoned from the Disestablishment of the Church of England in America until 1847. It was destroyed by a fire, reputedly set by recently freed slaves following the American Civil War in 1868, but its thick brick walls remained standing. Its ruins were added to the National Register of Historic Places in 1986.

The Old Brick Church was typical of the Virginia vernacular churches of the colonial period. Prior to its destruction it probably resembled other surviving 18th century brick rectangular room churches in Virginia such as the circa-1743 Merchant's Hope Church in Prince George County and the Ware Parish Church in Gloucester. Its walls were fairly well preserved until 2003, when a large oak tree in the churchyard was uprooted by high winds during Hurricane Isabel and fell on the ruins of the church, collapsing large portions of its walls. The ruins have since been stabilized, and many of the original bricks were saved. There are plans to reconstruct the walls and restore the church to its colonial appearance.

According to local folklore going back more than a century, the ruins of the Old Brick Church are said to be haunted. Many credible people young and old over several generations claim to have seen the flying fireball. Those who have seen it describe it as simply a ball of fire. It rises from the church cemetery into the air about forty feet and slowly drifts across the broad fields towards Bacon's Castle. A former owner of the plantation saw the fireball out of his window and rushed outside thinking his barn was ablaze. Another person staying at the 17th-century Jacobean mansion woke up to find the ball circling his bed before flying back out the window. Many years ago a church meeting was being held outside in the graveyard and everyone in attendance claimed to have seen the ball of fire.

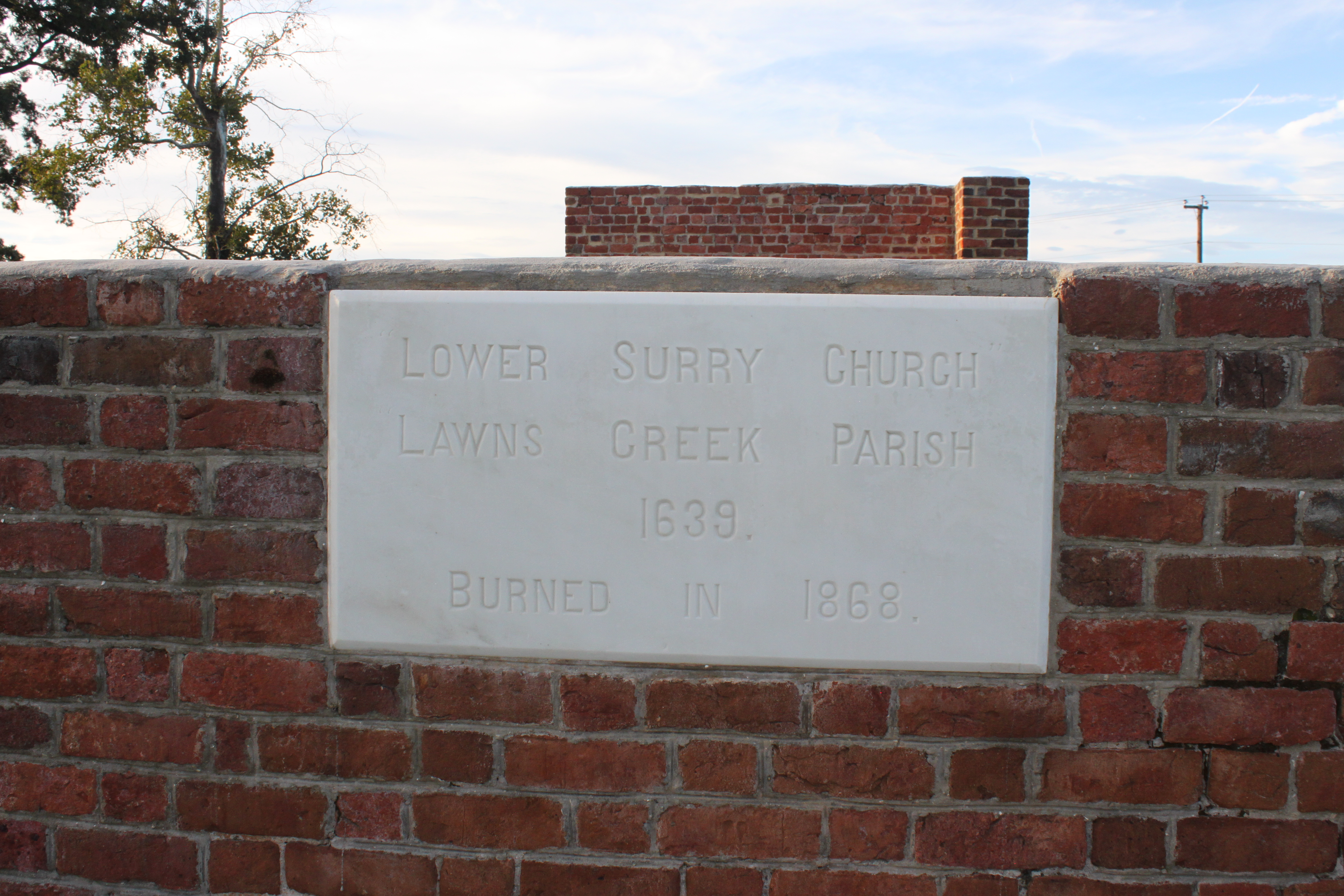
Old Brick Church, VA 10 Bacon

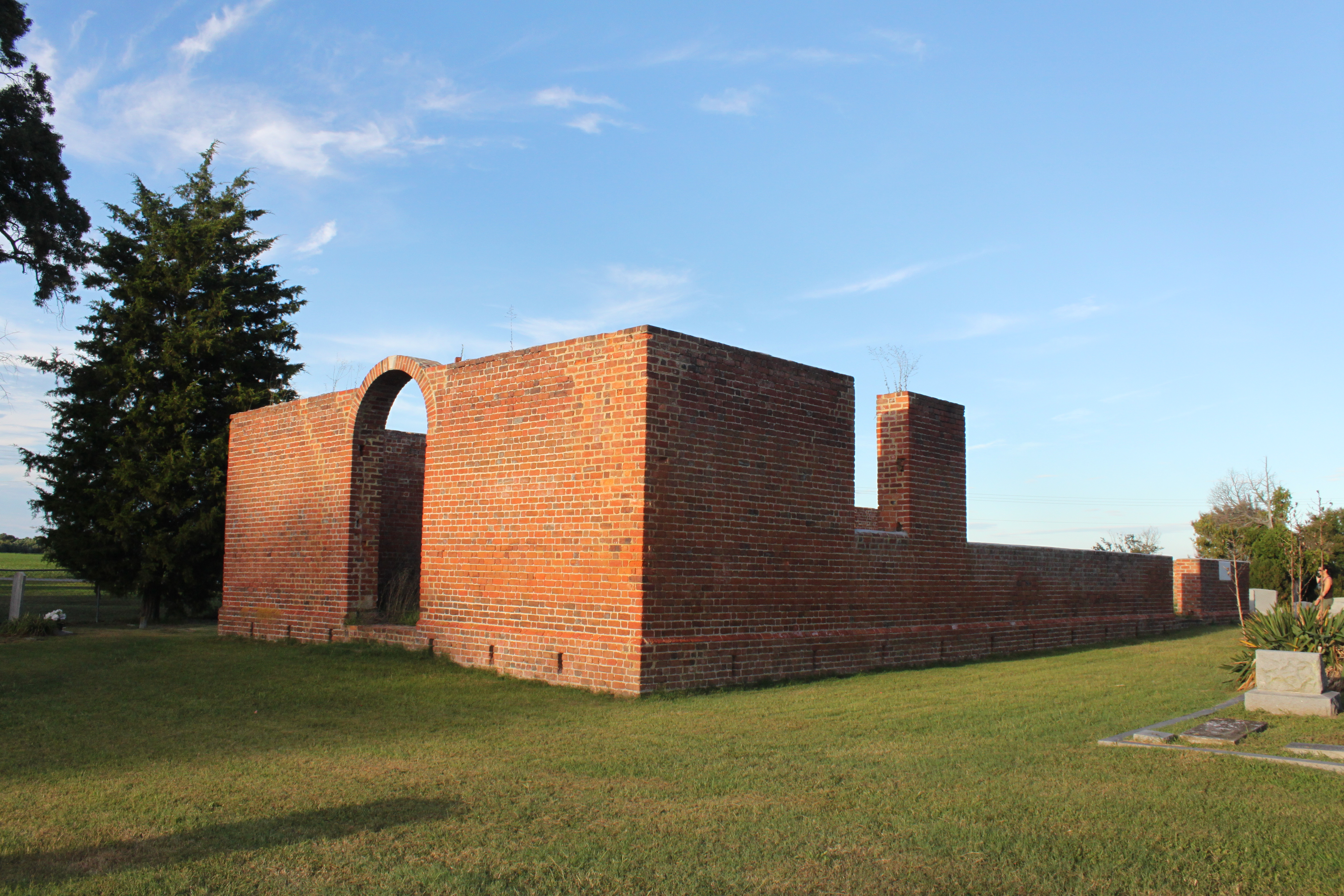
Old Brick Church, VA 10 Bacon

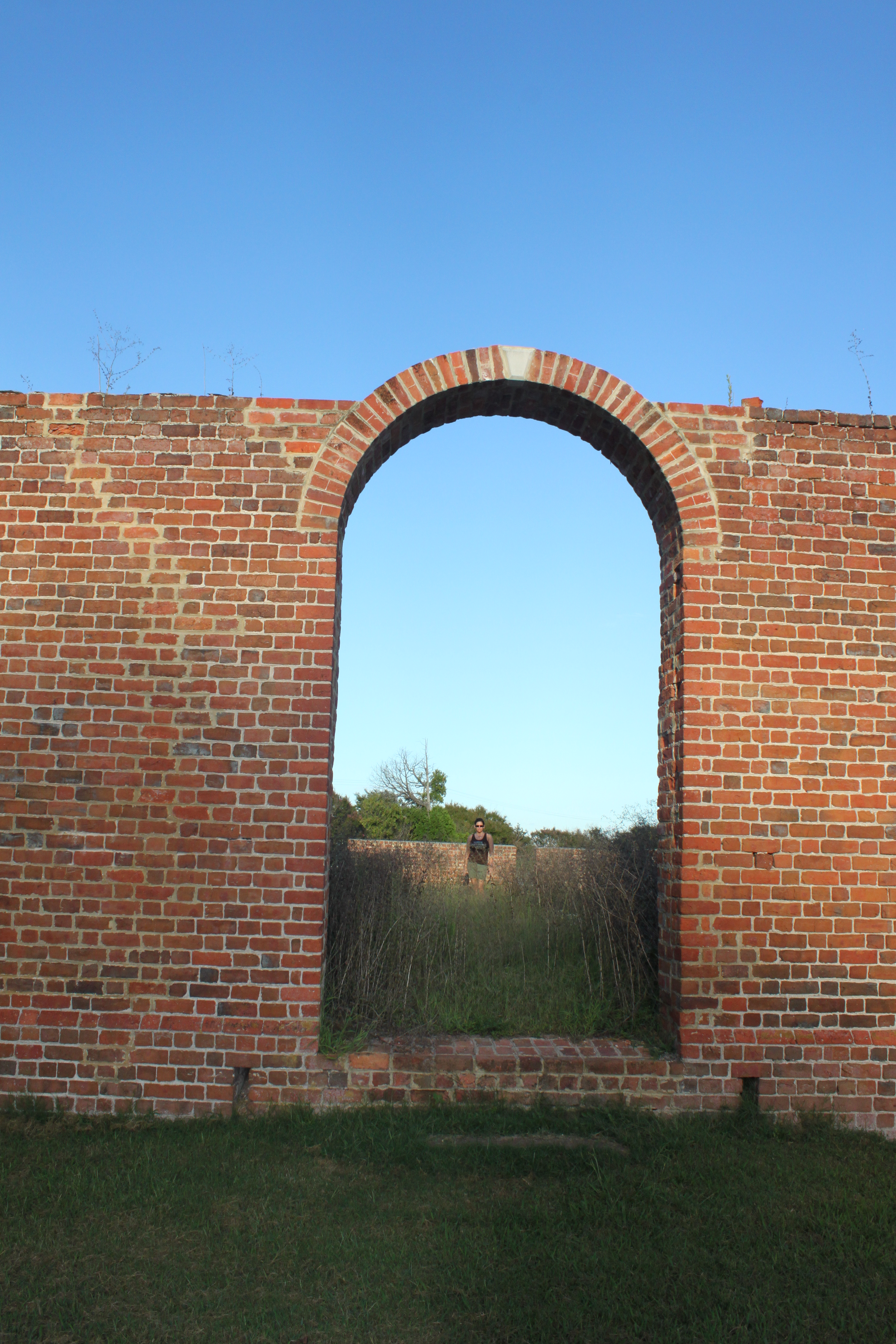
Old Brick Church, VA 10 Bacon
