= Enos House =

Historic house in Virginia, United States

- U.S. National Register of Historic Places
- Virginia Landmarks Register
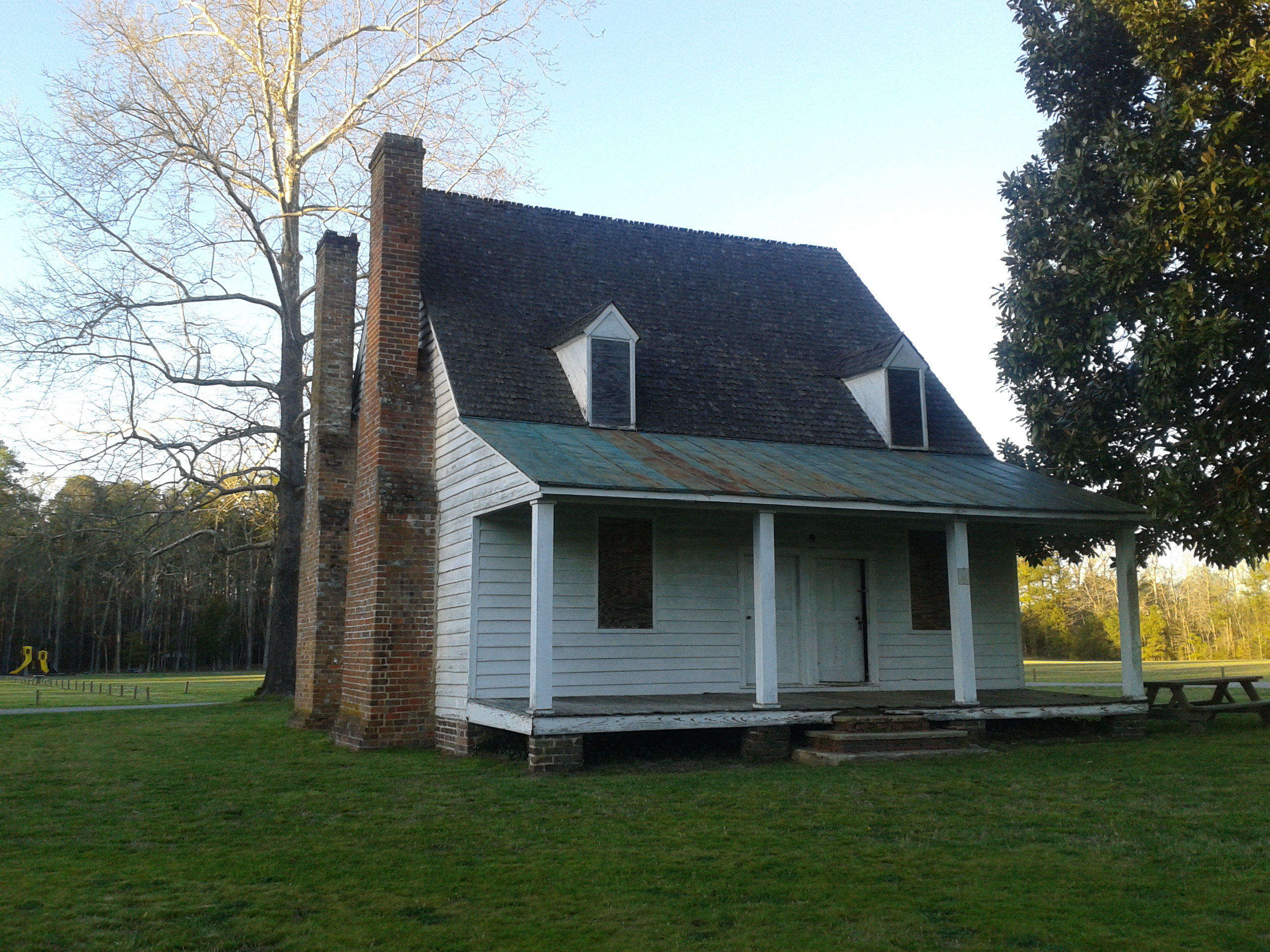
- Front of the house, April 2017

- Location within Virginia Location within the United States
- Nearest city: Surry, Virginia
- Coordinates: 37.125509°N 76.848961°W
- Area: 10 acres (4.0 ha)
- Built: c. 1810
- Architectural style: Double-pile, hall-and-parlor
- NRHP reference No.: 77001494
- VLR No.: 090-0039

Significant dates
- Added to NRHP: December 7, 1977
- Designated VLR: May 17, 1977

Enos House, also known as Warren House, is a historic home located on Enos Farm Drive near Surry, Surry County, Virginia. It was built c. 1810, and is a 1 1/2-story, double-pile hall-parlor plan frame dwelling. It has a gable roof and features a low full-length shed porch on the front facade. It has a 20th-century rear ell.

It was listed on the National Register of Historic Places in 1977. The farm is now owned by Surry County, which has developed it for recreational purposes. The property, but not the house, is open to the public.
