= Smith's Fort Plantation =

Historic house in Virginia, United States

- Warren House
- U.S. National Register of Historic Places
- Virginia Landmarks Register
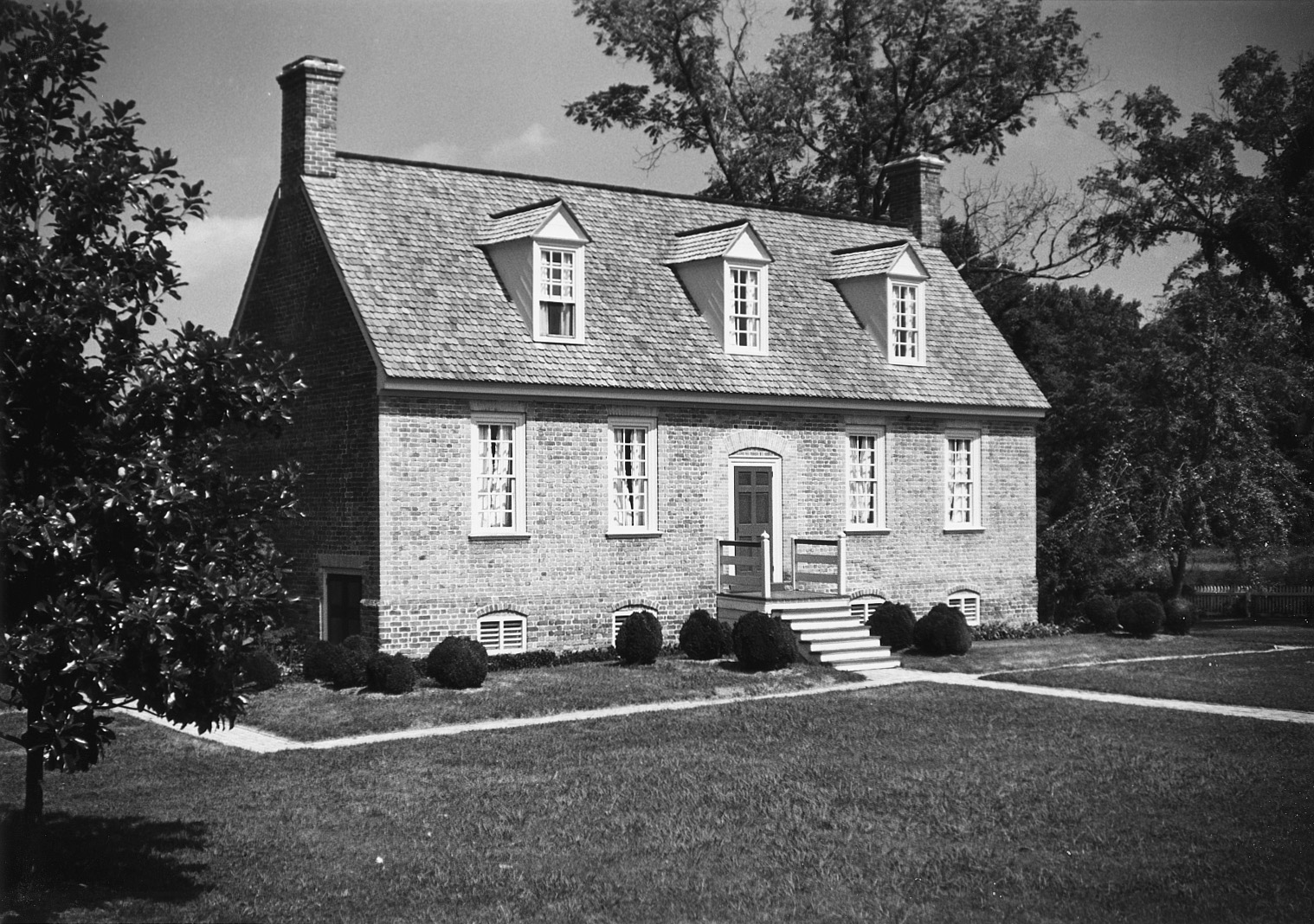
- Front Elevation of 1765 Main House (photo by United States Department of the Interior)
- Location: Surry County, Virginia, United States of America
- Coordinates: 37°9′50″N 76°49′12″W
- Built: 1765; 261 years ago
- NRHP reference No.: 73002065
- VLR No.: 090-0022

Significant dates
- Added to NRHP: November 14, 1973
- Designated VLR: October 16, 1973

- Smith's Fort
- U.S. National Register of Historic Places
- Virginia Landmarks Register
- Location within Virginia Location within the United States
- Nearest city: Surry, Virginia
- Area: 5 acres (2.0 ha)
- Built: 1609; 417 years ago
- NRHP reference No.: 70000827
- VLR No.: 090-0022

Significant dates
- Added to NRHP: June 15, 1970
- Designated VLR: December 2, 1969

Smith's Fort Plantation is a house and parcel of land located in Surry County, Virginia, United States. The current main house on the property, also known as the Faulcon House, dates from about 1765. It was also known the past as the Warren House and Rolfe-Warren House, as some believed that the house was built in the mid-1600s. The house has been an example for numerous twentieth century reproductions.

== History ==
The plantation received its name because it was the location of Captain John Smith's "New Fort," built in 1609, located directly across the James River from the Jamestown colony. The fort was quickly abandoned due to dry rot and a rat infestation. The same land was later given by Chief Powhatan to John Rolfe as a dowry for the hand of Pocahontas when Rolfe and Pocahontas married. Archaeological surveys of the property have revealed that a number of structures have existed on the property and the present, restored main house was built by Jacob Faulcon about 1765. Previously it was believed by many that the house was built earlier and was owned by Thomas Rolfe and/or Thomas Warren, c. 1650.

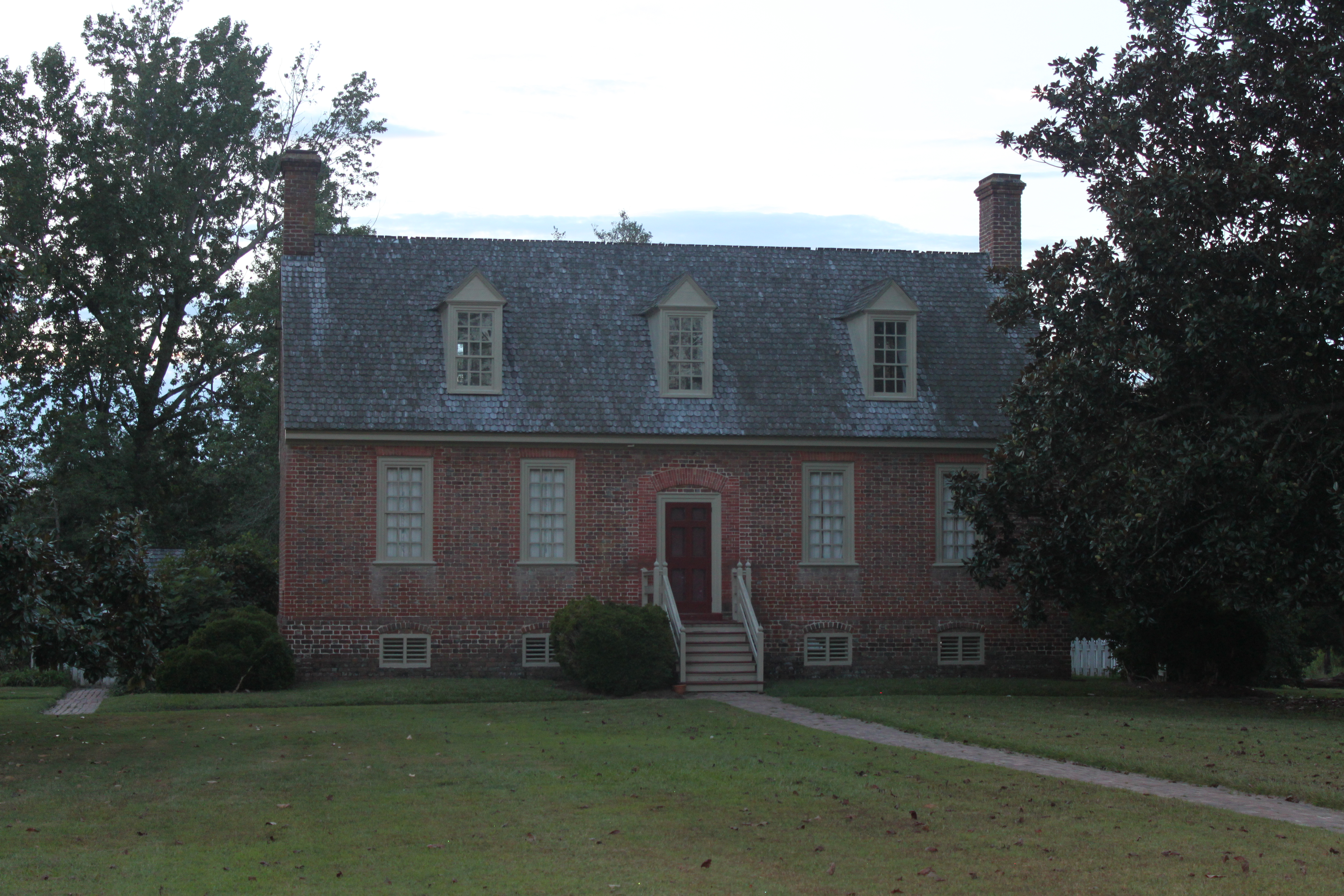
Smith's Fort Plantation house, 2014

== Preservation ==
The property and current house was acquired by Preservation Virginia (formerly known as the Association for the Preservation of Virginia Antiquities) in 1933 after undergoing restoration funded by John D. Rockefeller Jr. It is currently open as a museum with furnishings from the late 16th through the early 18th centuries. The property serves as a host to the annual Old Virginia Christmas-Festival of Crafts.

== Archaeological investigations ==
Smith wrote of this fort that it was "neere a convenient River upon high commanding hill, very hard to be assaulted an easie to be defended." The Association for the Preservation of Virginia Antiquites maintains the site now, whose location matches Smith's description. Hume suggests that it makes sense that Smith's description of the fort as a "retreat," makes this site a likely spot for trading parties to seek refuge.

Archaeological investigations over the site have been limited to the excavations of a ditch and a highly eroded rampart. Further archaeological work to determine if this site was indeed the site of Smith's fort would be necessary. Hume notes that this site does seem to be the site of Smith's fort because the construction type is very similar in nature to the types of earthworks built on Ronoake Island.
