= Rogers' Store =

Historic commercial building in Virginia, United States

- U.S. National Register of Historic Places
- Virginia Landmarks Register
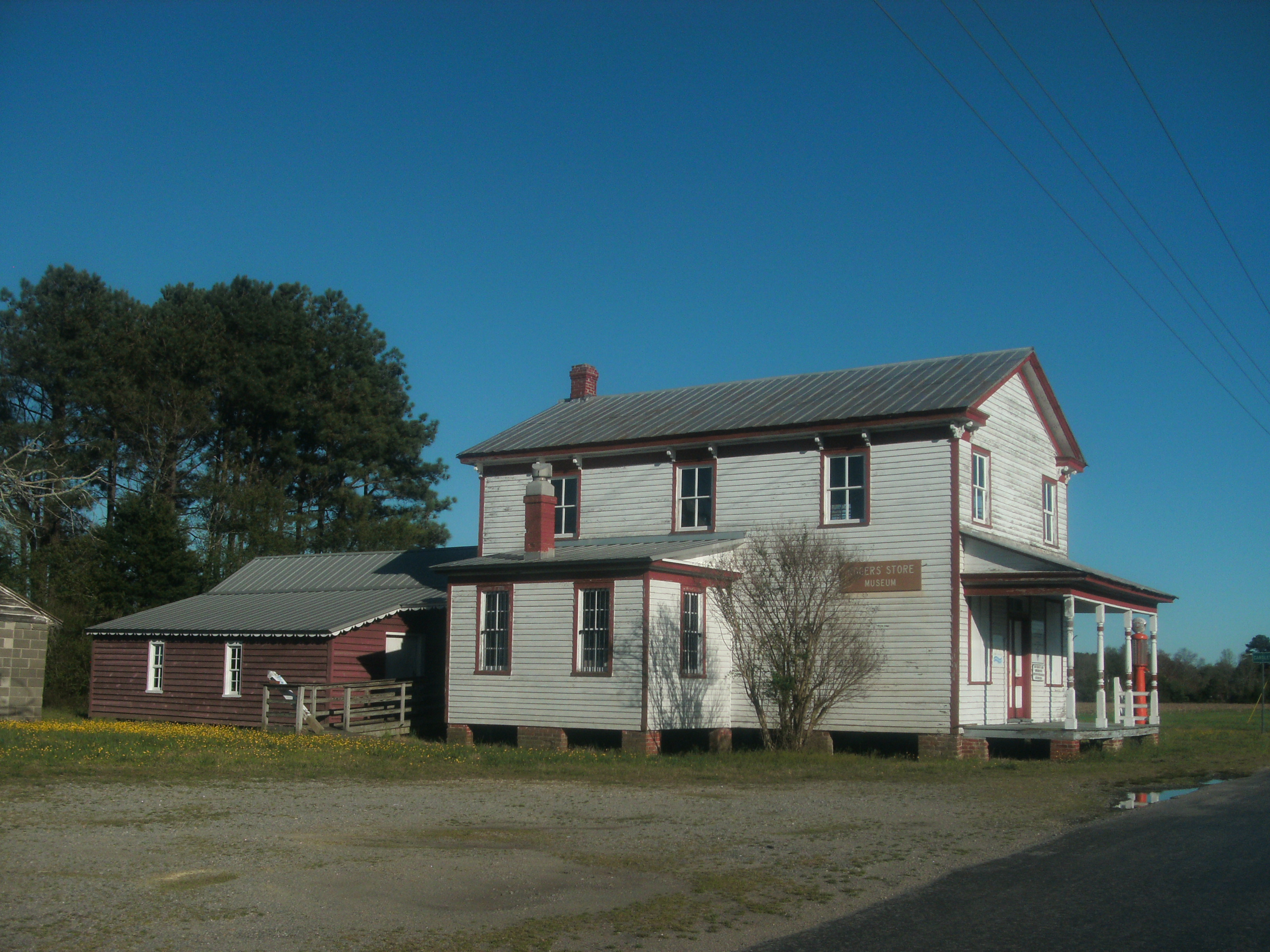
- Rogers' Store, April 2017

- Location within Virginia Location within the United States
- Location: Jct. of VA 615 and VA 612, Carsley, near Surry, Virginia
- Coordinates: 37°5′44″N 77°0′15″W
- Area: 1.3 acres (0.53 ha)
- Built: 1827, c. 1894
- Architectural style: Late Victorian
- NRHP reference No.: 02000595
- VLR No.: 090-5011

Significant dates
- Added to NRHP: May 30, 2002
- Designated VLR: March 13, 2002

Rogers' Store, also known as Gwaltney's Store, is a historic general store located at Carsley near Surry, Surry County, Virginia. It was built about 1894, and is a two-story, three bay by three bay, Late Victorian frame building with a front gable roof. It features a full-width front porch supported by turned posts and a standing seam metal shed roof. Located directly behind the Rogers' Store is the Gwaltney's Store building. It was built in 1827, and is a 1 1/2-story, two room, gable front frame building. With the construction of the new store in 1894, the old store was converted to storage space. The store closed in 1952.

The Rogers' Store (1827–1952) acted as an early post office, pharmacy, radio assembly and repair shop, a publishing company, lumber company, chemical company and the Surry-Sussex Telephone Company. Throughout its history, Gwaltney's Store and then Rogers' Store has been the town center for the people of Carsley. Rogers Store was acquired by the Surry Historical Society in 1999.

It was listed on the National Register of Historic Places in 2002.
