= Thomas Chevers =

Anglo-Irish Virginia landowner (1630–1664)

- Born: c. 1630; Dublin, Kingdom of Ireland
- Died: 1664 (aged 33–34); Surry County, Virginia Colony, British America
- Occupations: Farmer; surgeon; archivist
- Era: Colonial America
- Children: 4

Thomas Chevers (c. 1630 – 1664) was an Irish-born Virginia farmer, surgeon, and archivist. Born into the Anglo-Irish gentry, he was a trained surgeon, and had also filled the position of archivist at the Trinity College Dublin. He eventually fled to the American colonies—acquiring land there—at the advent of Cromwellian settlement in Ireland, a development that had ended his family's prosperity on the island.

== Background ==
Thomas Chevers was born around 1630 in Dublin, Ireland, to Anglo-Irish parents, John Chevers and Catherine FitzWilliam.

Being Anglo-Irish, the Chevers family, originally from England, had settled in Ireland, where they acquired estates and became established in local society. The family's landholdings were greatly affected by the Cromwellian settlement, which led to widespread land confiscations from Anglo-Irish families. Consequently, the Chevers family chose to emigrate, eventually settling in the American colonies.

== Settlement in Virginia ==
Upon migration, Thomas Chevers's occupation was recorded as a "chiurgeon" (surgeon) upon his arrival in Virginia, but there is no evidence of his formal medical training or practice in the colonies. He was also reported to previously be an archivist at Trinity College Dublin.

On May 20, 1659, Thomas Chevers purchased approximately 1,100 acres of land from Ralph Creed in Surry County, Virginia. The land was described in the deed as including "houses, orchards, gardens, woods, ways and waters." Chevers's land was situated near Sunken Marsh and was previously occupied by Richard Hill.

His arrival in Virginia was said to have been accompanied by family and livestock. He engaged in agriculture and husbandry, including the cultivation of orchards.

Chevers also actively participated in local affairs, including serving on a grand jury in Isle of Wight County in June 1658.

== Family and later life ==
Thomas Chevers died in 1664 in Surry County, where he had been residing since his initial arrival in the New World; his will, though missing, was dated February 8. Following his death, his children were left orphans, and they later dispersed. His son William claimed his inheritance in 1681; his daughter Petronella and his son John later settled in Maryland, where they were involved with local Quaker communities. Their surname would go on to be spelled in a variety of alternative ways, including Shivers, Chivers, Cheevers, and Chavis.
