= Preservation Virginia =

Historical site management organization

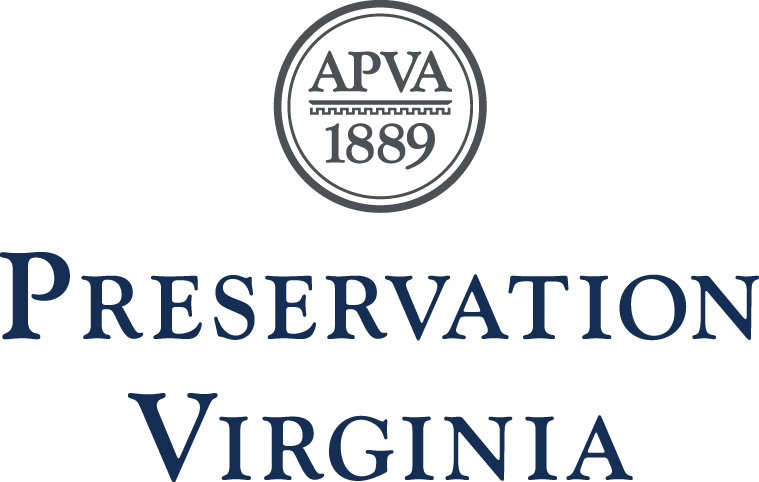
- Founded: 1889
- Purpose: Historic Preservation
- Location: 204 W. Franklin Street, Richmond, Virginia
- Region served: Commonwealth of Virginia
- Key people: CEO [Will Glasco]
- Website: http://www.preservationvirginia.org/
- Formerly called: Association for the Preservation of Virginia Antiquities; APVA Preservation Virginia; APVA

Founded in 1889, the Association for the Preservation of Virginia Antiquities was the United States' first statewide historic preservation group. In 2003 the organization adopted the new name APVA Preservation Virginia to reflect a broader focus on statewide Preservation and in 2009 it shortened its name to Preservation Virginia. Preservation Virginia owns historic sites across Virginia including Historic Jamestowne, located at Jamestown, Virginia, site of the first permanent English settlement in North America, and the Cape Henry Light house, one of the first public works projects of the United States of America.

== Organization ==
Preservation Virginia has helped preserve several key historic properties and items. Its 1889 rescue of the Powder Magazine in Williamsburg, Virginia, came decades before Colonial Williamsburg's creation. Its mission is similar to organizations such as the National Trust for Historic Preservation in the U.S. and The National Trust in Britain, however Preservation Virginia also seeks to cultivate an awareness of the importance of Virginia's heritage as an "economic asset".

The organization's branches represent Preservation Virginia across the state; in Richmond, Preservation Virginia's self-governing affiliate is Historic Richmond Foundation, which merged in July 2005 with Preservation Virginia's William Byrd Branch.

Preservation Virginia also operates the statewide revolving fund, which protects historic properties with easements before placing them on the market, and organizes an annual Preservation Conference. Starting in 1994, a major archaeological campaign conducted by Preservation Virginia at Jamestown known as Jamestown Rediscovery has discovered the remains of the original 1607 settlement, and greatly increased the knowledge of Jamestown.

=== Revolving Fund Program ===
Preservation Virginia has operated a revolving fund program since 1989. The program is dedicated to saving historic property in Virginia that is at risk of destruction from either demolition or severe neglect.

== Historic sites ==
Preservation Virginia museum sites include:

- Bacon's Castle, North America's oldest English brick house, in Surry
- Cape Henry Lighthouse, the first federal public works project under President George Washington, in Virginia Beach
- Historic Jamestowne, the site of the London Company settlement of May 1607
- John Marshall House, the home of Chief Justice of the Supreme Court John Marshall in Richmond
- Patrick Henry's Scotchtown, the Hanover County home of Patrick Henry, revolutionary and first Virginia Governor
- Smith's Fort Plantation in Surry
- Cole Digges House in Richmond – open by appointment, serves as the headquarters for Preservation Virginia

=== Legacy properties ===
Preservation Virginia owned and restored many historic properties that are now owned and operated as museums by other organizations. Some of the properties are open on a limited basis or by appointment.

- Farmers' Bank in Petersburg
- Northampton County Court Green in Eastville, Virginia
- Old Isle of Wight Courthouse in Smithfield
- Old Stone House, part of and operated by the Edgar Allan Poe Museum in Richmond
- Pear Valley in Northampton County
- Smithfield Plantation in Blacksburg
- Thomas Read's Clerk's Office, part of the Museum of Charlotte County
- Walter Reed Birthplace in Belroi, Virginia

Preservation Virginia formerly operated several sites in Fredericksburg, which are now operated by Washington Heritage Museums.

- Hugh Mercer Apothecary
- Mary Washington House
- Rising Sun Tavern
- St. James' House
