= Rich Neck Farm =

Historic house in Virginia, United States

- U.S. National Register of Historic Places
- Virginia Landmarks Register
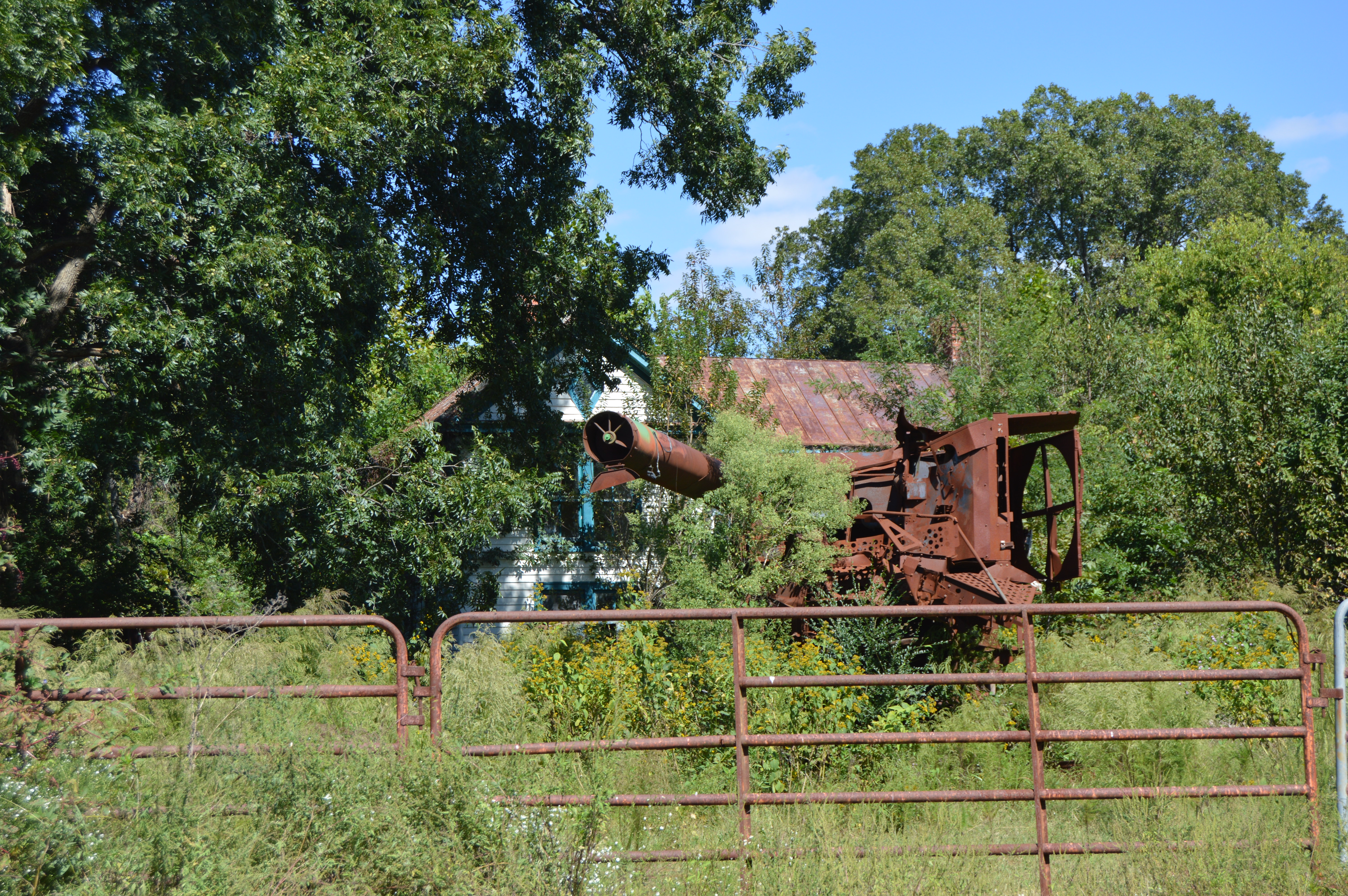
- Abandoned office building and burned combine harvester at Rich Neck

- Location within Virginia Location within the United States
- Location: E of Surry, near Surry, Virginia
- Coordinates: 37°7′33″N 76°45′5″W
- Area: 6 acres (2.4 ha)
- Built: c. 1802
- Architectural style: Pre-Georgian
- NRHP reference No.: 80004229
- VLR No.: 090-0021

Significant dates
- Added to NRHP: May 19, 1980
- Designated VLR: July 17, 1975

Rich Neck Farm, also known as Richneck Plantation, was a historic home and farm located near Surry, Surry County, Virginia. The house was built about 1802, and was a 1 1/2-story, five-bay, double pile, central-hall plan brick dwelling in a pre-Georgian style. It had a gambrel roof with dormers and sat on a high basement. Long connected with the Ruffins, one of the prominent families of Southside Virginia, Rich Neck possessed a collection of buildings which were among the best preserved and most noteworthy of their type in the region. Original sashes, most of the doors, hinges (many with their leather washers), locks, and other hardware remained. The Ruffin family figured in Virginia's social and intellectual history throughout the colonial and early national periods. Its most notable member was Edmund Ruffin, an ardent secessionist and agricultural pioneer who is considered to be the father of agronomy. Research indicates Rich Neck remained in the Ruffin family until 1865. The house long stood vacant and in a state of disrepair. In 2011 Preservation Virginia listed Rich Neck Farm as one of the most endangered historic sites in Virginia. The house was destroyed by fire in 2012.

Also on the property are two contributing granaries, a smokehouse, office, an outhouse, a well house, and a chicken house.

Rich Neck Farm was listed on the National Register of Historic Places in 1980.
