= Gwaltney Corner, Virginia =

- Unincorporated community
- Location within Virginia Location within the United States
- Coordinates: 37°06′43″N 77°01′26″W
- Country: United States
- State: Virginia
- County: Surry
- Elevation: 112 ft (34 m)
- Time zone: UTC-5 (Eastern (EST))
  - Summer (DST): UTC-4 (EDT)
- Area codes: 757, 948
- GNIS feature ID: 1477384

Gwaltney Corner is an unincorporated community in Surry County, Virginia, United States. Gwaltney Corner is located on Virginia State Route 40, 6.5 miles (10.5 km) northeast of Waverly. Snow Hill, a home which is listed on the National Register of Historic Places, is located near Gwaltney Corner. In 1966, a county dump site was proposed here. There are several hog farms in the area.
