= Chippokes State Park =

State park in Virginia, United States

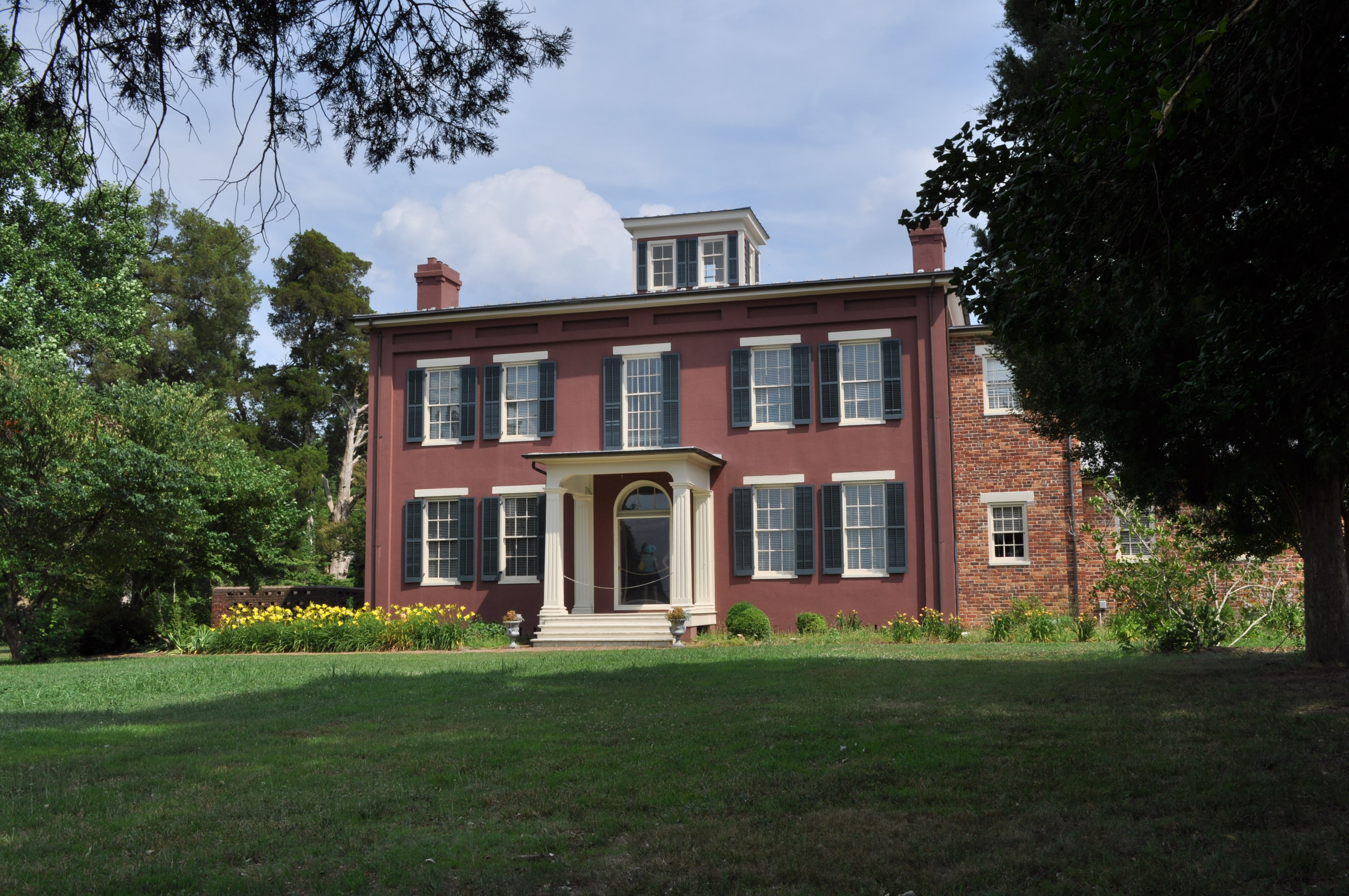
- Jones-Stewart House at Chippokes Plantation

- Location within Virginia Location within the United States
- Location: Surry County, Virginia
- Nearest city: Newport News
- Coordinates: 37°8′12″N 76°43′39″W
- Area: 1,947 acres (787.9 ha)
- Established: 1967
- Administrator: Virginia Department of Conservation and Recreation
- Visitors: 173,110 (in 2020)
- Chippokes Plantation
- U.S. National Register of Historic Places
- U.S. Historic district
- Virginia Landmarks Register
- Area: 1,403 acres (567.8 ha)
- Built: 1829
- Architectural style: Italianate
- NRHP reference No.: 69000283
- VLR No.: 090-0070

Significant dates
- Added to NRHP: October 1, 1969
- Designated VLR: November 5, 1968, July 15, 1986

Chippokes State Park (previously known as Chippokes Plantation State Park) is a Virginia state park on the south side of the James River on the Captain John Smith Chesapeake National Historic Trail. In addition to forests and fossil hunting on the beach, it includes three historic houses (plus outbuildings to each) as well as an open-air agricultural and forestry museum with seasonally appropriate events. Other recreational facilities include a visitor center, swimming pool, hiking trails, cabins, yurts and campgrounds. As of 2020, the yearly visitation was 173,110. It is located at 695 Chippokes Park Road, in rural Surry County, Virginia off Route 10.

== History ==
Chippokes Plantation derives its name from Choapoke, the contact-era weroance of the Quiyoughcohannock people. The Quiyoughcohannock were a part of the Powhatan Confederacy, with ancestral lands bounded by Upper Chippokes Creek and Lower Chippokes Creek. There were at least four towns in the nearly 100 square-mile territory, which drew their success from agriculture, trade, and the local waterways. The Quiyoughcohannock lands were ceded to English colonists by 1619.

As an Ancient Planter, a settler who had lived at the Jamestown settlement for 10 years, Captain William Powell was granted the 750-acre Chippokes Plantation tract in 1619 by the Virginia Company. Powell died just four years later in 1623. Chippokes Plantation passed to his infant son, George, in the care of Powell's widow, Margaret Powell Blaney West. When George Powell died childless in his early twenties, the plantation was sold to the Osburne family, and repurchased by Governor William Berkeley around the time of Bacon's Rebellion. When Berkeley died in England in 1677, Chippokes passed to his widow, Lady Frances Culpeper Berkeley, who then married Philip Ludwell I.

Ludwells would own Chippokes Plantation for nearly 150 years, and operate it as nonresidents, using local white male overseers and enslaved workers. Notable Ludwells who owned Chippokes Plantation include Philip Ludwell III, the first known Orthodox Christian in America, and his daughter, Lucy Ludwell Paradise. Although she spent most of her life in England, Lucy managed to become close friends with Thomas Jefferson and John and Abigail Adams. After returning home to Virginia in 1805, she inhabited the Ludwell–Paradise House across the James River in Williamsburg, which still stands today.

Chippokes Plantation received its first non-absentee owner in centuries in 1837. Albert Carroll Jones, a wealthy 22-year-old from nearby Isle of Wight County, first lived at Chippokes in the circa 1830 River House, built as a summer residence by previous owner Charles Osborne. Jones doubled the footprint of the River House in 1847, and planted orchards of apple, fig and other trees which he used to distill brandy. After his first wife, Anne Baskerville Jones, died in 1850, Albert began constructing a grand Italianate manor, the Jones-Stewart Mansion. Jones had moved to Petersburg, but returned to Chippokes, where he lived during and after the Civil War with his daughter, Mary Ann Jones, and his mother, Mary Anne Carroll Jones. Local tradition claims that this farm was spared by both Federal and Confederate troops who battled and raided in the area (and destroyed other plantations), because Jones provided those valued beverages to both sides. Just before the Civil War, when Jones' prosperity as a planter and distiller was at its height, Chippokes was home to 47 enslaved individuals, at least one of whom stayed on after the war. Jones died in 1882, leaving the property to pass through the hands of multiple family members before arriving at auction in 1918.

Victor Stewart and Thornton Jeffress, co-proprietors of the Petersburg-based Colonial Pine Company, bought Chippokes at this auction. Their intention was to timber the property, but Victor and his wife, Evelyn, decided to take up residence at Chippokes instead. Starting in the 1920s, the Stewarts restored the historic mansion and formal gardens. With no children to will the property to, the Stewarts instead chose to leave Chippokes Plantation to the Commonwealth of Virginia, with the stipulation that it would become a recreational park. Chippokes Plantation State Park opened to the public in 1970.

Noted for its continued agricultural production, today Chippokes Plantation is one of the oldest continuously farmed properties in North America, having just passed its 400th anniversary. As a State Park, Chippokes offers modern recreational facilities, a swimming pool, visitor center, trails, camping, and cabin rentals. Ranger-led programs include historic house tours, guided hikes, craft workshops, costumed interpretation, and more. The park is also noteworthy for a section of riverfront that exhibits a large amount of miocene and pliocene marine fossil deposits.

== Chippokes Farm & Forestry Museum ==
Opened in June 1990, the Chippokes Farm and Forestry Museum is an open-air farm museum. Exhibits across the five-building complex provide insight into the lives of Tidewater Virginia farmers from 1619 to 1950. Educational displays include reconstructions of historic farmhouse interiors, workshops of rural craftspeople, and traditional agricultural equipment. The museum also highlights the role of forestry in the rural Tidewater economy in the twentieth century. Living exhibits include heritage breed animals and a Cultural Garden, both of which interpret agricultural components of Chippokes Plantation's 400-year history. The museum is self-guided and open for tours the first weekend of March through the first weekend of December.

== Walnut Valley Plantation ==
In 2004, Walnut Valley Plantation was added to Chippokes State Park. Established in 1636, it is a 550-acre plantation adjoining Chippokes Plantation to the southwest. The parcel contains the oldest plantation house in the park, the Walnut Valley House, constructed around 1770. Equally noteworthy is the restored 1816 slave quarter, among the oldest remaining in Virginia. Today, the restored 18th-century house is a secluded lodge available for rental.

== Captain John Smith Chesapeake National Historic Trail ==
Since 2007, this Virginia park has been part of the 3000 mile Captain John Smith Chesapeake National Historic Trail, the first national water trail.

== See also ==
- List of Virginia state parks
