= Surry County Courthouse Complex =

- U.S. National Register of Historic Places
- Virginia Landmarks Register
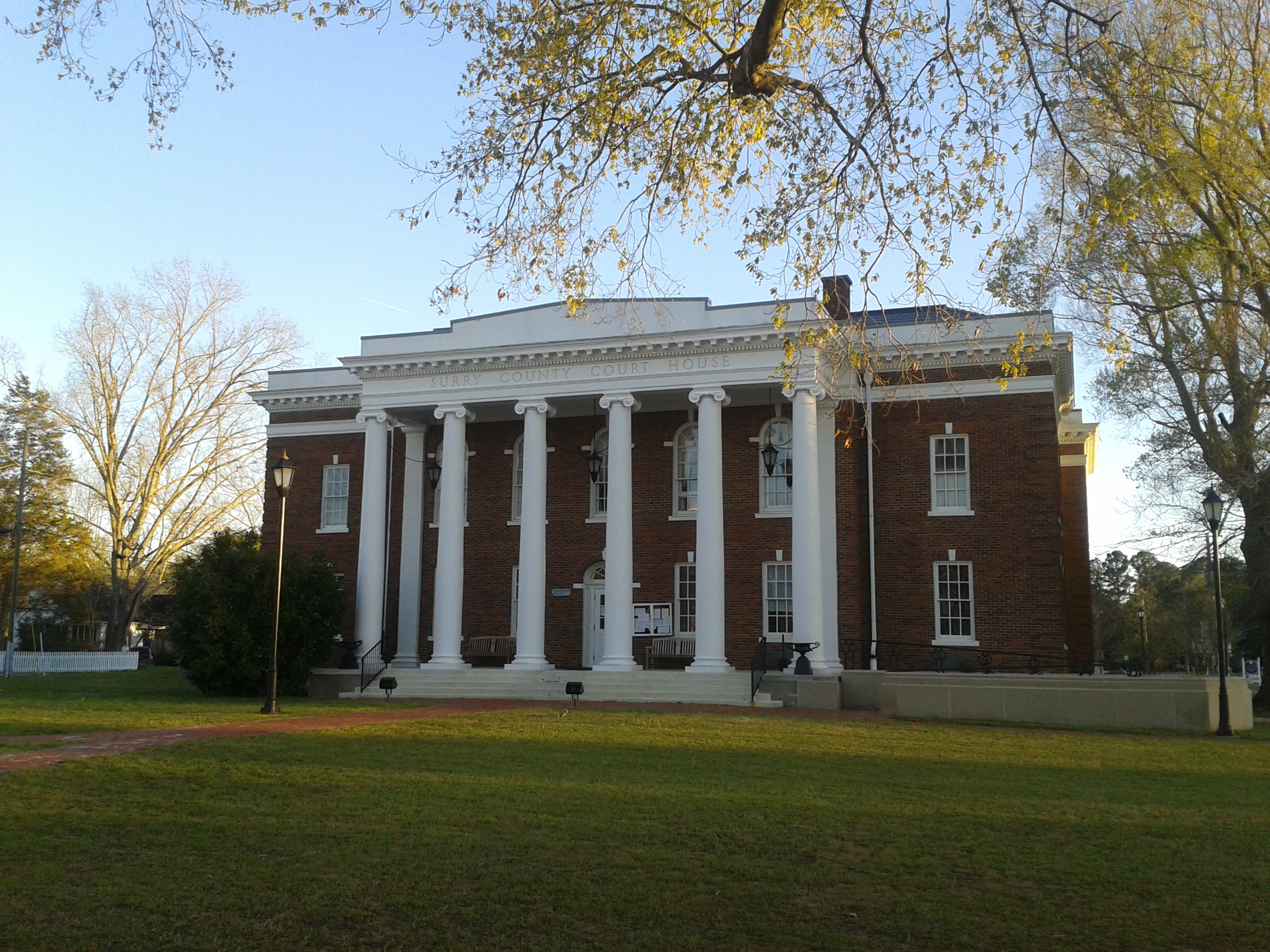
- Surry County Courthouse Complex, April 2017

- Location within Virginia Location within the United States
- Interactive map showing the location of Surry County Courthouse Complex
- Location: VA 10, Surry, Virginia
- Coordinates: 37°8′14″N 76°50′7″W
- Area: 2 acres (0.81 ha)
- Built: 1825
- Architect: Hopkins, John P.; Et al.
- Architectural style: Classical Revival
- NRHP reference No.: 86000719
- VLR No.: 308-0008

Significant dates
- Added to NRHP: April 10, 1986
- Designated VLR: December 17, 1985

Surry County Courthouse Complex is a historic courthouse complex located at Surry, Surry County, Virginia. The complex consists of the county courthouse, old clerk's office (1825–1826), VPI Extension office (c. 1907), the Commonwealth Attorney's office, the Commissioner of Revenue's office, a storage building, a Confederate memorial, and general district court building (c. 1840). The county courthouse building was built in 1923, and is a two-story, seven-bay, Classical Revival style brick building. It features a hexastyle Ionic order portico that dominates its front facade.

It was listed on the National Register of Historic Places in 1986.
