= Snow Hill (Gwaltney Corner, Virginia) =

Historic house in Virginia, United States

- U.S. National Register of Historic Places
- Virginia Landmarks Register
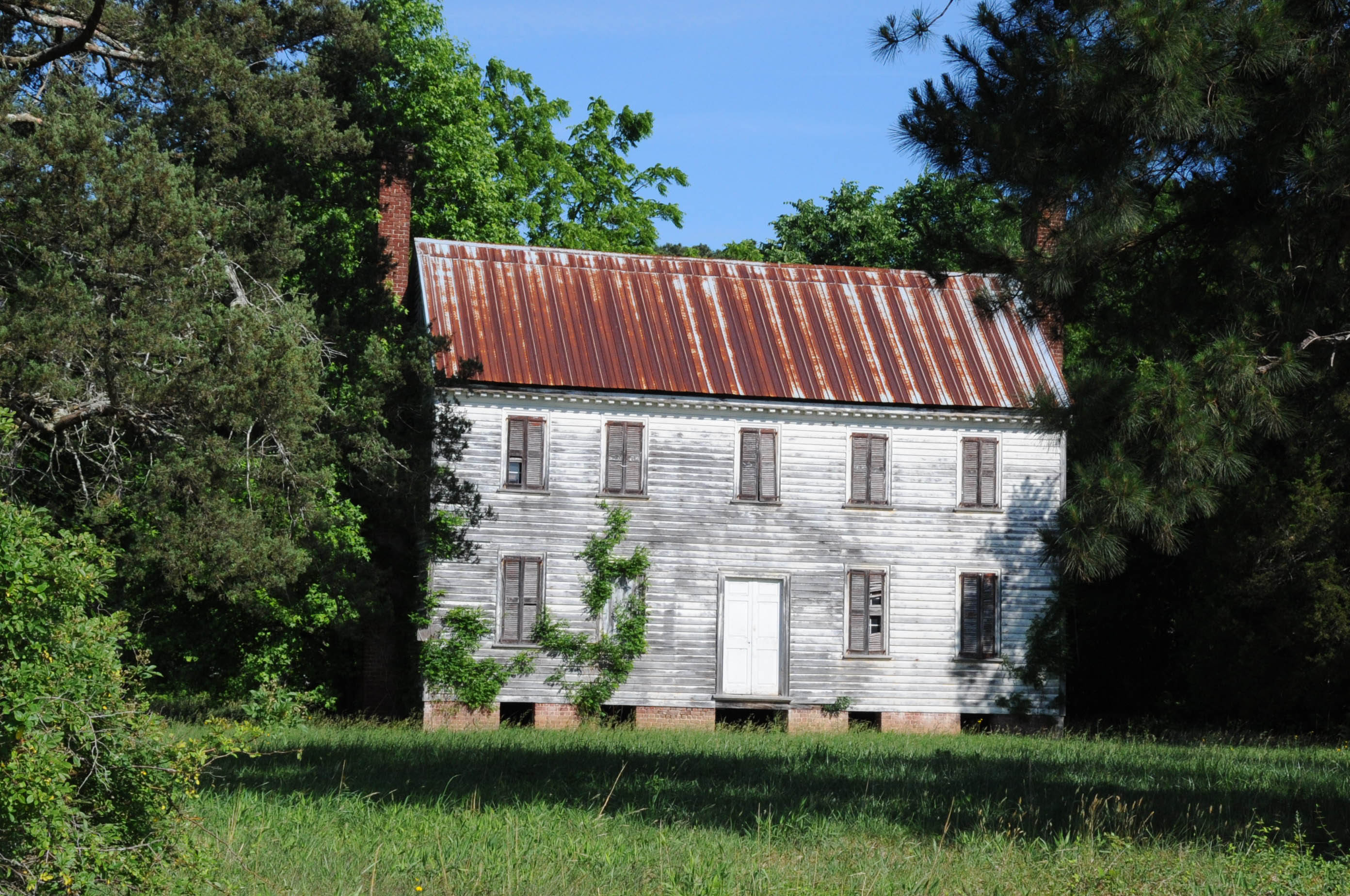
- House in 2018

- Location within Virginia Location within the United States
- Location: VA 40, near Gwaltney Corner, Virginia
- Coordinates: 37°05′19″N 77°02′58″W
- Area: 10 acres (4.0 ha)
- Built: 1836
- Architectural style: "I" House
- NRHP reference No.: 79003091
- VLR No.: 090-0040

Significant dates
- Added to NRHP: December 28, 1979
- Designated VLR: September 18, 1979

Snow Hill, also known as Booth House, is a historic home located near Gwaltney Corner, Surry County, Virginia. It was built in 1836, and is a 2 1/2-story, five-bay, I-house style frame dwelling. It has a gable roof, exterior end chimneys, and a single pile, central-hall plan. The interior features special decorative treatment of the woodwork in imitation of fine woods and marbles.

It was listed on the National Register of Historic Places in 1979.

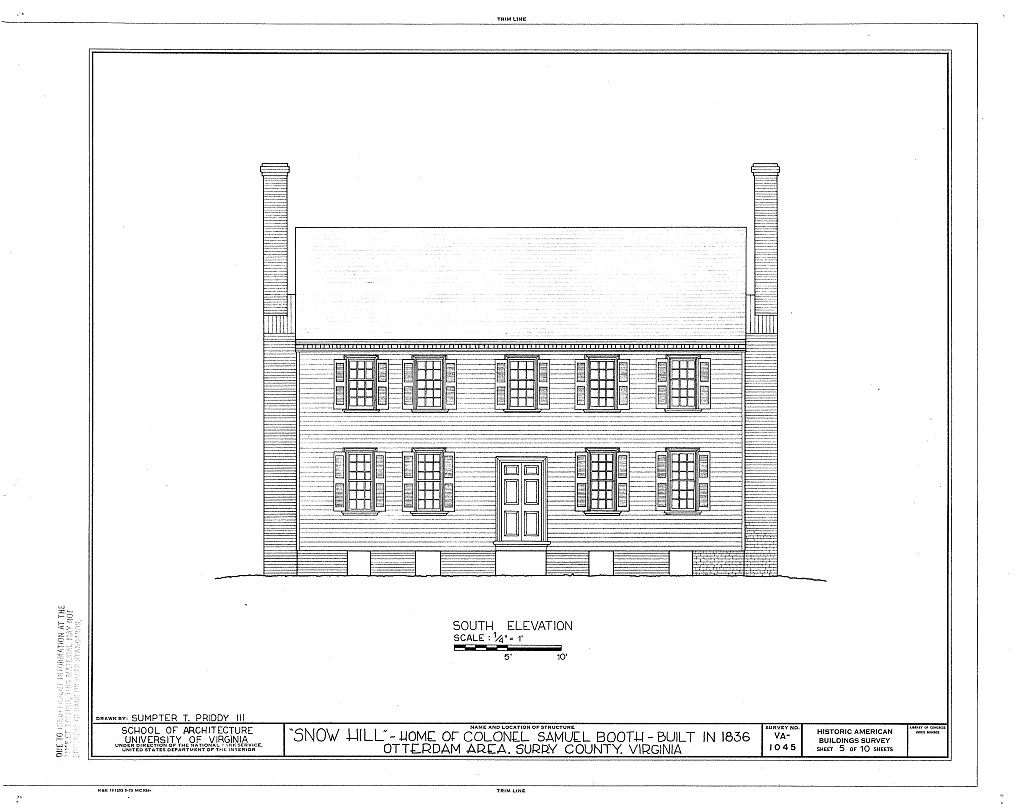
HABS drawing of Snow Hill
