= Melville (Surry, Virginia) =

Historic house in Virginia, United States

- U.S. National Register of Historic Places
- Virginia Landmarks Register
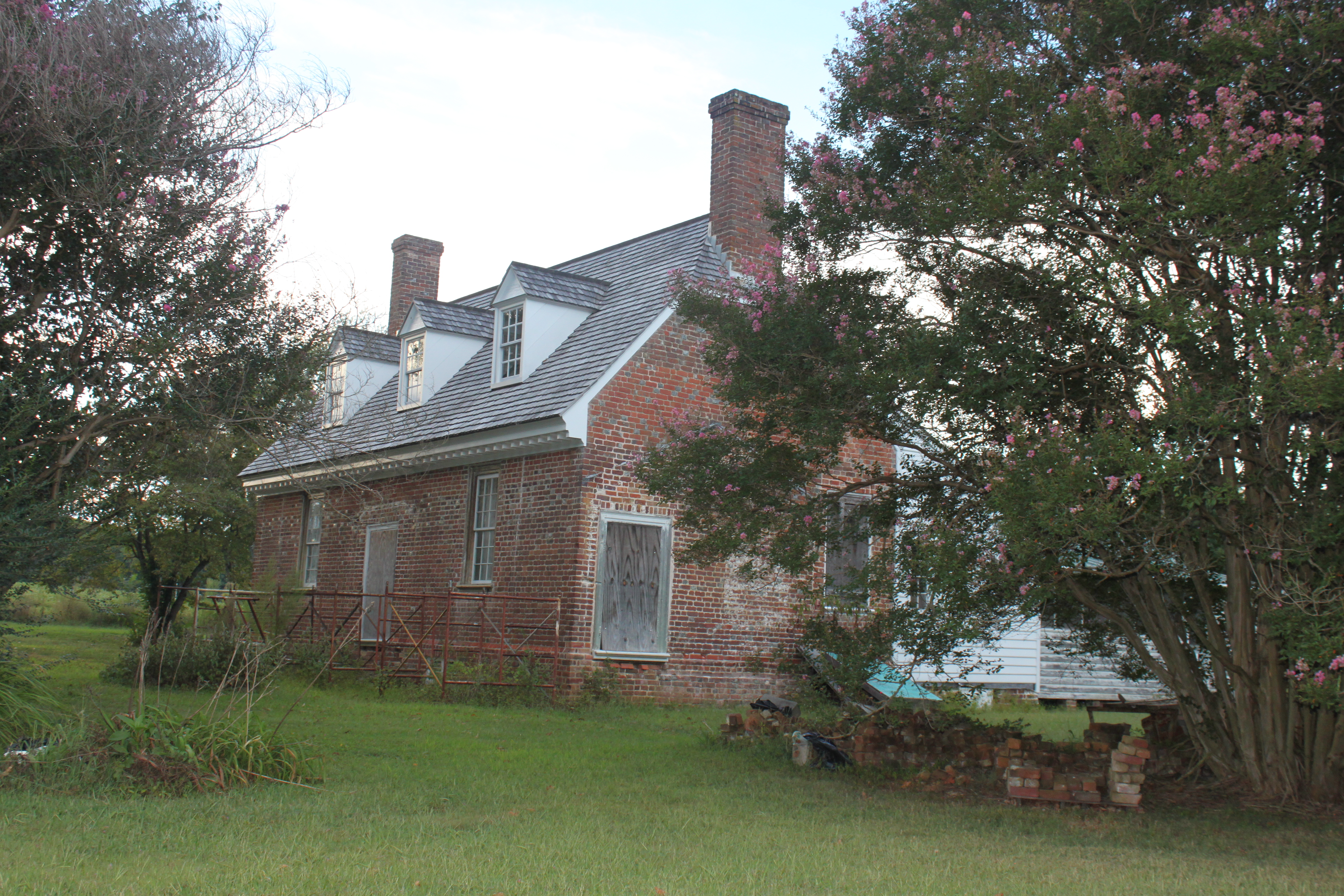

- Location within Virginia Location within the United States
- Location: East of Surry, Virginia
- Coordinates: 37°08′31″N 76°47′24″W
- Area: 20 acres (8.1 ha)
- Built: c. 1727
- NRHP reference No.: 80004228
- VLR No.: 090-0013

Significant dates
- Added to NRHP: May 6, 1980
- Designated VLR: December 21, 1976

Melville is a historic home located near Surry, Virginia. It was built about 1727, and is a 1 1/2-story, hall-parlor plan brick dwelling. It has a clipped gable roof with three pedimented dormers and features tall interior end chimneys. It has a frame shed roofed addition in the rear dated to the early 19th century and a screened front porch and wing dated to the early 20th century.

It was listed on the National Register of Historic Places in 1980.

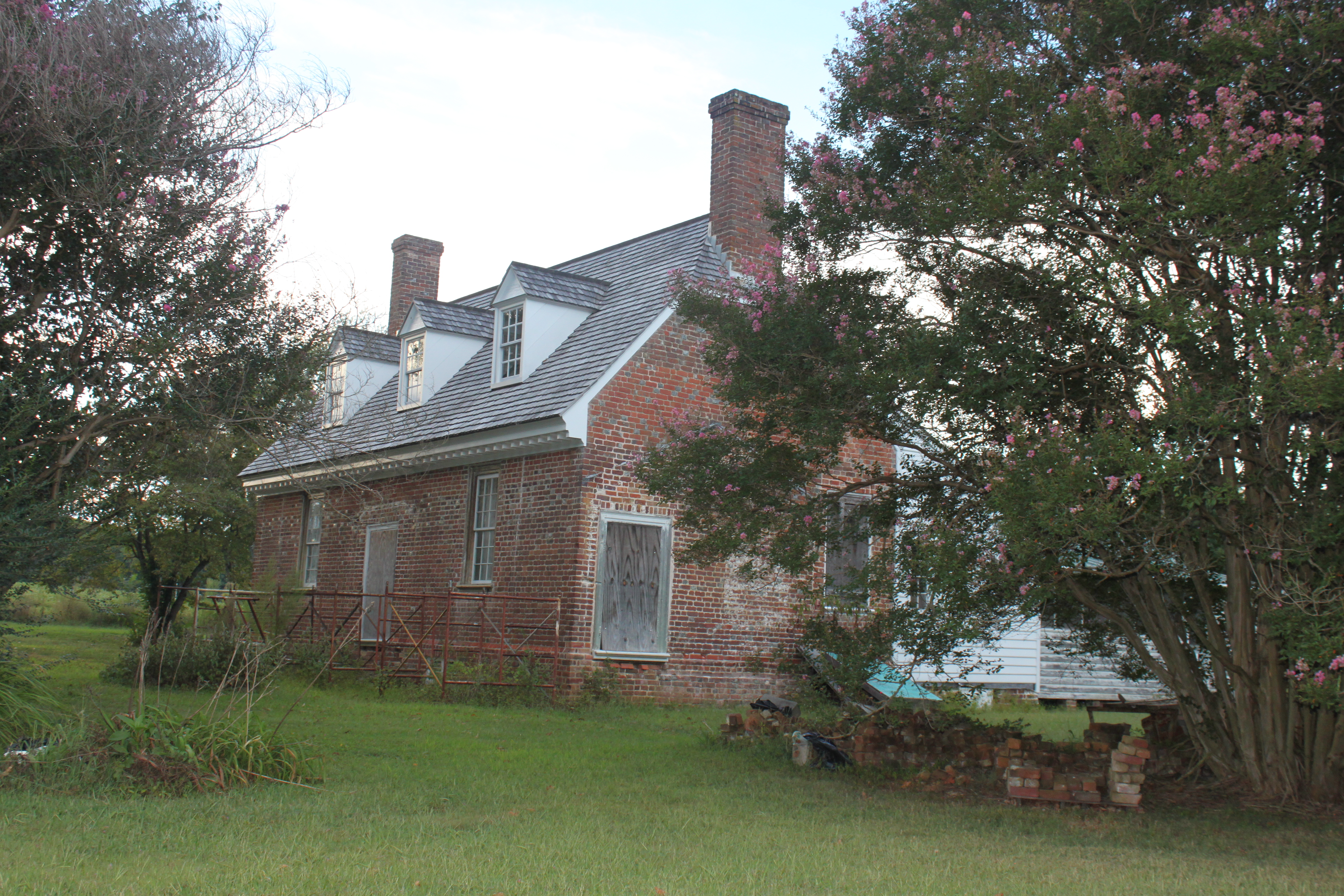
Melville, east of Surry
