= Carsley, Virginia =

- Unincorporated community
- Location within Virginia Location within the United States
- Coordinates: 37°05′45″N 77°00′21″W
- Country: United States
- State: Virginia
- County: Surry
- Elevation: 121 ft (37 m)
- Time zone: UTC-5 (Eastern (EST))
  - Summer (DST): UTC-4 (EDT)
- Area codes: 757, 948
- GNIS feature ID: 1477180

Carsley is an unincorporated community in Surry County, Virginia, United States.

Carsley is located at the intersection of Virginia State Routes 615 (Carsley Road), 40 and 612 (Otterdam Road) north of Waverly and Dendron. The land comprising the community is named for the Carsleys, who owned the land as early as 1812. The Carsley family is the namesake for the area, though the original land grant was given to John Parsons by the King of England on June 5, 1736.

A focal point in Carsley is "Rogers' Store" which is listed in the National Register of Historic Places with the United States Department of the Interior.
