= Dendron, Virginia =

- Town
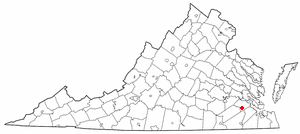
- Location of Dendron, Virginia
- Coordinates: 37°2′40″N 76°56′5″W
- Country: United States
- State: Virginia
- County: Surry

Area
  - Total: 3.57 sq mi (9.24 km^{2})
  - Land: 3.57 sq mi (9.24 km^{2})
  - Water: 0 sq mi (0.00 km^{2})
- Elevation: 118 ft (36 m)

Population (2020)
  - Total: 251
  - Density: 70.4/sq mi (27.2/km^{2})
- Time zone: UTC-5 (Eastern (EST))
  - Summer (DST): UTC-4 (EDT)
- ZIP code: 23839
- Area codes: 757, 948
- FIPS code: 51-22160
- GNIS feature ID: 1492862

Dendron is a town in Surry County, Virginia, United States. The population was 251 at the 2020 census. Sculptor Leslie Garland Bolling was born in Dendron, as was mayor of Hopewell, Virginia, Curtis W. Harris.

== Geography ==
Dendron is located at 37°2′40″N 76°56′5″W (37.044516, -76.934737).

According to the United States Census Bureau, the town has a total area of 3.6 square miles (9.2 km^{2}), all land.

== History ==
Dendron was originally a mill town, built and run by the Surry Lumber Company to house employees of its sawmill. The village was known as Mussel Fork Village until 1896 when it was renamed "Dendron." The name was derived from δένδρον, the Greek word for tree. The years after 1896 saw rapid growth and expansion of the sawmill and the town. More people moved to Dendron and additional Company housing was built. By 1906, Dendron had a population of 1513 people, 298 dwellings, two hotels, eighteen Company stores and five churches. By 1928, Dendron's population had reached nearly 3,000 people. In addition to those establishments listed above, there was also a post office, two schools, a jail, two banks, two doctors, a skating rink, a movie theater, and a number of non-company-owned businesses, such as a drug store, barber shops, garages, cleaning establishments, a pool room, a restaurant, a bakery and an ice cream parlor.

The company also operated a narrow gauge railroad known as Sussex, Surry and Southampton Railway that transported logs to its sawmill in Dendron, and lumber to its wharf on the James River. It also offered passenger service to Dendron and other small towns along its route. One of its steam locomotives built in 1891 was sold to Argent Lumber company in 1926. It was later bought by Midwest Central Railroad in 1960. Completely restored it is still in operation as Midwest Central Railroad's flagship locomotive.

Production peaked in 1920, and the company did not replant after it cut trees. By 1925, most of the area's old growth timber was exhausted. The Surry Lumber Company shut its Dendron sawmills on October 27, 1927. With its major employer gone, the town lost population rapidly, as did nearby Sedley, Vicksville, and Central Hill. The following year, the company began dismantling and selling its equipment and buildings, leaving Dendron without a railroad, water system or electricity.

In February 1931, a fire swept through what was left of Dendron, destroying twenty-one buildings along Main Street and erasing much of what was left of the once prosperous town. A decade later, the rival Gray Lumber Company of Waverly, which had long replanted its land with pine seedlings, bought 15,000 acres from the nearly defunct Surry Lumber company, and three other companies soon bought most of the remaining acreage in other counties. The company's headquarters in Dendron was razed in 1970, and the former commissary, converted into a store, burned down in 1989.

== Demographics ==
Historical population
Census	Pop.	Note	%±
1910	1,653		—
1920	1,705		3.1%
1930	671		−60.6%
1940	465		−30.7%
1950	476		2.4%
1960	403		−15.3%
1970	336		−16.6%
1980	307		−8.6%
1990	305		−0.7%
2000	297		−2.6%
2010	272		−8.4%
2020	251		−7.7%
U.S. Decennial Census

=== Racial and ethnic composition ===
Dendron town, Virginia – Racial and ethnic composition Note: the US Census treats Hispanic/Latino as an ethnic category. This table excludes Latinos from the racial categories and assigns them to a separate category. Hispanics/Latinos may be of any race.
Race / Ethnicity (NH = Non-Hispanic)	Pop 2000	Pop 2010	Pop 2020	% 2000	% 2010	% 2020
White alone (NH)	143	101	102	48.15%	37.13%	40.64%
Black or African American alone (NH)	151	156	141	50.84%	57.35%	56.18%
Native American or Alaska Native alone (NH)	0	2	1	0.00%	0.74%	0.40%
Asian alone (NH)	0	0	0	0.00%	0.00%	0.00%
Native Hawaiian or Pacific Islander alone (NH)	0	0	0	0.00%	0.00%	0.00%
Other race alone (NH)	0	0	1	0.00%	0.00%	0.40%
Mixed race or Multiracial (NH)	0	5	0	0.00%	1.84%	0.00%
Hispanic or Latino (any race)	3	8	6	1.01%	2.94%	2.39%
Total	297	272	251	100.00%	100.00%	100.00%

=== 2000 Census ===
At the 2000 census there were 297 people, 106 households, and 75 families in the town. The population density was 83.3 people per square mile (32.1/km^{2}). There were 121 housing units at an average density of 33.9 per square mile (13.1/km^{2}). The racial makeup of the town was 48.82% White and 51.18% African American. Hispanic or Latino of any race were 1.01%.

Of the 106 households 33.0% had children under the age of 18 living with them, 47.2% were married couples living together, 15.1% had a female householder with no husband present, and 29.2% were non-families. 25.5% of households were one person and 17.9% were one person aged 65 or older. The average household size was 2.80 and the average family size was 3.40.

The age distribution was 24.9% under the age of 18, 8.8% from 18 to 24, 22.9% from 25 to 44, 23.9% from 45 to 64, and 19.5% 65 or older. The median age was 38 years. For every 100 females there were 78.9 males. For every 100 females age 18 and over, there were 78.4 males.

The median household income was $41,667 and the median family income was $46,875. Males had a median income of $35,625 versus $20,000 for females. The per capita income for the town was $15,643. About 3.3% of families and 3.9% of the population were below the poverty line, including 2.9% of those under the age of eighteen and 5.0% of those sixty-five or over.
