= Bacon's Castle, Virginia =

Bacon's Castle
- Unincorporated Community
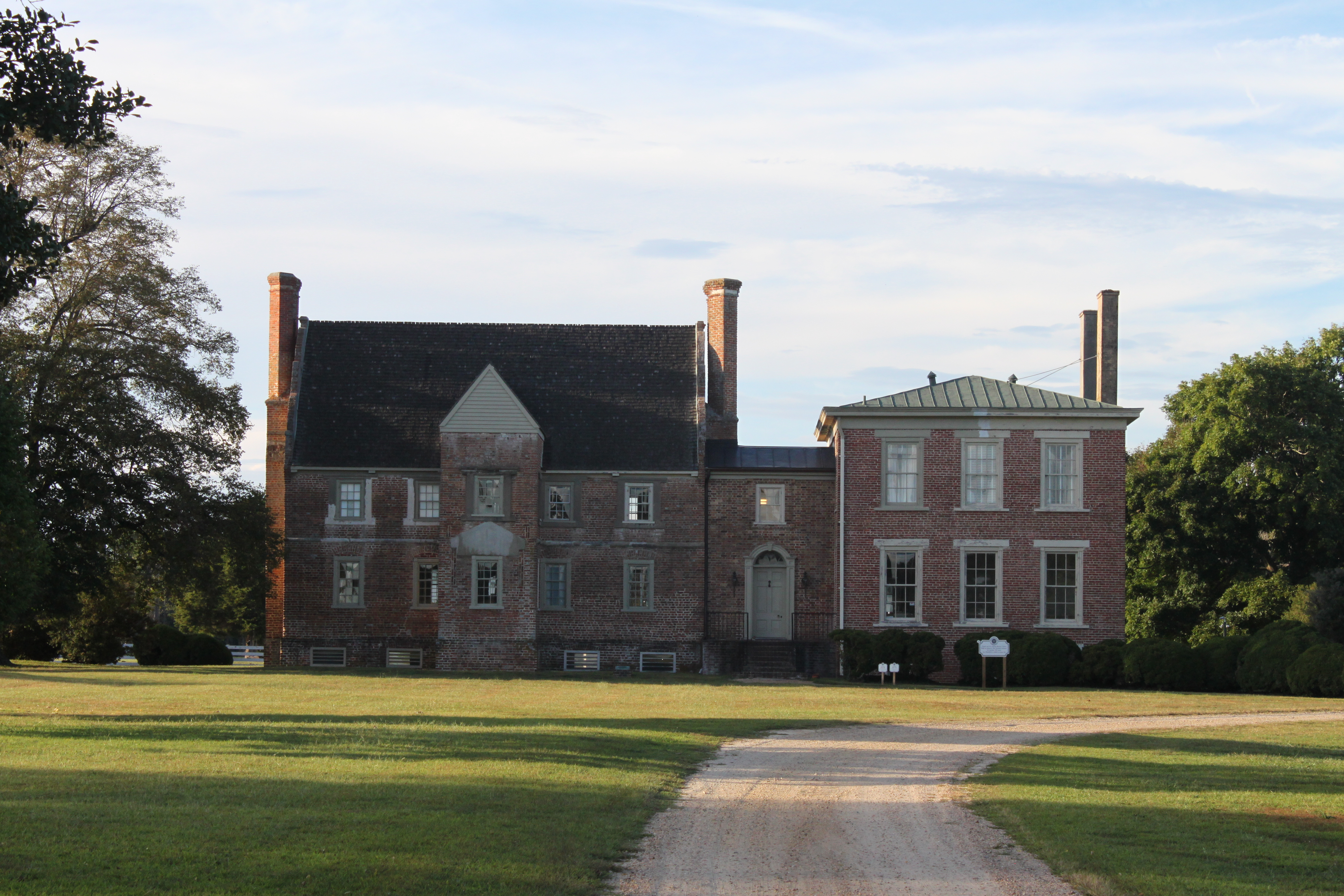
- Country: United States
- State: Virginia
- County: Surry

Bacon's Castle is an unincorporated community in eastern Surry County, Virginia, United States. The population 809 as of 2024. It is located about 14 miles west of Newport News and 30 miles northwest of Norfolk.

== Points of Interest ==
Bacon's Castle is the oldest brick dwelling in North America as it was established in 1665.It gained the name "Bacon's Castle" in 1676.

Hog Island Wildlife Management Area is a Wildlife Management Area that takes up 3908 acres of Hog Island and surrounding areas.
