= Bacon's Castle =

Historic house in Virginia, US

- U.S. National Register of Historic Places
- U.S. National Historic Landmark
- Virginia Landmarks Register
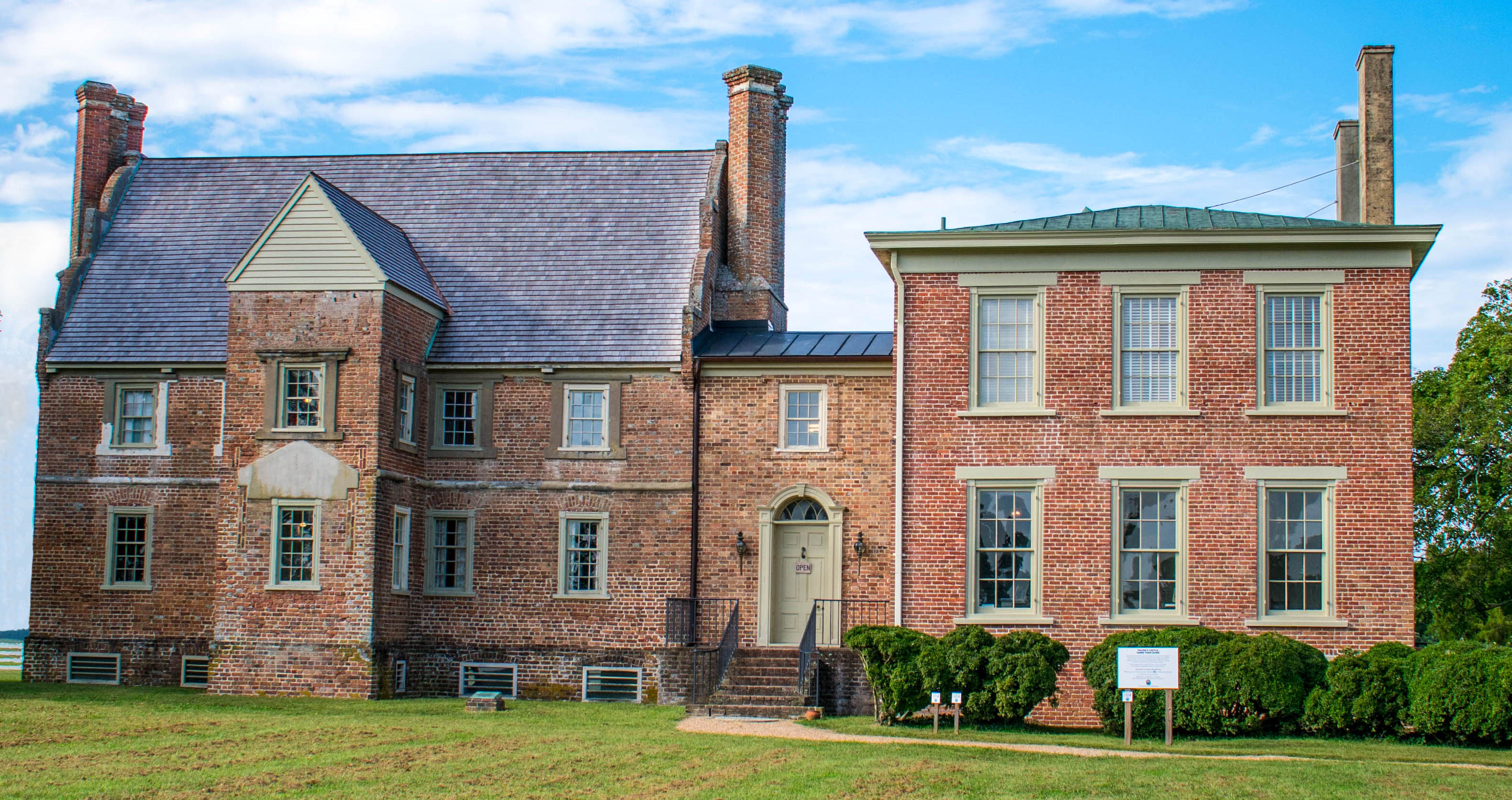
- Bacon's Castle in 2017

- Location within Virginia
- Interactive map showing the location of Bacon’s Castle
- Location: Surry County, Virginia
- Coordinates: 37°06′32.4972″N 76°43′20.5824″W
- Area: Hampton Roads
- Built: 1665; 361 years ago
- Architectural style: Carolean architecture and Greek Revival
- Website: preservationvirginia.org/historic-sites/bacons-castle
- NRHP reference No.: 66000849
- VLR No.: 090-0001

Significant dates
- Added to NRHP: 1966
- Designated NHL: October 9, 1960
- Designated VLR: September 9, 1969

Bacon's Castle (also variously known as "Allen's Brick House" or the "Arthur Allen House") is located in Surry County, Virginia. It is the oldest documented brick dwelling in what is now the United States. Built in 1665, it is noted as an extremely rare example of Carolean architecture in the New World.

The house became known as "Bacon's Castle" because it was occupied as a fort or "castle" by the followers of Nathaniel Bacon during Bacon's Rebellion in 1676. However, contrary to popular folklore, Bacon never lived at Bacon's Castle, nor is he even known to have visited it.

Today Bacon's Castle is an historic house museum and historic site open for guest visitation. Bacon's Castle is an official Preservation Virginia historic site and operates under its 501 (c)(3) not-for-profit status.

== History ==
Soon after Surry County was formed in the English colony of Virginia in 1652, Arthur Allen built a high style Carolean architecture brick house in 1665 near the James River, where he and his wife Alice (née Tucker) Allen lived. He was a wealthy merchant and a Justice of the Peace in Surry County. Allen died in 1669, but his son, Major Arthur Allen II, inherited the house and property. Major Allen was a member of the Virginia House of Burgesses.

About mid-September, 1676, a number of the rebel followers of frontiersman Nathaniel Bacon seized the brick house of Major Allen and fortified it. The garrison, commanded at various times by William Rookings, Arthur Long, Joseph Rogers and John Clements, retained control of the house for over three months while their cause declined. The death of Bacon in October left his forces under the leadership of Joseph Ingram, who proved to be unsuited to the command. Ingram dispersed his army in small garrisons, and as the demoralized troops began to plunder indiscriminately, the condition of the colony soon became deplorable.

Royal Governor Sir William Berkeley began to conquer the isolated posts one by one, some by force and some by persuasion. On December 29, a loyal force aboard the vessel Young Prince, captured an unidentified "fort" which many historians have identified as Bacon's Castle. After withstanding a brief siege early in January, 1677, the loyalists used the "fort" as a base of operations for the last engagements of the rebellion, which ended before the month was out.

The Allen family's brick home became known as "Bacon's Castle" because it was occupied as a fort or "castle" by the followers of Nathaniel Bacon during Bacon's Rebellion in 1676. However, contrary to popular folklore, Bacon never lived at Bacon's Castle, nor is he even known to have visited it. Bacon was the proprietor of Curles Neck Plantation in Henrico County, about 30 miles upriver on the northern bank of the James River. Many historians believe the name "Bacon's Castle" was not used until many years after Bacon's Rebellion. In 1769, the Virginia Gazette newspaper in the capital city of Williamsburg used that name when it published several articles about Bacon's Rebellion.

During the Civil War, Private Sidney Lanier (2nd Battalion, Macon Volunteers), later one of the "Poets of the Confederacy", was stationed at nearby Burwell's Bay from May 1863 to October 1864 with the Confederate signal corps. He and his brother Clifford were devoted friends of the Hankins family, then owners of Bacon's Castle, and the brothers often visited the estate when they were on duty at Burwell's Bay. Virginia Hankins, or Ginna, as she was called, rejected Sidney Lanier's May 1867 proposal of marriage solely because of the obligation she felt towards her motherless younger brothers and sisters, but they remained lifelong friends.

Ginna's brother, James DeWitt Hankins, was a law student at the University of Virginia at the outbreak of the war. He was a member of the Jefferson Society, a literary society at the university. He was commissioned June 22, 1861 as first lieutenant of artillery, Fourth Regiment, Virginia Militia. Later, he was promoted to Captain of the Surry Light Artillery and served through Appomattox. Captain Hankins was killed by William Underwood in a duel on October 18, 1866, at Isle of Wight Courthouse over insults previously exchanged between the two men while drinking in a tavern. The tragedy created intense excitement throughout the Virginia Tidewater where the families of both parties were prominent and well known, and started a long running feud between the Hankins and Underwood families. Despite the fact that dueling had been outlawed in Virginia in 1810 following the famous duel between Alexander Hamilton and Aaron Burr, and the fact that the so-called "duel" was essentially a shootout, Underwood pleaded not guilty at his murder trial on May 16, 1867. On May 30, the jury unanimously voted to acquit.

At the request of Virginia Hankins, Sidney Lanier wrote "In Memoriam" for her brother who had been his friend.

Like other James River Plantations, Bacon's Castle faced the problems of loss of manpower due to the emancipation of slaves, and insurmountable debt following the Civil War. Financially strapped, Ginna's father John Hankins had mortgaged the property prior to his death in 1870. Unable to raise money to pay the mortgage, Virginia Hankins sold the 1,200 acre estate in 1872 to the mortgage holder to pay off the debt and provide for her brothers' and sisters' education. The family moved to Richmond where she became a schoolteacher, learned in Latin, French, and German. She also wrote poetry and an unpublished novel. She never married. She died December 24, 1888, and is buried in Hollywood Cemetery.

William Allen Warren, purchased the estate in 1880 and sold it to his son Charles Allen Warren in 1909. When Charles died in 1931 the estate passed through inheritance to his son Walker Pegram Warren who had been born in the mansion. Walker Warren and his wife used Bacon's Castle as a second home until their deaths in an automobile accident in 1973. The Warrens had no children and, the mansion and outbuildings and 40 acres of the plantation were acquired from their estate by the Association for the Preservation of Virginia Antiquities. The remaining 1,130 acres of the plantation were acquired by Virginia State Senator Garland Gray and later passed through inheritance to his son Elmon T. Gray and remain devoted to agriculture.

== Preservation and later operations ==
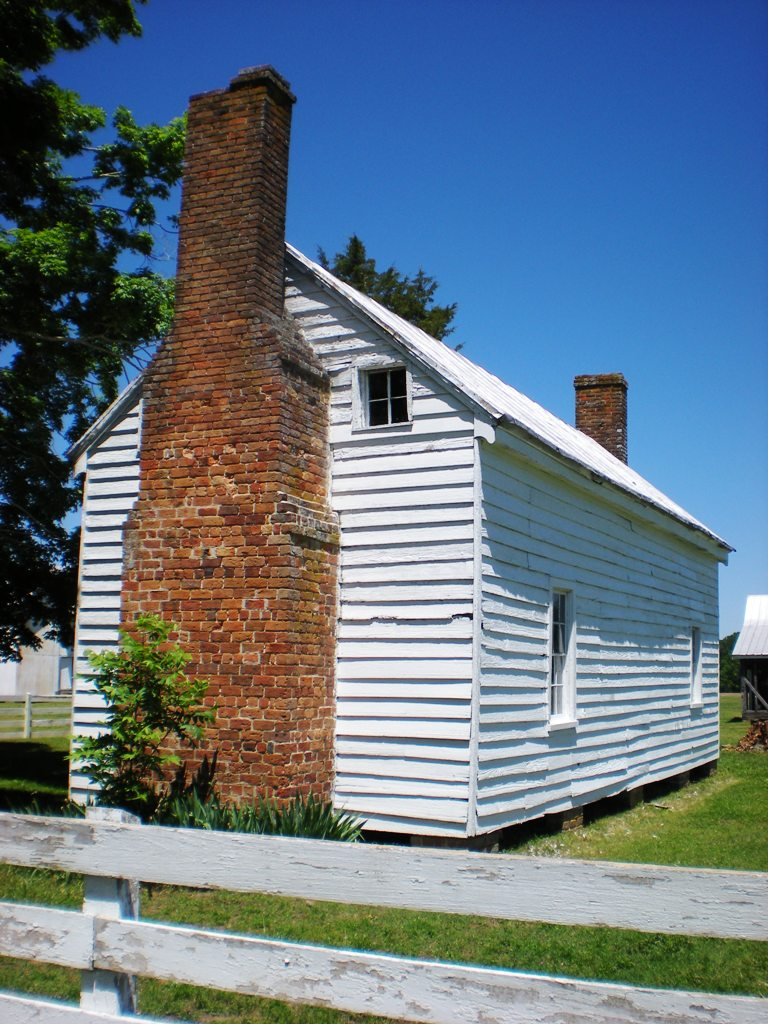
The smokehouse.

Bacon's Castle was acquired by Preservation Virginia (formerly known as the Association for the Preservation of Virginia Antiquities) in the 1970s and restored. Preservation activities continue while guests visit the Site. Bacon's Castle now operates as a house museum and historic site with 40-acres of outbuildings and dependencies including barns, slave and tenant quarters, smokehouses, and a rare example of a 17th-century English formal garden.

In 2015, the Virginia Outdoors Foundation received a $257,996 grant from the Virginia Land Conservation Foundation to help the group purchase a conservation easement on 1,260 acres of privately owned farmland surrounding Bacon's Castle. The easement ensures the land will be permanently protected from residential and commercial development.

== Architecture ==
Bacon's Castle is a rare example of American Carolean architecture and the only surviving "high-style" house from the 17th century. It is one of only three surviving Carolean great houses west of the Atlantic—the other two are in Barbados. They are Drax Hall Estate and the Great House at St. Nicholas Abbey Plantation. Notable architectural features include the triple-stacked chimneys, shaped Flemish gables, and carved compass roses decorating the cross beams in many of the public rooms. The house is listed on the National Register of Historic Places, and was designated a National Historic Landmark in 1960.

Between the mid to late-nineteenth century, Bacon's Castle underwent several modifications. An original one story service wing was replaced by a taller Greek Revival wing. Around this time, the entrance was moved from the center of the main block to the hyphen between the original house and addition, and diamond-pane casement windows were exchanged for double-hung sash windows. Moving the door left a scar in the location of the original pedimented surround. All of these changes were maintained in the restoration.

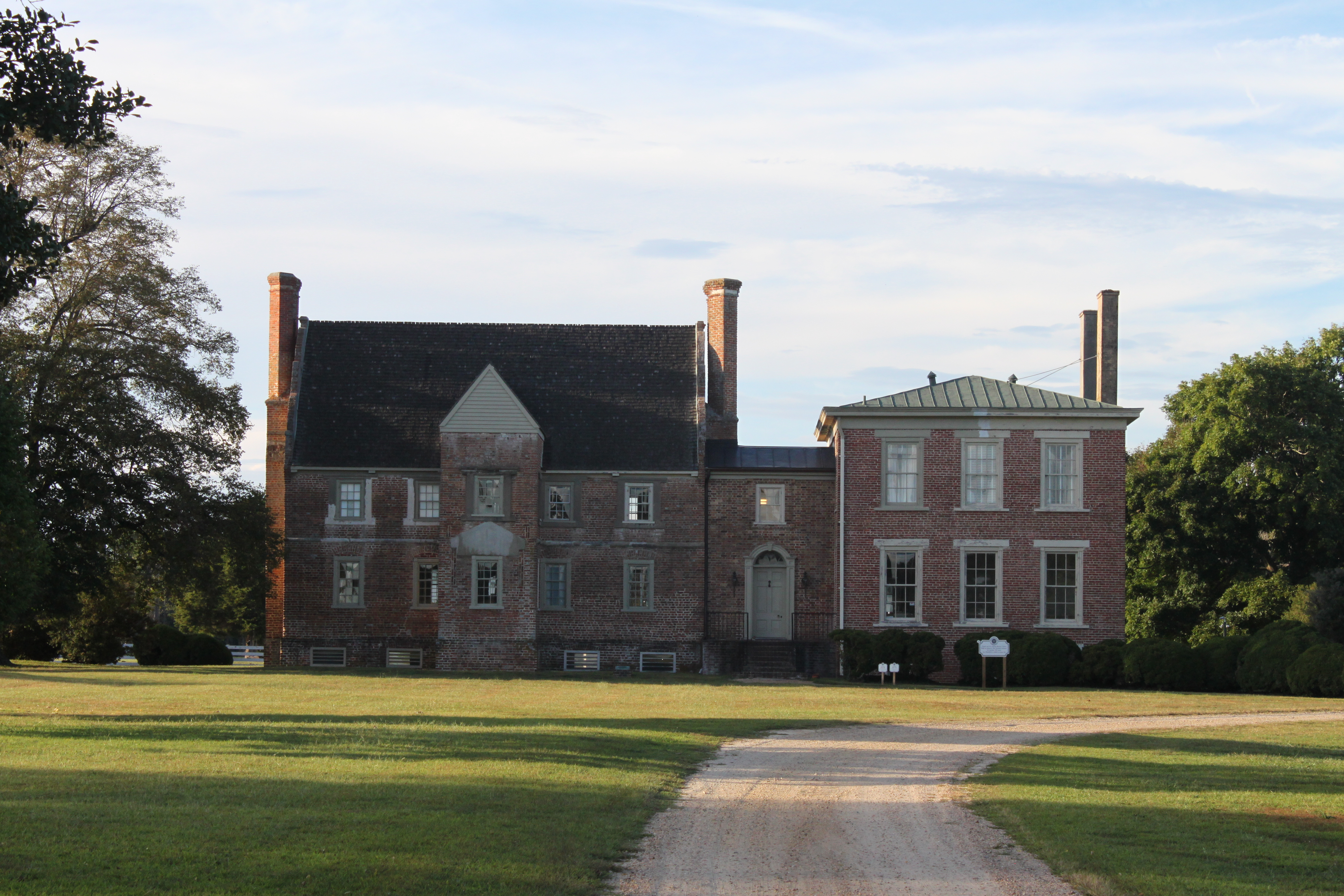
Bacon's Castle, 2014

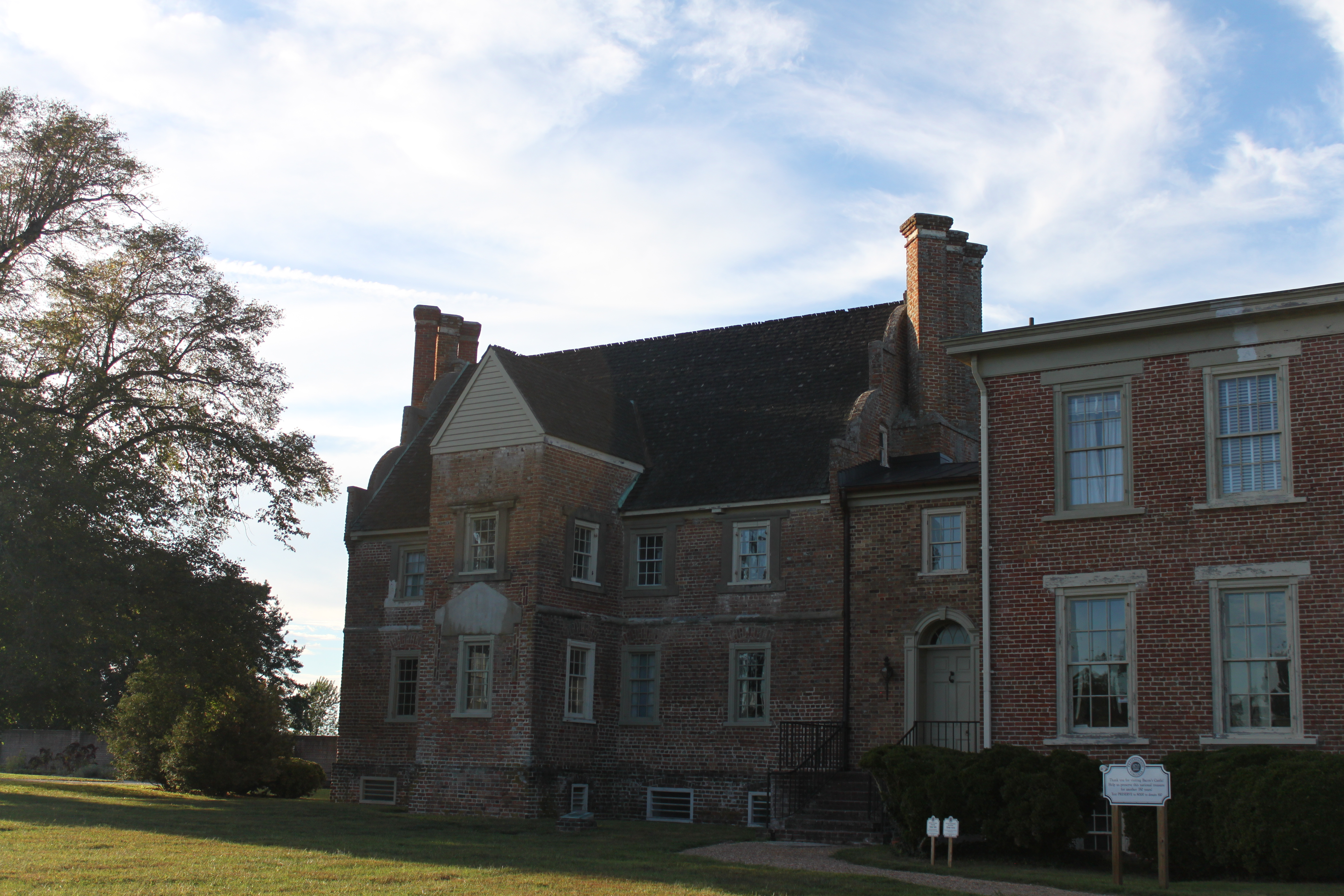
Bacon's Castle, perspective showing chimneys. 2014

== See also ==
- Old Brick Church (Bacon's Castle, Virginia)
- List of the oldest buildings in Virginia
- List of National Historic Landmarks in Virginia
- National Register of Historic Places listings in Surry County, Virginia
