= Surry County, Virginia =

County in Virginia, United States

- County
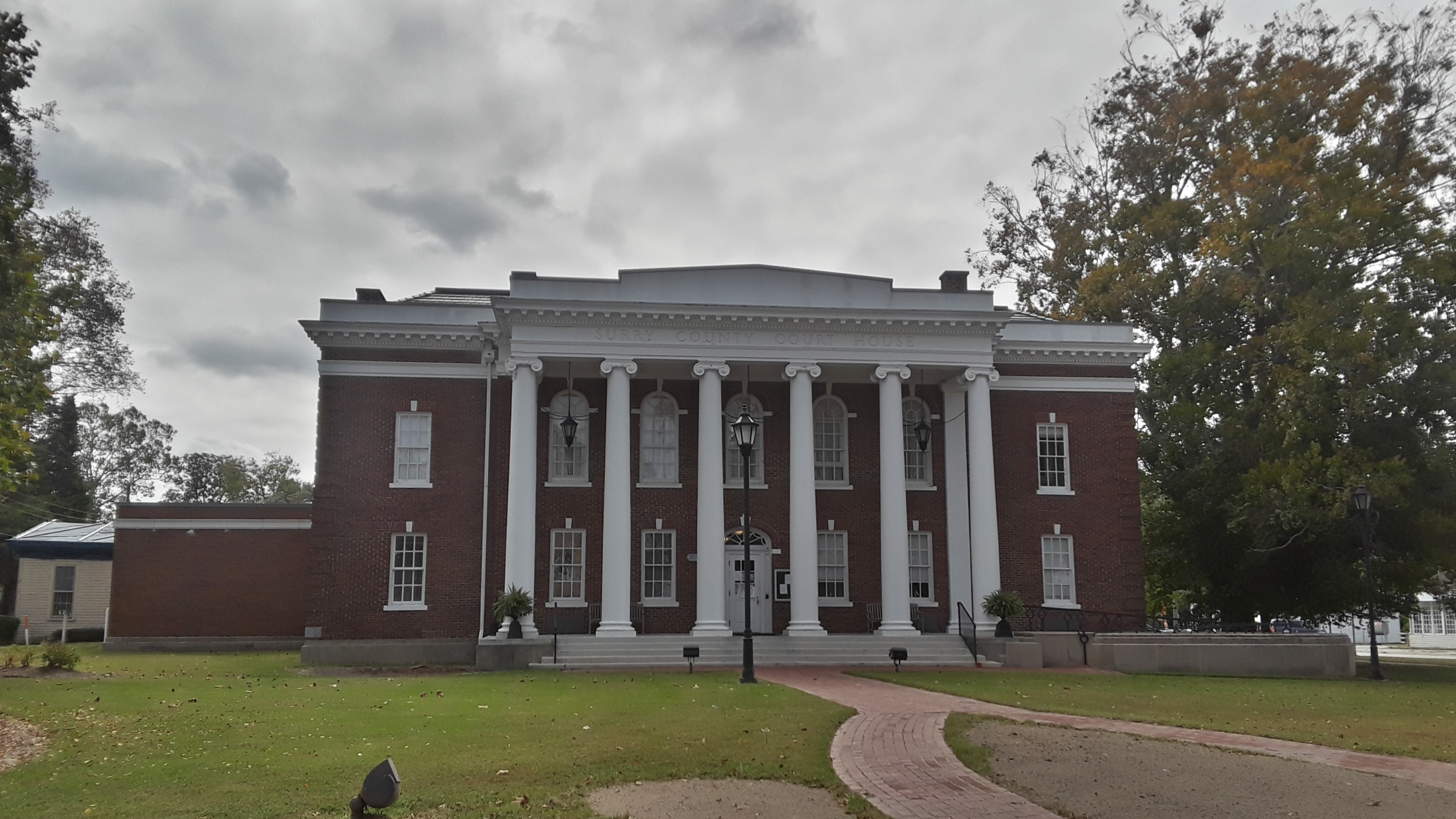

- Seal

- Location within the U.S. state of Virginia
- Coordinates: 37°07′01″N 76°53′18″W
- Country: United States
- State: Virginia
- Founded: 1652
- Named for: Surrey
- Seat: Surry
- Largest town: Claremont

Area
  - Total: 310 sq mi (800 km^{2})
  - Land: 279 sq mi (720 km^{2})
  - Water: 31 sq mi (80 km^{2}) 10.1%

Population (2020)
  - Total: 6,561
  - Estimate (2025): 6,603 ▲
  - Density: 23.5/sq mi (9.08/km^{2})
- Time zone: UTC−5 (Eastern)
  - Summer (DST): UTC−4 (EDT)
- Congressional district: 4th
- Website: www.surrycountyva.gov

Surry County is a county in the southeastern part of the Commonwealth of Virginia. As of the 2020 census, the population was 6,561.

In 1652, Surry County was formed from the portion of James City County south of the James River. For more than 350 years it has depended on an agricultural economy. The county has 19 sites listed on the National Register, including a landmark occupied in 1676 known as Bacon's Castle and Chippokes Plantation (now a state park). The Jamestown Ferry provides easy access to Virginia's Historic Triangle, featuring Jamestown, Williamsburg, and Yorktown, linked by the National Park Service's Colonial Parkway.

The county is known for farming, curing Virginia Hams, and harvesting lumber, notably Virginia pine.

== History ==
During the times of the Virginia Colony, Surry County was formed in 1652 from a portion of James City County (one of the original 8 counties formed in 1634) south of the James River. It was named for the English county of Surrey. Surry County initially consisted of two parishes of the Church of England: Lawne's Creek and Southwark.

Nearby, in 1665, Arthur Allen built a Jacobean brick house. A decade later it became known as Bacon's Castle because it was occupied as a fort or "castle" during Bacon's Rebellion against the Royal Governor, Sir William Berkeley. (Nathaniel Bacon never lived at Bacon's Castle, but rather at Curles Neck Plantation in Henrico County, about 30 miles upriver on the James River's northern bank).

The first town, Cobham, was established in 1691 at the mouth of Gray's Creek, where it flows into the James River. Neighboring Sussex County was formed from the southwestern end of Surry County in 1754. After the American Revolutionary War, during which the British Legion looted the county, Surry County became part of the new Commonwealth of Virginia, one of the first 13 United States.

During the American Civil War, the Confederate Army included the Surry Light Artillery and the Surry Cavalry.

In 1873, a New Jersey timberman, David Steele, with financing from Baltimore interests, began a lumber business in Surry County but went bankrupt a decade later. Baltimore investors Waters and Company incorporated the Surry Lumber Company in 1885. In 1886 it incorporated the Surry, Sussex, and Southampton Railway, which delivered lumber to Scotland wharf on the James River (now the Jamestown Ferry terminal). The company (headquartered at Sedley, Virginia) and SS&S railroad grew, reaching their heyday around 1920. But the company did not replant after it cut the old-growth pine, and found further logging in the area difficult after 1925.

In 1927, it closed its mills in Dendron, Virginia, causing considerable economic distress in the county. The railway went bankrupt in 1930. Gray Lumber Company of Waverly, Virginia, which replanted its timber cuts, bought 15,000 acres from the Surry Lumber Company in 1941, and other companies soon bought the rest of the company's acreage.

The Temperance, Industrial and Collegiate Institute, a school for black Americans, was located in Surry County from 1892 to 1928. A Virginia State Historic Marker is located at the site of the former campus in Claremont, and a memorial to the school's founder, John Jefferson Smallwood, is located at the Abundant Life Church Cemetery in Spring Grove.

As part of Virginia's "Massive Resistance" to integration following Brown v. Board of Education, Surry County closed its white public schools so no black students could attend. Foundation's School, a private, whites-only school was established. Grants and other provisions were made to provide public support for private education for the white students affected.

The two-unit Surry Nuclear Power Plant was commissioned in 1972 and 1973 and is expected to remain active until 2053.

== Transportation ==
=== Major highways ===
- US 460
- SR 10
- SR 31
- SR 40

State Route 31 and State Route 40 bisect the county. Its major artery is the historic path along the south bank of the James River now known as State Route 10 between Prince George County and Isle of Wight County.

== Geography ==
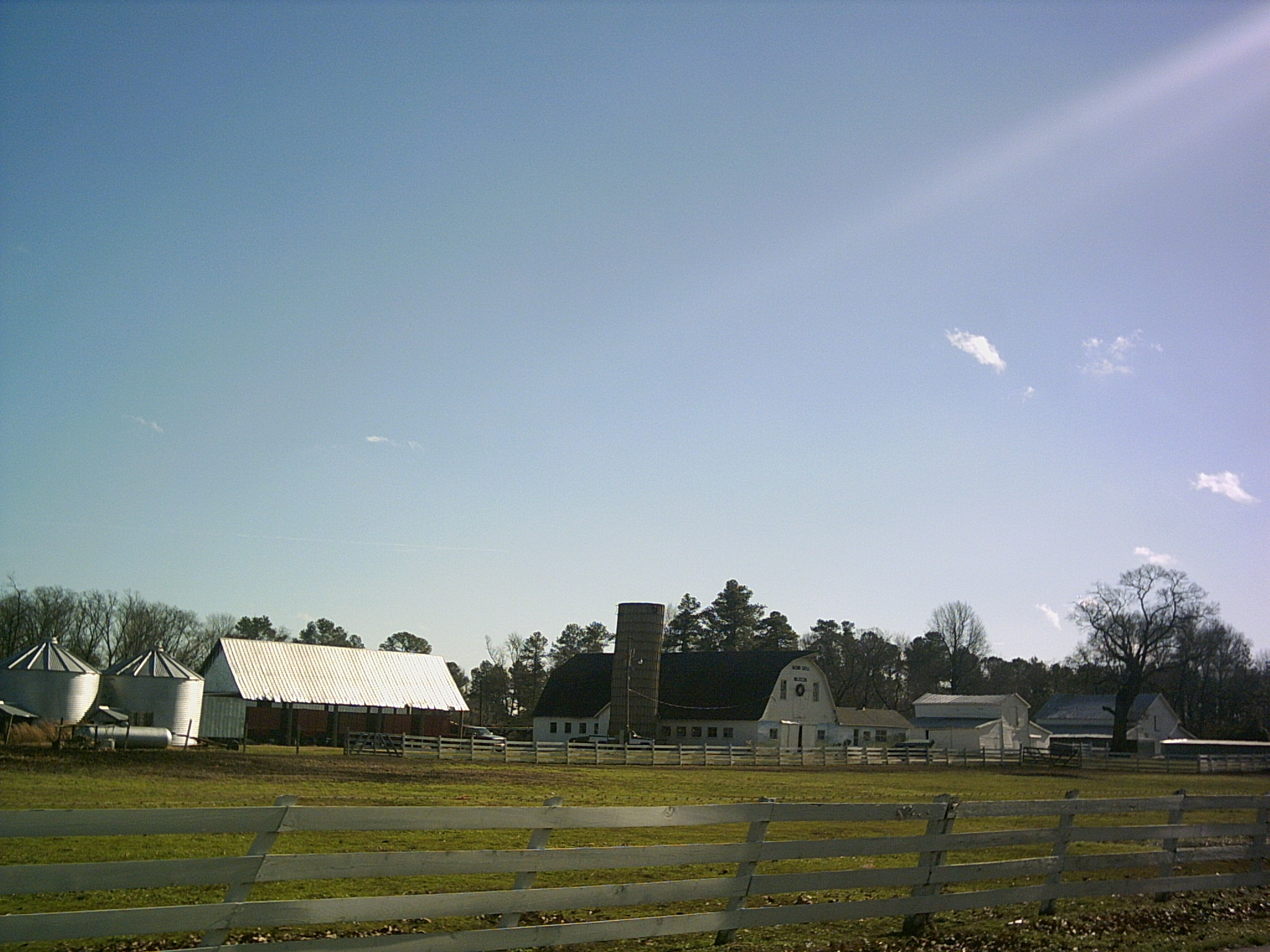
Farm in Surry County

According to the U.S. Census Bureau, the county has a total area of 310 square miles (800 km^{2}), of which 279 square miles (720 km^{2}) is land and 31 square miles (80 km^{2}) (10.1%) is water.

=== Adjacent counties ===
- Charles City County (northwest)
- Isle of Wight County (southeast)
- James City County (northeast)
- Prince George County (west)
- Southampton County (south)
- Sussex County (southwest)

== Education ==
Education in Surry County is run by Surry County Public Schools. It currently has three schools (Surry Elementary, Luther P. Jackson Middle, and Surry County High School), all located in Dendron.

== Demographics ==
Historical population
Census	Pop.	Note	%±
1790	6,227		—
1800	6,535		4.9%
1810	6,855		4.9%
1820	6,594		−3.8%
1830	7,109		7.8%
1840	6,480		−8.8%
1850	5,679		−12.4%
1860	6,133		8.0%
1870	5,585		−8.9%
1880	7,391		32.3%
1890	8,256		11.7%
1900	8,469		2.6%
1910	9,715		14.7%
1920	9,305		−4.2%
1930	7,096		−23.7%
1940	6,193		−12.7%
1950	6,220		0.4%
1960	6,220		0.0%
1970	5,882		−5.4%
1980	6,046		2.8%
1990	6,145		1.6%
2000	6,829		11.1%
2010	7,058		3.4%
2020	6,561		−7.0%
2025 (est.)	6,603	▲	0.6%
U.S. Decennial Census; 1790-1960 1900-1990; 1990-2000 2010-2020

=== Racial and ethnic composition ===
Surry County, Virginia – Racial and ethnic composition Note: the US Census treats Hispanic/Latino as an ethnic category. This table excludes Latinos from the racial categories and assigns them to a separate category. Hispanics/Latinos may be of any race.
Race / Ethnicity (NH = Non-Hispanic)	Pop 1980	Pop 1990	Pop 2000	Pop 2010	Pop 2020	% 1980	% 1990	% 2000	% 2010	% 2020
White alone (NH)	2,262	2,704	3,170	3,583	3,459	37.41%	44.00%	46.42%	50.77%	52.72%
Black or African American alone (NH)	3,668	3,410	3,513	3,240	2,687	60.67%	55.49%	51.44%	45.91%	40.95%
Native American or Alaska Native alone (NH)	1	10	16	21	17	0.02%	0.16%	0.23%	0.30%	0.26%
Asian alone (NH)	1	2	9	23	14	0.02%	0.03%	0.13%	0.33%	0.21%
Native Hawaiian or Pacific Islander alone (NH)	x	x	2	2	10	x	x	0.03%	0.03%	0.15%
Other race alone (NH)	1	0	9	4	15	0.02%	0.00%	0.13%	0.06%	0.23%
Mixed race or Multiracial (NH)	x	x	59	99	210	x	x	0.86%	1.40%	3.20%
Hispanic or Latino (any race)	113	19	51	86	149	1.87%	0.31%	0.75%	1.22%	2.27%
Total	6,046	6,145	6,829	7,058	6,561	100.00%	100.00%	100.00%	100.00%	100.00%

=== 2020 census ===
As of the 2020 census, the county had a population of 6,561. The median age was 51.5 years. 17.3% of residents were under the age of 18 and 23.9% of residents were 65 years of age or older. For every 100 females there were 95.6 males, and for every 100 females age 18 and over there were 94.2 males age 18 and over.

The racial makeup of the county was 53.1% White, 41.1% Black or African American, 0.3% American Indian and Alaska Native, 0.2% Asian, 0.2% Native Hawaiian and Pacific Islander, 0.8% from some other race, and 4.4% from two or more races. Hispanic or Latino residents of any race comprised 2.3% of the population.

0.0% of residents lived in urban areas, while 100.0% lived in rural areas.

There were 2,787 households in the county, of which 23.7% had children under the age of 18 living with them and 25.7% had a female householder with no spouse or partner present. About 27.1% of all households were made up of individuals and 12.8% had someone living alone who was 65 years of age or older.

There were 3,402 housing units, of which 18.1% were vacant. Among occupied housing units, 79.0% were owner-occupied and 21.0% were renter-occupied. The homeowner vacancy rate was 2.4% and the rental vacancy rate was 9.3%.

=== 2010 Census ===
As of the census of 2010, there were 7,058 people, 2,619 households, and 1,917 families residing in the county. The population density was 24 people per square mile (9.3 people/km^{2}). There were 3,294 housing units at an average density of 12 units per square mile (4.6 units/km^{2}). The racial makeup of the county was 51.3% White, 46.1% Black or African American, 0.3% Native American, 0.3% Asian, 0.0% Pacific Islander, 0.3% from other races, and 1.7% from two or more races. 1.2% of the population were Hispanic or Latino of any race.

There were 2,619 households, out of which 30.50% had children under the age of 18 living with them, 55.50% were married couples living together, 14.10% had a female householder with no husband present, and 26.80% were non-families. 23.70% of all households were made up of individuals, and 10.10% had someone living alone who was 65 years of age or older. The average household size was 2.61 and the average family size was 3.09.

In the county, the age distribution of the population shows 25.20% under the age of 18, 7.20% from 18 to 24, 27.80% from 25 to 44, 25.70% from 45 to 64, and 14.10% who were 65 years of age or older. The median age was 39 years. For every 100 females, there were 93.70 males. For every 100 females aged 18 and over, there were 92.00 males.

The median income for a household in the county was $37,558, and the median income for a family was $41,234. Males had a median income of $31,123 versus $21,143 for females. The per capita income for the county was $16,682. About 9.70% of families and 10.80% of the population were below the poverty line, including 13.40% of those under age 18 and 14.80% of those age 65 or over.

== Public services ==
Blackwater Regional Library is the regional library system that provides services to the citizens of Surry.

== Communities ==
=== Towns ===
- Claremont
- Dendron
- Surry

=== Census-designated place ===
- Scotland

=== Other unincorporated communities ===
- Bacon's Castle
- Cabin Point
- Carsley
- Elberon
- Spring Grove

== Politics ==
Surry County had long been a stronghold for the Democratic Party, however, it has been shifting toward the Republican Party. Republican Donald Trump won the county in the 2024 presidential election, flipping it. He became the first Republican to do so in a presidential election since Richard Nixon in 1972.

United States presidential election results for Surry County, Virginia
Year	Republican		Democratic		Third party(ies)	
Year	No.	%	No.	%	No.	%
1912	57	12.26%	360	77.42%	48	10.32%
1916	90	17.08%	430	81.59%	7	1.33%
1920	92	18.70%	397	80.69%	3	0.61%
1924	72	14.34%	388	77.29%	42	8.37%
1928	157	22.49%	541	77.51%	0	0.00%
1932	73	9.92%	653	88.72%	10	1.36%
1936	87	10.82%	715	88.93%	2	0.25%
1940	120	15.42%	658	84.58%	0	0.00%
1944	123	16.94%	602	82.92%	1	0.14%
1948	134	17.31%	460	59.43%	180	23.26%
1952	414	41.15%	572	56.86%	20	1.99%
1956	425	32.52%	616	47.13%	266	20.35%
1960	397	27.51%	1,003	69.51%	43	2.98%
1964	1,004	46.92%	1,131	52.85%	5	0.23%
1968	523	22.10%	1,126	47.59%	717	30.30%
1972	1,067	50.40%	988	46.67%	62	2.93%
1976	929	32.79%	1,829	64.56%	75	2.65%
1980	962	34.10%	1,756	62.25%	103	3.65%
1984	1,462	43.38%	1,875	55.64%	33	0.98%
1988	1,246	42.98%	1,602	55.26%	51	1.76%
1992	1,046	31.94%	1,823	55.66%	406	12.40%
1996	944	32.13%	1,753	59.67%	241	8.20%
2000	1,313	40.65%	1,845	57.12%	72	2.23%
2004	1,543	43.81%	1,954	55.48%	25	0.71%
2008	1,663	38.45%	2,626	60.72%	36	0.83%
2012	1,671	38.79%	2,576	59.80%	61	1.42%
2016	1,819	43.02%	2,272	53.74%	137	3.24%
2020	2,025	45.29%	2,397	53.61%	49	1.10%
2024	2,205	49.65%	2,176	49.00%	60	1.35%

== Notable incidents in Surry County ==
=== Dog fighting investigation ===
Beginning on April 25, 2007, Surry County Sheriff Harold D. Brown and part-time county Commonwealth's Attorney (prosecutor) Gerald G. Poindexter led a high-profile dog fighting investigation. Authorities investigating Davon T. Boddie, 26, on a narcotics issue found evidence of dogfighting activities at home and property in Surry County where he lived. It was owned by his cousin, then Atlanta Falcons NFL-football player Michael Vick. Officials confiscated 66 dogs, 55 of which were pit bulls, and other evidence. An ESPN source alleged that Vick was a "heavyweight" in dogfighting and had been known to wager $40,000 on the outcome of a single fight.

By August 20, 2007, all the defendants charged in Federal court, including Vick, had agreed to guilty pleas under plea bargain agreements. They were sentenced to terms ranging from 6 to 23 months, to be served in federal prisons. The abused dogs were placed in foster or adoptive homes.

On February 26, 2009, Vick was approved for release to home confinement. He was released on May 21, 2009, to be confined for the remainder of his 23-month term of imprisonment under home confinement.

== Points of interest ==
- Bacon's Castle
- Chippokes Plantation State Park
- Jamestown-Scotland Ferry
- National Register of Historic Places listings in Surry County, Virginia
- Surry County Courthouse Complex
- Surry Nuclear Power Plant

== Notable people ==
- Leslie Garland Bolling (1898–1955), Early 20th century black American woodcarver
- Robert Butler (1784–1853), European-American politician and physician; served as Adjutant General of Virginia and State Treasurer of Virginia
- John Hartwell Cocke (1780–1866), European-American military officer, planter, and businessman
- Joseph T. Deal (1860–1942), Virginia politician and businessman
- Curtis W. Harris (1924–2017), minister, civil rights activist, and politician in Virginia
- Thomas Person (1733–1800), European-American politician and Anti-Federalist organizer
- Peyton Short (1761–1825), land speculator and politician in Kentucky
- Claude V. Spratley (1882–1976), Virginia jurist
- Karen Huger, Real Housewives of Potomac personality.
