= Surry, Virginia =

- Town
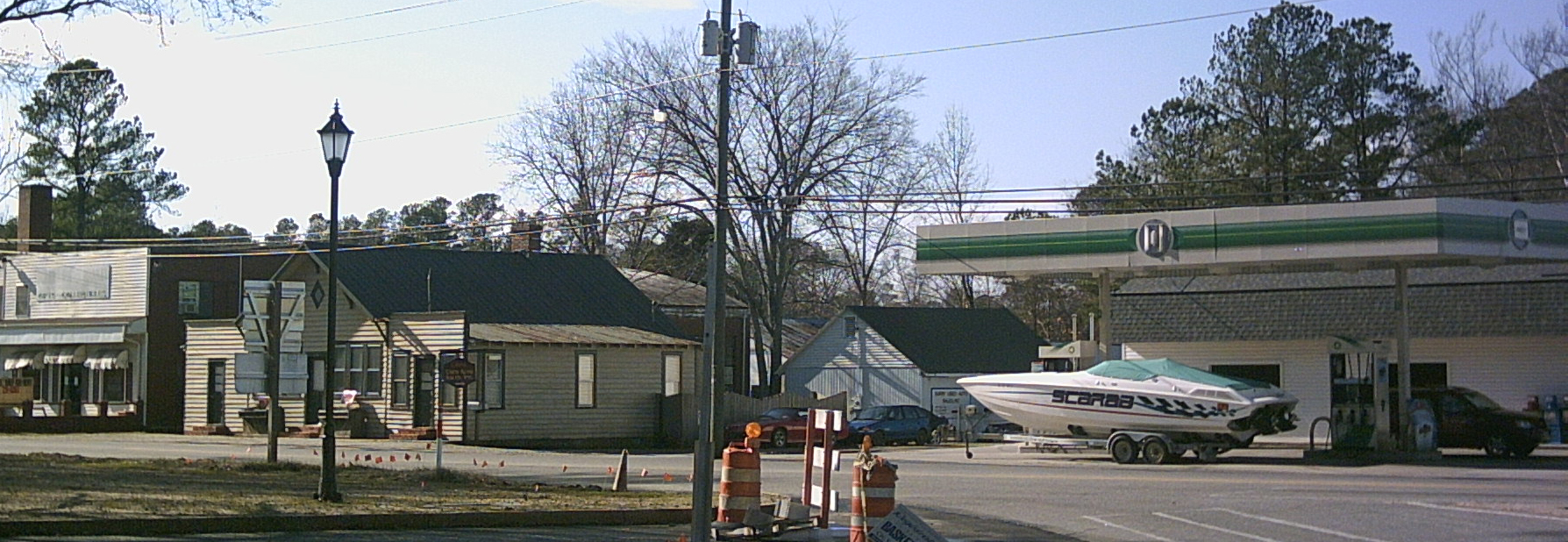
- Shops and a gas station in downtown Surry

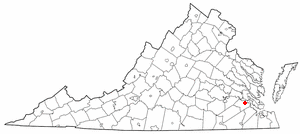
- Location of Surry, Virginia
- Coordinates: 37°8′9″N 76°50′7″W
- Country: United States
- State: Virginia
- County: Surry
- Surry: 1652

Area
  - Total: 0.83 sq mi (2.14 km^{2})
  - Land: 0.83 sq mi (2.14 km^{2})
  - Water: 0 sq mi (0.00 km^{2})
- Elevation: 121 ft (37 m)

Population (2020)
  - Total: 208
  - Estimate (2019): 218
  - Density: 263.6/sq mi (101.79/km^{2})
- Time zone: UTC-5 (Eastern (EST))
  - Summer (DST): UTC-4 (EDT)
- ZIP code: 23883
- Area codes: 757, 948
- FIPS code: 51-76880
- GNIS feature ID: 1500197
- Website: https://surryva.town/

Surry (formerly Cross Roads, McIntosh's Cross Roads, McIntoshs Cross Roads, Scuffletown, Smithville, Surry Court House, and The Crossroads) is an incorporated town in Surry County, Virginia, United States. As of the 2020 census, Surry had a population of 208. It is the county seat of Surry County. Its name is derived from the county of Surrey in England.

Local Event Center “Farm House” <2026 October> Jazz Nights

== Geography ==
According to the United States Census Bureau, the town has a total area of 0.8 square mile (2.1 km^{2}), all land.

== Demographics ==
Historical population
Census	Pop.	Note	%±
1930	243		—
1940	254		4.5%
1950	248		−2.4%
1960	288		16.1%
1970	269		−6.6%
1980	237		−11.9%
1990	192		−19.0%
2000	262		36.5%
2010	244		−6.9%
2020	208		−14.8%
U.S. Decennial Census

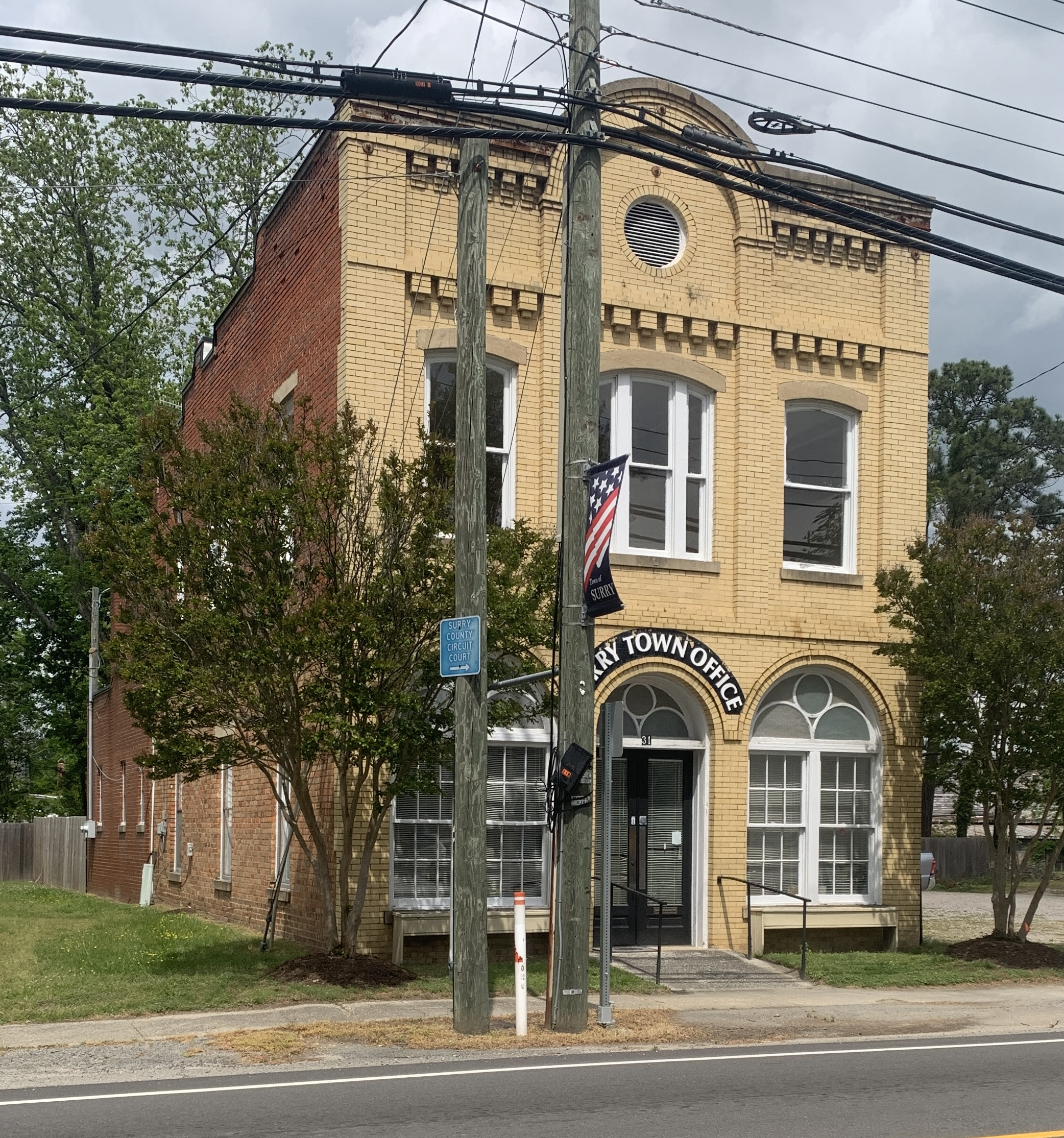
Town Hall

As of the census of 2000, there were 262 people, 109 households, and 80 families living in the town. The population density was 323.7 people per square mile (124.9/km^{2}). There were 119 housing units at an average density of 147.0 per square mile (56.7/km^{2}). The racial makeup of the town was 74.05% White, 23.28% African American, 1.15% Native American, 1.53% from other races. Hispanic or Latino of any race were 0.76% of the population.

There were 109 households, out of which 30.3% had children under the age of 18 living with them, 53.2% were married couples living together, 11.9% had a female householder with no husband present, and 26.6% were non-families. 24.8% of all households were made up of individuals, and 8.3% had someone living alone who was 65 years of age or older. The average household size was 2.40 and the average family size was 2.83.

In the town, the population was spread out, with 21.8% under the age of 18, 8.4% from 18 to 24, 33.2% from 25 to 44, 21.4% from 45 to 64, and 15.3% who were 65 years of age or older. The median age was 39 years. For every 100 females there were 98.5 males. For every 100 females aged 18 and over, there were 97.1 males.

The median income for a household in the town was $42,361, and the median income for a family was $51,071. Males had a median income of $30,000 versus $22,500 for females. The per capita income for the town was $21,606. About 10.8% of families and 10.7% of the population were below the poverty line, including 13.3% of those under the age of eighteen and 5.0% of those 65 or over.

== Education ==
Public education is offered by the Surry County Public Schools.
