= Statue of Liberty (Washington, D.C.) =

Replica statue in Washington, D.C., U.S.

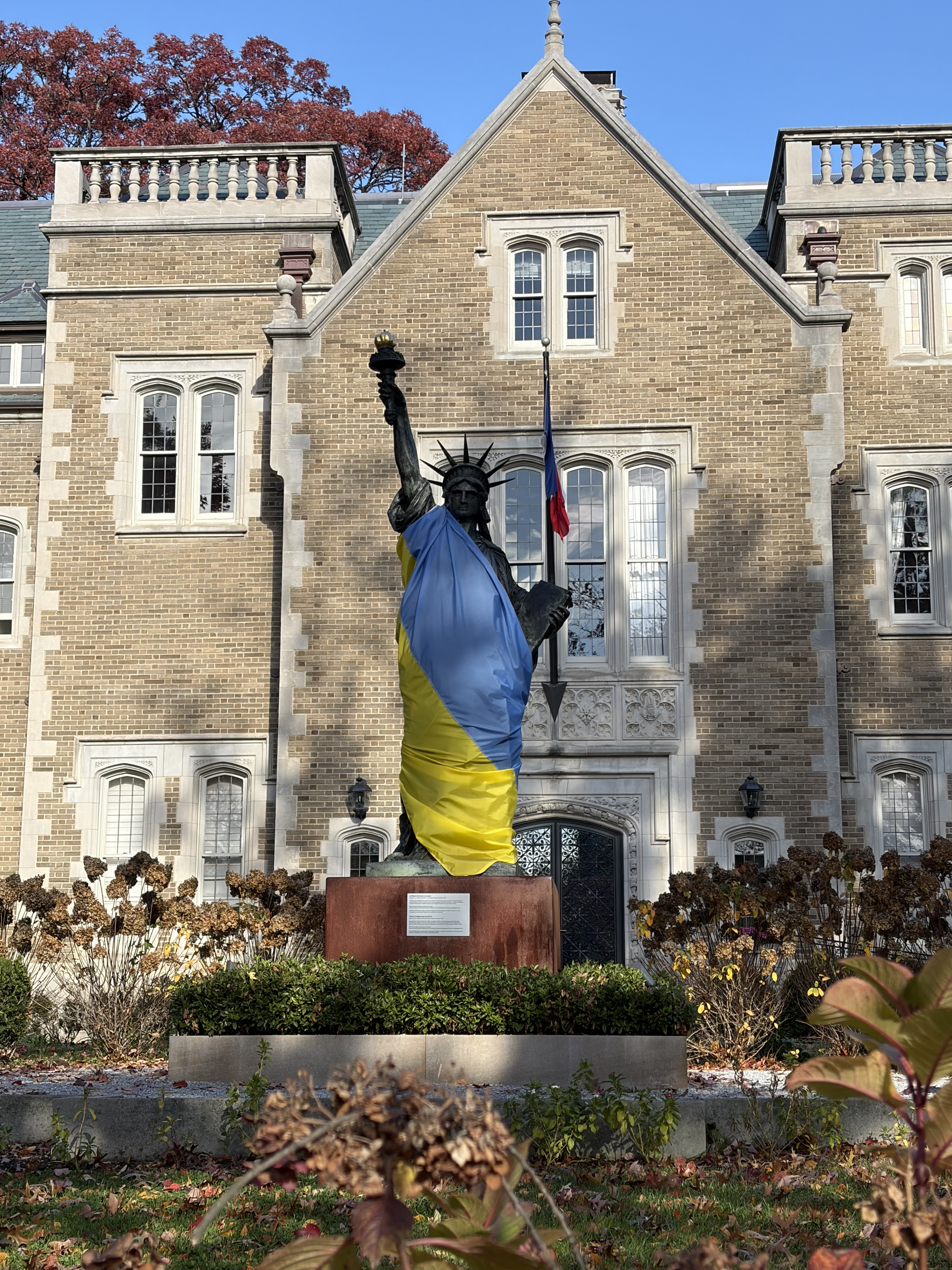
- The replica statue, draped in a Ukrainian flag and photographed in 2025
- Year: 2021
- Medium: Bronze sculpture
- Location: Washington D.C., U.S.; 38°55′4.8″N 77°3′2.2″W

A ten-foot bronze replica of the Statue of Liberty (Liberty Enlightening the World) is installed at the French ambassador's residence in Washington, D.C. Installed in 2021, the statue is a one-sixteenth replica of the original and was crafted from Auguste Bartholdi’s 1878 plaster model. The statue will remain in the U.S. for ten years, after which it will return to the Musée des Arts et Métiers (Museum of Arts and Crafts) in Paris.

== See also ==
- Replicas of the Statue of Liberty
