= Replicas of the Statue of Liberty =

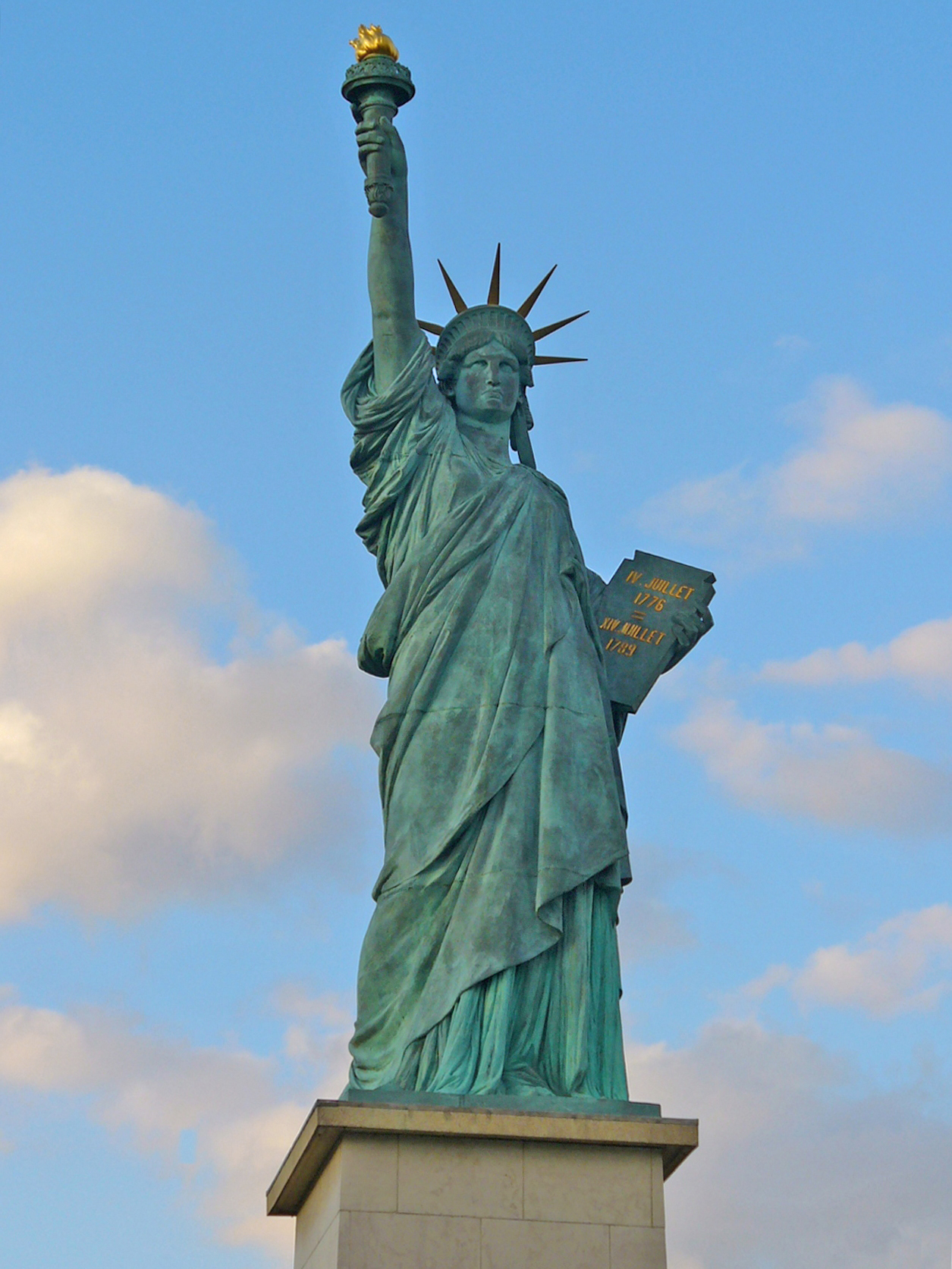
The Statue of Liberty replica on the Île aux Cygnes, Seine River in Paris, was given to the city in 1889.

Hundreds of replicas of New York City's Statue of Liberty (Liberty Enlightening the World) have been created worldwide. The original Statue of Liberty, designed by sculptor Frédéric Auguste Bartholdi, is 151 feet tall and stands on a pedestal that is 154 feet tall, making the height of the entire sculpture 305 feet. The design for the original Statue of Liberty began in 1865, with final installation in 1886.

== Europe ==
=== France ===
==== Paris ====
===== Musée d'Orsay =====
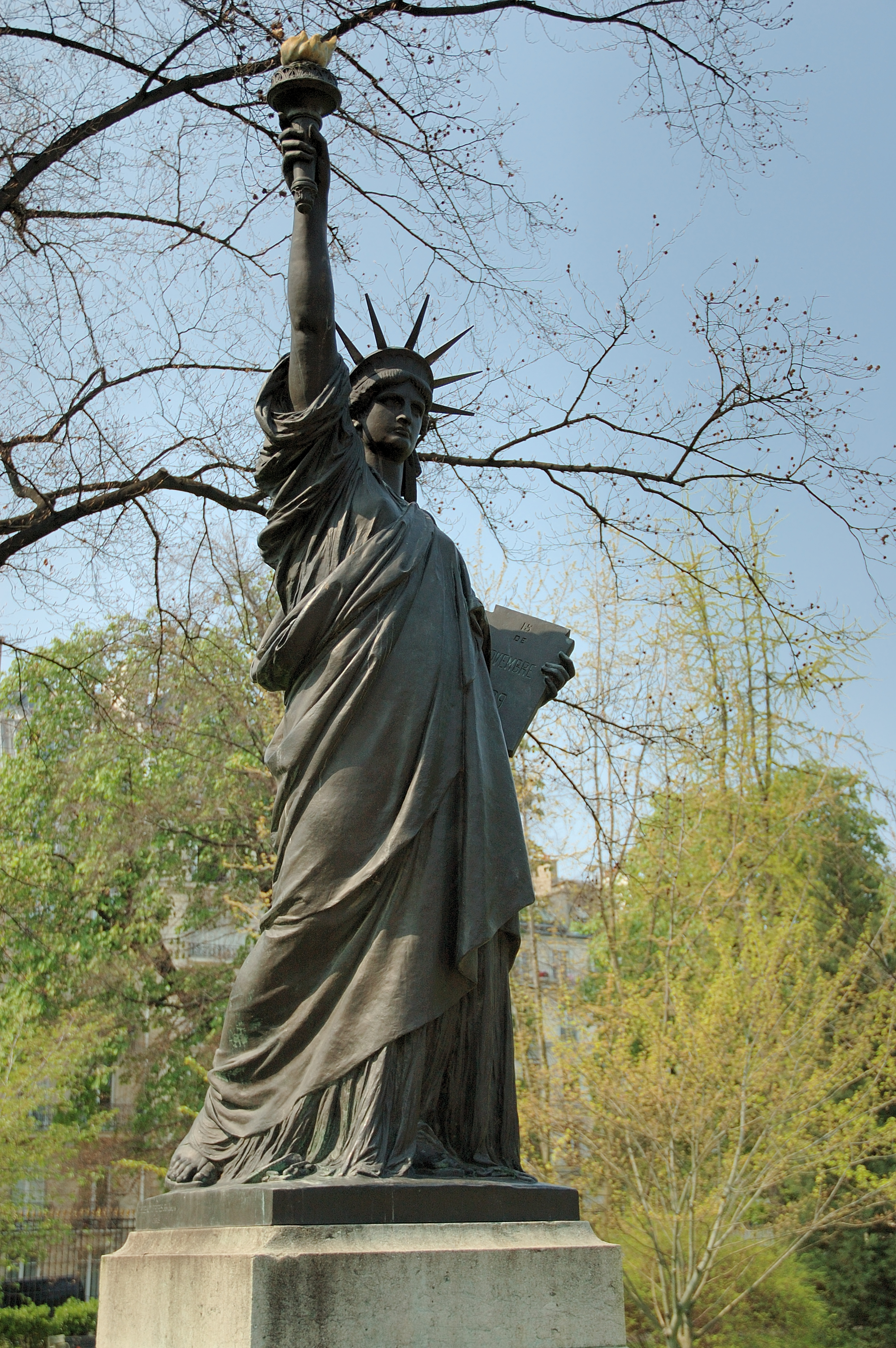
The Exposition Universelle model in its previous location in the Jardin du Luxembourg, Paris

On the occasion of the Exposition Universelle of 1900, sculptor Frédéric Bartholdi crafted a 1/16 scale, 2.74-metre (9.0-foot) version of his Liberty Enlightening the World. It was cast in 1889 and he subsequently gave it to the Musée du Luxembourg. In 1906, the statue was placed outside the museum in the Jardin du Luxembourg, where it stood for over a century, until 2011. Since 2012 it has stood within the entrance hall to the Musée d'Orsay, and a newly constructed bronze replica stands in its place in the Jardin du Luxembourg.

===== Île aux Cygnes =====
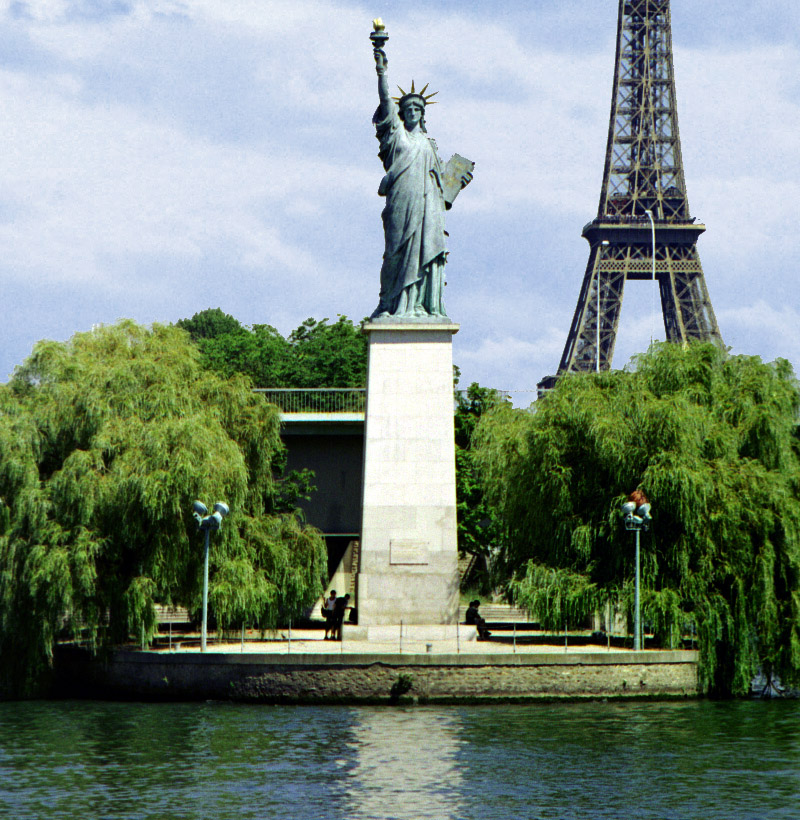
The Île aux Cygnes replica of Liberty Enlightening the World was given to France by Parisian expatriates in the United States to celebrate the centennial of the French Revolution.

This statue was given in 1889 to Paris by Parisian expatriates in the United States, only three years after the main statue in New York was inaugurated, to celebrate the centennial of the French Revolution. Originally, the statue was turned towards the east in order to face the Eiffel Tower. In 1937, it was turned towards the west so that it would be facing the original statue in New York. It is one of three replicas in Paris.

The statue is near the Pont de Grenelle on the Île aux Cygnes, a man-made island in the Seine (48°51′0″N 2°16′47″E). It is a quarter-scale version (11.50 metres (37 feet 9 inches) high), and was one of the working models used during construction of the actual Statue of Liberty. The statue is a short distance away from the Eiffel Tower and Alexandre-Gustave Eiffel designed its supporting structure. This model weighs 14 tons. It was inaugurated on 4 July 1889. Its tablet bears two dates: "IV JUILLET 1776" (4 July 1776: the United States Declaration of Independence) like the New York statue, and "XIV JUILLET 1789" (14 July 1789: the storming of the Bastille) associated with an equal sign. This statue is shown in the 2007 film National Treasure: Book of Secrets as a historic location.

===== Musée des Arts et Métiers =====
The 2.86-metre (9.4 ft) tall original plaster maquette finished in 1878 by Auguste Bartholdi that was used to make the statue in New York is in the Musée des Arts et Métiers in Paris. This original plaster model was bequeathed by the artist's widow in 1907, together with part of the artist's estate.

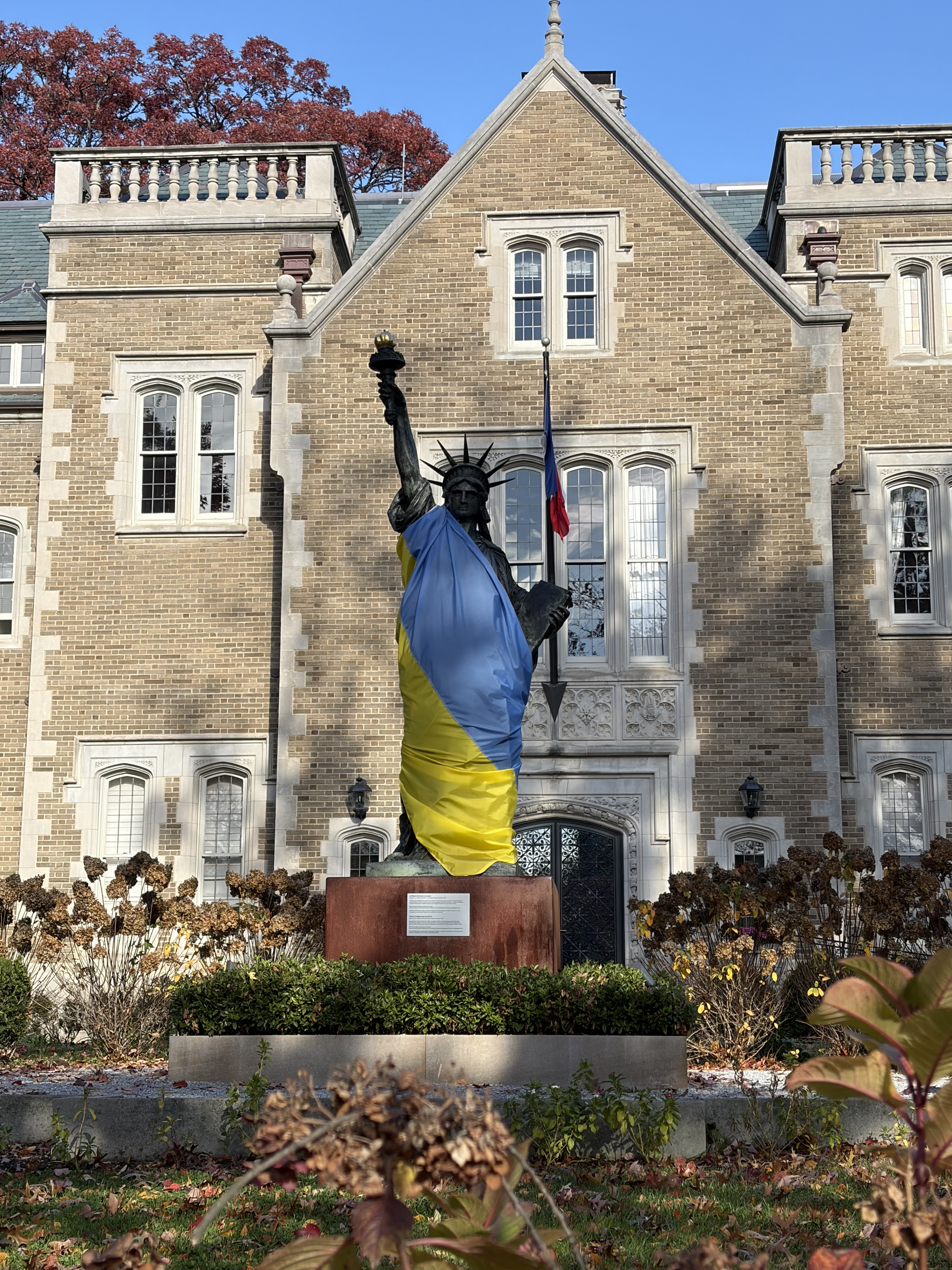
The Musée des Arts et Métiers bronze replica, on display in 2025 at the French ambassador's residence in Washington, D.C..

On the square outside the Musée des Arts et Métiers's entrance was a bronze copy made from the plaster maquette, number 1 from an original edition of 12, made by the museum and cast by Susse Fondeur Paris. It was this replica that was shipped to the U.S. under a joint effort by the Embassy of France in the United States, the Conservatoire national des arts et métiers and the shipping company CMA CGM Group. After spending time on Ellis Island for Independence Day 2021, it now resides at the French ambassador's residence in Washington, D.C.

===== Flame of Liberty =====
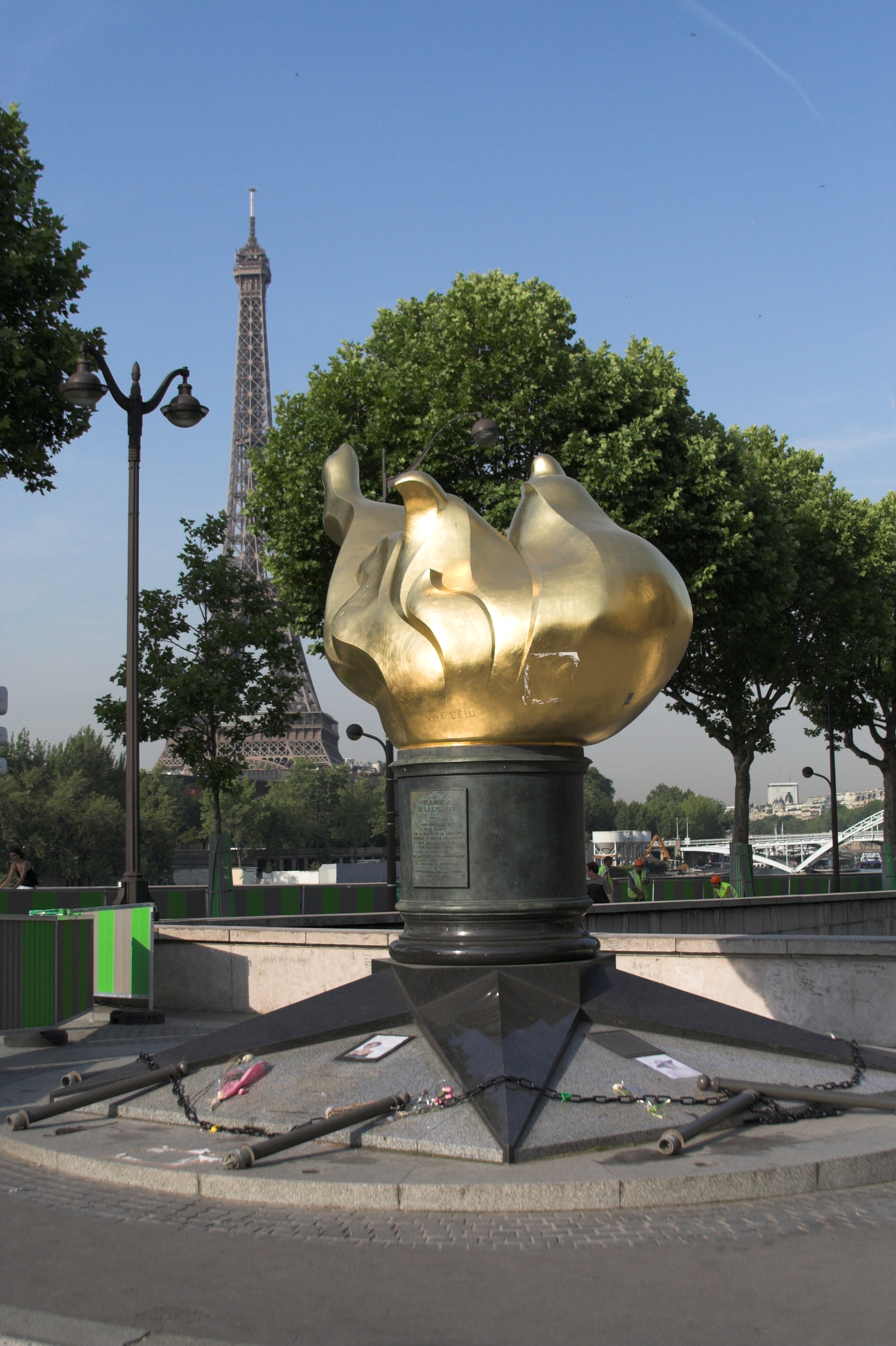
The Flame of Liberty, Paris

A life-size copy of the torch, Flame of Liberty, can be seen above the entrance to the Pont de l'Alma tunnel near the Champs-Élysées in Paris. It was given to the city as a return gift in honour of the centennial celebration of the statue's dedication. In 1997, the torch became an unofficial memorial to Diana, Princess of Wales after she was killed in a car accident in the Pont de l'Alma tunnel.

==== Barentin ====
There is a 13.5-metre (44 ft) polyester replica in the northwest of France, in the small town of Barentin near Rouen. It was made for the 1969 French film, Le Cerveau ("The Brain"), directed by Gérard Oury and featuring actors Jean-Paul Belmondo and Bourvil.

==== Bordeaux ====
There is a 2.5-metre (8.2 ft) replica of the statue in the city of Bordeaux. The first Bordeaux statue was seized and melted down by the Nazis in World War II. The statue was replaced in 2000 and a plaque was added to commemorate the victims of the 11 September terrorist attacks. On the night of 25 March 2003, unknown vandals poured red paint and gasoline on the replica and set it on fire. The vandals also cracked the pedestal of the plaque. The mayor of Bordeaux, former prime minister Alain Juppé, condemned the attack.

==== Colmar ====
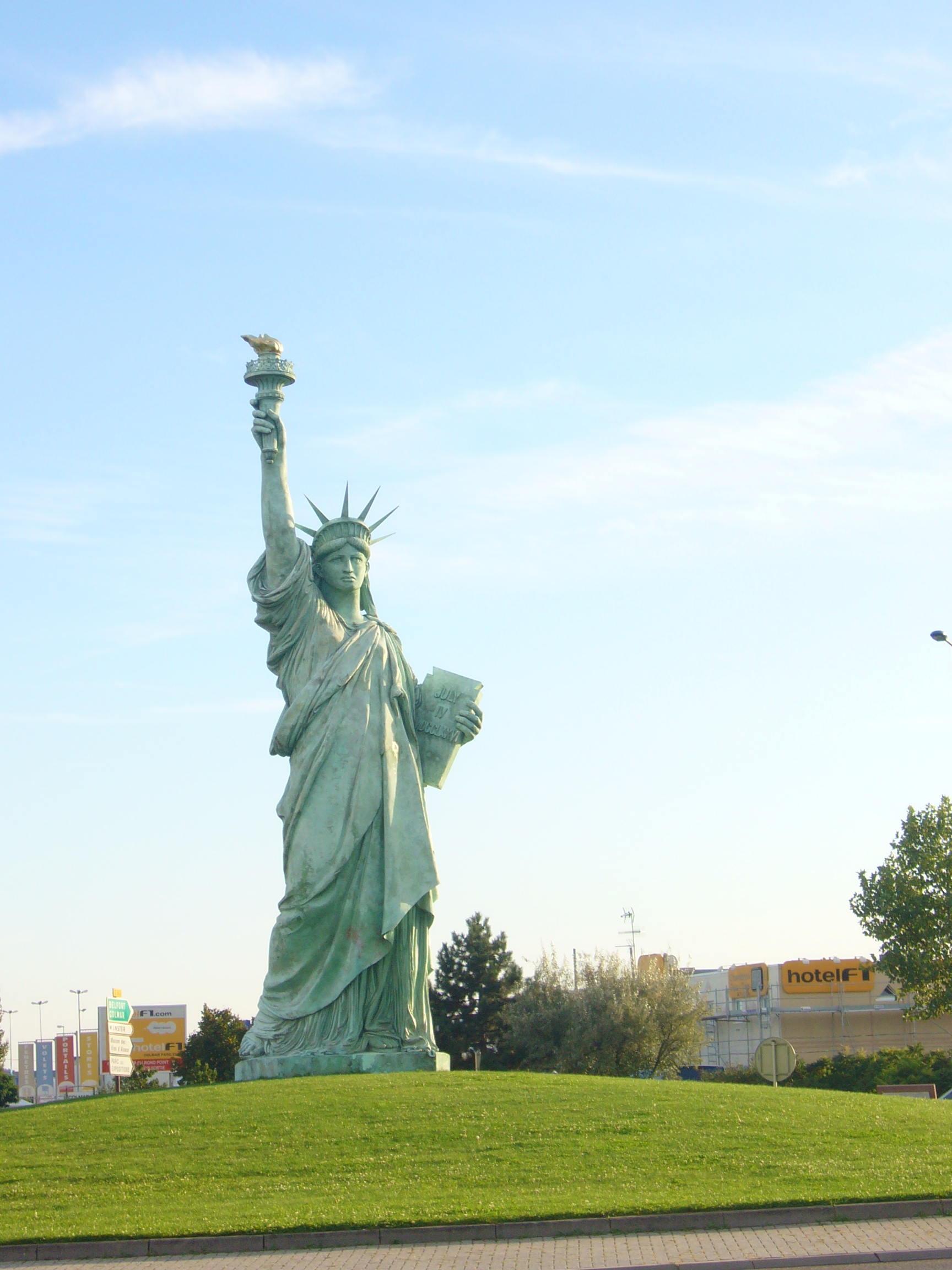
Replica of the Statue of Liberty in Colmar

A 12-metre (39 ft 4 in) replica of the Statue of Liberty in Colmar, the city of Bartholdi's birth, was dedicated on 4 July 2004, to commemorate the 100th anniversary of his death. It stands at the north entrance of the city. The Bartholdi Museum in Colmar contains numerous models of various sizes made by Bartholdi during the process of designing the statue.

==== Saint-Cyr-sur-Mer ====
Frédéric Bartholdi donated a copy of the Statue of Liberty to the town square of Saint-Cyr-sur-Mer.

==== Other French cities ====
The replica on the Place de la Liberté in Poitiers

Other Liberty Enlightening the World statues are displayed in Poitiers and Lunel. The Musée des beaux-arts de Lyon owns a terracotta version.

Near Chaumont, Haute Marne, is a miniature replica in the flag plaza of the former Chaumont Air Base. This was the home of the US 48th Tactical Fighter Wing, now based at Lakenheath, England, with its own statue at the flag plaza. The 48th TFW is the only USAF wing with a name: "The Statue of Liberty Wing".

Another example is of a Liberty Enlightening the World replica in Châteauneuf-la-Forêt, near the city of Limoges in the area of Haute-Vienne, Limousin. There is another "original" Bartholdi replica at Roybon (near Grenoble)

There is a small replica on Promenade des Anglais in Nice. This is one of Bartholdi's first models and overlooks the Mediterranean Sea on the Quai des Etats-Unis (the promenade of the United States).

=== Spain ===
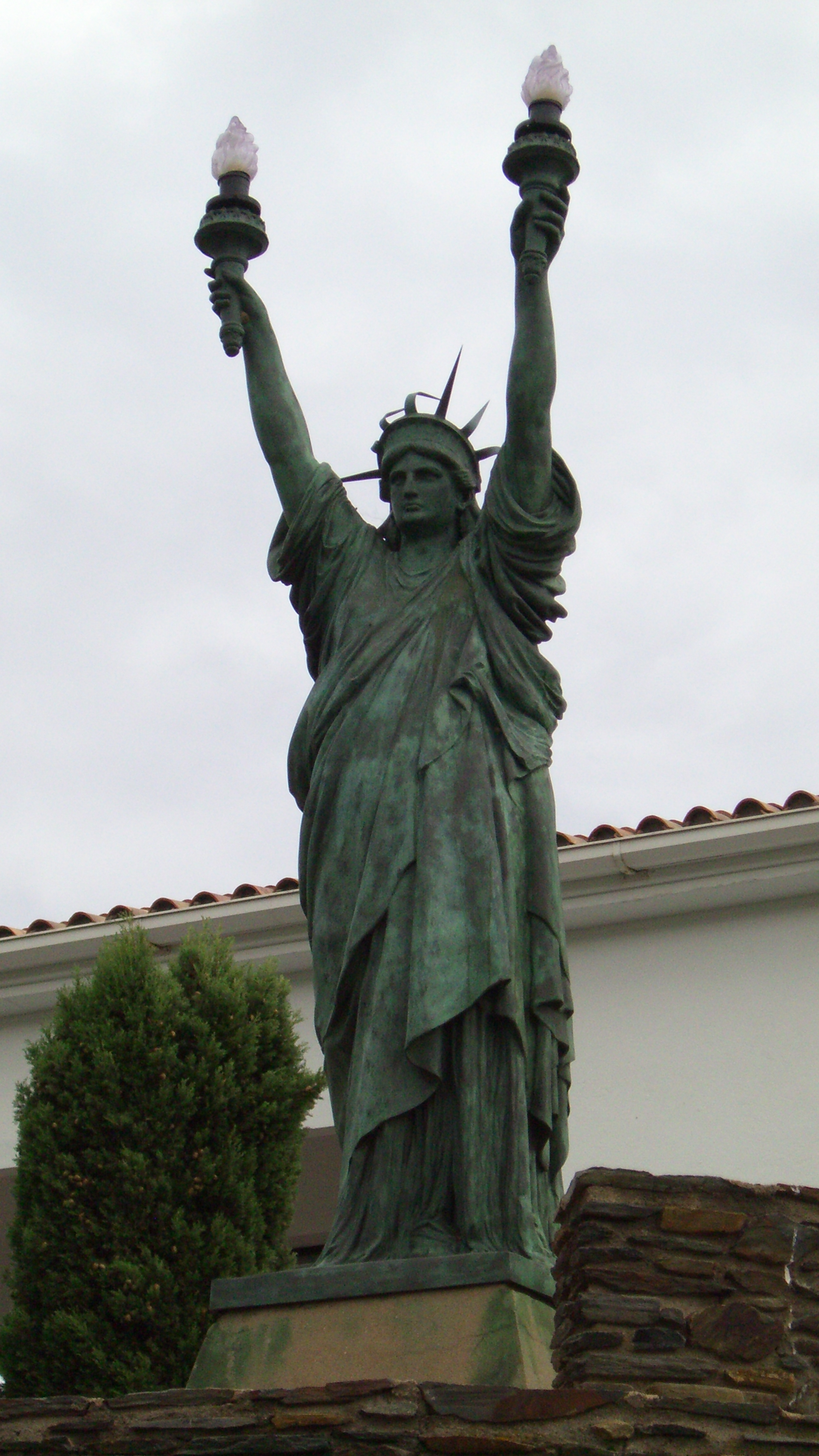
Reimagined replica of the Statue of Liberty in Cadaqués, Spain

==== Barcelona ====
The Rossend Arús public library in Barcelona has in its entrance a 2-metre (6 ft 7 in) replica from 1894. She welcomes visitors to the library, which is devoted to the labour movement, anarchism, and freemasonry.

==== Cadaqués ====
Cadaqués, a small village that was residence of Salvador Dalí, has an unusual version, with both arms and hands up holding torches. It is on top of a small tourism information office.

==== Cenicero ====
In 1897 a 123-centimetre (4 ft 0 in) replica in iron and bronze was erected in Cenicero, Spain, to honor local fighters during the First Carlist War. In 1936 it was removed during the dictatorship of Francisco Franco. It was restored in 1976.

=== Austria ===
In Minimundus, a miniature park located at the Wörthersee in Carinthia, Austria, is another replica of the Statue of Liberty.

In Graz, standing between the Opera House and the NextLiberty Theater, stands a steel structure built out of steel beams, that depict the original size of the statue of liberty, before the plates of the final form were being put into place. Instead of torch of flame, this depiction is holding a sword in extended left arm and a sphere in the right arm representing the world.

=== Denmark ===
A small replica in lego is situated in the original Legoland in Billund. The replica is made from 400,000 Lego bricks and also resides in other Lego theme parks.

=== Germany ===
A 35-metre (115 ft) copy is in the German Heide Park Soltau theme park, located on a lake with cruising Mississippi steamboats. It weighs 28 metric tons (31 short tons), is made of plastic foam on a steel frame with polyester cladding, and was designed by the Dutch artist Gerla Spee.

=== Ireland ===
A green painted replica of the Statue of Liberty can be found near Mulnamina More, County Donegal, Ireland.

=== Kosovo ===
A replica stands atop the Hotel Victory in Pristina, Kosovo. Today the hotel is closed and the police from Kosovo use the building.

=== Netherlands ===
A 33-foot (10 m) replica has its temporary location in the Dutch city of Assen. The statue bears characteristic features that represent the culture and landscape of the region, like a can of beans instead of the original torch. The replica, by sculptor Natasja Bennink, was on display for the duration of an exhibition on American realism in the Drents Museum until 27 May 2018.

=== Norway ===
A smaller replica is in the Norwegian village of Visnes, where the copper used in the original statue was mined. A replica is also on the facade of a pub in Bleik, county of Nordland

=== Romania ===
There is a 2.5 m-tall (8.2 ft) statue in Boldeşti-Scăeni, near Prahova County.

=== Ukraine ===
There is a unique "sitting" Statue of Liberty in the Ukrainian city of Lviv. It is a sculpture on a dome of the house (15, Liberty Avenue) built by architect Yuriy Zakharevych and decorated by sculptor Leandro Marconi in 1874–1891.

=== United Kingdom ===
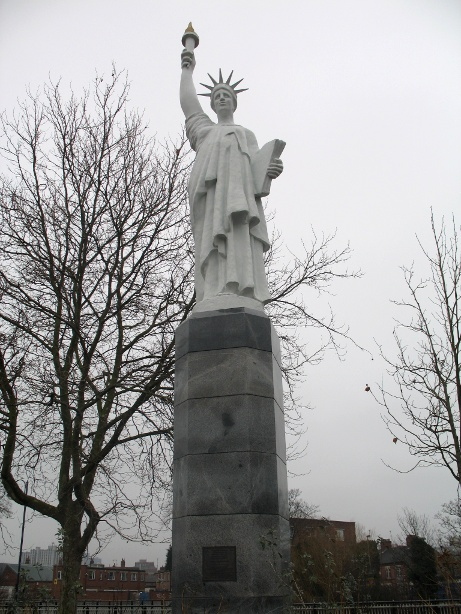
Replica of the Statue of Liberty in Leicester, England

A 17-foot (5.2 m), 9,200-kilogram (9.2-ton) replica stood atop the Liberty Shoe factory in Leicester, England, until 2002 when the building was demolished. The statue was put into storage while the building was replaced. The statue, which dates back to the 1920s, was initially going to be put back on the replacement building, but was too heavy, so in December 2008 following restoration, it was placed on a pedestal near Liberty Park Halls of Residence on a traffic island, "Liberty Circus", close to where it originally stood.

There used to be a 10-foot-high (3.0 m) replica in the stairwell of bowling alley LA Bowl, in Warrington, England. Prior to that it was above the entrance of Liberty Street, a nearby restaurant. It is thought that this is now situated approximately 4 miles away on Mustard Lane in Croft.

There is also a small replica located at RAF Lakenheath, England, at the base flag plaza, made from leftover copper from the original.

== Americas ==
=== Canada ===
In Coquitlam, British Columbia a small replica stood on Delestre Avenue just east of North Road. The statue was removed in 2019 when the hotel behind it was demolished.

=== Mexico ===
- In Campeche, Mexico, there is a small replica in the small town of Palizada.
- In Durango, Mexico, a small replica is in Parque Guadiana. This park also has other small reproductions such as the Eiffel Tower and Taj Mahal.

=== United States ===
- From 1902 to 2002, visitors to midtown Manhattan were occasionally disoriented by what seemed to be an impossibly nearby view of the statue. They were seeing a 30-foot-high (9.1 m) replica located at 43 West 64th Street atop the Liberty Warehouse. In February 2002, the statue was removed by the building's owners to allow the building to be expanded. It was donated to the Brooklyn Museum of Art, which installed it in its sculpture garden in October 2005 with plans to restore it on site in spring of 2006. In 2023, it was donated to the National Building Arts Center
- Replicas of the Statue of Liberty can also be found in Dubuque, Iowa.
- A replica that used to reside at the Musée des Arts et Métiers in Paris was shipped to the U.S. under a joint effort by the Embassy of France in the United States, the Conservatoire national des arts et métiers and the shipping company CMA CGM Group. After spending time on Ellis Island for Independence Day 2021, it now resides at the French ambassador's residence in Washington, D.C. It will remain on display at the residence until 2031.
- A bronze sculpture of the Statue of Liberty is on display in the Metropolitan Museum of Art in New York City. This statue is known as a "committee model." The work was part of an edition of replicas that were sold to help finance the final monument. The sculpture stands at 47 3/4 inches and weights 56.4 pounds.
- Duluth, Minnesota, has a small copy on the south corner of the Duluth Entertainment Convention Center property, in the center of a clearing surrounded by pine trees where it may be passed unnoticed. It was presented to the city by some of Bartholdi's descendants residing in Duluth.
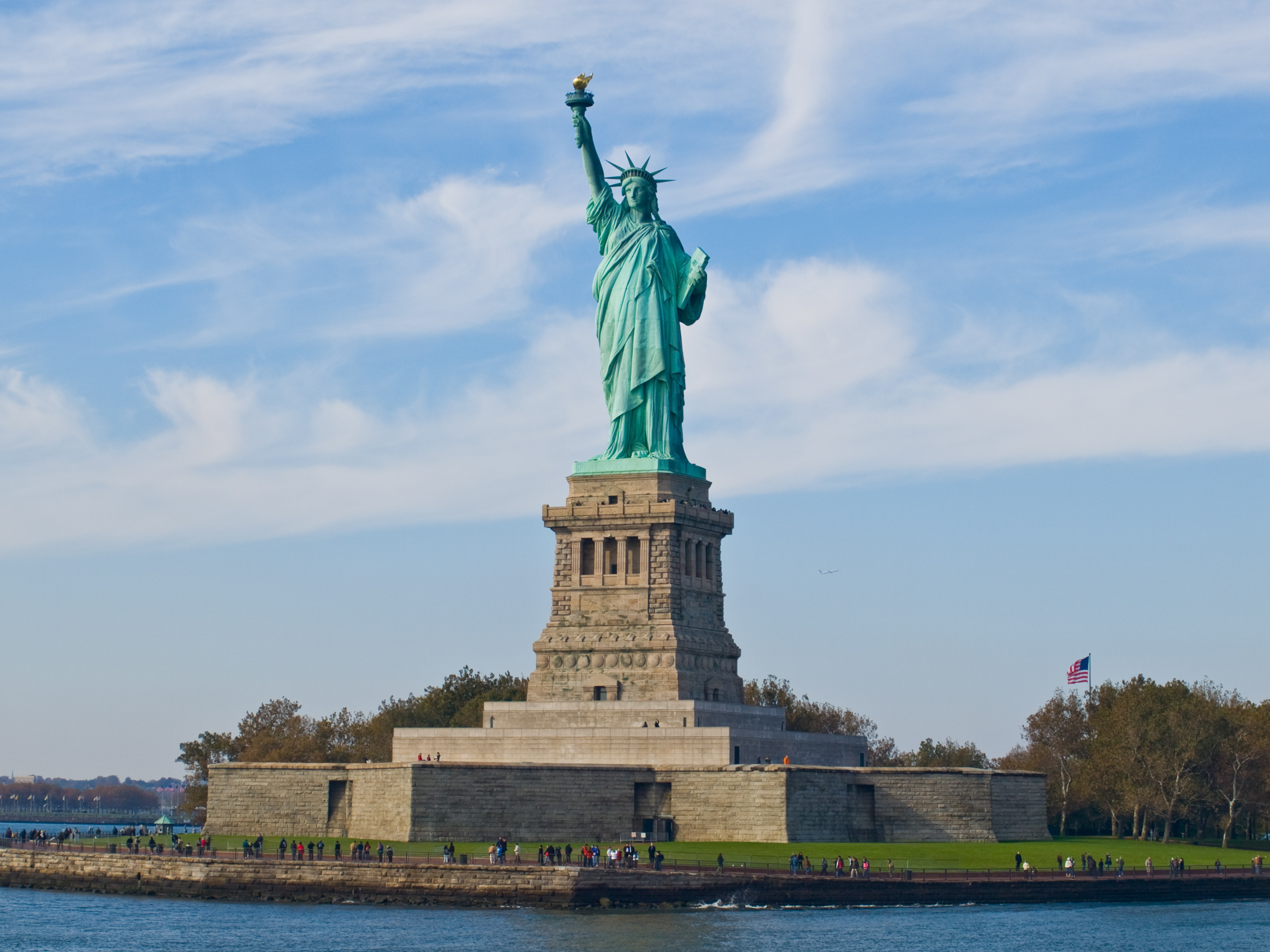
- Statue of Liberty in New York City, and this was purchased by France in the 1880s during the American 100th Birthday of celebration of French Revolution.
  The Boy Scouts of America celebrated their fortieth anniversary in 1950 with the theme of "Strengthen the Arm of Liberty". Between 1949 and 1952, approximately two hundred 100-inch (2.5 m) replicas of the statue, made of stamped copper, were purchased by Boy Scout troops and donated in 39 states in the U.S. and several of its possessions and territories. The project was the brainchild of Kansas City businessman J.P. Whitaker, who was then Scout Commissioner of the Kansas City Area Council. The copper statues were manufactured by Friedley-Voshardt Co. (Chicago, Illinois) and purchased through the Kansas City Boy Scout office by those wanting one. The statues are approximately 8 1/2 feet (2.6 m) tall without the base, are constructed of sheet copper, weigh 290 pounds (130 kg), and originally cost $350 plus freight. The mass-produced statues are not great art nor meticulously accurate (a conservator notes that "her face isn't as mature as the real Liberty. It's rounder and more like a little girl's"), but they are cherished, particularly since 9/11. Many have been lost or destroyed, but preservationists have been able to account for about a hundred of them, and BSA Troop 101 of Cheyenne, Wyoming, has collected photographs of over 100 of them. They are commonly installed at city halls, libraries, and schools. One of these statues was sent to the Philippines. After some years at the mouth of the Pasig River, Manila, it was kept in a store room at the Scout Reservation, Makiling, Laguna, for about two decades. It is now stored at the national office of the Boy Scouts of the Philippines, Manila.
- Three of the Boy Scout Statues are in Wyoming; in Lions Park in Cheyenne, the Carbon County Courthouse in Rawlins, and at the Goshen County District Courthouse in Torrington.
- A nine-foot-tall replica of the Statue, built in 1950, stands in Warner Park in Madison, Wisconsin.
- A replica of the original statue was unveiled on 12 October 2011, at 667 Madison Avenue in Manhattan. Its owner, billionaire Leonard N. Stern, purchased it after reading about it in the local news. The replica is one of only 12 cast from the original mold created by Frédéric Auguste Bartholdi using digital surface scanning and lost-wax casting methods, and is the only one currently on public display. The statue itself is 9 feet tall and 15 feet including the pedestal on which it stands.

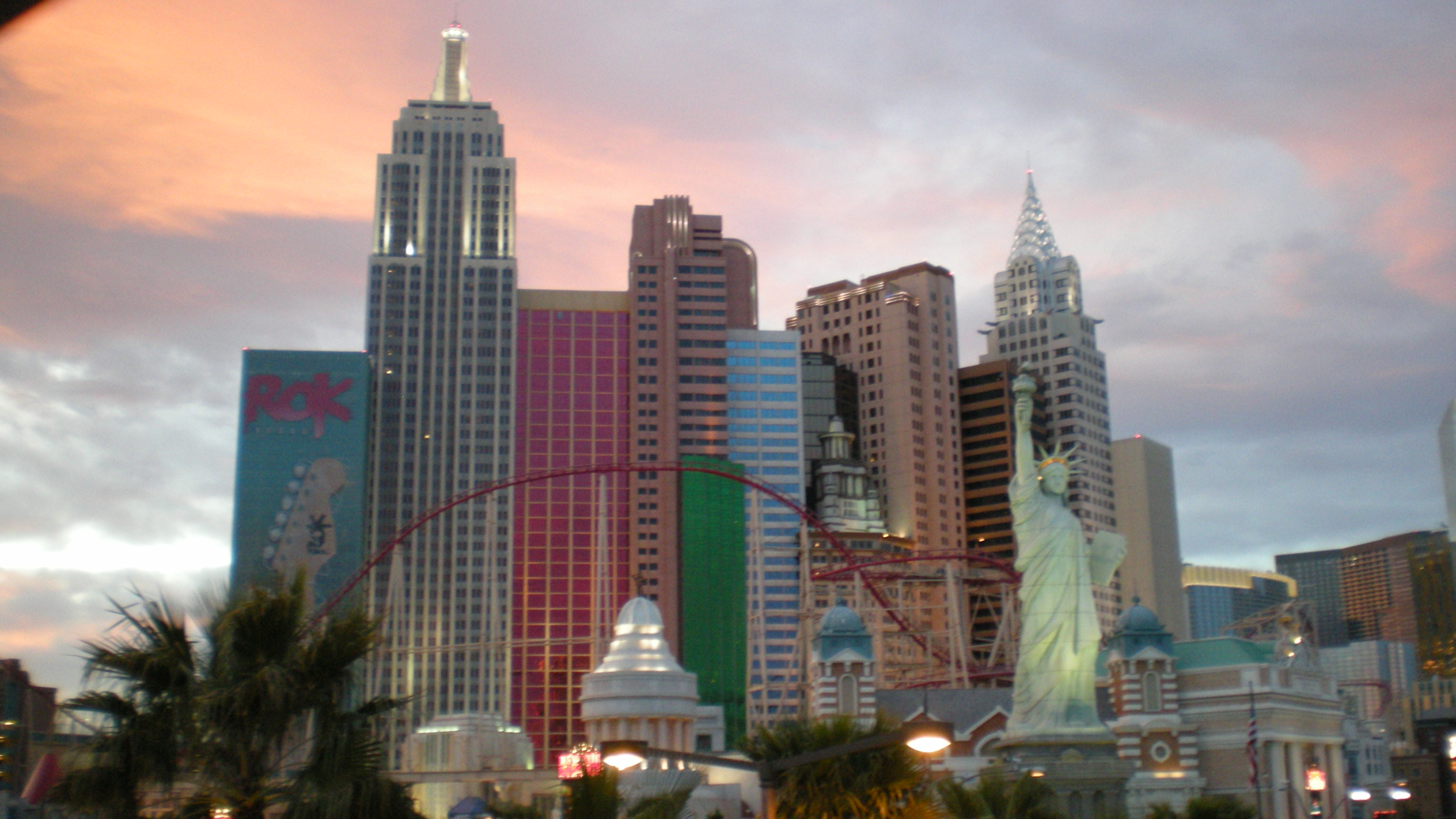
New York-New York Hotel and Casino in Las Vegas, complete with Statue of Liberty in the foreground

- There is a half-size replica at the New York-New York Hotel and Casino in Las Vegas, Nevada. In April 2011, the U.S. Postal Service announced that three billion postage stamps mistakenly based on a photograph of this replica were produced and would be sold to the public. In November 2013, the statue's sculptor, Robert Davidson, filed a copyright infringement suit against the U.S. government.
- Another small replica exists in Las Vegas on Route 589 near Arville St in a plaza parking lot.
- The city of Sioux Falls, South Dakota, erected a replacement bronze reproduction standing 9 ft (2.7 m) tall in McKennan Park atop the original pedestal of a long-vanished wooden replica.

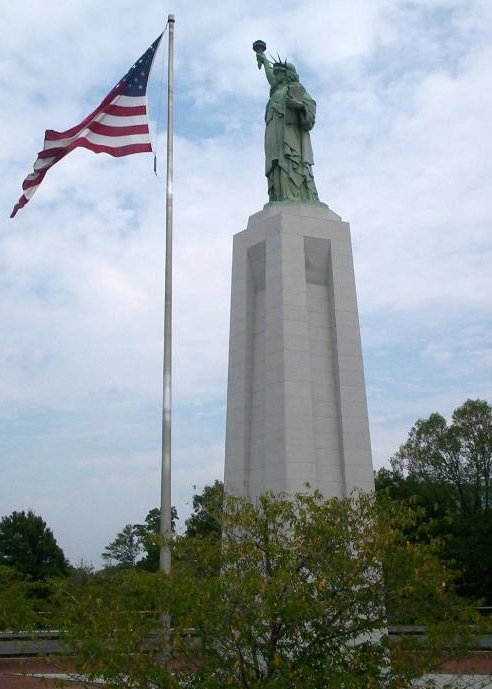
Liberty Enlightening the World replica in Birmingham, Alabama

- A 36-foot-tall (11 m) bronze replica, accurately based on Bartholdi's Liberty Enlightening the World, stands in Vestavia Hills, a suburb of Birmingham, Alabama. It was cast in 1956 at the Société Antoine Durenne foundry in Somerville, Haut Marne, France, for placement in 1958 atop the Liberty National Life Insurance Company building in downtown Birmingham. It was relocated and placed on a 60-foot-tall (18 m) granite pedestal adjacent to Interstate 459 in 1989.
- Two 30-foot (9.1 m) copper replicas by sculptor Leo Lentelli stand atop the Liberty National Bank Building in Buffalo, New York, nearly 354 feet (108 m) above street level.
- A 25-foot-tall (7.6 m) replica sits on the ruins of the late Marysville Bridge (erected on a platform (pier)) in the Dauphin Narrows of Susquehanna River north of Harrisburg. The replica was built by local activist Gene Stilp on July 2, 1986; it was made of Venetian blinds and stood 18 feet (5.5 m) tall. Six years later, after it was destroyed in a windstorm, it was rebuilt by Stilp and other local citizens, of wood, metal, glass and fiberglass, to a height of 25 feet (7.6 m).
- A Lego replica of the Statue of Liberty consisting of 2882 bricks and standing 0.9 m (3.0 ft) is a popular sculpture among Lego enthusiasts. The statue went out of production, but due to popular demand was returned to sale.
- A 1/12 replica of the Statue of Liberty made essentially out of junk stands at the intersection of US 280 and US 341 in McRae, Georgia. The head is made out of a stump from a nearby swamp, the arm holding the torch is made from styrofoam and the hand holding the book is actually an electric lineman's glove. The town's Lions Club erected the replica in 1986 during the statue's centennial.
- An 11-foot (3.4 m) miniature Statue of Liberty (holding a Bible instead of a tablet) currently stands atop a 15-foot (4.6 m) pedestal outside the Liberty Recycling plant in San Marcos, California. The company was named after the statue, which has been moved throughout northern San Diego County for over 80 years, originating at the Liberty Hotel in Leucadia, in the 1920s.

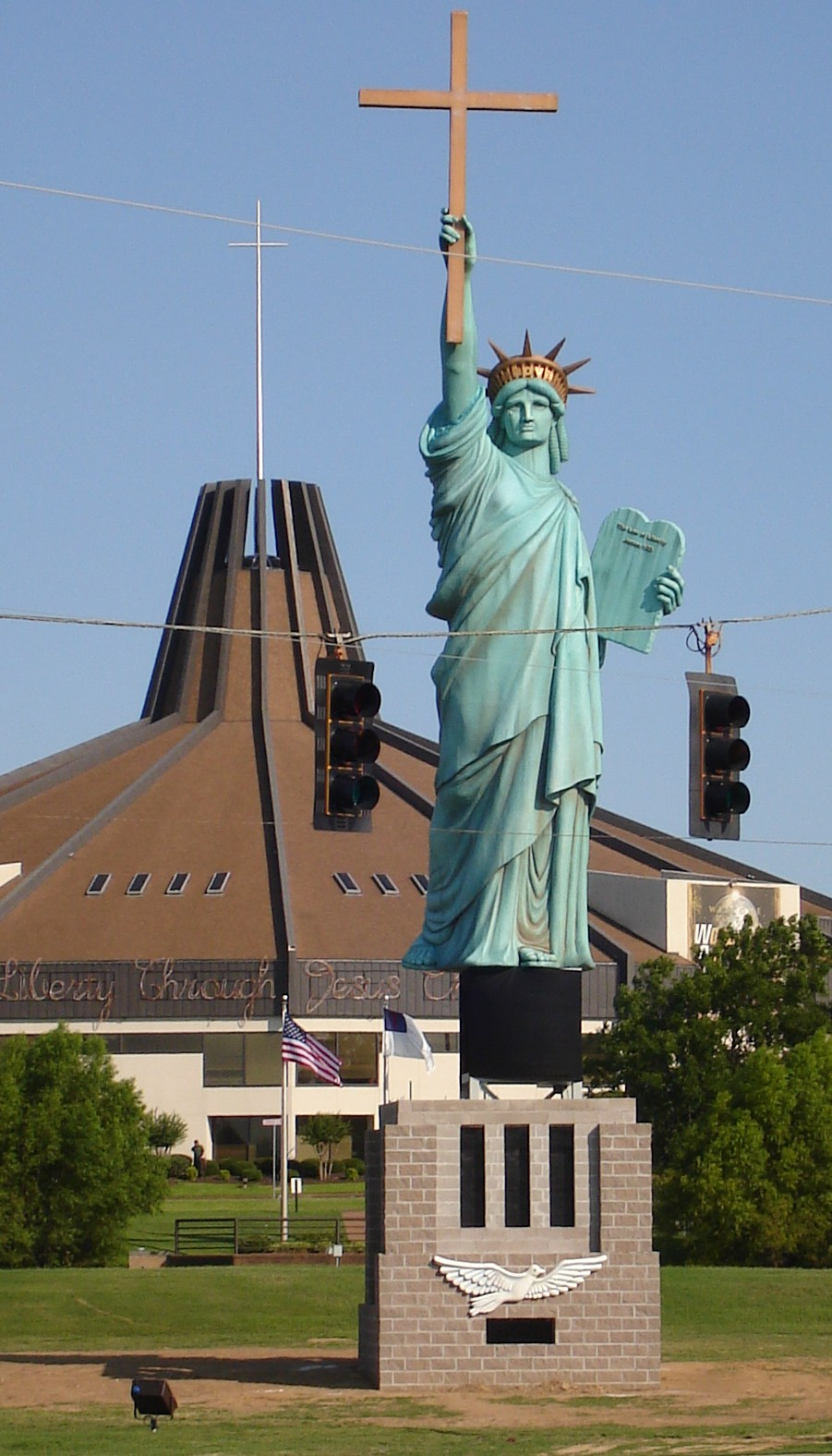
The Statue of Liberation Through Christ in Memphis.

- A 25-foot (7.6 m) replica of the statue, lofting a Christian cross, holding the Ten Commandments, and named the Statue of Liberation through Christ, was erected by a predominantly African American church in Memphis, Tennessee, on 4 July 2006.
- A small replica stands on the grounds of the Cherokee Capitol Building in Tahlequah, Oklahoma, a gift from the local Boy Scouts in 1950 (presumably as part of the above-mentioned national Boy Scout celebration).
- Fargo, North Dakota, also had a replica of the Statue of Liberty on the corner of Main Avenue and 2nd Street at the entrance of the Main Avenue bridge, which was reported stolen on July 26, 2019.
- There is a replica on the shoreline of Lake Chaubunagungamaug in Webster, Massachusetts.
- A 1/6-scale replica (≈50 feet including pedestal) stands in a parking lot of a strip mall in Milwaukie, Oregon, off McLoughlin Blvd at 4255 SE Roethe Rd.
- A 6-foot (1.8 m) replica stands at Statue of Liberty Plaza in West Seattle, Washington, at Alki Beach Park.
- A 10-foot (3.0 m) replica overlooks Interstate 5 in Everett, Washington from a private residence.
- A replica of the Statue of Liberty stands on Mackinac Island, Michigan.
- A replica of the Statue of Liberty is located in the downtown area of New Castle, Pennsylvania.
- A replica of the Statue of Liberty is located near the Lincoln High School in Ellwood City, Pennsylvania.
- A bronze replica of the Statue of Liberty resides in Neenah, Wisconsin. It was cast in California by the Great American Bronze Works. This version of the Statue of Liberty is 14 feet, 6 inches tall. It is 10 percent the size of the original.
- A replica approximately the same size as an adult person is located alongside Highway 80 at the west end of Forney, Texas. An earlier installation stood from 1986 until May 2016, when it was removed to make way for highway construction. As of November 2019, it has been replaced in nearly the same spot, this time painted a darker green and with an illuminated torch.
- A small statue stands on the grounds of the Chimbarazo Hospital Museum on the Richmond National Battlefield in Richmond, Virginia.
- A replica of the Statue of Liberty in Liberty Park at the entrance to the city of Schenectady, New York.
- A replica in Newton Falls, Ohio, used to stand in front of Liberty Tax Service in Leavittsburg, Ohio. It was donated to Newton Falls by the former owner of Liberty Tax Service when she closed the business.
- A 7-foot, 7-inch replica of the statue, built in 2013, stands in Old Church Park at the corner of Cherry and Morning Streets in Sunbury, Ohio.
- A replica of the statue stands in Guam, at the Paseo de Susana park, adjacent to the Hagatna Boat Basin. It was erected in 1950 by the Boy Scouts of America.

=== Argentina ===
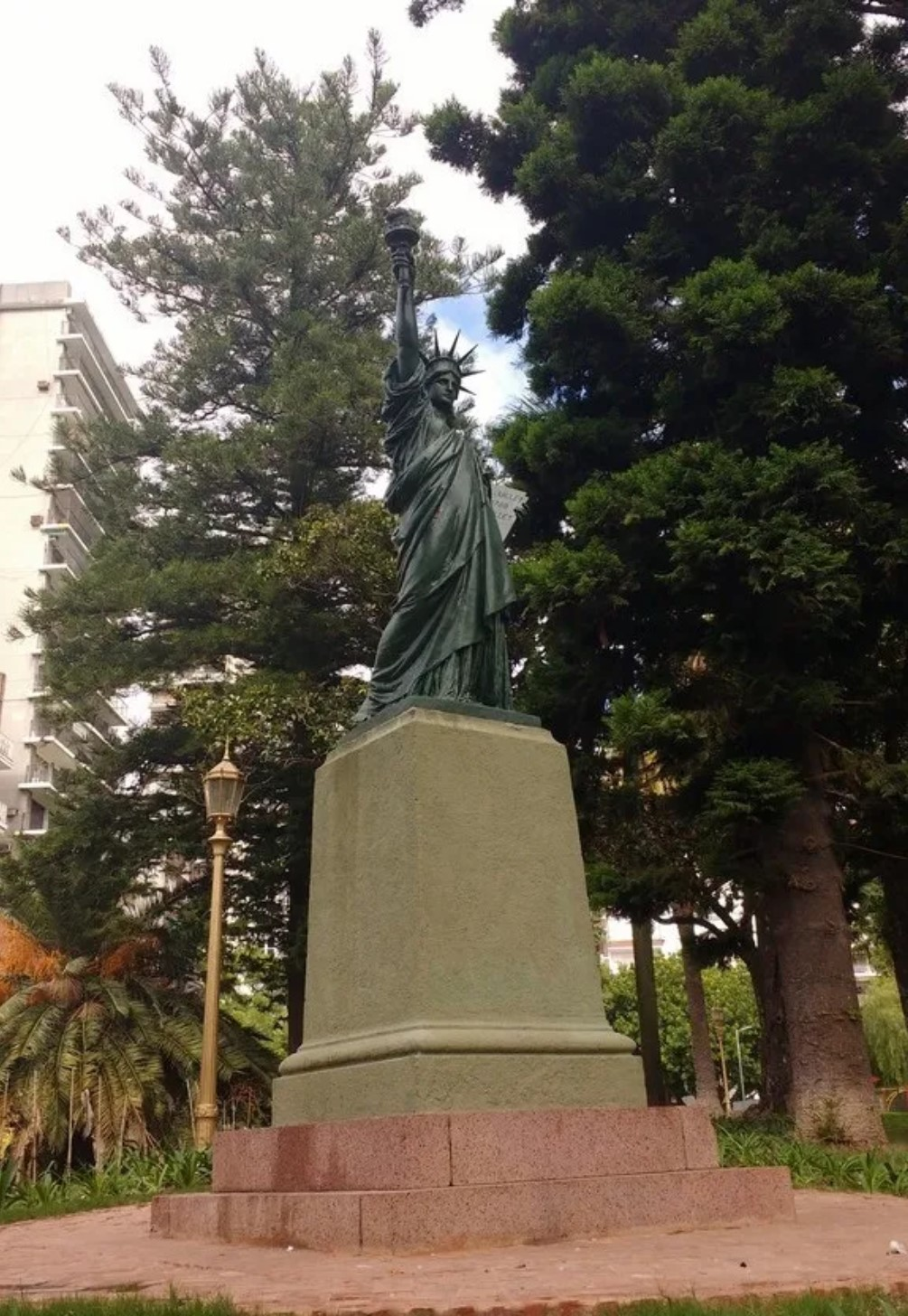
Statue of Liberty in Barrancas de Belgrano park, Buenos Aires City, Argentina, original from 1886

In Buenos Aires there is a small cast iron original replica in Barrancas de Belgrano Park located near the intersection of "La Pampa" and "Arribeños" streets. It is cast by Bartholdi from the same mould as those cast in Paris; although it is much smaller (3 meters tall). It was inaugurated on October 3, 1886, 25 days before the one in New York. On its base you can read the inscription “Val d'Osne – 8 Rue Voltaire, Paris”, the name of the French workshops and “1884” probably the year of creation. Another replica was bought by the government and placed in a school, Colegio Nacional Sarmiento, about the same date. There is another replica in Plaza Libertad (Liberty Square) in the city of Villa Aberastain, San Juan. This one was installed on the city square in 1931. There are also two cheaper non-metallic replicas; one is 6 m tall, located in the "New York" Casino in San Luis and the other crowns a commercial gallery, "Galería de Fabricantes", in Munro, a city in the northeast suburbs of Buenos Aires.

=== Brazil ===
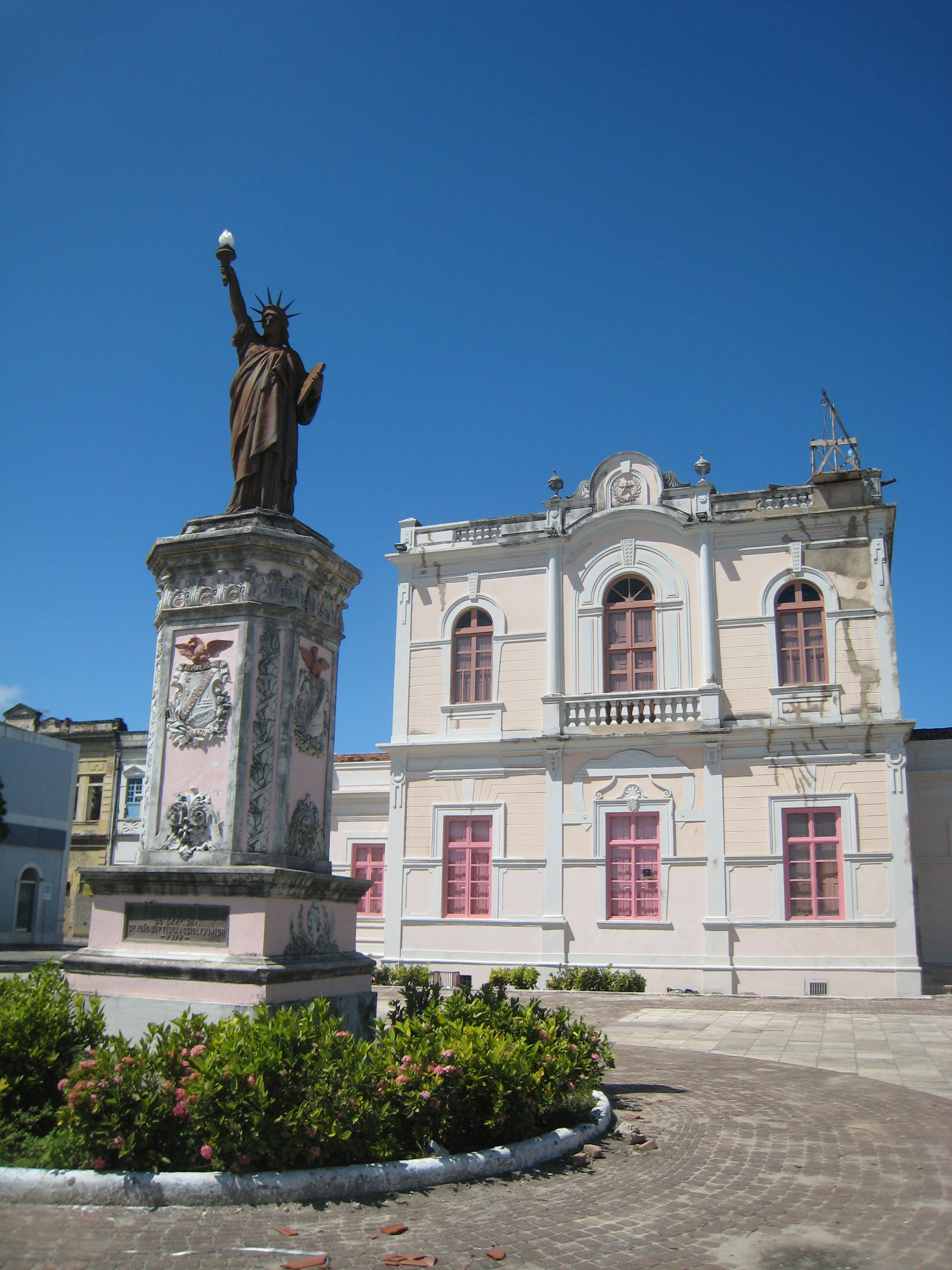
A replica of the Statue of Liberty in Maceió, Alagoas, Brazil

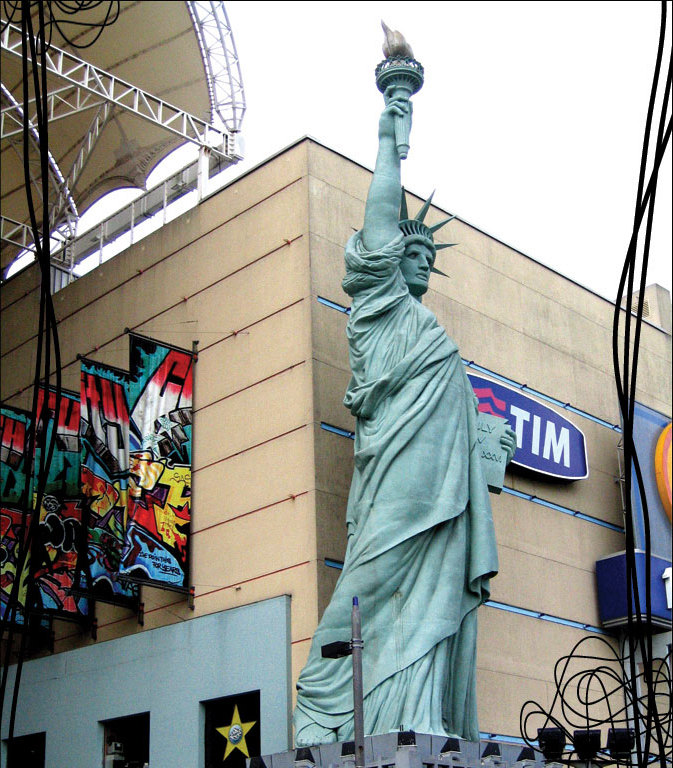
New York City Center shopping mall in Rio de Janeiro, Brazil

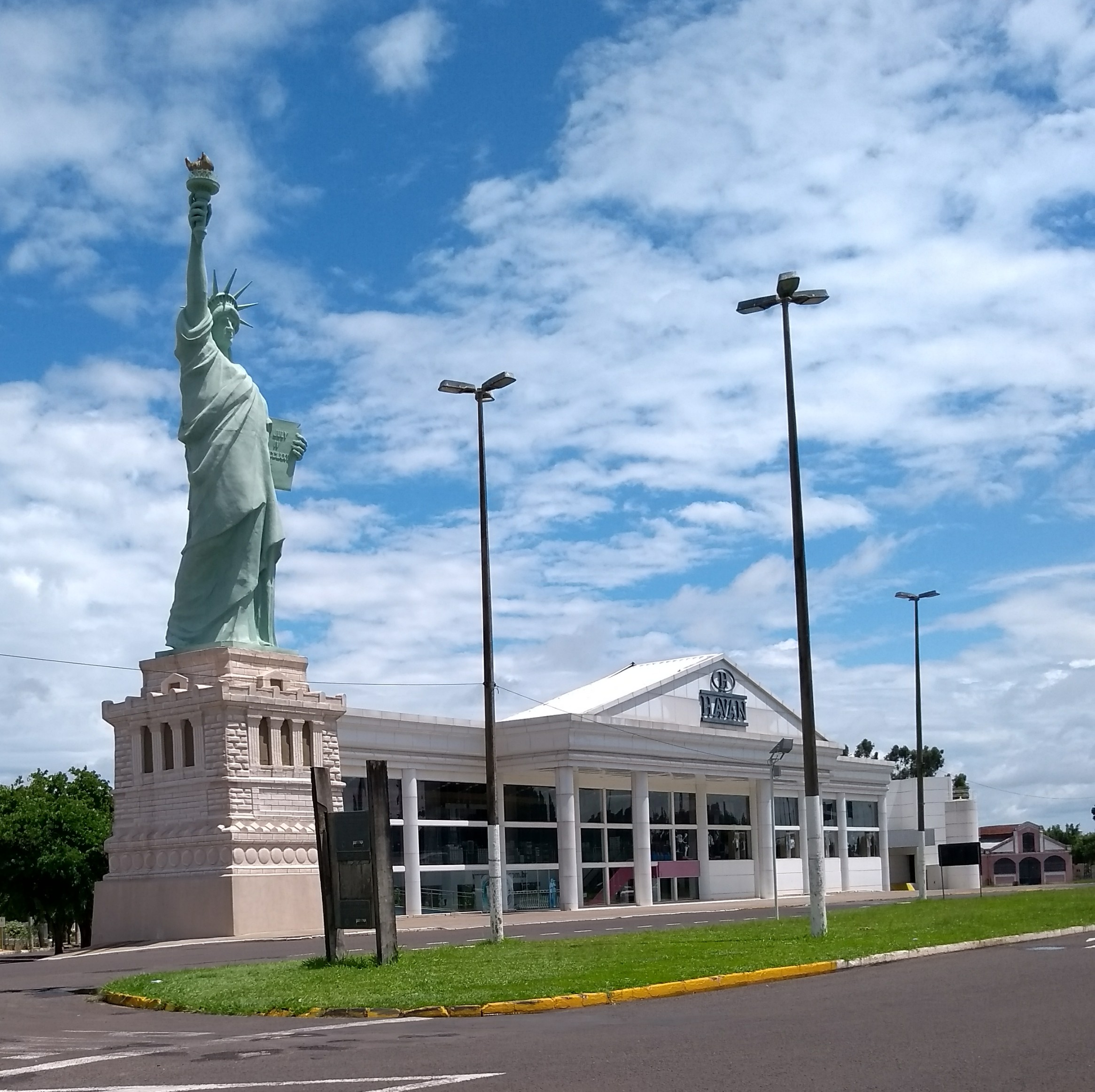
Havan department store in Araçatuba, Brazil

In Bangu, Rio de Janeiro exists a nickel replica made by Bartholdi in 1899. Bartholdi was commissioned by José Paranhos, Baron of Rio Branco to make a replica in order to celebrate the 10th anniversary of the Republic of Brazil. Until 1940, the statue was Paranhos family property. In 1940 the statue was passed to Guanabara State. On 20 January 1964, Carlos Lacerda, governor of Guanabara State, placed the statue in Miami Square, Bangu. 22.856681°S 43.492577°W

A small-scale cast metal replica can be found in Maceió, the capital of Alagoas State, in northeast Brazil. The replica is in front of a building constructed in 1869 as the seat of the Conselho Provincial (Provincial Council), and which today is the Museu da Imagem e do Som de Alagoas (Museum of Image and Sound of Alagoas). This replica is possibly a casting produced by the Fundição Val d'Osne in France, as in the Praça Lavenere Machado (formerly Praça Dois Leões) on the opposite side of the museum, there are four somewhat larger-than-life size cast metal statues of wild animals, at least one of which is embossed with the name of the foundry. These castings and the replica all appear to be made of similar material and to be of similar age. It is also probable that they are near contemporaries of the actual Statue of Liberty. 9.6728563°S 35.7223114°W

A large modern replica stands in front of the New York City Center, a shopping center constructed in 1999 in Barra da Tijuca in the State of Rio de Janeiro. 22.9992837°S 43.360481°W

The Havan department store chain has replicas in many of their stores. The largest one of these, 57 meters tall, is allegedly in the Barra Velha branc, in the state of Santa Catarina.26.635870°S 48.698708°W There is another large replica the parking area of a Havan Department Store on the outskirts of Curitiba, in the State of Paraná, opened in 2000. 25.4639912°S 49.2521676°W

Also, there is a small replica of the statue in Belém, in front of a Belém Importados store, near the city's port.

On Monday December 15th, 2025 a powerful storm hit Guaíba, Brazil which caused the Statue of Liberty to collapse near a McDonald's, Fortunately, no injuries or deaths have been reported.

=== Ecuador ===
In Guayaquil, a little replica gives the name of "New York" to a neighborhood in the Valle Alto area.

=== Peru ===
In Lima the New York Casino in the Jesús María District has a small replica in the main entrance. The casino is a tribute to the state of New York and the USA.

In Arequipa, the Plaza Las Américas in the Cerro Colorado district has a small replica in the monument in the middle of the square on top of a globe pointing to the American continent.

== Asia ==
=== India ===
A small replica can be found in Vardhaman Fantasy, an amusement park in Mira Road, Mumbai along with six other wonders of the world.

The 7 wonders of the world are made in Eco Park, Kolkata, West Bengal.

Another small replica can be found in Seven Wonders Park, a park in Kotri, Kota, Rajasthan along with six other wonders of the world.

=== United Arab Emirates ===
A large replica can be found in Global Village Park in Dubai.

=== Malaysia ===
A large replica can be found in Genting Highlands in the state of Pahang.

=== Singapore ===
A small replica can be found in Haw Par Villa, a theme park.

=== China ===
==== Guangzhou ====
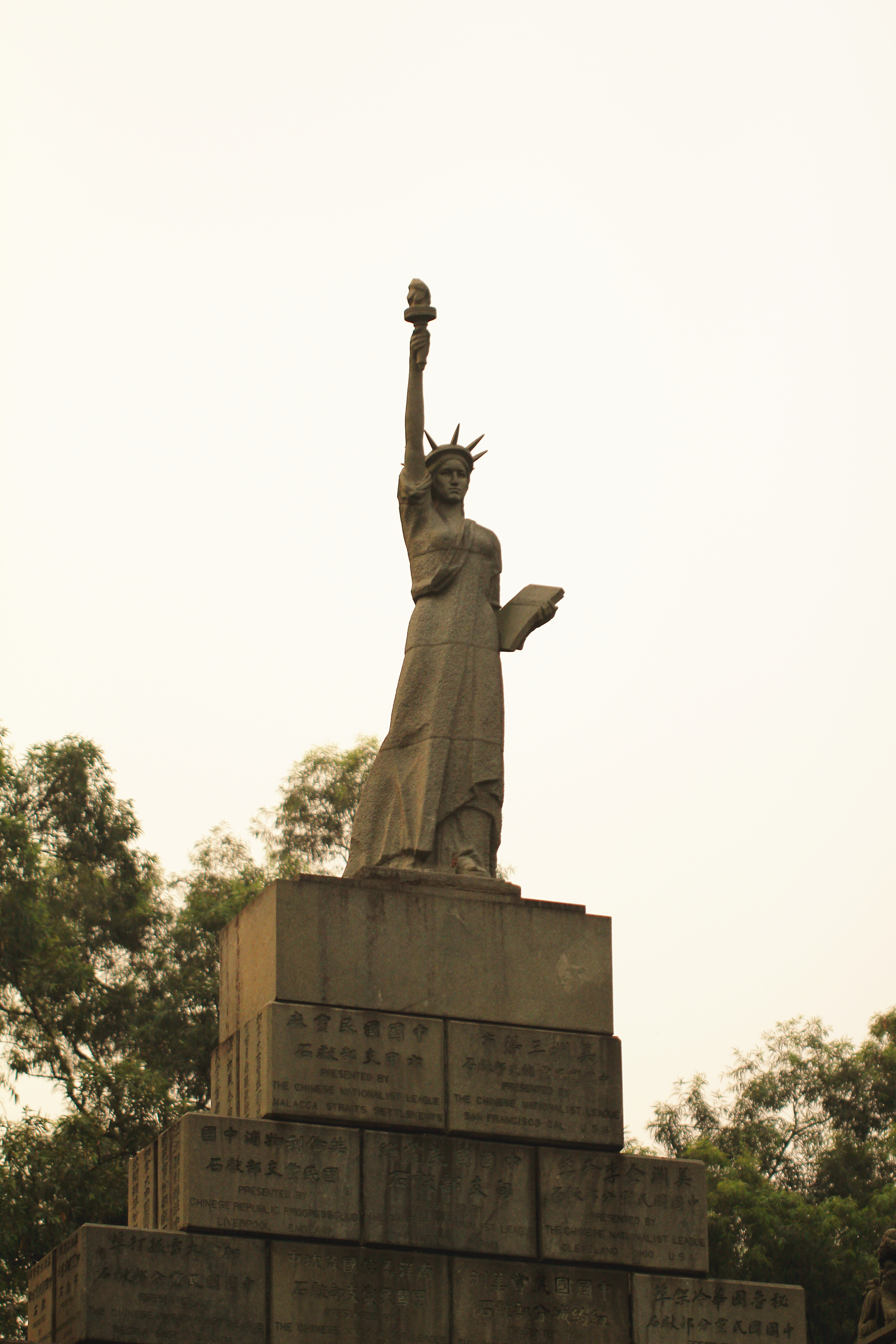
Replica of the Statue of Liberty in Guangzhou

Siting on top of the memorial tomb of "72 Martyrs of Huanghuagang" (see Huanghuagang Uprising). The current one was re-built in 1981.

==== Beijing ====
During the Tiananmen Square protest of 1989, Chinese student demonstrators in Beijing built a 10 m (33 ft) image called the Goddess of Democracy, which sculptor Tsao Tsing-yuan said was intentionally "dissimilar" to the Statue of Liberty to avoid being "too openly pro-American." (See article for a list of replicas of that statue.)

==== Shenzhen ====
A replica can be found in Window of the World Park.

=== Israel ===
A 15-foot-high (4.6 m) replica of the Statue of Liberty is at the western entrance of the village of Arraba in Israel, near a local restaurant.

At a highway intersection in Jerusalem called "New York Square," there is an abstract skeletal replica of the statue.

The 13-foot-high (4.0 m) Statue of Liberty, crafted by YouFine Sculpture, was custom-made for an Israeli resident and installed in front of his newly constructed yard. This bespoke piece highlights Liberty sculpture has entered the homes of ordinary people."Custom Made Large Statue of Liberty". YouFine.

=== Japan ===
The French Statue of Liberty from the Île aux Cygnes came to Odaiba, Tokyo, from April 1998 to May 1999 in commemoration of "The French year in Japan". Because of its popularity, in 2000 a replica of the French Statue of Liberty was erected at the same place. The Tokyo Bay statue is about 1/7th the size of the statue in New York Harbor. In Japan, a small Statue of Liberty is in the Amerika-mura (American Village) shopping district in Osaka, Japan. Another replica is in Oirase near the town of Shimoda south of Misawa in Aomori Prefecture, where the United States has an 8,000-person U.S. Air Force base. A replica of the Statue of Liberty in Ishinomaki, Miyagi Prefecture, was damaged by the 2011 Tōhoku earthquake and tsunami. There is also a replica in Oyabe, Toyama.

=== Pakistan ===
There are replicas of the Statue of Liberty in Bahria Town, Lahore, and also in Bahria Town Phase 8, Islamabad.

=== Philippines ===
As early as January 1945, there were already news of a campaign that would help erect a Statue of Liberty replica in the Philippines. The said monument was supposed to be sponsored by The Chicago Daily Times whose goal was "to commemorate one of the great epics in the struggle for human freedom–the liberation of the Philippines."

In 1950, the Boy Scouts of America marked its 40th anniversary. Jack P. Whitaker, the Scout Commissioner of the Kansas City Area Council at the time, had previously proposed the idea of creating and distributing replicas of the Statue of Liberty to every U.S. state and territory, as well as the Philippines.

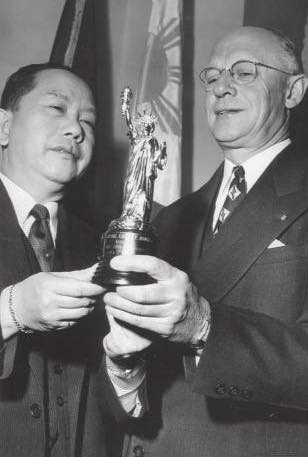
Chief Scout Executive Arthur A. Shuck presenting to Carlos P. Romulo a miniature of the Statue of Liberty in April 1950.

The eight-foot statues, which were cast in bronze, were distributed all over the U.S. and the world from 1949 to 1951. Almost 200 replicas were delivered to the 39 states of the U.S. and countries such as Panama and Puerto Rico. The Boy Scouts of the Philippines, on the other hand, received its own replica in the early part of 1950.

The statues were donated by the Boy Scouts of America as "an expression of scout brotherhood and goodwill." Their 40th anniversary theme was "Strengthen the Arm of Liberty."

Miniature versions of the statue were also given as gifts. The Philippines became the first independent nation to receive one of the 4,000 eight-inch statues from the Boy Scouts of America. In April 1950, the said statue was officially given by Chief Scout Executive Arthur A. Shuck to Carlos P. Romulo, then chief of the Philippine Mission to the United Nations.

In the Philippines, several places were suggested as the site where the eight-foot bronze replica would be erected. The task of choosing the perfect site was delegated to the National Urban Planning Commission, and among those it considered were “Engineer Island, atop the proposed reviewing stand on the Rizal Park, and on the center island rotunda between the Old Legislative building and Manila City Hall.”

In the end, the Boy Scouts of the Philippines (BSP) erected the statue just outside Intramuros. As the icon of the United States, the replica of Lady Liberty would survive several attacks by student protesters in the 1960s. It remained standing until the early 1970s, when the BSP decided to transfer it to the Scout Reservation in Mt. Makiling which would serve as the statue's home for two decades or so.

In a 2002 article published by the Philippine Star, then BSP PR head Nixon Canlapan revealed that the Statue of Liberty was eventually moved and stored at the BSP headquarters on Concepcion Street (now Natividad Almeda-Lopez) in Ermita, Manila.

Turns out, the U.S.-sponsored replica was not the first Lady Liberty in Manila. In the 1930s, one of Manila's biggest shopping stores at that time became the talk of the town not just for its products but also for its unique multi-story building. Located in Juan Luna Street, the L.R. Aguinaldo's Emporium had an Art Deco facade featuring two contrasting statues: Andres Bonifacio on the right and the Statue of Liberty on the left.

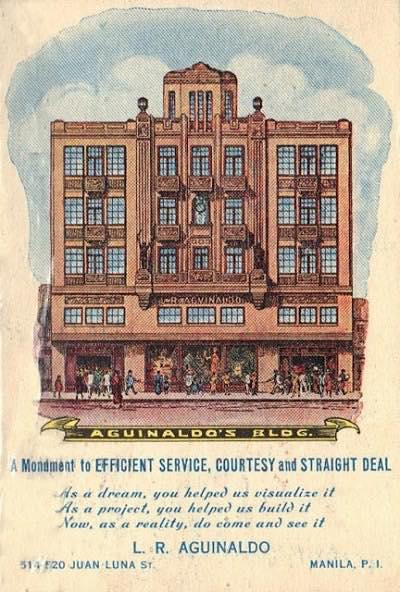
Established by the Philippine retailing pioneer Leopoldo R. Aguinaldo, the L.R. Aguinaldo's Emporium was once one of the biggest shopping stores in pre-war Manila, located in Juan Luna Street, Manila. The multi-story building's facade featured a statue of Andres Bonifacio on the right and a replica of the statue of Liberty on the left.

Founded by the Philippine retailing pioneer Leopoldo R. Aguinaldo, the establishment would eventually be recognized as Aguinaldo's Department Store. Following the war, Leopoldo's son, Francisco, assumed control of the business, and subsequently, the store relocated to Echague.

The Echague branch in the 1950s was known for introducing its customers to quality products both from the Philippines and abroad. It also commissioned young interior designers to update the store's furniture section. Thus, the store catapulted the careers of famous designers like Myra Cruz, Edgar Ramirez, and Bonnie Ramos, among others. Aguinaldo's succumbed to the competition and closed in the 1960s. The original building in Juan Luna Street still stands, along with both the Bonifacio and the Liberty statues.

Since the creation of the Liberty statues in Intramuros and Juan Luna Street, other Philippine provinces soon followed suit. Statue of Liberty replicas in can be found in Pangasinan and as far as Camp John Hay amphitheater in Baguio.

=== Thailand ===
The Mini Siam and Mini Europe model village, in Pattaya, has a miniature Statue of Liberty amongst others.

=== Taiwan ===
There are at least two Statue of Liberty replicas (greater than 30 feet in height) in Taiwan. These two statues are in the cities of Keelung and Taipei.

=== Vietnam ===
From 1887 to 1945, Hanoi was home to another copy of the statue. Measuring 2.85 m (9 ft 4 in) tall, it was erected by the French colonial government after being sent from France for an exhibition. It was known to locals unaware of its history as Tượng Bà đầm xòe (Statue of the Western lady wearing dress). When the French lost control of French Indochina during World War II, the statue was toppled on 1 August 1945, after being deemed a vestige of the colonial government along with other statues erected by the French.

== Australia ==
A 30-foot replica was once found at the Westfield Marion shopping complex in Adelaide, South Australia. The statue was demolished in 2019.
