= French ambassador's residence in Washington, D.C. =

- The French Ambassador's residence
- U.S. Historic district – Contributing property
- Location: 2221 Kalorama Road, NW; Washington, D.C.
- Coordinates: 38°55′5.556″N 77°3′2.574″W
- Built: 1910; 116 years ago
- Architect: Jules Henri de Sibour
- Architectural style: Tudor Revival
- Part of: Sheridan-Kalorama Historic District (ID89001743)
- Added to NRHP: 1989

The French ambassador's residence in Washington, D.C. is located at 2221 Kalorama Road, N.W., in the Kalorama neighborhood of Northwest Washington, D.C.

== History ==
The residence, built in 1910, was designed by the French-born American architect Jules Henri de Sibour for William Watson Lawrence (1859-1916), a paint and white lead manufacturer. It was later the home of the mining millionaire John Hays Hammond. The mansion was purchased by the French government in 1936, and served as the French chancery (embassy building) until 1985, when the current chancery in northwest Washington was completed on Reservoir Road. The completion of the Reservoir Road embassy allowed the 400 employees of the French diplomatic mission at the time to work in a single location, rather than at the ten different offices scattered around Washington, where French diplomats had previously worked.

In 1941, the French government purchased additional lots of land overlooking Kalorama Circle, bringing the total size of the property to 3.6 acres (1.5 ha). In 2017, however, the French government sold an empty tract of 0.58 acres (0.23 ha) of the property. The sale brought the total size of the property to about 3 acres (1.2 ha), which is still the largest tract of land in Kalorama.

In February 2015, the manor house reopened after undergoing a $4.5 million, two-year renovation and restoration. During the renovation, Ambassador Gérard Araud, lived in a house in Foxhall Road.

On Bastille Day 2021, a replica of the Statue of Liberty that used to reside at the Musée des Arts et Métiers in Paris was installed and dedicated on the grounds of the residence.

== Description and use ==
It is the largest single-family home in the Kalorama neighborhood; a 1980 guidebook published by Smithsonian Institution Press describes the home's setting as "a dramatic and beautiful site high above Rock Creek." Constructed of brick and limestone, the mansion house is described in National Register of Historic Places papers as an "imposing structure" with irregular massing, with its most prominent feature being a "dominant entry bay with large gables is anchored by two flanking square towers, each capped by a stone balustrade." Its architectural style has been variously described as Tudor Revival Jacobean Revival, and French Eclectic. In 2015, the estimated value of the property was $25–30 million. The home is 27,000 square feet (2,500 m^{2}) in size and has 19 bedrooms.

Known for its elegant parties, the home features art and decoration in both formal/traditional styles and modern styles. The main floor features several large reception rooms, including a dining room, an Empire Salon in the formal style, a "Winter Salon" in the modern style, and the Salon des Boiseries (paneled room) and, to the rear of the building, a terrace. The main floor also includes a huge entrance hall and grand staircase. Three guest rooms and the ambassador's private apartment are on the floor above; additional guest rooms are on the topmost floor. The art includes pieces borrowed from Versailles and the Louvre. Works are mostly by French artists such as Pierre Bonnard, but also by non-French artists such as Igor Mitoraj. The residents hosts some 10,000 people annually for receptions, cocktails, cultural events, and other occasions.

It is designated as one of many contributing properties to the Sheridan-Kalorama Historic District, a historic district roughly bounded by Connecticut Avenue, N.W., Florida Avenue, N.W., 22nd Street, N.W., P Street, N.W., and Rock Creek. The district was listed on the National Register of Historic Places in 1989.
