= Musée des Arts et Métiers =

Industrial design museum in Paris

Coordinates: 48°51′58″N 2°21′19″E

Museum of Arts and Crafts
- Musée des Arts et Métiers

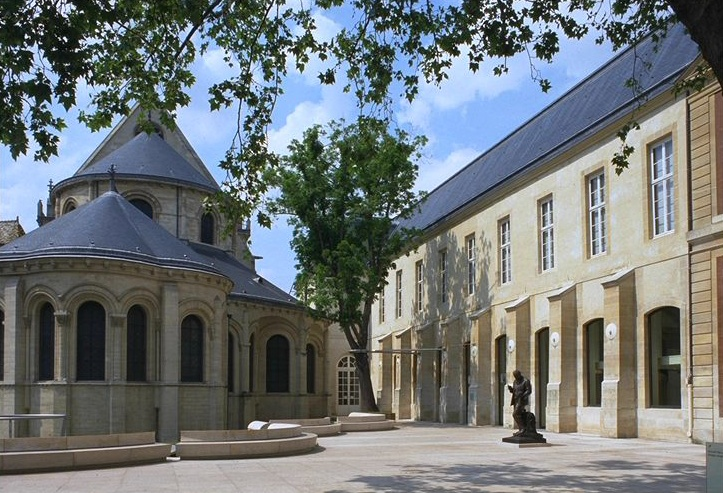
- Established: 1794
- Location: 60, rue Réaumur, 75003 Paris
- Collection size: 80,000
- Visitors: 250,000 / year
- Website: www.arts-et-metiers.net

The Musée des Arts et Métiers (French pronunciation: [myze dez‿aʁ e metje]; English: Museum of Arts and Crafts) is a museum in Paris that houses the collection of the Conservatoire national des arts et métiers, which was founded in 1794 as a repository for the preservation of scientific instruments and inventions.

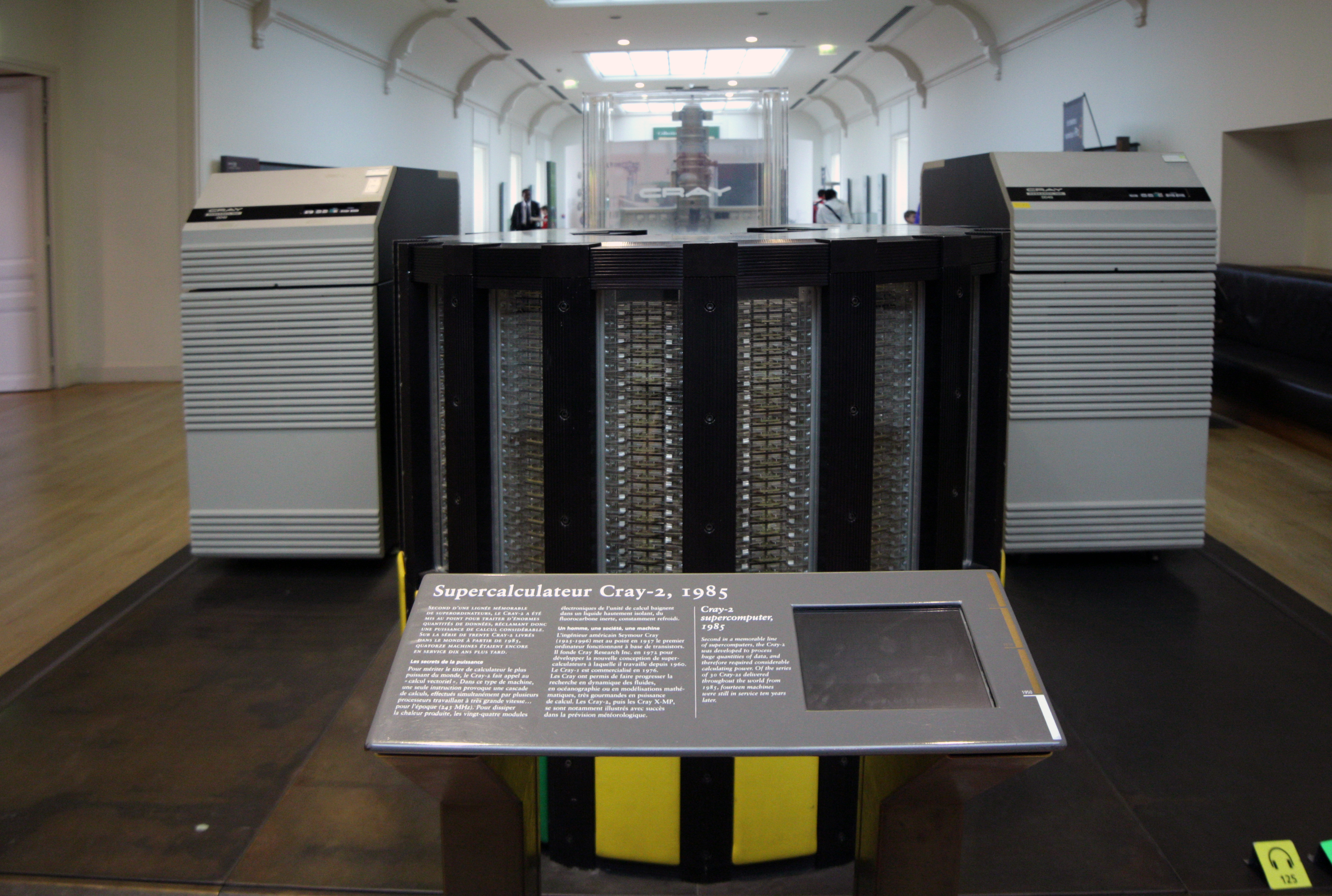
A 1985 supercomputer Cray-2

== History ==
Since its foundation, the museum has been housed in the deserted priory of Saint-Martin-des-Champs on the Rue Réaumur in the 3rd arrondissement of Paris. Today the museum, which underwent major renovations in 1990, includes an additional building adjacent to the abbey, with larger objects remaining in the abbey itself.

== Collection ==
The museum has over 80,000 objects and 15,000 drawings in its collection, of which about 2,500 are on display in Paris. The rest of the collection is preserved in a storehouse in Saint-Denis. Among its collection is an original version of the Foucault pendulum, the original model of Liberty Enlightening the World (commonly known as the Statue of Liberty) by Frédéric Auguste Bartholdi, some of the first planes (Clément Ader's Avion III, Louis Blériot's Blériot XI...), and Blaise Pascal's Pascaline (the first mechanical calculator).

The museum presents seven different collections: Scientific Instruments, Materials, Energy, Mechanics, Construction, Communication, Transportation. In the former church of St-Martin-des-Champs Priory are displayed cars, planes, the Foucault Pendulum and some other monumental objects.

The first portable steam engine and self propelled vehicle (automobile) Nicolas Cugnot's 1770 Fardier has been in this collection for over 200 years.

== Gallery ==
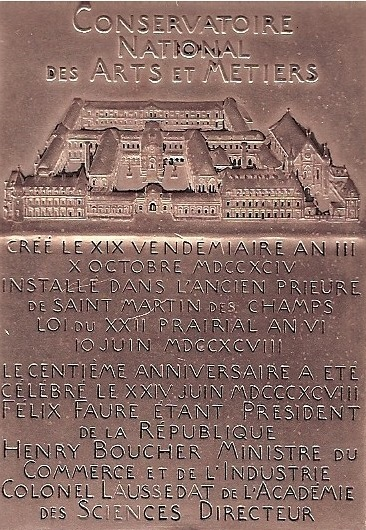
Plaque of the Conservatoire national des arts et métiers (Paris)

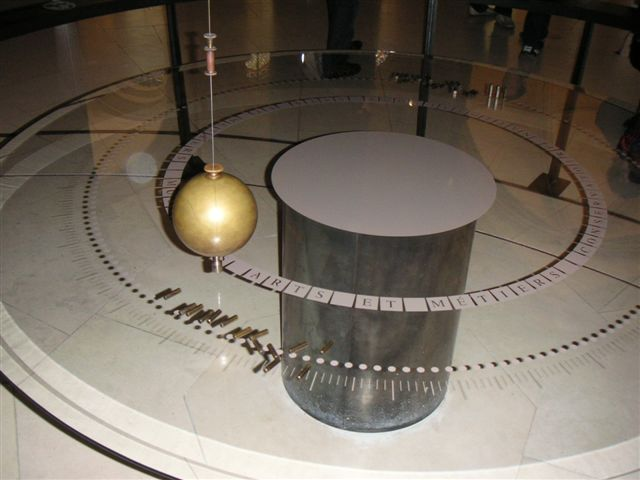
The original Foucault pendulum at the Musée des Arts et Métiers in 2005

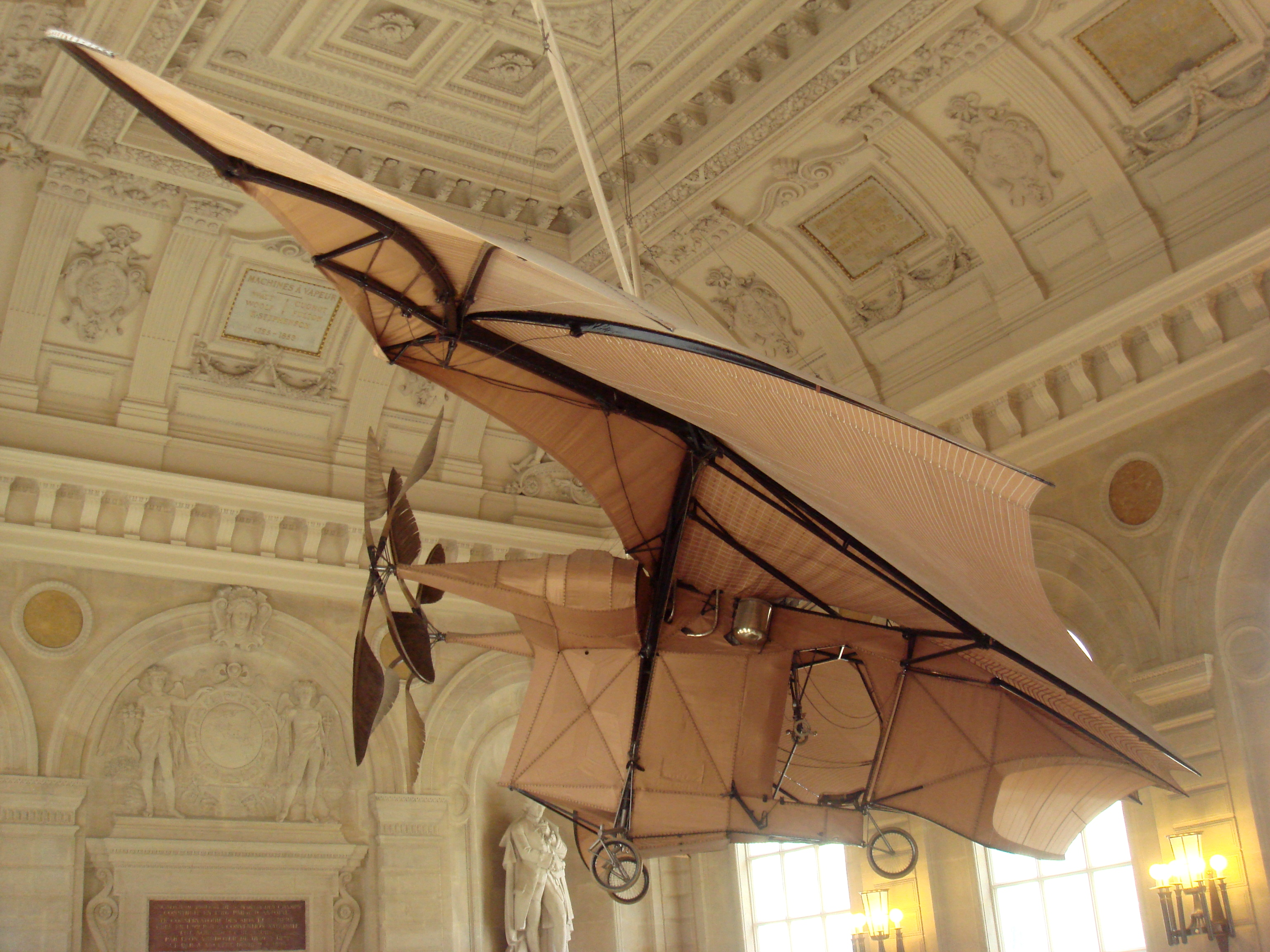
Clément Ader's Avion III at the Musée des Arts et Métiers

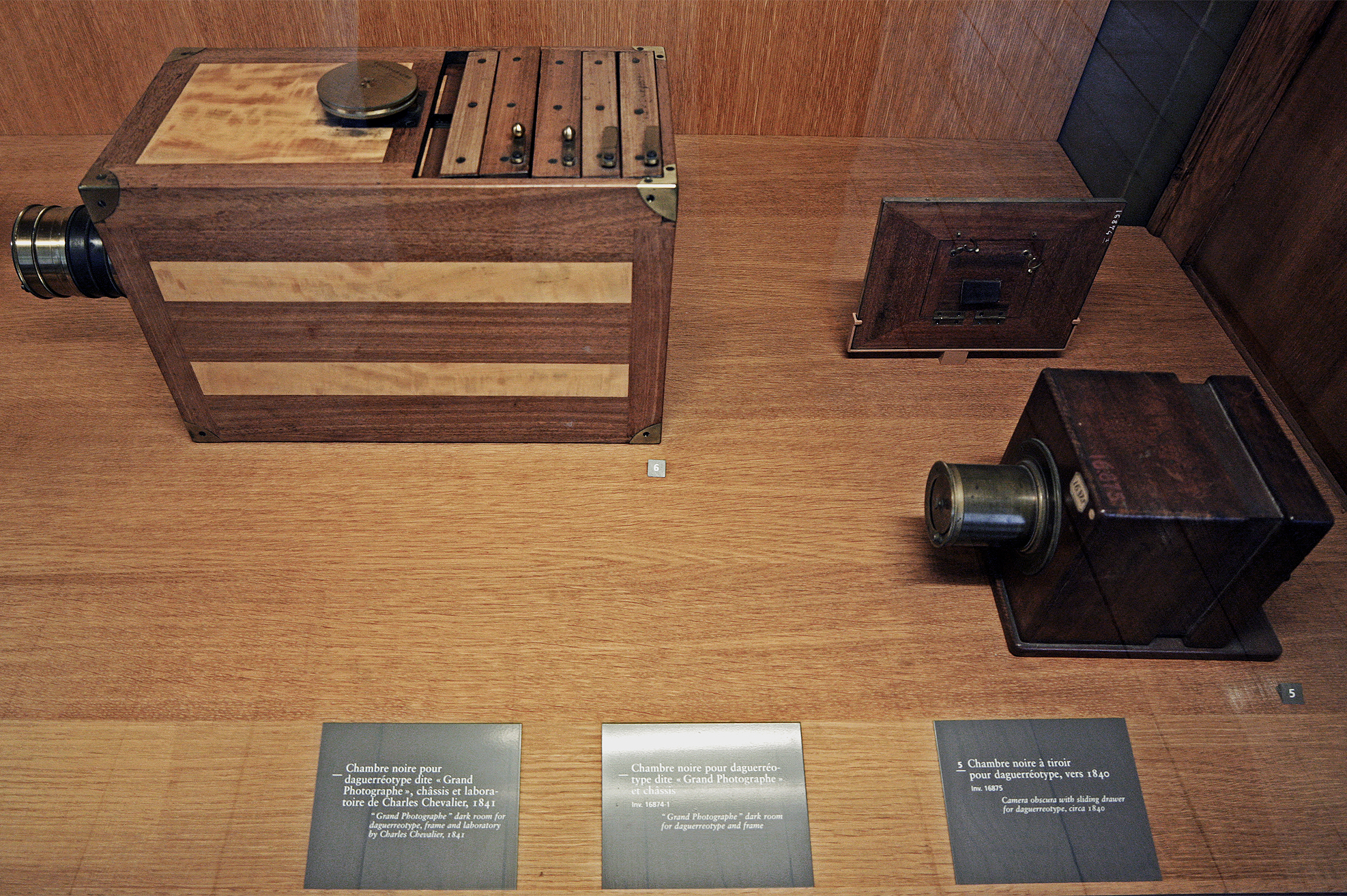
1840-1841 cameras obscurae for Daguerreotype called "Grand Photographe" produced by Charles Chevalier

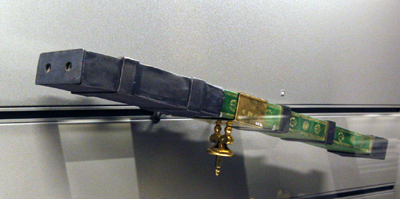
Binoculars, by Father Chérubin d'Orléans, 1681, Musée des Arts et Métiers

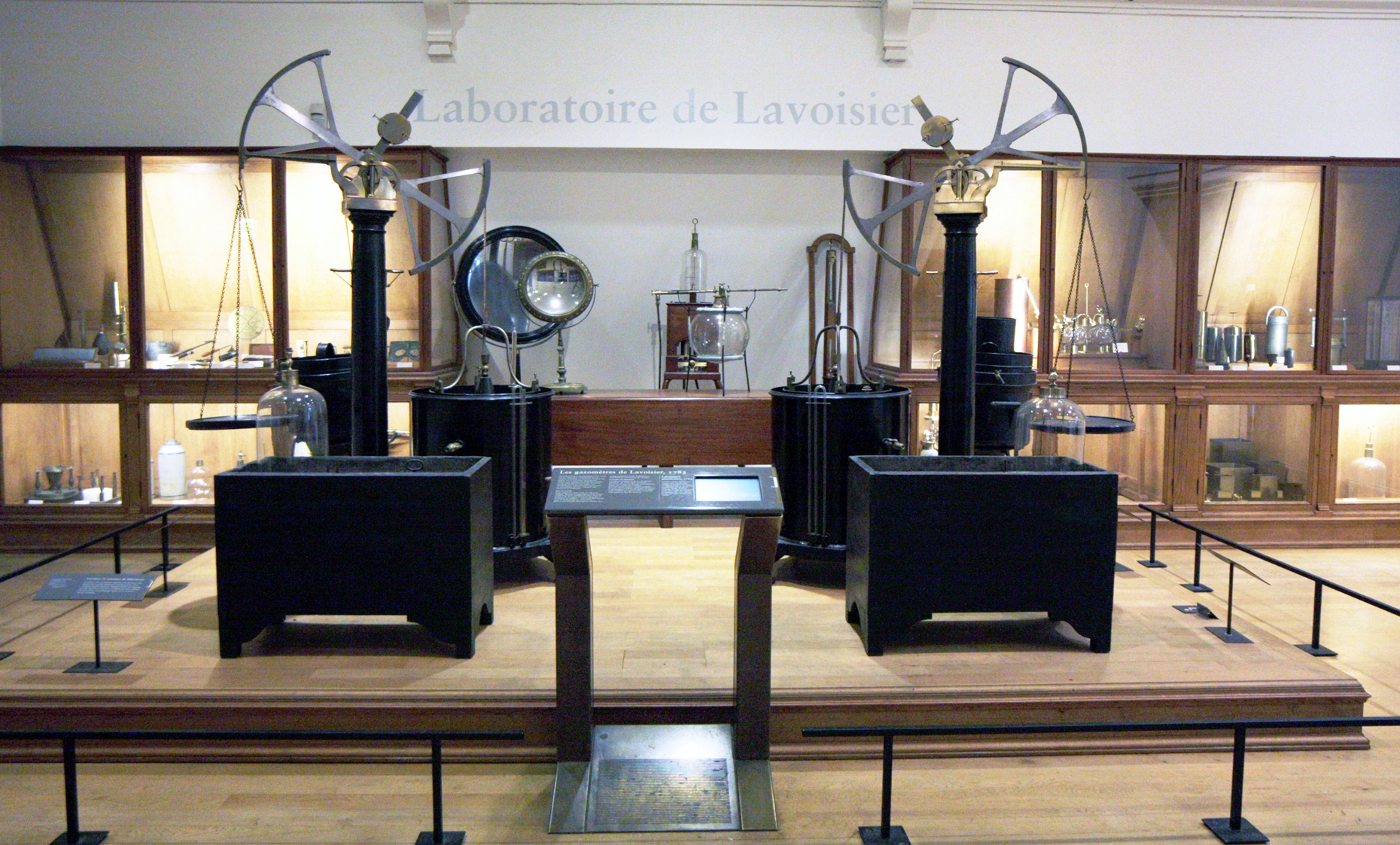
Lavoisier's Laboratory, Musée des Arts et Métiers, Paris

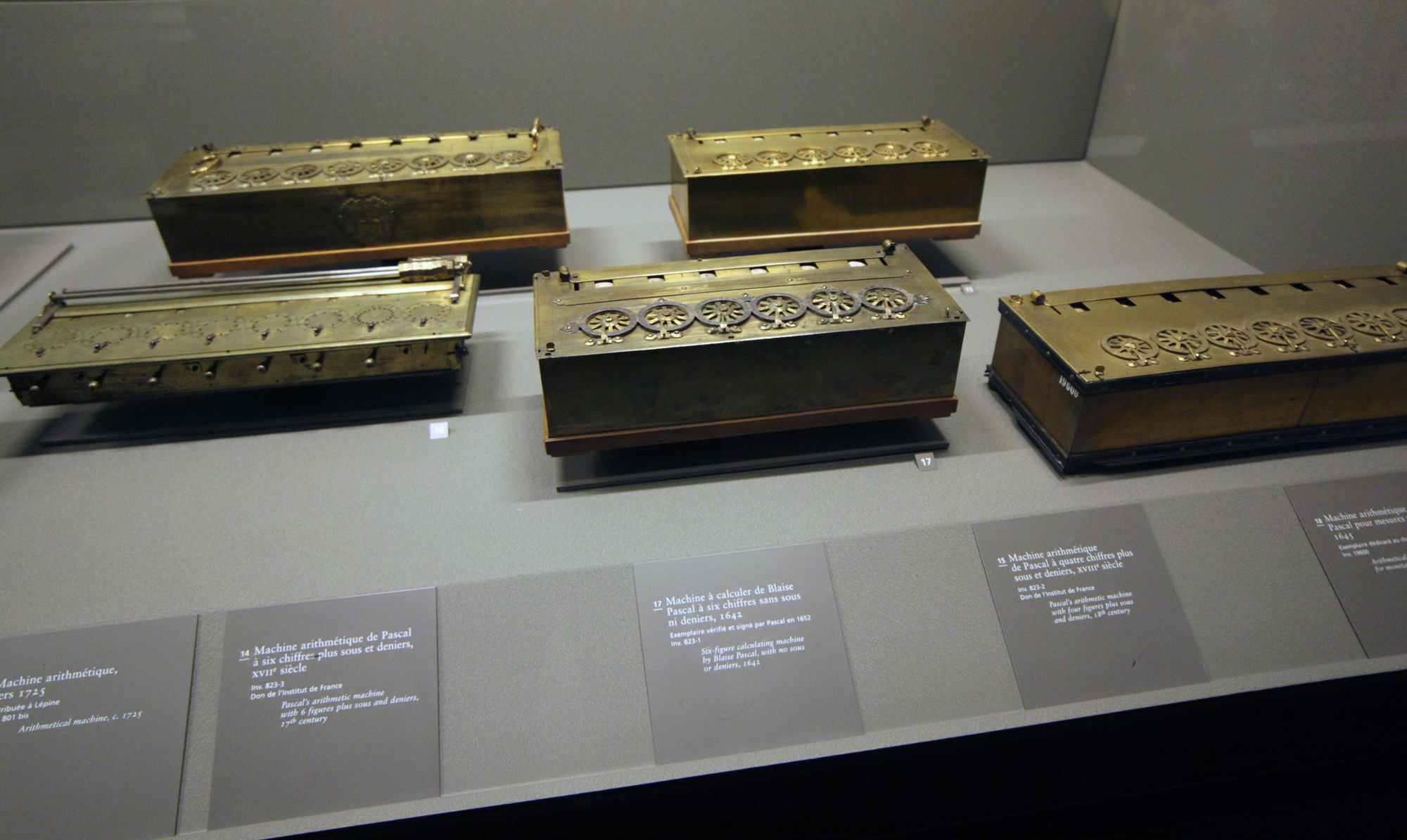
Versions of Blaise Pascal's mechanical calculators

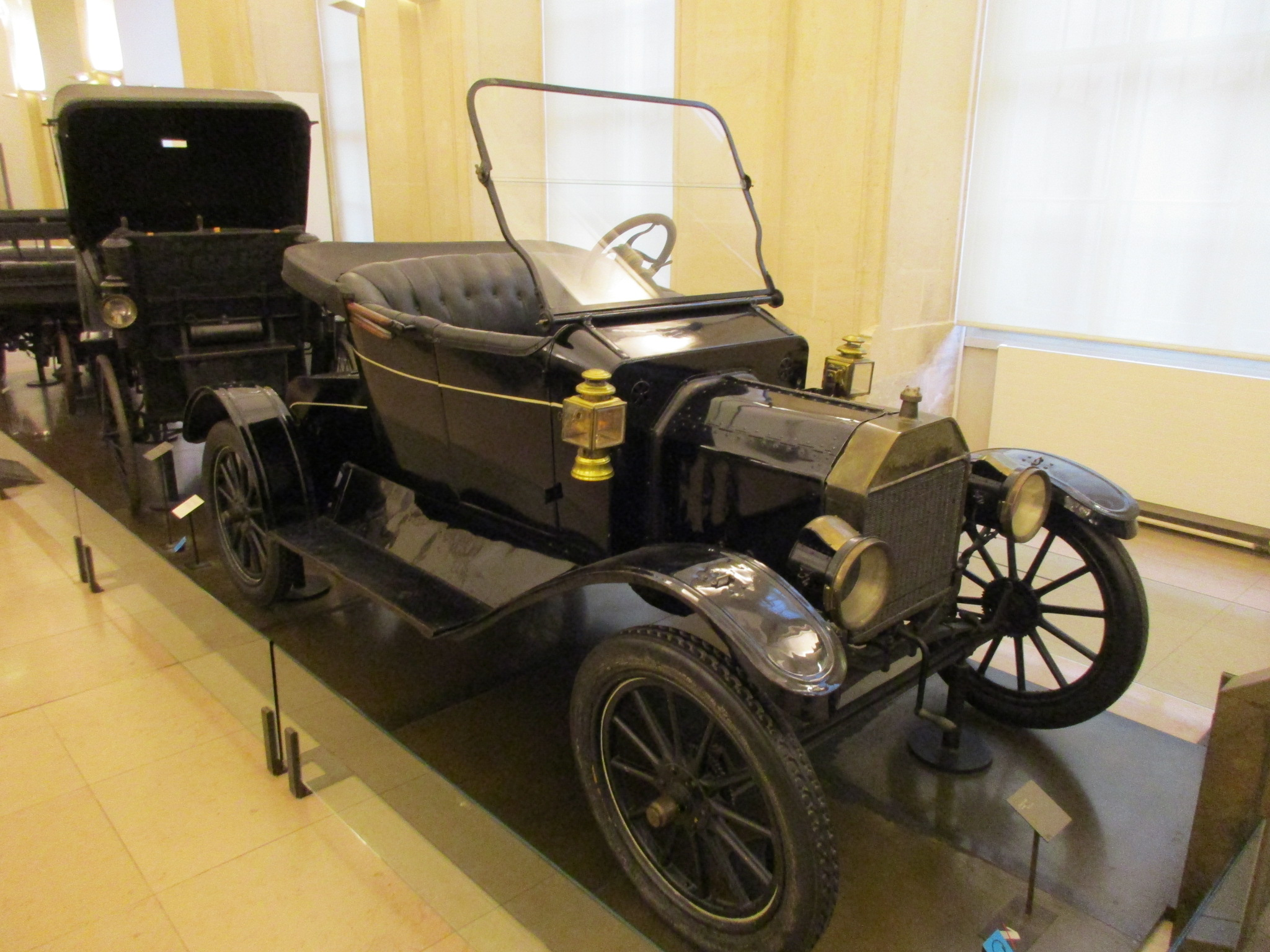
Ford T, 1908

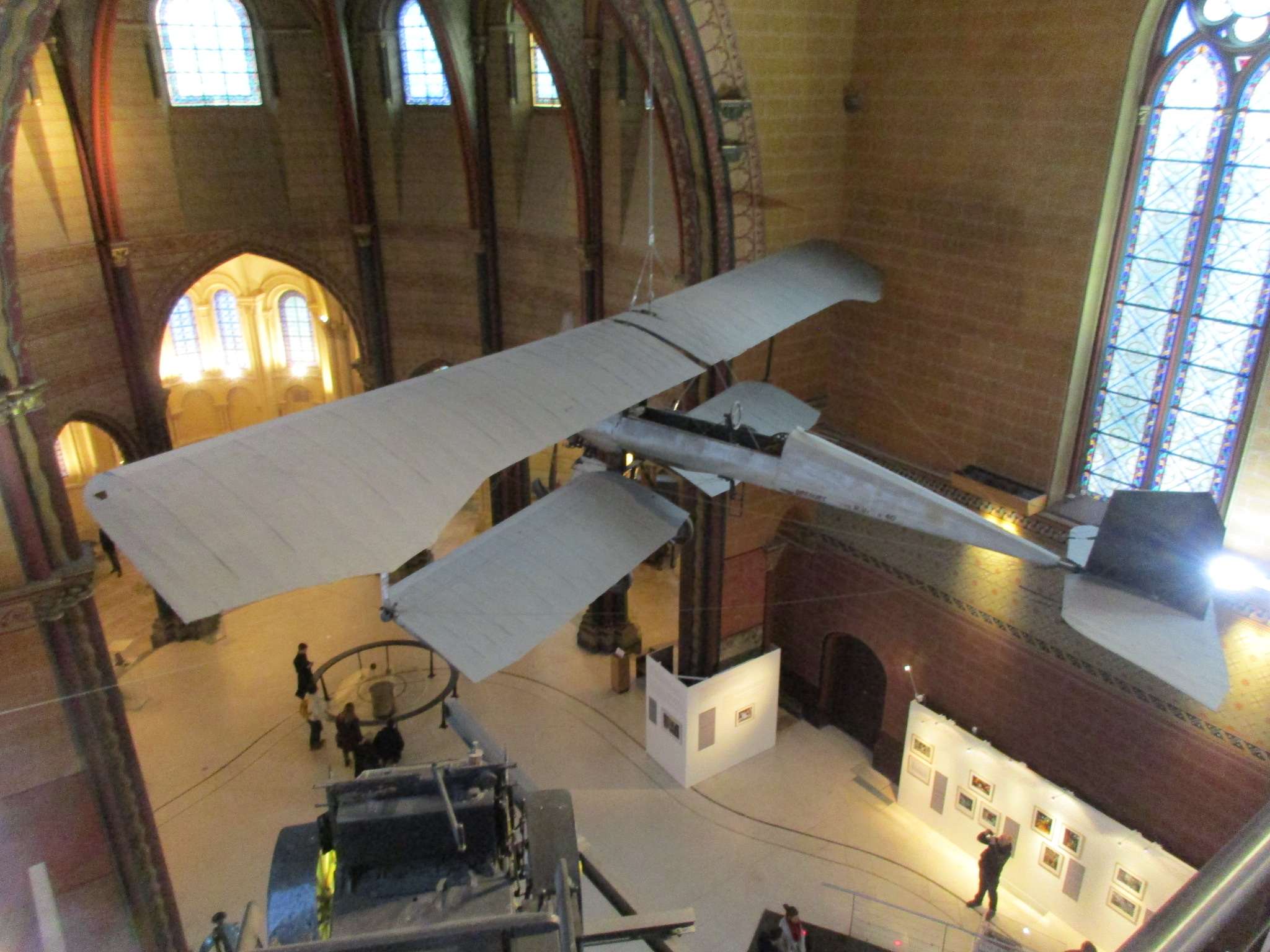
Louis Charles Breguet, 1911

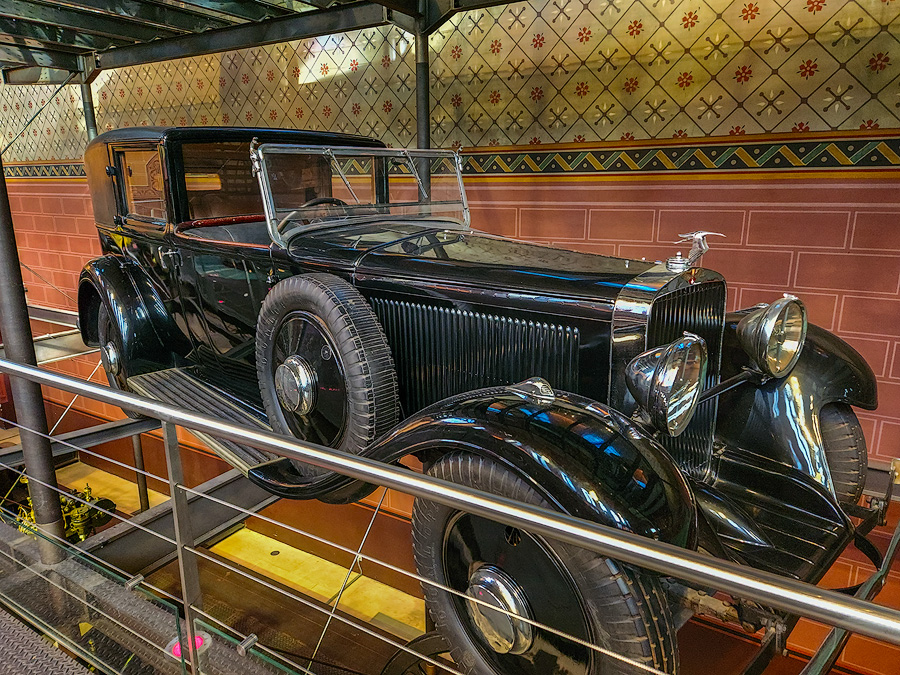
Hispano Suiza 1935

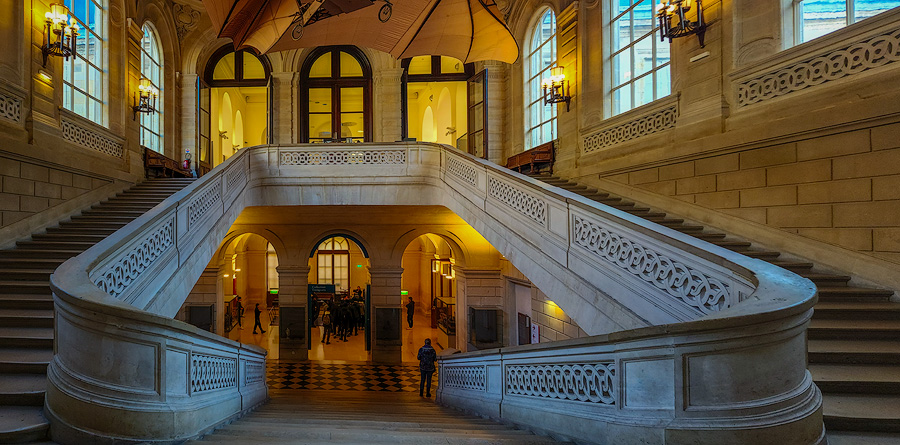
Grand Staircase

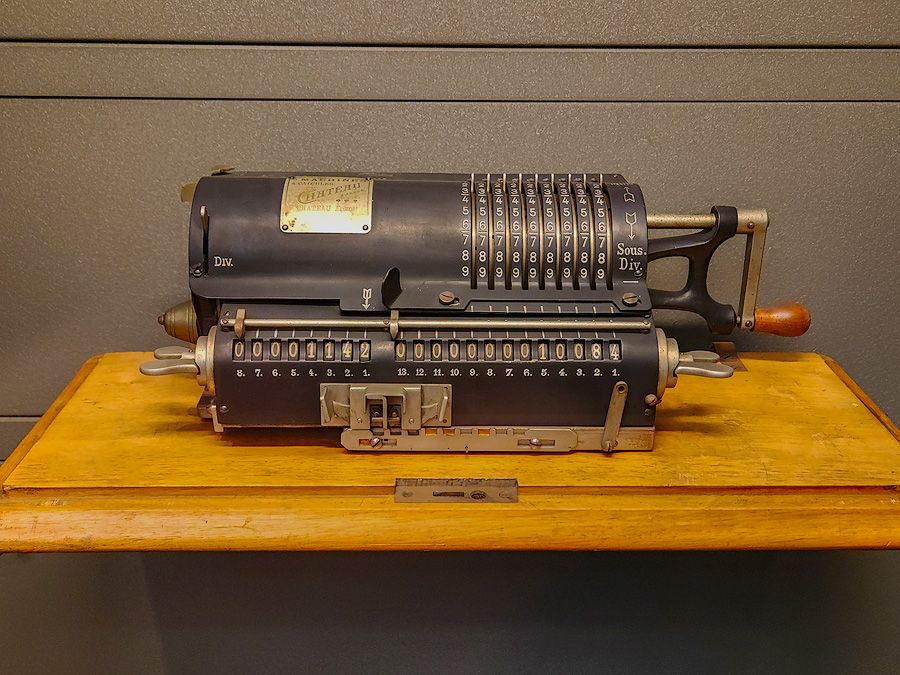
Arithmometer - calculating machine c. 1850

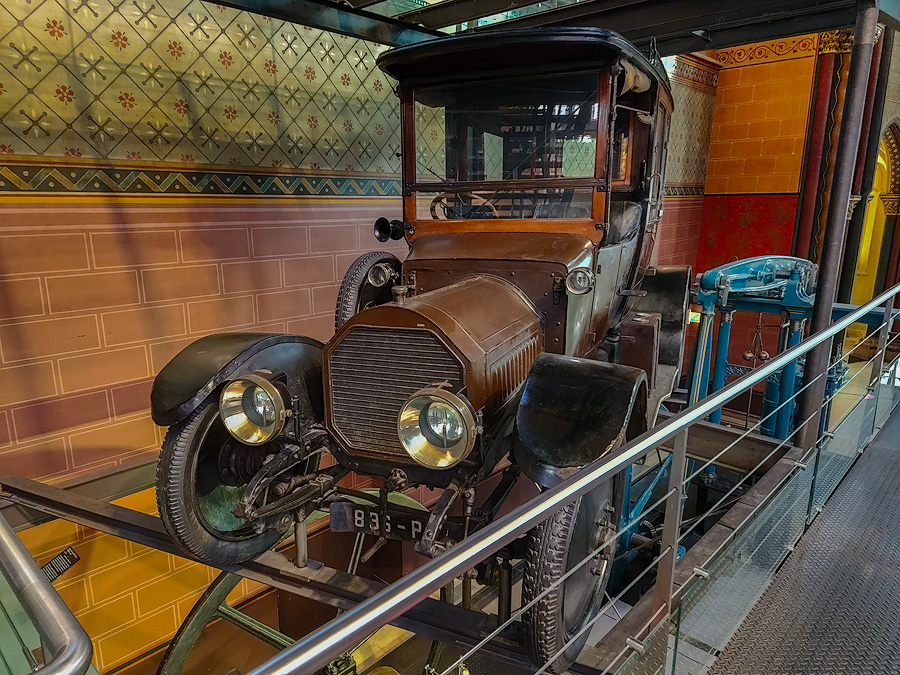
Peugeot 1909 at the Musée des Arts et Métiers

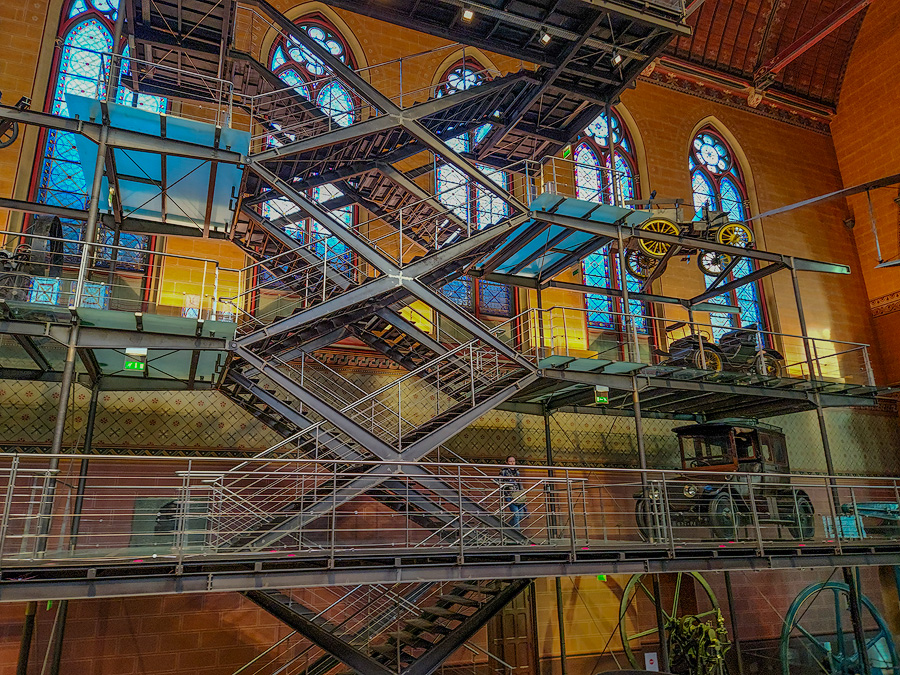
A wall of cars in Musée des Arts et Métiers

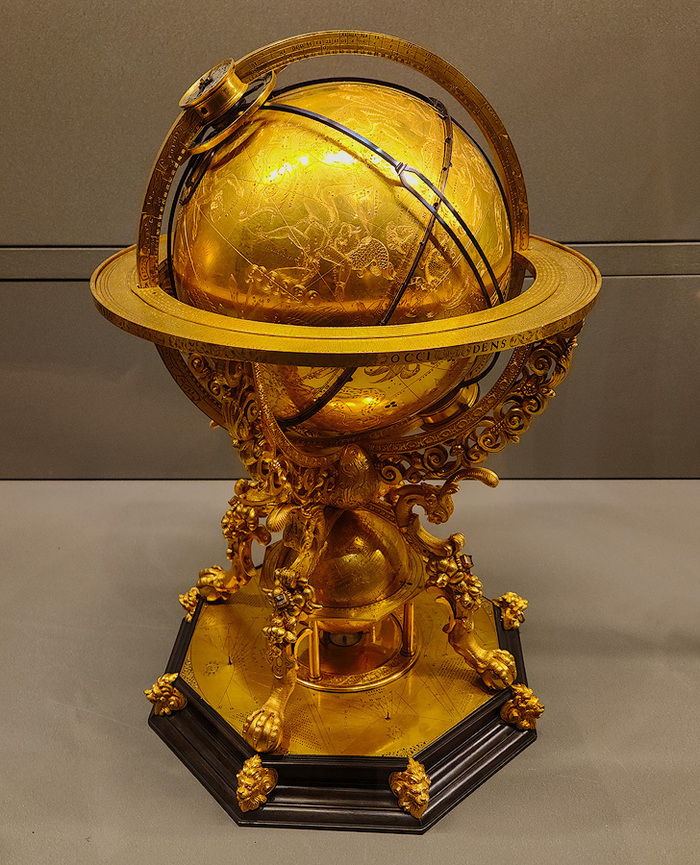
Celestial sphere driven by a clock mechanism, circa 1580

== Cultural references ==
The museum appears in literature as the scene of the climax of the 1988 novel Foucault's Pendulum by Umberto Eco, and is featured in the 2019 documentary film about the Statue of Liberty, Liberty: Mother of Exiles.

== Transportation ==
The museum can be accessed by the Paris Métro station Arts et Métiers. (The museum's entrance is at the corner of Rue Réaumur and Rue Vaucanson.)

== See also ==
- List of museums in Paris
- List of tourist attractions in Paris
- Nicolas-Joseph Cugnot's fardier (a pioneering steam-powered road vehicle) is an exhibit
