= Strengthen the Arm of Liberty Monument =

Strengthen the Arm of Liberty Monument may refer to:

- Strengthen the Arm of Liberty Monument (Pine Bluff, Arkansas)
- Strengthen the Arm of Liberty Monument (Fayetteville, Arkansas)
- Strengthen the Arm of Liberty Monument (Overland Park, Kansas)
- Strengthen the Arm of Liberty Monument (Austin, Texas)

== See also ==
- Strengthen the Arm of Liberty
- Replicas of the Statue of Liberty
