= Strengthen the Arm of Liberty Monument (Pine Bluff, Arkansas) =

- Strengthen the Arm of Liberty Monument - Pine Bluff
- U.S. National Register of Historic Places
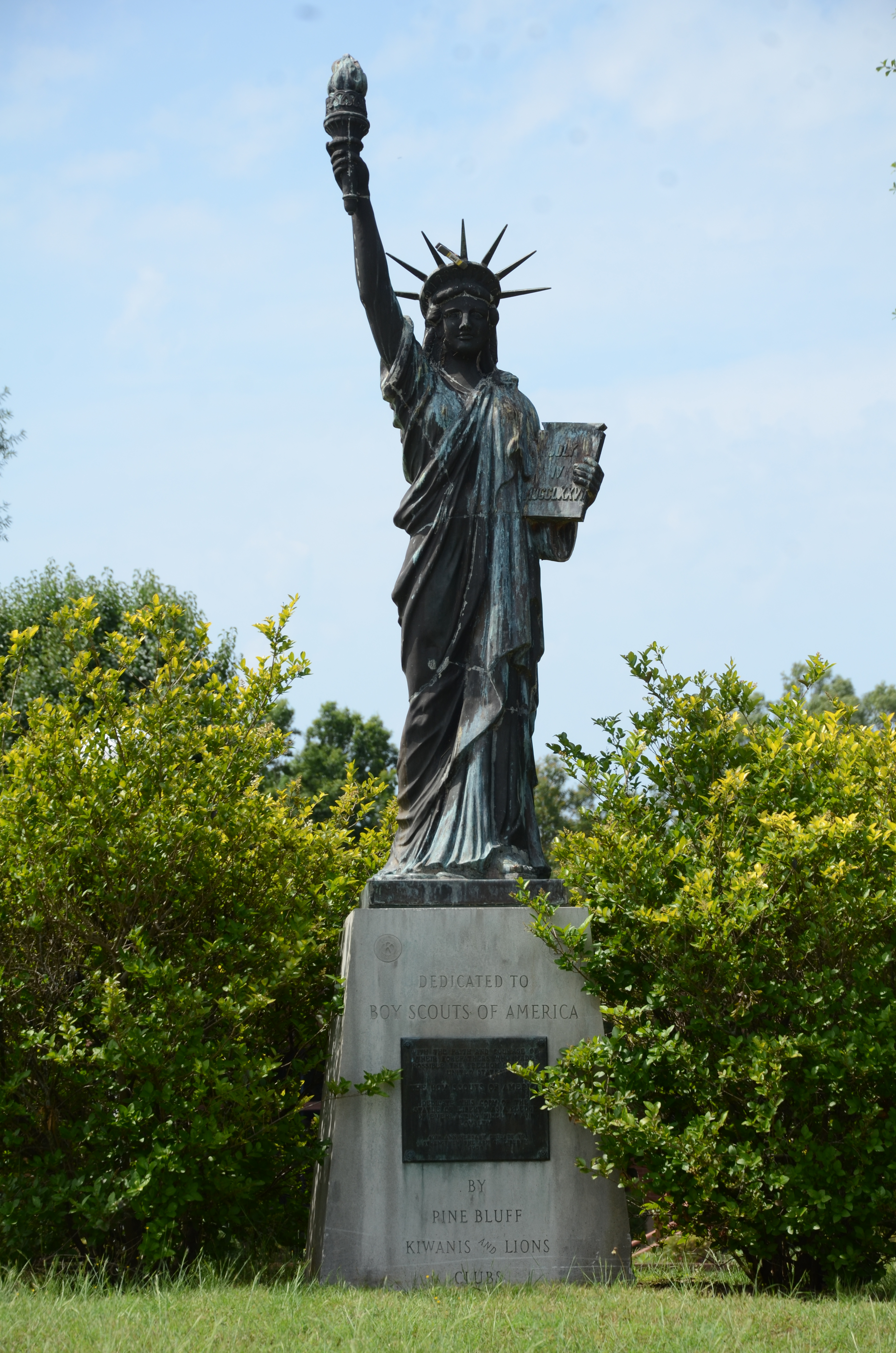

- Location within Arkansas Location within the United States
- Location: 10th Avenue between Georgia and State Streets, Pine Bluff, Arkansas, United States
- Coordinates: 34°13′10.1″N 92°0′3.9″W
- Built: c. 1950
- NRHP reference No.: 00001265
- Added to NRHP: November 1, 2000

The Strengthen the Arm of Liberty Monument is a replica of the Statue of Liberty (Liberty Enlightening the World) in Pine Bluff Memorial Gardens, on the south side of 10th Avenue between Georgia and State Street in Pine Bluff, Arkansas. It was placed by the Boy Scouts of America (BSA) as part of its 1950s era campaign, "Strengthen the Arm of Liberty." The statue is 8 feet (2.4 m) in height, made of copper, and is mounted on concrete base 3.5 feet (1.1 m) tall. The statue faces north, toward the Pine Bluff Civic Center, and there is a bronze commemorative plaque on the north face of the base. It is one of two BSA-placed statues in the state; the other is in Fayetteville.

The statue was listed on the National Register of Historic Places in 2000.

== See also ==
- National Register of Historic Places listings in Jefferson County, Arkansas
- Replicas of the Statue of Liberty
- Scouting memorials
- Scouting museums
