= Strengthen the Arm of Liberty Monument (Overland Park, Kansas) =

Coordinates: 39°01′17.74″N 94°40′24.08″W

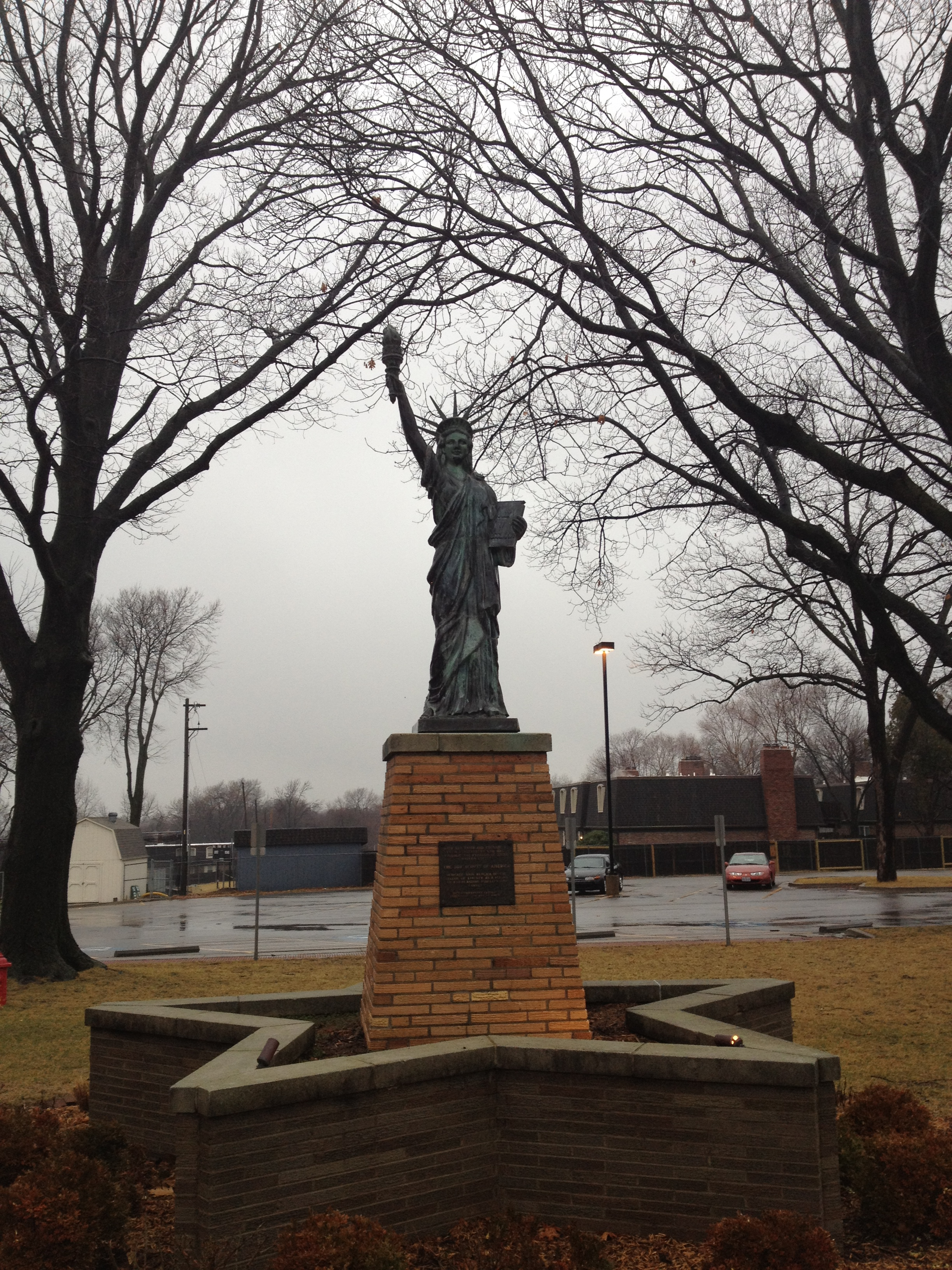
Replica of the Statue of Liberty at Shawnee Mission North High School.

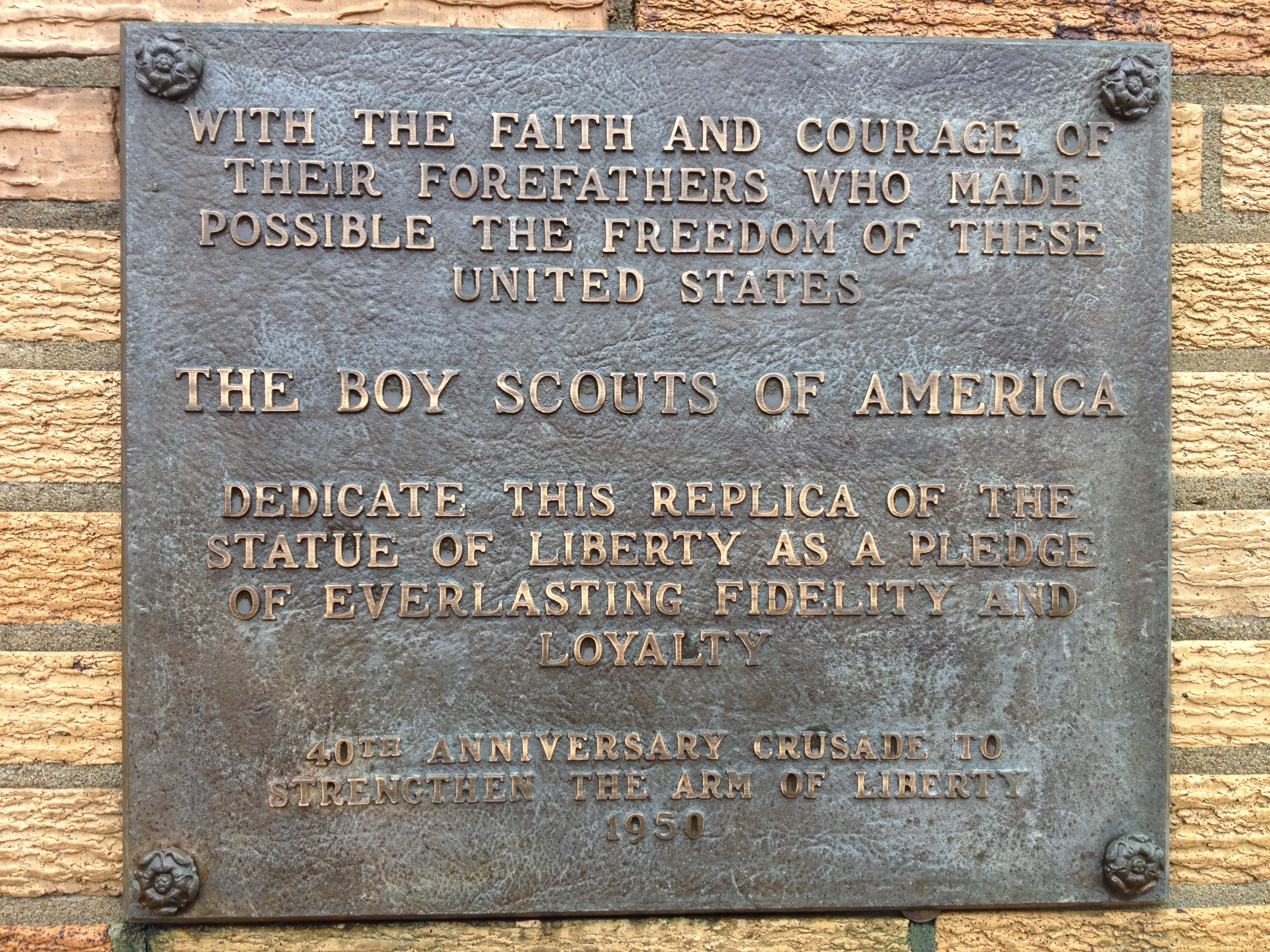
Placard on base of statue

The Strengthen the Arm of Liberty Monument in Overland Park, Kansas, is a replica of the Statue of Liberty (Liberty Enlightening the World). It was placed by the Boy Scouts of America as part of its 1950s era campaign, "Strengthen the Arm of Liberty".

== Background ==
Strengthen the Arm of Liberty was the theme of the Boy Scouts of America's fortieth anniversary celebration in 1950. Approximately 200 BSA Statue of Liberty replicas were installed across the United States. It is located on the west side of Shawnee Mission North High School.

== See also ==
- Scouting museums
- Scouting memorials
