= Strengthen the Arm of Liberty =

Historical event

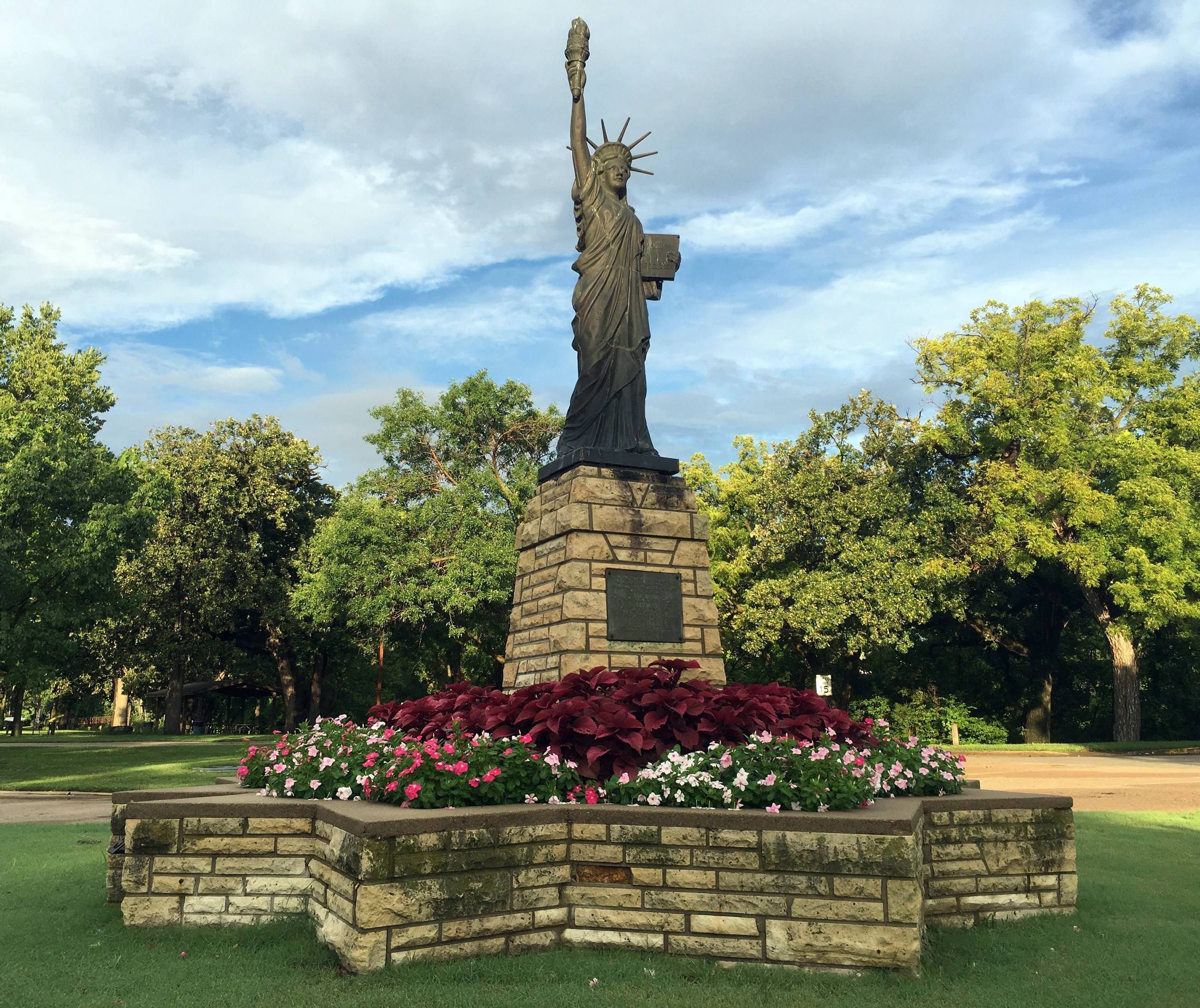
- This Statue of Liberty replica, donated by the Boy Scouts of America (BSA), is located at Oakdale Park in Salina, Kansas.
- Date: 1950
- Venue: Statue of Liberty
- Location: Liberty Island
- Theme: Strengthen the Arm of Liberty
- Cause: 40th anniversary of Boy Scouts of America
- Organized by: Boy Scouts of America

Strengthen the Arm of Liberty is the theme of the Boy Scouts of America's fortieth anniversary celebration in 1950. The campaign was inaugurated in 1949 with a dramatic ceremony held at the base of the Statue of Liberty (Liberty Enlightening the World). Approximately 200 BSA Statue of Liberty replicas were installed across the United States.

== Replicas ==
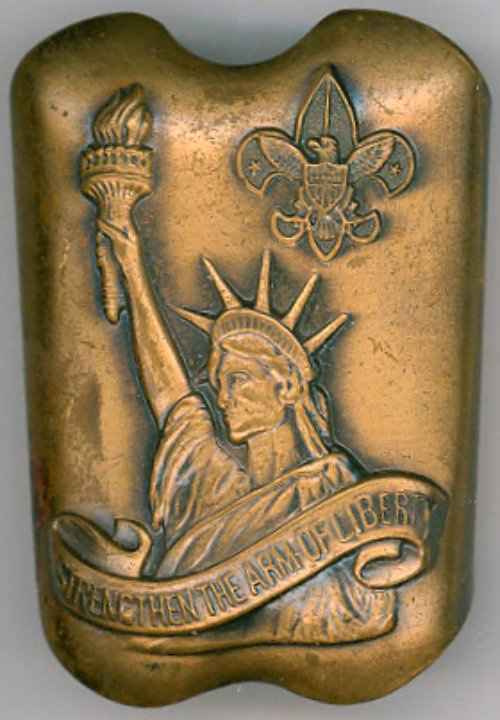
Neckerchief slide

As part of the Strengthening the Arm of Liberty campaign to commemorate the 40th anniversary of the Boy Scouts of America (BSA), hundreds of scale replicas of the Statue of Liberty have been created nationwide. The Statue of Liberty, by French sculptor Frédéric Auguste Bartholdi, bears the classical appearance of the Roman stola, sandals, and facial expression which are derived from Libertas, ancient Rome's goddess of freedom from slavery, oppression, and tyranny. Her raised right foot is on the move. This symbol of Liberty and Freedom is not standing still or at attention in the harbor, but moving forward, as her left foot tramples broken shackles at her feet, in symbolism of the United States's wish to be free from oppression and tyranny.

=== Manufacture ===
Between 1949 and 1952, approximately two hundred 100-inch (2.5 m) replicas of the statue, made of stamped copper, were purchased by Boy Scout troops and donated in 39 states in the U.S. and several of its possessions and territories. The project was the brainchild of Kansas City businessman, J.P. Whitaker, who was then Scout Commissioner of the Kansas City Area Council.

The copper statues were manufactured by Friedley-Voshardt Co. (Chicago, Illinois) and purchased through the Kansas City Boy Scout office. The statues are approximately 8 1/2 feet (2.6 m) tall without the base, constructed of sheet copper, weigh 290 pounds (130 kg), and originally cost US$350 (equivalent to about $4,700 in 2025) plus freight. The mass-produced statues are not meticulously accurate and a conservator noted that "her face isn't as mature as the real Liberty. It's rounder and more like a little girl's."

=== Present ===
Many of these statues have been lost or destroyed, but preservationists have been able to account for about 100 of them, and BSA Troop 101 of Cheyenne, Wyoming has collected photographs of more than 100 of them.

Statues include Birmingham, Alabama, Fayetteville, Arkansas, Pine Bluff, Arkansas, Greeley, Colorado, at the Mississippi riverfront in Burlington, Iowa, at Overland Park, Kansas, at Chimborazo Park in Richmond, Virginia, and Veterans Memorial Park in Waterloo, Iowa.

The copper skins can oxidize, resembling the original, and some have been renovated. The statue in Burlington had been taken from its original position in Dankwardt Park, completely renovated, repaired, and polished, and then placed on a pedestal at the riverfront, where it sits today.

== List of BSA Statue of Liberty replicas ==
The following is a list of locations of the replica statues as of 2016.

=== Alabama ===
- Birmingham - Linn Park, located on the west side of the Jefferson County Courthouse building facing Linn Park; the replica at Liberty Park is not a BSA piece^{[b]}

=== Arkansas ===
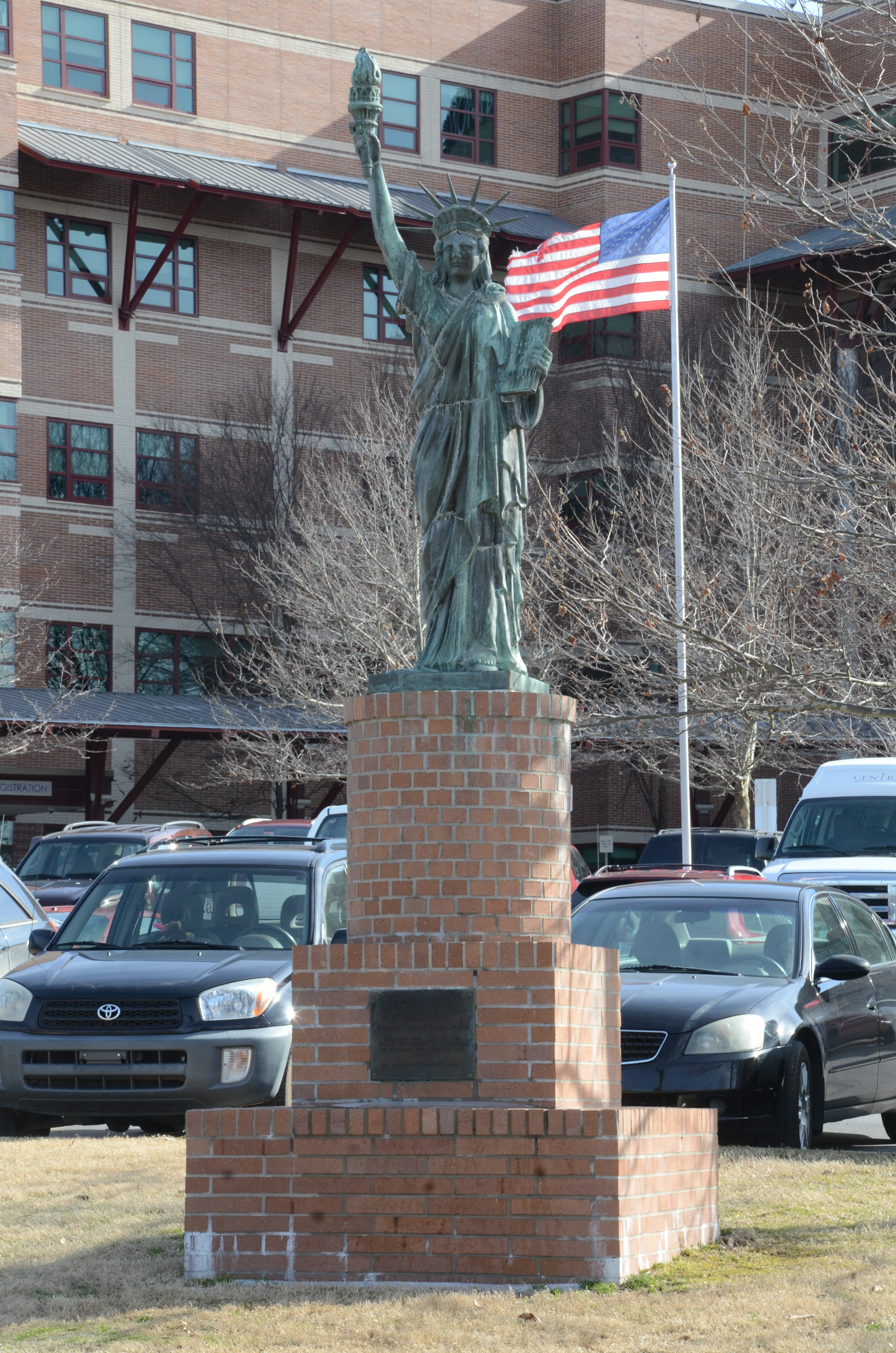
Fayetteville, Arkansas

- Fayetteville, Washington Regional Medical Center, North Hills Blvd^{[b]}
- Pine Bluff, 10th Avenue between Georgia & State Streets on Esplanade opposite South Side Civic Center^{[b]}
- Sherwood, Amy Sanders Branch Library, 31 Shelby Road

=== California ===
- Bellflower, John Simms Park, 16601 South Clark Avenue^{[b]}

=== Colorado ===
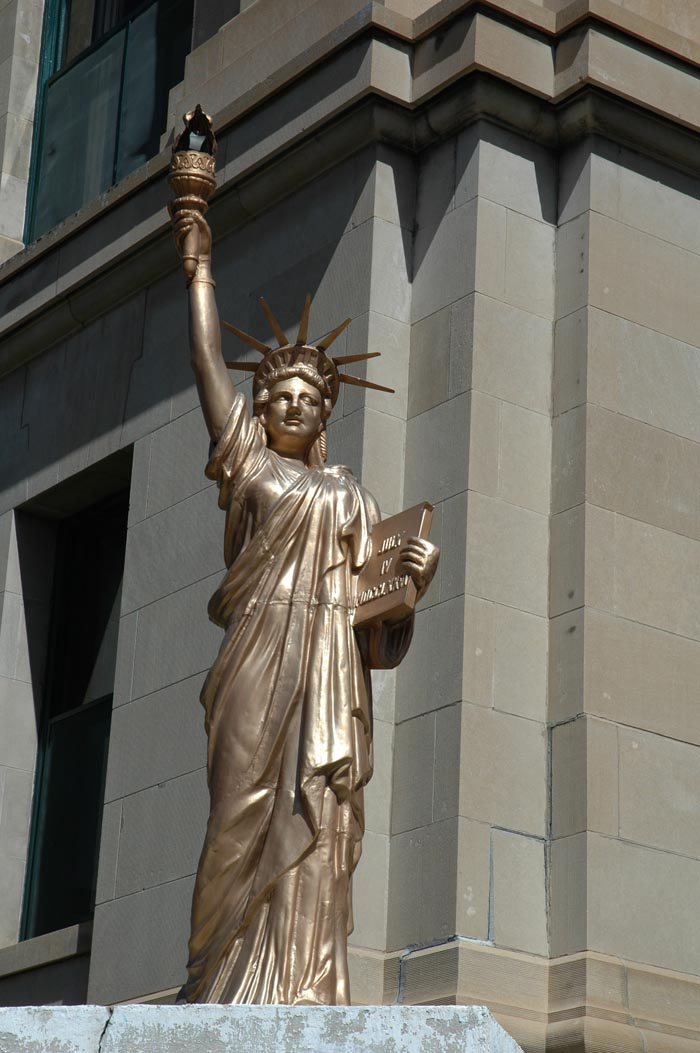
Trinidad, Colorado

- Colorado Springs, Old City Hall, 107 North Nevada Avenue^{[b]}
- Denver, Missing
- Estes Park, Estes Park Elementary School, 1505 Brodie Ave. ^{[b]}
- Fort Collins, 1526 City Park Dr. ^{[b]}
- Greeley, Corner of 9th Street and 9th Avenue, 901 N 9th Ave. ^{[b]}
- Gunnison, Leslie J. Savage Library at Western State College of Colorado, 600 N. Adams, north wall of the main floor. Originally in Crawford^{[b]}
- Johnstown, Letford Elementary School, 1099 S Jay Ave ^{[b]}
- Kremmling, Corner of Park St and 2nd St, outside the Kremmling Area Chamber of Commerce
- La Junta, City Park, 10th St. and Colorado Avenue, 1010 Colorado Ave ^{[b]}
- Longmont, Roosevelt Park, Coffman Street and Longs Peak Avenue, 708 Coffman St. ^{[b]}
- Loveland, Lakeside Park, 399 E Eisenhower Blvd ^{[b]}
- Pueblo, Pueblo County Courthouse, 10th Street^{[b]}
- Sterling, Logan County Courthouse, off Main St^{[b]}
- Trinidad, County Courthouse, First Street and Maple Street^{[b]}
- Walsh, Corner of Santa Fe st and N Neveen St^{[b]}
- Ward, Camp Tahosa^{[b]}

=== Florida ===
- Orlando, Magnolia and Orange Avenue^{[a]}
- Quincy, Wallwood Scout Reservation, 23 Wallwood BSA Drive^{[b]}

=== Georgia ===
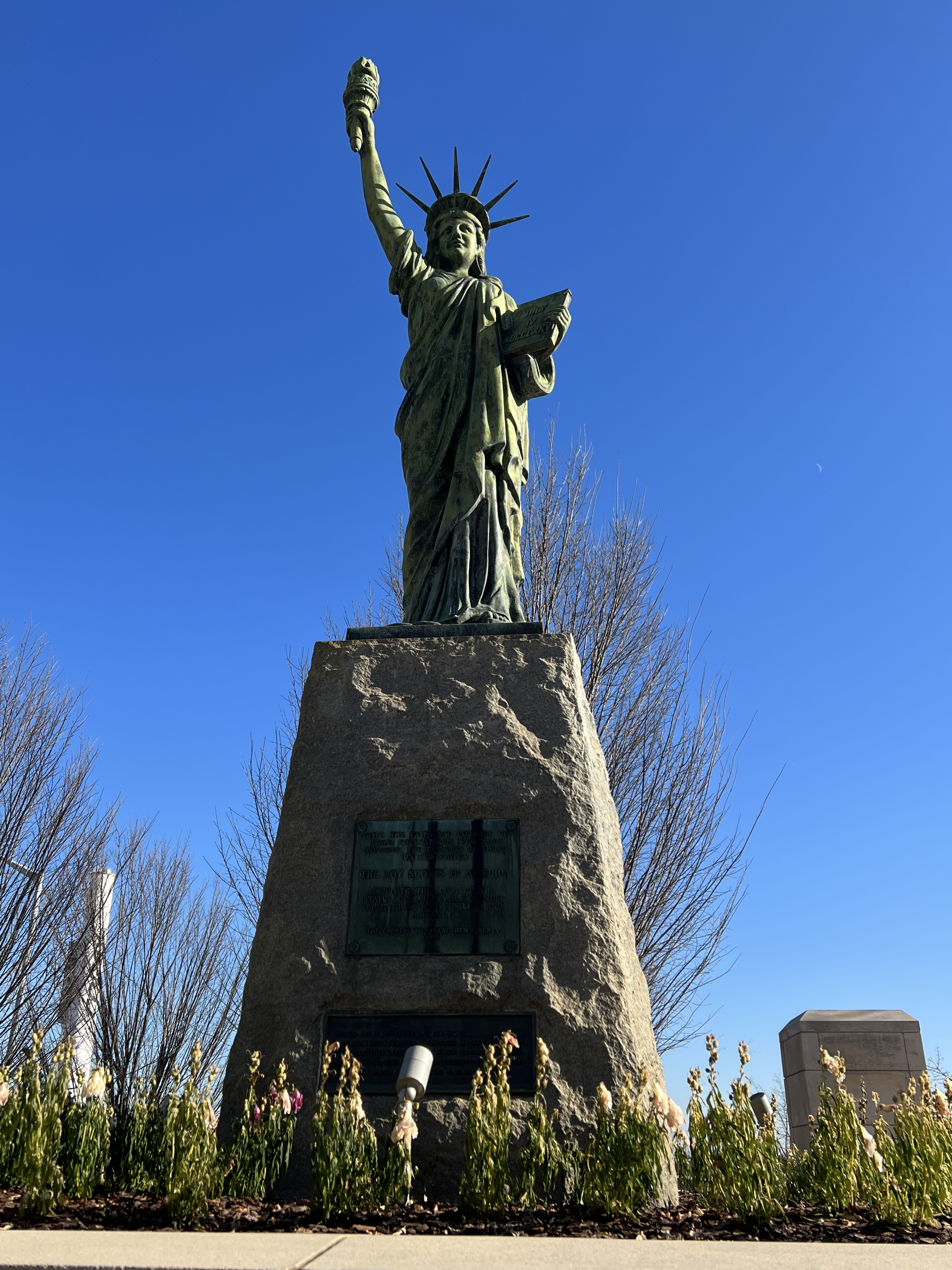
Atlanta, Georgia

- Atlanta, Georgia State Capitol, Across from northeast corner of Capitol grounds. Corner of Capitol Avenue SW and Martin Luther King Drive at the corner of Liberty Plaza.^{[a]}
- Rome, at Camp Sidney Dew^{[b]}

=== Guam ===
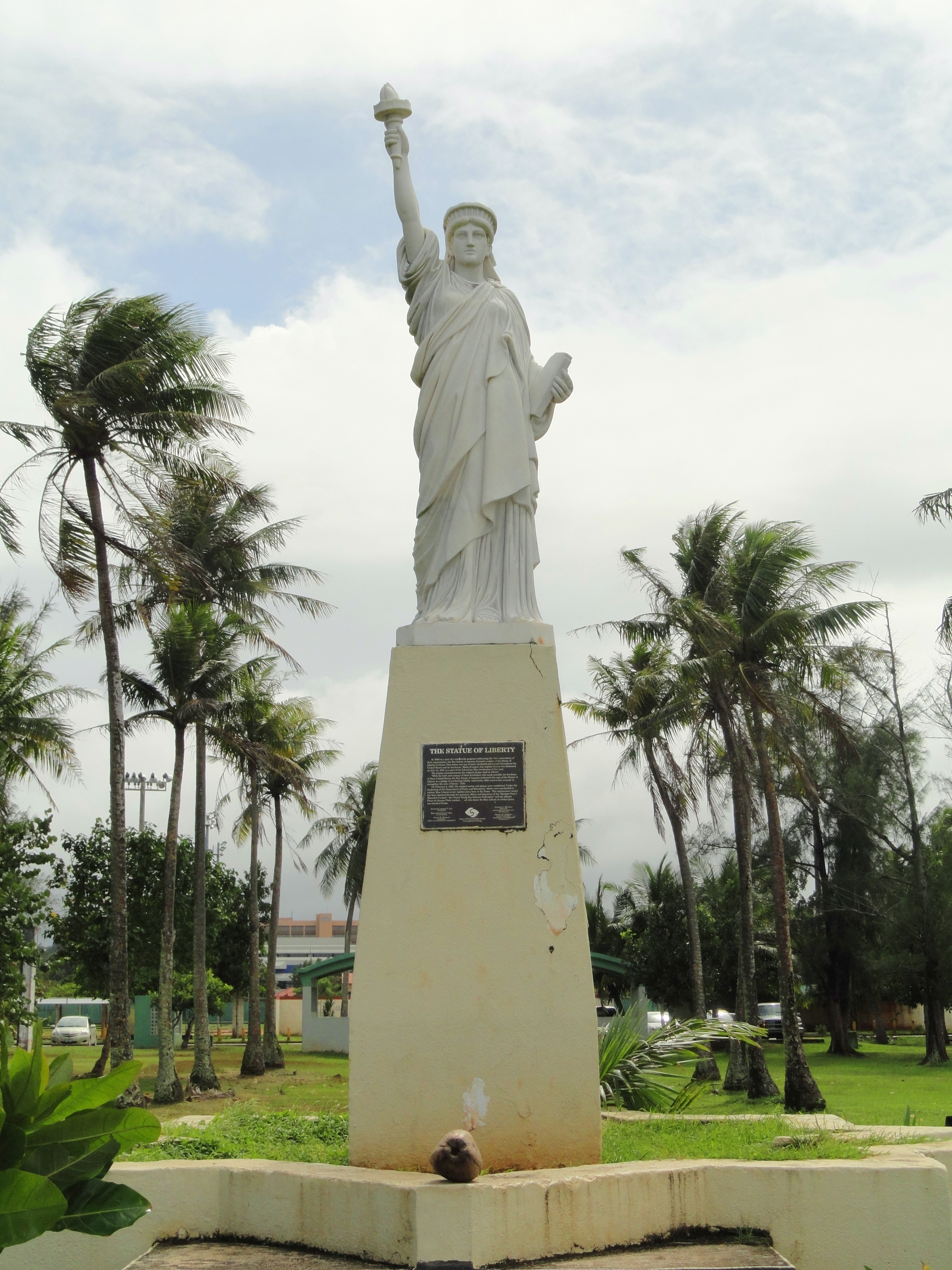
Guam

- Hagatna Harbor, Guam^{[a]}

=== Idaho ===
- Caldwell, Caldwell Memorial Park, Near Grant Street^{[b]}

=== Illinois ===
- London Mills, Village Veteran Park^{[b]}
- Warsaw, Rolston Park^{[a]}
- Benton in front of the library^{[b]}
- Oregon Camp Lowden, BSA^{[b]}

=== Indiana ===
- Dupont, Camp Louis Ernst, BSA, 75 feet west of Indiana SR 7^{[b]}
- Gary, 401 Broadway, City Hall^{[a]}
- Madison, Jefferson County Courthouse, Northwest corner^{[b]}
- Peru, Miami County Courthouse, Courthouse square, south side^{[b]}
- Plymouth, Marshall County Commissioners, Marshall County Courthouse^{[b]}
- South Bend, Old Courthouse, 101 South Main Street^{[b]}

=== Iowa ===
- Bloomfield, Courthouse^{[b]}
- Burlington, on the banks of the Mississippi River^{[b]}
- Cedar Falls, Veterans Memorial Park
- Cedar Rapids, 1st Ave Bridge, south tip of Ellis Island^{[b]}
- Clarence, City Park^{[b]}
- Clinton, Eagle Point Park^{[b]}
- Decorah, Decorah Courthouse, 201 West Main^{[b]}
- Des Moines, Iowa State Capitol, East 12th Street^{[b]}
- Dubuque, Between West 6th and 7th^{[a]}
- Fairfield, in front of Jefferson County Courthouse^{[b]}
- Fort Madison, Central Park, Corner of 9th Street & Ave F
- Grundy Center, Grundy Courthouse Square^{[b]}
- Independence, Independence Courthouse, 331 1st Street East^{[b]}
- Iowa City, Campus of City High School
- Leon, Courthouse, North Main Street, town square^{[b]}
- Mason City, Central Park^{[b]}
- Manly, Central Park^{[b]}
- Mount Pleasant, North West Corner of the Henry County Court House^{[b]}
- Muscatine, in front of City Hall, 215 Sycamore Street^{[b]}
- Sioux City, Sioux City Municipal Auditorium^{[b]}
- Waterloo, Soldiers and Sailors Park^{[b]}
- Waverly, Bremer County Courthouse, Highway 3, Waverly and Bremer Avenue^{[b]}
- West Liberty, in front of the City Hall^{[b]}
- West Point, Center of Town Square
- Woodbine, in front of the library^{[b]}

=== Kansas ===
- Coffeyville, in front of the high school^{[b]}
- Colby, Fike Park, Corner of Franklin and East 8th Street^{[b]}
- Eldorado, Butler County Historical Courthouse^{[a]}
- Garden City, Finney County Courthouse, 8th Street side^{[b]}
- Garnett, Courthouse Square^{[b]}
- Harlan, Roadside Park, US 281, 5 miles from Harlan^{[a]}
- Hays, Hays Public Library, 1205 Main^{[b]}
- Hillsboro, Hillsboro Memorial Park, Birch Street^{[b]}
- Independence, Penn and Locust^{[b]}
- Kingman, Kingman Elementary and Junior High School, North Main Street^{[b]}
- La Crosse, La Crosse City Park, South Main Street^{[b]}
- Leavenworth, City Hall, Lawn, northeast corner of 5th and Shawnee^{[b]}
- Lebanon, Kansas Geographical center of the lower 48 states^{[b]}
- Liberal, Liberal Memorial Library, 519 North Kansas^{[b]}
- Medicine Lodge, Medicine Lodge Grade School, 320 North Walnut, Northwest corner^{[b]}
- Overland Park, Shawnee Mission North High School, 7401 Johnson Drive^{[b]}
- Parsons, Parsons Middle School, Southwest corner, 28th and Main^{[b]}
- Pratt, Gateway Park, Corner of East First and Stout^{[b]}
- Russell, Lincoln Park, Corner of 4th and Lincoln Streets^{[b]}
- St. John, City Park Square, Northeast corner, 4th and Broadway^{[b]}
- Salina, Oakdale Park, 320 East Ash^{[b]}
- Smith County, located in small park overlooking the North Fork of the Solomon River Valley just west of U.S. 281
- Topeka, Kansas State Capitol grounds^{[b]}
- Troy, Doniphan County Courthouse, Southwest grounds^{[b]}
- Washington, Washington County Courthouse, C Street and 3rd^{[b]}
- Wichita, Roosevelt Middle School, 2100 East Douglas^{[b]}

=== Kentucky ===
- Leitchfield, Grayson County Courthouse^{[b]}

=== Maryland ===
- North East, Maryland, Rodney Scout Reservation, Brown Lodge^{[b]}

=== Massachusetts ===
- Fall River, John F. Kennedy Park, Corner of Bradford and Broadway Avenue^{[b]}
- Lawrence, Lawrence Public Library^{[b]}

=== Michigan ===
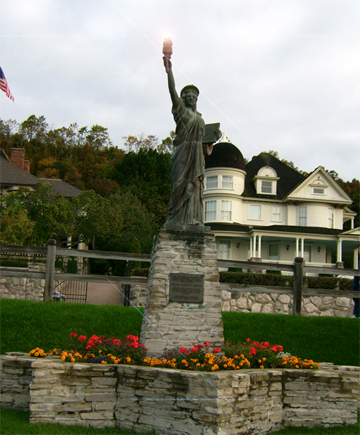
This Statue of Liberty replica, donated by the Boy Scouts of America (BSA), is located at Haldimand Bay, Mackinac Island, Michigan.

- Mackinac Island, Mackinac Island Marina^{[a]}

=== Minnesota ===
- Hibbing, City Hall, 401 East 21st Street^{[b]}
- Alexandria, by Lake Agnes

=== Mississippi ===
- Columbus, located on Main Street^{[a]}

=== Missouri ===
- Boonville, Cooper County Courthouse, Main Street, In front of Courthouse^{[a]}
- Butler, Butler Grade School^{[b]}
- Cape Girardeau, Intersection of Broadway and West End Boulevard^{[b]}
- Columbia, Formerly located Municipal Building, 505 West Broadway (1950–73)^{[b]}
- Concordia, Central Park, Seventh Street at Gordon Street^{[a]}
- Jefferson City, Missouri State Capitol, Capitol and Jefferson Streets, west of Department of Highway and Transportation building^{[b]}
- Kansas City, Meyer Boulevard and Prospect Avenue^{[a]}
- Kansas City, North Kansas City High School, Circular promenade near Iron, Howell, and East 23rd Streets^{[b]}
- Lamar, SE corner of Courthouse lawn^{[b]}
- Lexington, County Court House, 1001 Main Street^{[b]}
- Liberty, Franklin Elementary School, 201 West Mill Street^{[b]}
- Malden, Intersection of Business Highway 25 and Downing Street^{[b]}
- Marshall, Indian Foothills Park, North entrance^{[b]}
- Memphis, County Courthouse, Corner of Monroe and Market Streets^{[b]}
- Mexico, Audrain County Courthouse^{[b]}
- North Kansas City, North Kansas City High School, Circular promenade near Iron, Howell, and East 23rd Streets^{[b]}
- Memphis, Scotland County Courthouse, Corner of Monroe and Market Streets^{[b]}
- Osceola, H. Roe Bartle Scout Reservation^{[b]}
- St. Joseph, Smith Park, Francis between 11th and 12th^{[b]}
- Salisbury, City Park^{[b]}
- Sedalia, Pettis County Courthouse^{[b]}
- Silva, Lewallen Scout Camp^{[b]}
- Slater, SE corner of Elm St.^{[b]}
- Springfield, in front of County Courthouse^{[b]}

=== Montana ===
- Great Falls, Gibson Park, Park Drive and 2nd Avenue North^{[b]}
- Lewistown, Prospect and Main Streets^{[b]}

=== Nebraska ===
- Alma, in front of the courthouse
- Beatrice, in front of the Gage County Museum
- Chadron, War Memorial Park Complex, 9th & Shelton Streets
- Columbus, Pawnee Park, 33rd Avenue^{[b]}
- Falls City, Court House, 17th and Stone St.^{[b]}
- Fremont, Masonic Park, 77 and Highway 30^{[b]}
- Gering, U and 10th^{[b]}
- Grand Island, Pier Park^{[b]}
- Hastings, 12th Street^{[b]}
- Lincoln, Antelope Park^{[b]}
- Norfolk, Central Park, 510 Pasewalk Avenue^{[b]}
- Scottsbluff, 10th and North 27th Street^{[b]}
- David City, City park main entrance. Hwy 15
- North Platte, Lincoln County Courthouse

=== New York ===
- Amsterdam NY Across from 262 E. Main St, in Health Peace Friendship Square.
- Hudson, Intersection of Columbia and Green Street^{[b]}
- Le Roy, Wolcott Street, Opposite Woodward Memorial Library^{[b]}
- Niagara Falls, Rainbow Bridge Plaza^{[b]}
- Oneonta, Neawha Park^{[b]}
- Schenectady, Intersection of Erie Boulevard and Union Street^{[a]}
- Utica, Median between Elm Street and Pleasant Street^{[b]}

=== North Carolina ===
- Wilmington, Thalian Hall, Front lawn, northeast corner of Third and Princess Streets

=== North Dakota ===
- Fargo, Main and 2nd Streets^{[b]}

=== Ohio ===
Camp Miakonda, Sylvania(Toledo)

=== Oklahoma ===
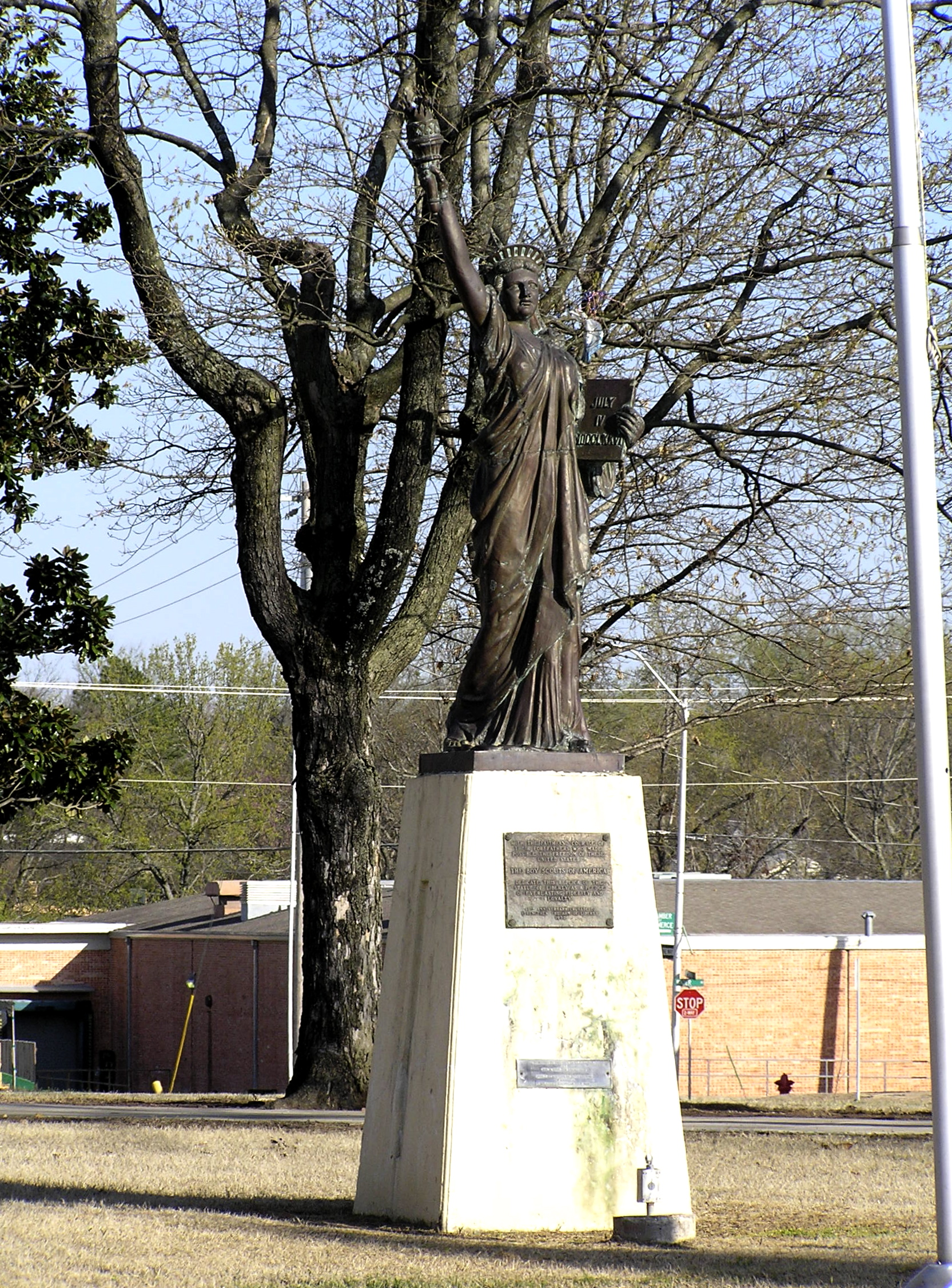
Lady Liberty of Tahlequah, one of the Strengthen the Arm of Liberty statues still extant

- Blackwell, Memorial Swimming Pool, 1400 South Main Street
- Chickasha, Shannon Springs Park, part the Grady County Veterans Memorial, southeast of W Montana Ave and S 12th Street
- Cushing, City Park, 900 block of South Little Street
- Edmond, Edmond Historical Society and Museum, 431 South Boulevard
- Enid, Garfield County Courthouse, Grand and Broadway Streets
- Lindsay, north Main St.
- Miami, Ottawa County Courthouse, corner of A Street and Central S.E.
- Muskogee, Spaulding Park, Spaulding Park Lake
- Oklahoma City, Oklahoma County Courthouse, near corner of Park and Hudson (Statue of Liberty)
- Tahlequah, Cherokee Nation Capitol, corner of Keetoowah and Muskogee
- Tulsa, Northwest corner of the Sidney Lanier grade school property, located on Harvard Avenue between 17th and 19th streets
- Wewoka, Seminole County Courthouse, 100 block of Wewoka Avenue

=== Oregon ===
- Medford, corner of South Oakdale Avenue and West 8th Street^{[b]}

=== Pennsylvania ===
- Berwick, Borough Hall, Market Street^{[a]}
- Bloomsburg, Bloomsburg Memorial Elementary School, West 5th and South Market Streets^{[b]}
- Ellwood City, Lincoln High School, 5th and Crescent Avenue^{[b]}
- New Castle, Owen Penfield Fox Park, Mill and Grove Streets^{[a]}
- York, Kiwanis Park, North Newberry Street and Parkway Boulevard, on island in lake^{[b]}

=== South Carolina ===
- Columbia, Realtors Park, Intersection of Barnwell, Blossom and Devine Streets^{[b]}

=== Texas ===
- Big Spring, Texas, City Hall, Southwest corner of Third & Nolan Street^{[a]}
- Dallas, Fair Park, North side of Hall of State
- Midland, Midland County Courthouse, 200 West Wall Street^{[a]}
- Port Arthur, Lions Park^{[a]}
- Statue of Liberty Replica Monument, Texas State Capitol, Austin, Texas^{[b]}

=== Virginia ===
- Richmond, Chimborazo Park^{[b]}

=== Washington ===
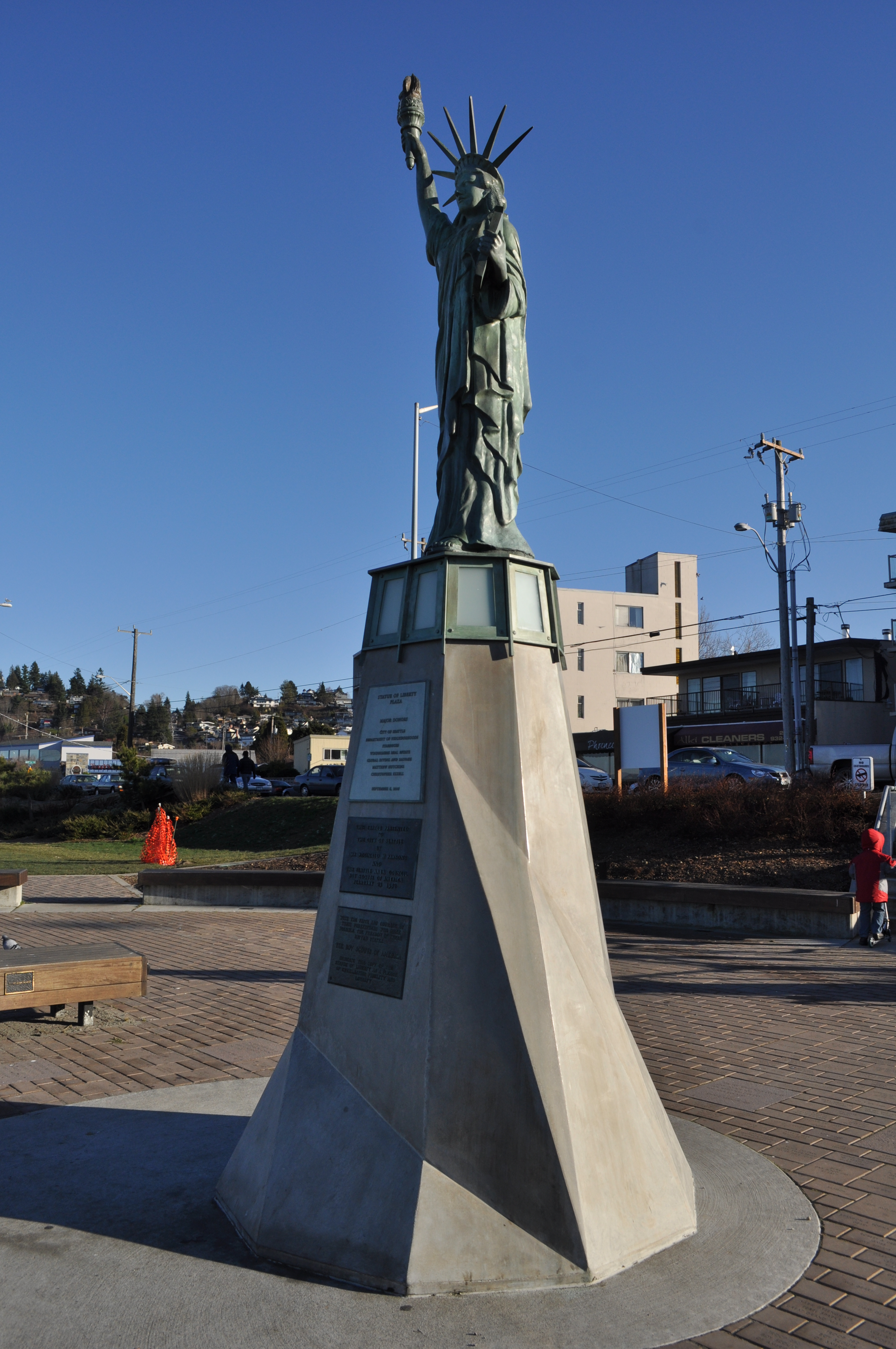
Seattle

- Statue of Liberty (Seattle), Alki Point ^{[a]}

=== West Virginia ===
- Fairmont, Veterans of Foreign Wars Post 629, 802 Fairmont Ave

=== Wisconsin ===
- Kenosha, inside Kenosha History museum on Simmon's Island^{[a]}
- Madison, Warner Park, Corner of Northport and Sherman Avenue^{[b]}

=== Wyoming ===
- Torrington, Goshen County Courthouse, N.E. corner of 21st Avenue and East A Street^{[b]}
- Wheatland, Platte County Courthouse, 800 9th Street^{[b]}
- Cheyenne, Lions Park ^{[b]}

== Artifacts ==
A Strengthen the Arm of Liberty brass pin was produced for uniform and civilian wear. The pin is in the shape of the Statue of Liberty superimposed on a fleur de lis. The Robbins Company, which made BSA's Eagle medals for many years, made these pins and the winged "R" hallmark is prominently displayed on the reverse. A commemorative neckerchief slide was made for Boy Scouts and for the Cub Scouts.

== See also ==
- Replicas of the Statue of Liberty
- Scouting museums
- Scouting memorials
