= Statue of Liberty (Oklahoma City) =

Statue in Oklahoma City, Oklahoma, U.S.

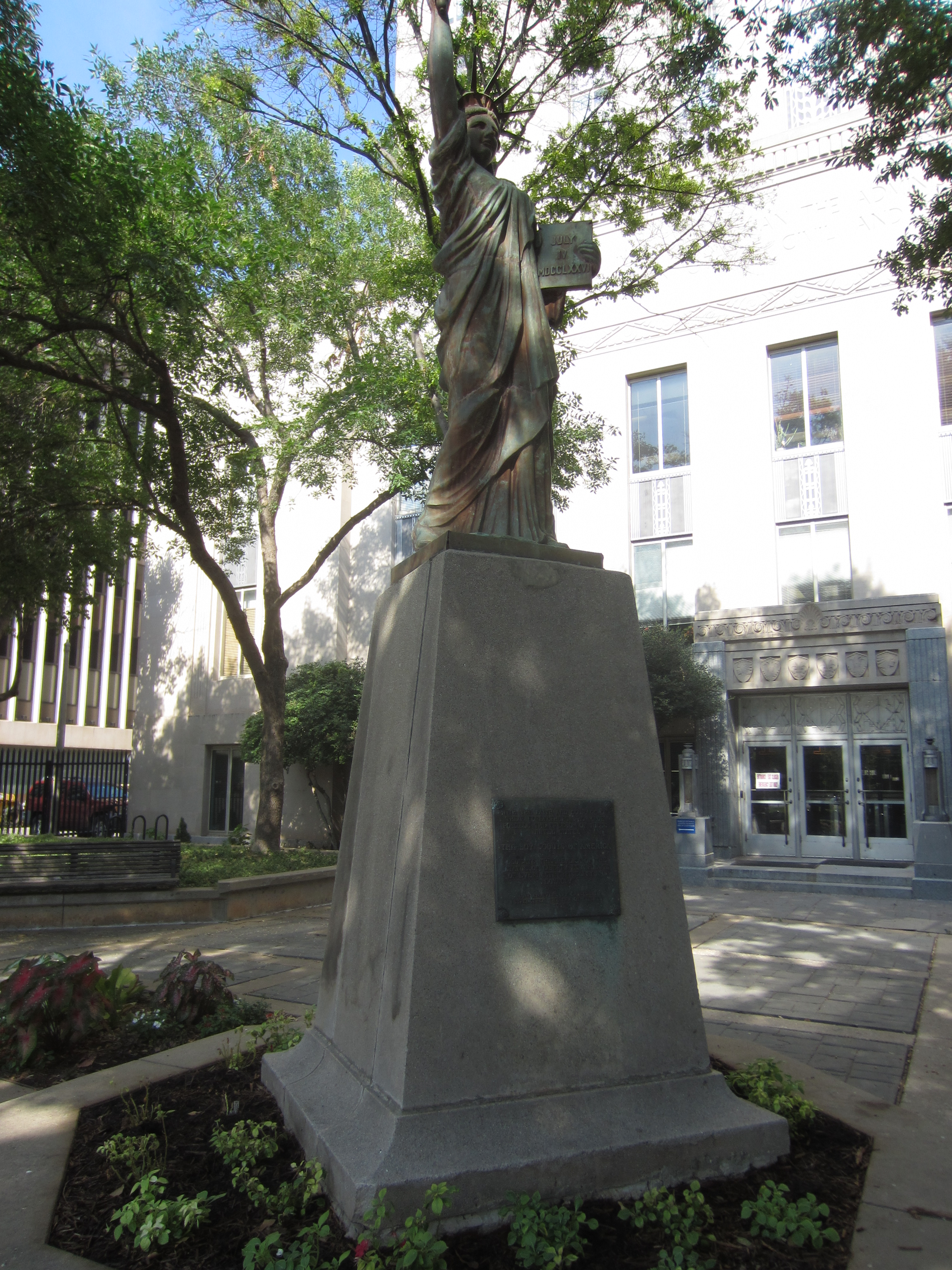
- The statue in 2019
- Year: 1950
- Medium: Metal sculpture
- Subject: Statue of Liberty
- Location: Oklahoma City, Oklahoma; 35.469207°N 97.519248°W

The Statue of Liberty is a replica of New York City's Statue of Liberty in the U.S. state of Oklahoma and its city is installed outside the Oklahoma County Courthouse. It was made as part of the Strengthen the Arm of Liberty campaign.

== Background ==
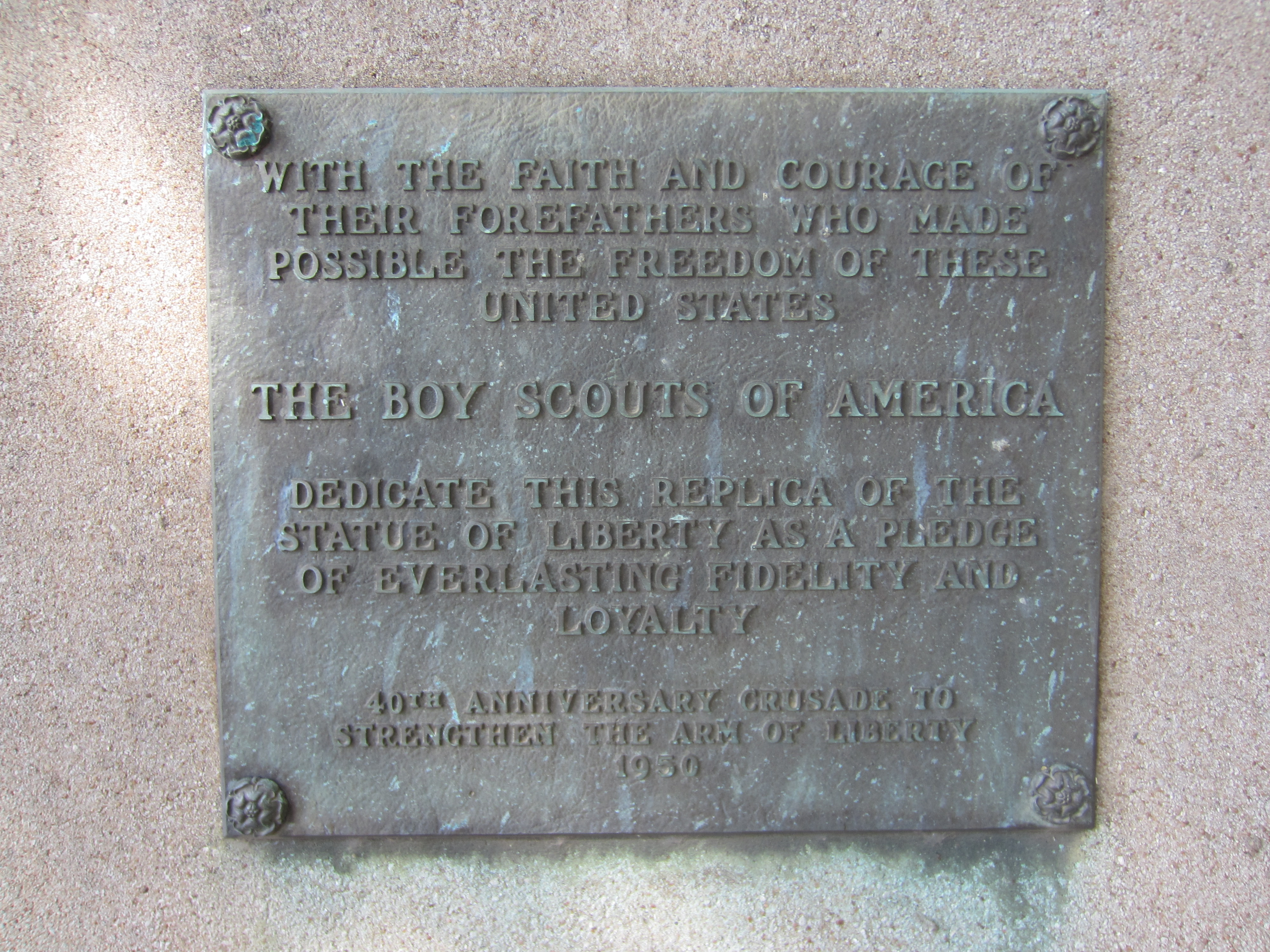
Plaque for the statue, 2019

The statue was dedicated in 1950 as one of approximately 200 replicas installed throughout the United States to commemorate the fortieth anniversary of the establishment of Boy Scouts of America. It was surveyed as part of the Smithsonian Institution's "Save Outdoor Sculpture!" program in 1994.

The replica of the Statue of Liberty (Liberty Enlightening the World) is an allegorical representation of Liberty. The female figure is shown wearing a crown and robes, and holding a torch and a book or tablet. The metal sculpture measures approximately 7 ft. 4 in. x 1 ft. 10 in. x 1 ft. 10 in., and rests on a pedestal and octagonal concrete base that measures approximately 5 ft. 4 in. x 3 ft. 2 in. x 2 ft. 8 in. A plaque on the base has the inscription:

WITH THE FAITH AND COURAGE OF / THEIR FOREFATHERS WHO MADE / POSSIBLE THE FREEDOM OF THESE / UNITED STATES / THE BOY SCOUTS OF AMERICA / DEDICATE THIS REPLICA OF THE / STATUE OF LIBERTY AS A PLEDGE / OF EVERLASTING FIDELITY / AND LOYALTY / 40TH ANNIVERSARY CRUSADE TO / STRENGTHEN THE ARM OF LIBERTY / 1950.

== See also ==
- 1950 in art
