= Glebe House of Southwark Parish =

Historic house in Virginia, United States

- U.S. National Register of Historic Places
- Virginia Landmarks Register
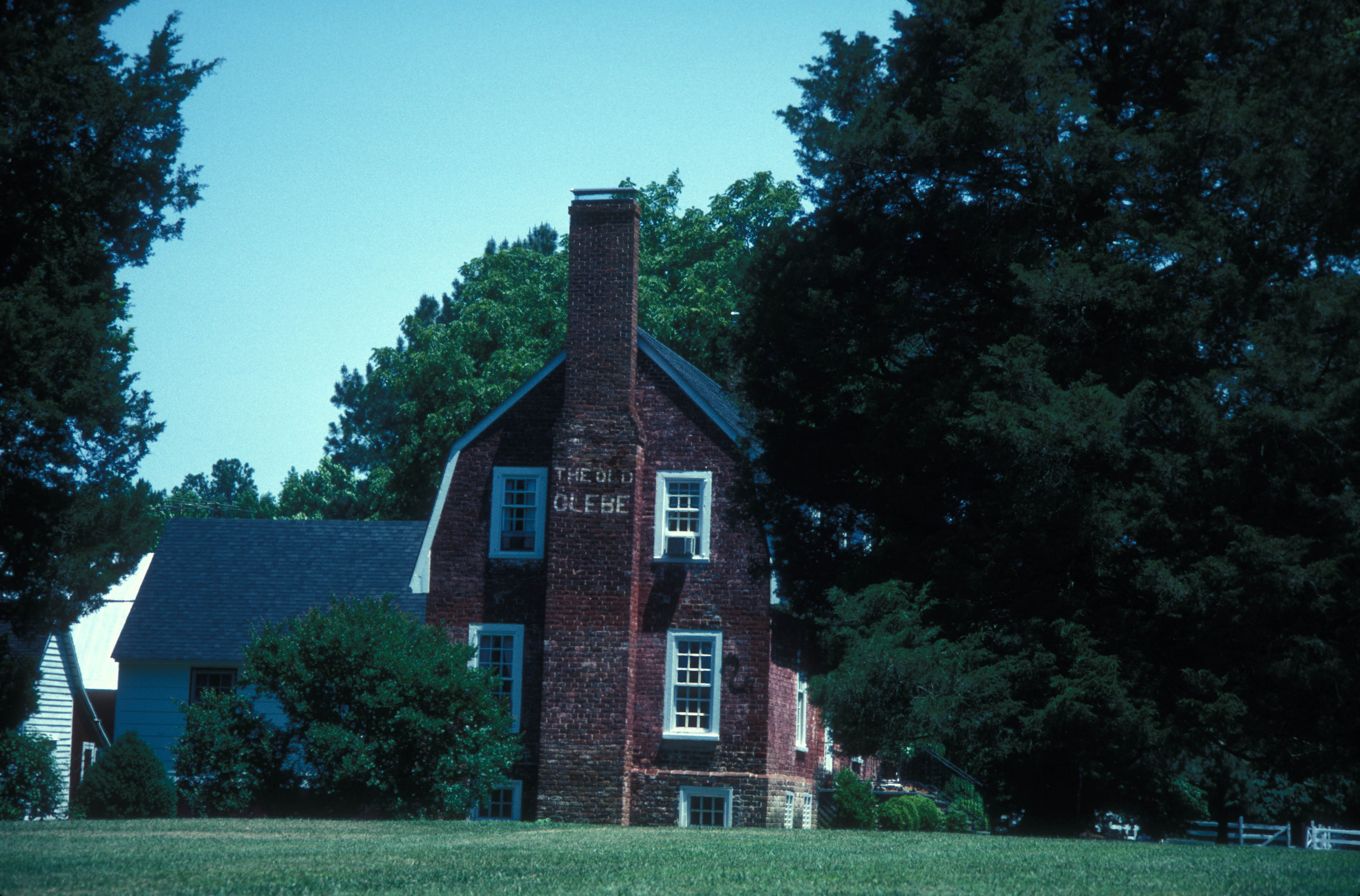
- Glebe House of Southwark Parish, April 1971

- Location within Virginia Location within the United States
- Location: E of Spring Grove on VA 10, near Spring Grove, Virginia
- Coordinates: 37°8′27″N 76°54′17″W
- Area: 22 acres (8.9 ha)
- Built: 1724
- NRHP reference No.: 76002123
- VLR No.: 090-0012

Significant dates
- Added to NRHP: May 17, 1976
- Designated VLR: October 21, 1975

Glebe House of Southwark Parish, also known as The Old Glebe, is a historic glebe house located near Spring Grove, Surry County, Virginia. It was built about 1724, and is a 1 1/2-story, three-bay, single pile, central-hall plan brick dwelling. It has a gambrel roof with dormers, added in the 19th century, has exterior end chimneys, and sits on a brick basement. Also on the property is a contributing frame smokehouse. The glebe house was sold, as required by the legislature during the Disestablishment of 1802. It was subsequently remodeled and used as a private dwelling.It sits on the site of Indian Spring Plantation patented by Nicholas Merriweather in 1666. The property is currently owned by the Perkins family.

It was listed on the National Register of Historic Places in 1976.
