= Strengthen the Arm of Liberty Monument (Austin, Texas) =

Replica of the Statue of Liberty in Austin, Texas, U.S.

Statue of Liberty Replica Monument
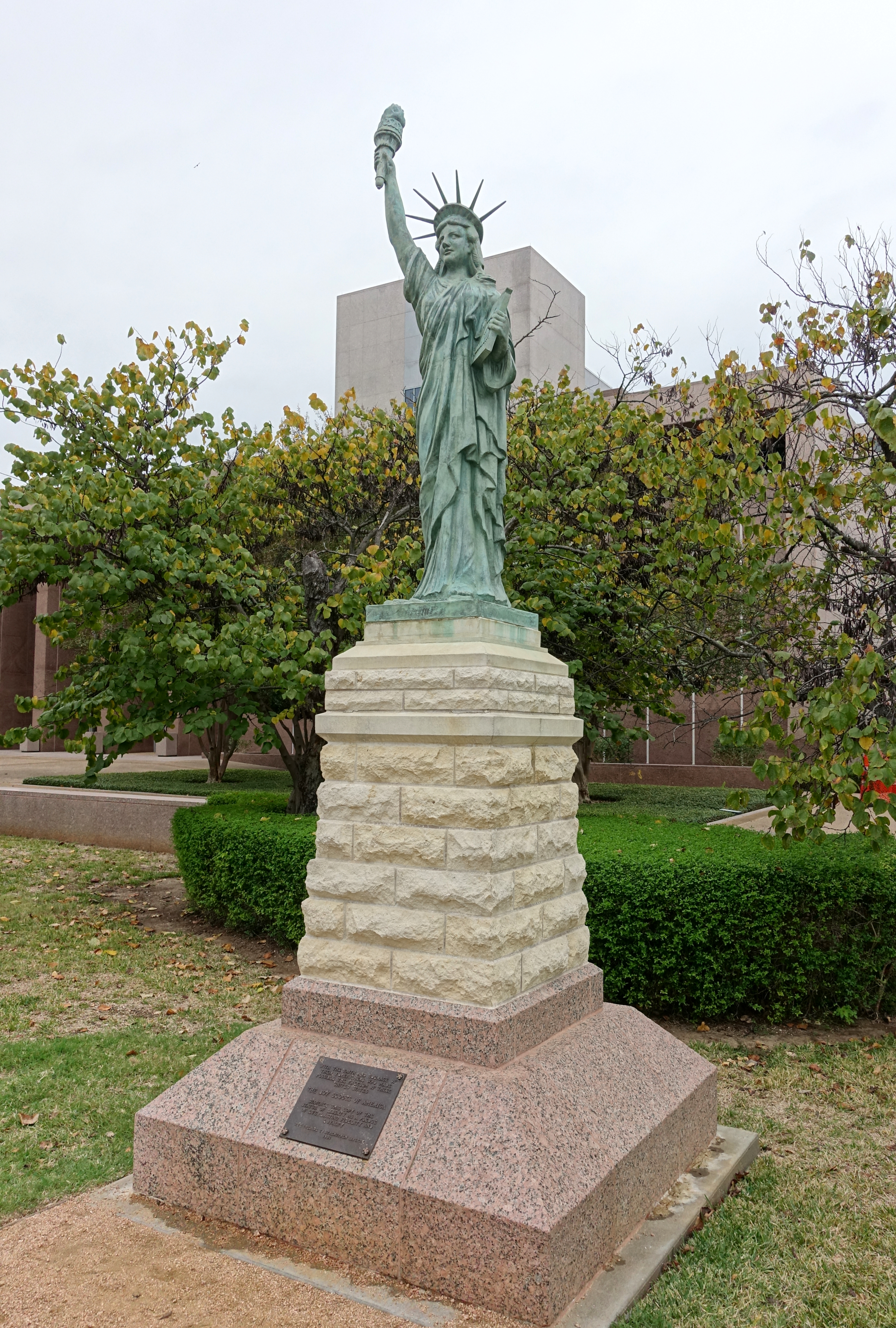
- The monument in 2015
- Year: 1951
- Medium: Bronze sculpture
- Location: Austin, Texas, United States; 30.276023°N 97.740646°W

The Statue of Liberty Replica Monument is an outdoor replica of the Statue of Liberty (Liberty Enlightening the World), installed on the Texas State Capitol grounds in Austin, Texas, United States. The bronze replica was cast by the Friedley-Voshardt Company and erected by the Boy Scouts of America in 1951.

== Background ==
Strengthen the Arm of Liberty was the theme of the Boy Scouts of America's fortieth anniversary celebration in 1950. Approximately 200 BSA Statue of Liberty replicas were installed across the United States.

The replica stands on a Texas limestone base and was originally installed southwest of the Capitol, along with a time capsule. The capsule was buried at the scout camp near Bastrop in 2008, and is scheduled to be re-opened in 2076.

== See also ==
- 1951 in art
- Strengthen the Arm of Liberty
