= Spring Grove, Virginia =

- Unincorporated community
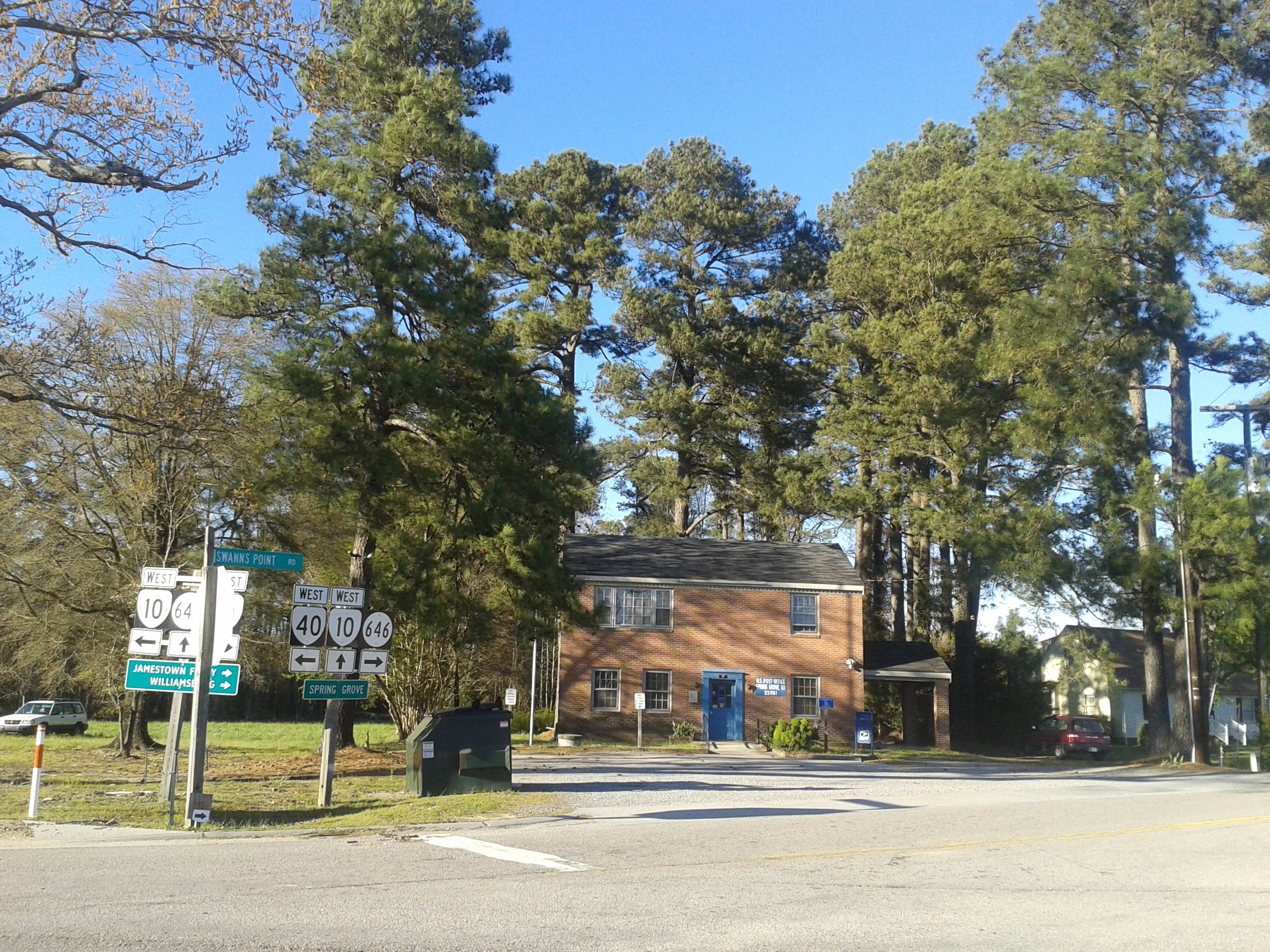
- Spring Grove post office

- Location within Virginia Location within the United States
- Coordinates: 37°09′57″N 76°58′24″W
- Country: United States
- State: Virginia
- County: Surry
- Elevation: 108 ft (33 m)
- Time zone: UTC−5 (Eastern (EST))
  - Summer (DST): UTC−4 (EDT)
- ZIP code: 23881
- Area codes: 757, 948
- GNIS feature ID: 1477778

Spring Grove is an unincorporated community primarily in Surry County, Virginia, United States. However, mailing addresses with a Spring Grove place name also exist in Prince George County. Spring Grove is located at the junction of Virginia State Route 10 and Virginia State Route 40, 7.9 miles (12.7 km) west-northwest of Surry. Spring Grove has a post office with ZIP code 23881.

The Glebe House of Southwark Parish was listed on the National Register of Historic Places in 1976.
