= Strengthen the Arm of Liberty Monument (Fayetteville, Arkansas) =

- Strengthen the Arm of Liberty Monument - Fayetteville
- U.S. National Register of Historic Places
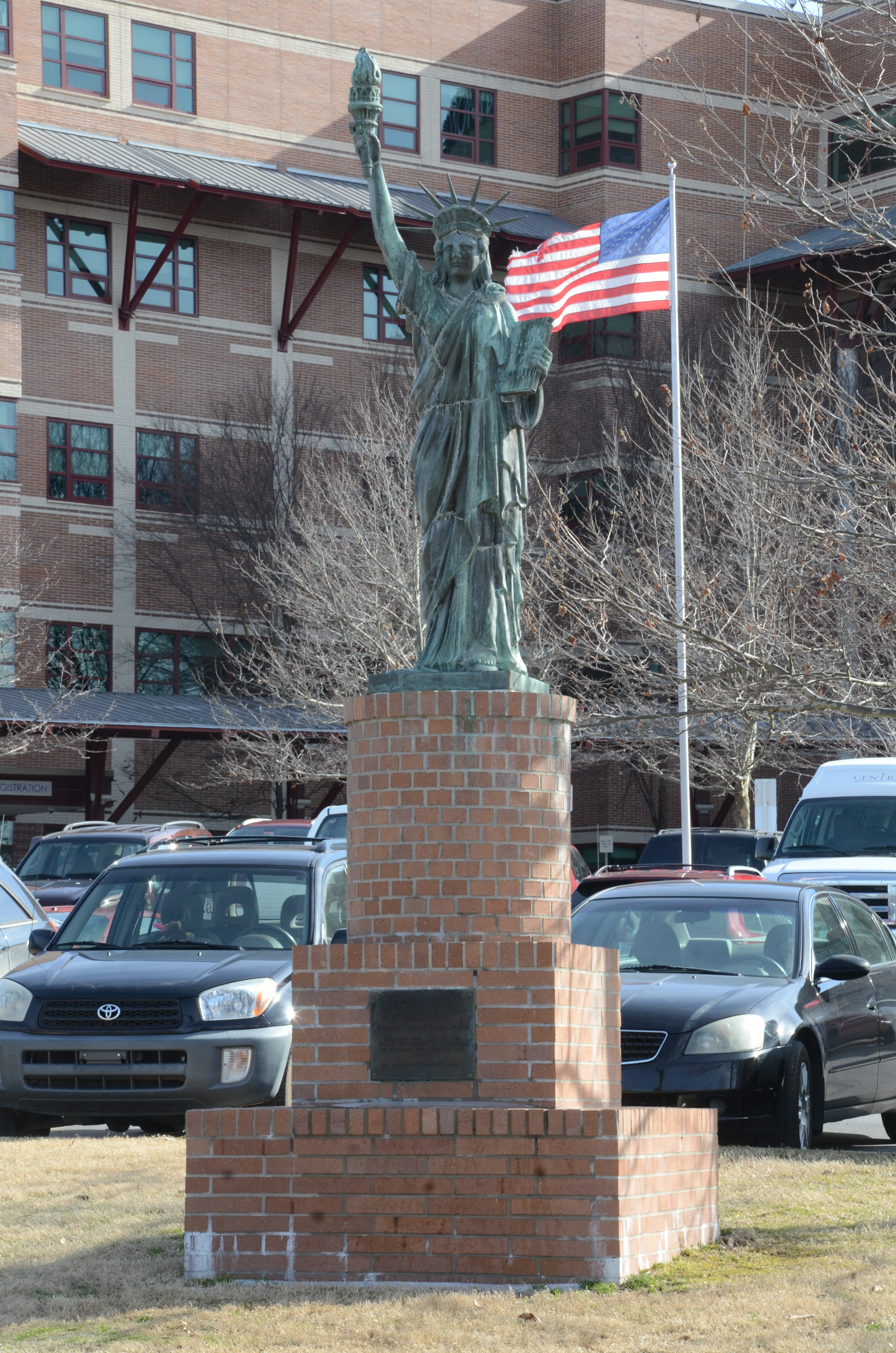

- Location within Arkansas Location within the United States
- Location: North Hills Blvd, In front of Washington Regional Medical Center, Fayetteville, Arkansas, U.S.
- Coordinates: 36°6′37.17″N 94°9′35.13″W
- Built: c. 1950
- NRHP reference No.: 00001264 (original listing); 12000279 (second listing)
- Added to NRHP: November 1, 2000; delisted January 27, 2012; relisted July 31, 2012

The Strengthen the Arm of Liberty Monument in Fayetteville, Arkansas, is a replica of the Statue of Liberty (Liberty Enlightening the World). It was placed by the Boy Scouts of America as part of its 1950s-era campaign, "Strengthen the Arm of Liberty".

It is located in front of Washington Regional Medical Center on North Hills Blvd.

The statue was removed from the National Register of Historic Places in 2012 when it was improperly moved to its new location, but was later relisted.

== See also ==
- Scouting museums
- Scouting memorials
- National Register of Historic Places listings in Washington County, Arkansas
