= Scouting museums =

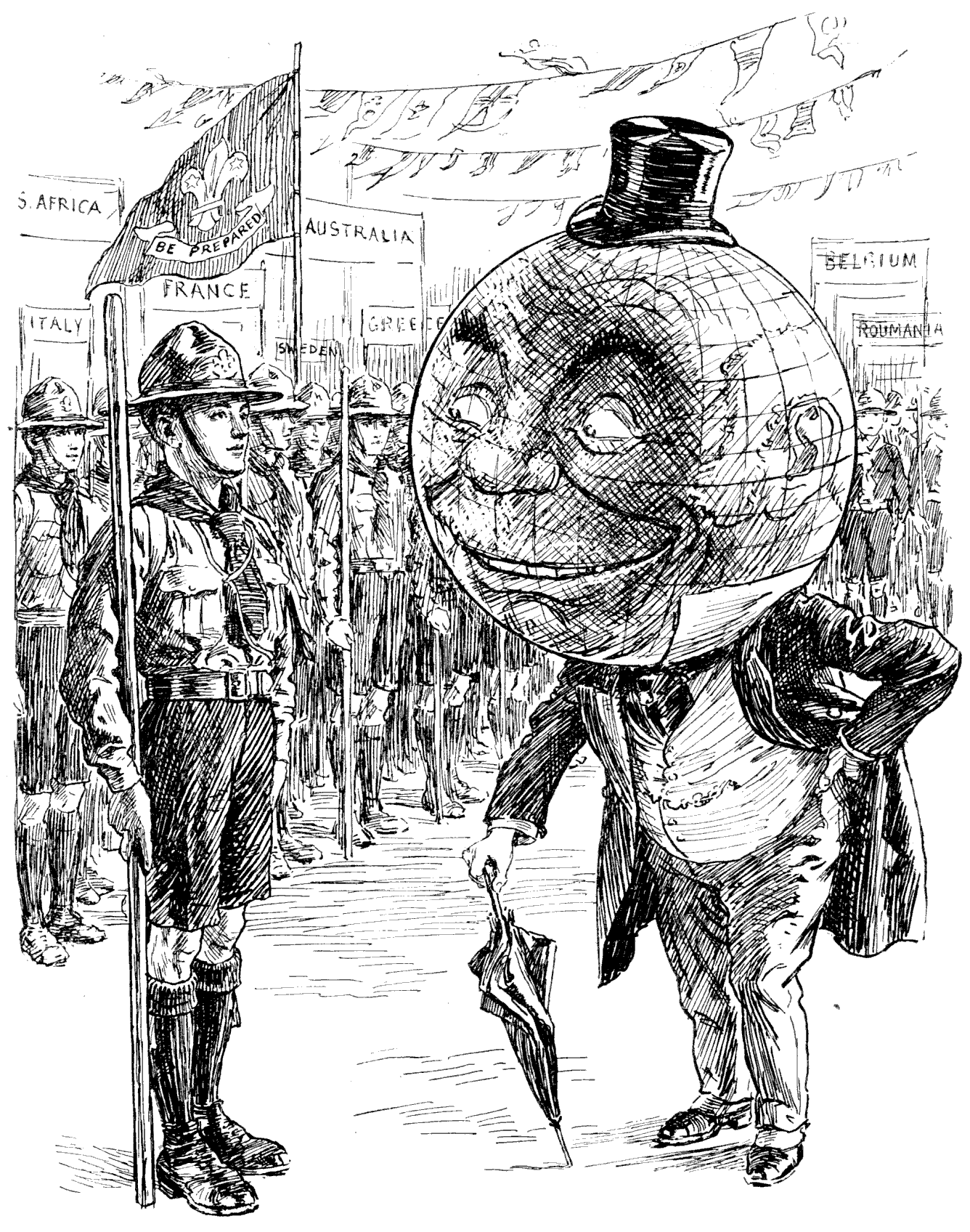
- Punch cartoon

Throughout the world there are many museums related to Scouting dedicated to preserving, communicating, and exhibiting the heritage of the Scouting movement for purposes of study, education, and enjoyment of society. A downloadable world directory of Scouting museums is available from the US Scouting Service Project.

== Africa Scout Region ==
Africa Scout Region

- Baden-Powell museum – Nyeri, Kenya, near Mount Kenya. Baden-Powell's Paxtu cottage, now a small museum, stands on the grounds of the Outspan Hotel. For years it served as a WAGGGS World Center.
- Scout Information Centre – Baden Powell's Gravesite, Nyeri, Kenya, near Mount Kenya. This is a fairly modern build which contains a small shop, a board showing badges (many collected during the 2010 World Scout Moot in Kenya) and various neckers (scarfs) from around the World. There are plans to develop it in to a fully fledged museum outlining the history of the association. Talks were under way with National Museums of Kenya to obtain suitable display cases, etc... during 2013. A number of historical items currently held at the Kenya Scout HQs in Rowallan Campsite, Nairobi are likely to be moved into the new museum once it has been completed. This includes a 1st Edition copy of Scouting for Boys.

== Asia-Pacific Region ==
Asia-Pacific Region

- Scout Museum at the National Training Centre, Mouchak, Gazipur, Bangladesh
- Hong Kong Scout Centre, Austin Road, Kowloon, Hong Kong
- Scout Association of Japan headquarters, Bunkyō, Tokyo, Japan. Museum occupies one floor of the headquarters.
- Philippine Scout Center (at the back of Manila City Hall), the Philippines
- Manila International Scout Museum (MISM) (Tondo, Manila), the Philippines
- Discovery Scout Centre, Singapore

=== Australia ===
- Tasmanian Scout Heritage Centre, Kingston, Tasmania
- South Australian Scout Archives, Henley Beach, South Australia
- Victorian Scout Heritage Centre, South Yarra, Victoria
- Scouts Queensland Heritage Centre, 'The Wheel House', Baden-Powell Park, Samford, Queensland.
- Baden-Powell House, Perth, Western Australia.
- Queensland Guide Museum, Brisbane, Queensland

=== New Zealand ===
- National Scout Museum, Blue Skies Conference and Training Centre, Kaiapoi, South Island, New Zealand

== European Scout Region ==
European Scout Region

=== Austria ===
- Pfadfindermuseum und Institut für Pfadfindergeschichte, Vienna
- Pfadfindermuseum der Gilde Bruck an der Leitha

=== Belgium ===
- Scouts en Gidsen Museum / Musée du Scoutisme et Guidisme, Louvain
- Centre Historique Belge du Scoutisme / Belgische Historische Centrum voor Scoutisme, Brussels
- International Scouting Museum, Arlon

=== Denmark ===
- Spejdermuseet Holmen
- Esbjerg Spejdermuseum
- Spejdermuseet Århus
- Stenlændernes Spejdermuseum
- KFUM-spejdernes korpshistoriske udvalg
- Sønderjysk Spejdermuseum
- Tydal Spejdermuseum
- Silkeborg Spejdermuseum
- Nordjysk Spejdermuseum
- De historiske Samlinger, Aalborg
- KFUK-Spejdermuseum (Randers)
- Randers Spejdermuseum DDS
- De Gule Spejderes museum
- Fyns Spejder- og FDF museum

=== Finland ===
- Suomen Partiomuseo – Finlands Scoutmuseum, Turku

=== France ===
- Musée Scout Réseau Baden-Powell, Thorey-Lyautey

=== Iceland ===
- Scouting Museum Iceland

=== Ireland ===
- Larch Hill Scout Museum
- Mount Melleray National Scout Museum, County Waterford
- Togher Scout Museum, Cork City

=== Italy ===
- Scout Museum, Palermo

=== The Netherlands ===
- Scouting Nederland Museum, Baarn
- Scoutingmuseum Haagse Randstad, The Hague. Traveling museum without a permanent exhibition space.
- Scouting Museum "De Ducdalf", Rotterdam

=== Norway ===
- Norwegian Guide and Scout museum, Oslo

=== Poland ===
- Museum of Scouting, Warsaw
- Olga & Andrzej Małkowski Scouting Museum Polish: Muzeum Harcerskie im. Olgi i Andrzeja Małkowskich, Zakopane
- Scouting Museum, Radom

=== Portugal ===
- Museu do Corpo Nacional de Escutas (Museu do CNE), Lisboa
- Museu do Escutismo, Dume - Braga
- Centro de Interpretação e Documentação do Escotismo - Museu dos Escoteiros de Portugal, Cova da Piedade - Almada

=== Slovakia ===
- Slovakia National Scouting Museum - Skautské múzeum Václava Rubeša v Ružomberku (Václav Rubeš Scouting Museum in Ružomberok),

=== Sweden ===
- Kjesäters Scoutmuseum & Archive, Vingåker
- Scoutmuseet, Göteborg
- Scoutmuseet i Malmö
- Nordvästra Skånes Scoutmuseum, Helsingborg

=== United Kingdom ===
- Baden-Powell House, London. A basic display and some artefacts.
- Gilwell Park, Chingford, north London. Closed in the Spring of 2016 as heritage preservation was affected by building lighting and humidity, but reopened before October 2017.
- Guide Heritage Centre, London
- Be Prepared - Scouting Museum Trust at Waddecar Scout Camp, West Lancashire.
- Youlbury Scout Activity Centre Oxfordshire
- Brownsea Island Scout camp, Poole Harbour, Dorset.
- Hertfordshire Scout Museum, Well End.

== Interamerican Scout Region ==
Interamerican Scout Region

=== Argentina ===
- Scout Museum "Baden Powell" - San Francisco, Córdoba
- Scout Museum - Guaymallén, Mendoza

=== Brazil ===
- Museu Escoteiro de Brasília.
- Cultural Centre of Scout Movement (CCME), Rio de Janeiro
- Carajás Scout Museum São Paulo

=== Canada ===
- Scouts Canada National Museum - Ottawa, Ontario
- Victoria Scout and Guide Museum - Victoria, British Columbia

=== Mexico ===
- Museo de Historia Scout - Puebla

=== United States ===
- Avondale Scout Museum, Clinton, La
- Arizona Scouting Museum
- Barbara Anderson Girl Scout Museum, Phoenix, Arizona
- Boyhaven Scouting Museum, Middle Grove, New York
- Central States Scout Museum, Larned, Kansas
- Central States Scout Museum
- E. Urner Goodman Scout Museum, Owasippe Scout Reservation, Blue Lake Township, Michigan
- Fred H. Poppe Museum, Amarillo, Texas
- George E. Freestone Boy Scout Museum, Provo, Utah
- Girl Scout First Headquarters, Savannah, Georgia
- Girl Scout Museum and Archives, Girl Scout Headquarters, New York City, New York
- Girl Scouts Heart of the Hudson Archive Museum, Camp Wendy, Wallkill, New York
- Girl Scout Museum at Cedar Hill, Camp Cedar Hill, Waltham, Massachusetts
- Girl Scout Museum at Daisy's Place, Girl Scouts of Tanasi Council Office, Knoxville, Tennessee
- Girl Scout Museum, Girl Scouts of Northern California, Oakland, California and at Camp Bothin in Fairfax, California
- Girl Scouts of Utah Heritage Museum, Salt Lake City, Utah
- Goodykoontz Museum of Girl Scout History, Houston, Texas
- Gregson Center and Museum, Pipsico Scout Reservation, Spring Grove, Virginia
- John Dyer-Hurdon Scout Collection at the Washington Historical Museum, Washington, Michigan
- Lawrence L. Lee Scouting Museum & Max I. Silber Scouting Library, Manchester, New Hampshire
- Many Point Scout Camp History Center, Ponsford, Minnesota
- Miakonda Scouting Museum, Toledo, Ohio
- National Scouting Museum, Philmont Scout Ranch, Cimarron, New Mexico
- Nathan Dauby Scouting Museum, Lake Erie Council, Cleveland, Ohio
- Nathan Hale Heritage Center, June Norcross Webster Scout Reservation, Ashford, Connecticut
- Nawakwa Lodge #3 Museum, Camp T. Brady Saunders, Maidens, Virginia
- New Jersey Scout Museum, Morganville, New Jersey
- Nobby Schnabel Museum and Nature Center, Camp Pollock, Cedar Glen, California
- Norman Rockwell Museum at Stockbridge, Massachusetts
- Norman Rockwell Museum of Vermont, Rutland, Vermont
- North East Regional Scout Museum, Rochelle Park, New Jersey
- North Star Museum of Boy Scouting and Girl Scouting, North St. Paul, Minnesota
- Osage County Historical Museum, Pawhuska, Oklahoma
- Otis H. Chidester Museum, Tucson, Arizona
- Ottawa Scouting Museum, Ottawa, Illinois
- Pioneers' Park Museum, Imperial, California
- Samoset Council Archives Room, Crystal Lake Scout Reservation, Rhinelander, Wisconsin
- Scout Heritage Museum, Three Harbors Council, Milwaukee, Wisconsin
- Ten Mile River Scout Museum, Narrowsburg, New York
- Thomas D. Trainor Boy Scout Museum, Metamora, Michigan
- Western Washington Traveling Scout Museum, Federal Way Washington
- W.C. Moorehead Museum, Camp Tuscazoar, Zoarville, Ohio
- William Hillcourt Scout Museum, Constantia, New York
- World Scouting Museum, Charleston, West Virginia
- World of Scouting Museum, Valley Forge, Pennsylvania
- Worth Ranch Museum, Palo Pinto, Texas

Virtual Museums

- Lawrence L. Lee Scouting Museum and Library, Manchester, New Hampshire
- Scout & Guide Museum page
- Scouting Milestones Scout History Website

== See also ==
- Scouting memorials
- Scouting memorabilia collecting
