= Johnette Gordon-Weaver =

American historian

Johnette Gordon-Weaver is an American historian, genealogist, and activist. She is active in the restoration and historical preservation of black history in Williamsburg, Virginia. In October 2023, she became the first African American woman to join the Williamsburg Chapter of the Daughters of the American Revolution, one of the society's oldest and largest chapters. She is also the co-founder of Williamsburg History.

== Career ==
Gordon-Weaver is a media consultant for Williamsburg Action, an organization formed after the Murder of George Floyd that is focused on racial justice and equality in Williamsburg. She participated in the city's George Floyd protest.

She is active in Reservation, the Village Initiative, and other organizations and projects that restore and preserve African-American history in Williamsburg. She serves on some of the organization's advisory boards. Gordon-Weaver wrote an essay that was included in a history book published by College of William & Mary's Bray School Lab. She is also an oral historian.

In 2021, she served as a narrator at a Black History Month service at Triangle Block, a historically black business area in Williamsburg.

She spoke at Williambsurg's fourth annual National Day of Racial Healing.

== Personal life ==
Gordon-Weaver is the daughter of Myrtle Gordon. She is the sixth-great-granddaughter of Anthony Roberts, a freedman who served as a waggoner in the 1st Virginia Regiment during the American Revolutionary War. She is a descendent of students at the Williamsburg Bray School, a school for free and enslaved black children in Williamsburg, Virginia.

In October 2023, she became the first woman of color to join the Williamsburg Chapter of the Daughters of the American Revolution, one of the society's oldest and largest chapters. Her patriot ancestor, Roberts, is the first free African-American patriot recognized by the organization at the national level.

She is Baptist and is a member of First Baptist Church.
