= Siege Museum =

Siege Museum may refer to several places:

- Siege Museum in Apprentice Boys Memorial Hall
- Siege Museum in Exchange Building (Petersburg, Virginia)
