= Chamberlayne Gardens =

Historic apartments in Virginia, US

- U.S. National Register of Historic Places
- Virginia Landmarks Register
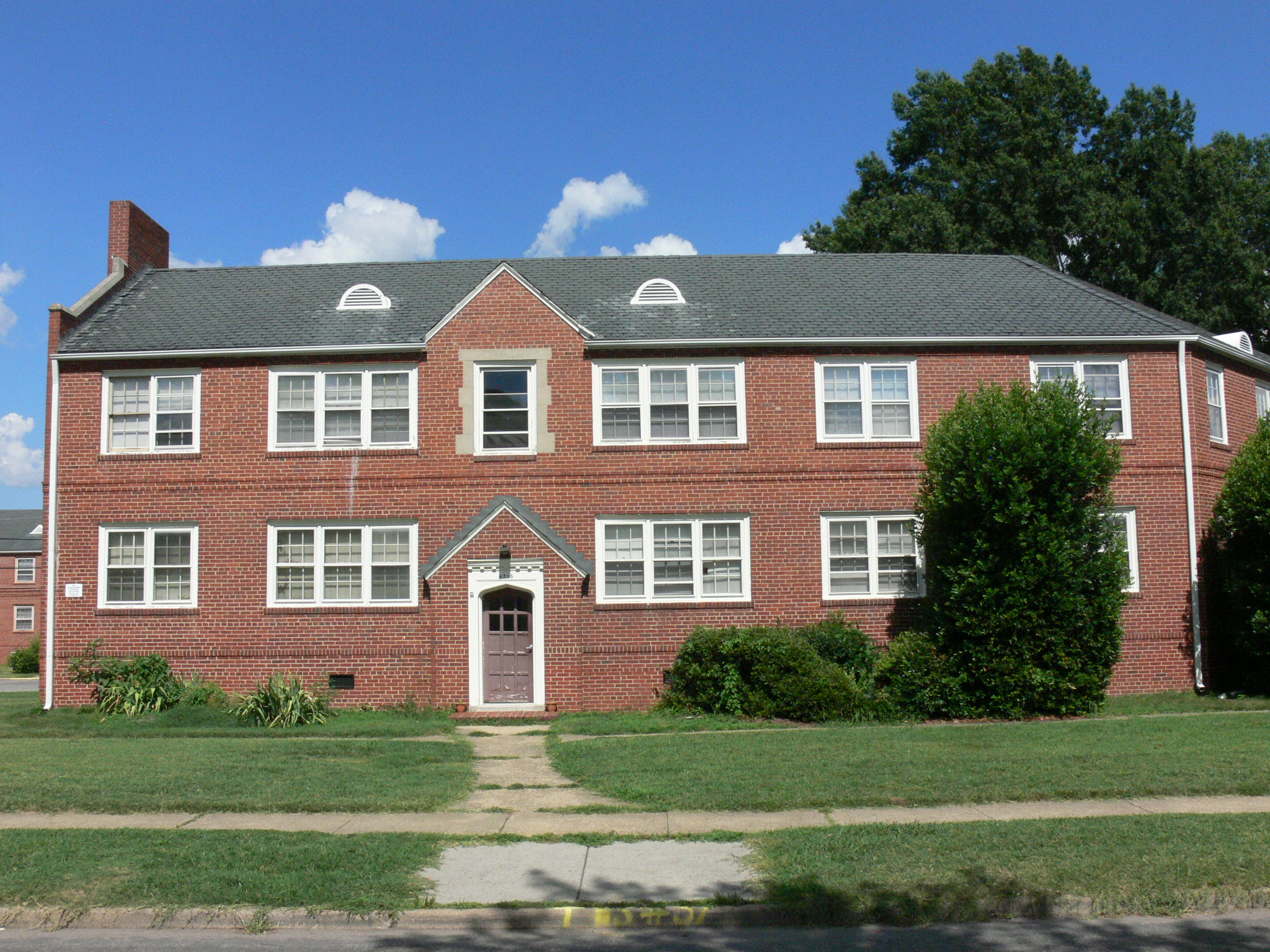
- Chamberlayne Gardens, July 2011

- Location within Virginia Location within the United States
- Location: 4301–4313 and 4315–4327 Chamberlayne Ave. and 4800–4818 Old Brook Rd., Richmond, Virginia
- Coordinates: 37°35′44″N 77°26′57″W
- Area: 11.7 acres (4.7 ha)
- Built: 1945–1946
- Architect: Bernard Betzig Spigel
- Architectural style: Colonial Revival
- MPS: Federal Housing Administration-Insured Garden Apartments in Richmond, Virginia MPS
- NRHP reference No.: 07000390
- VLR No.: 127-6182

Significant dates
- Added to NRHP: May 2, 2007
- Designated VLR: March 7, 2007

Chamberlayne Gardens is a historic garden apartment complex located on Richmond's North Side in Richmond, Virginia. Built in 1945–1946, it is the oldest surviving Federal Housing Administration (FHA)-insured apartment complex in Richmond and the largest of the FHA-funded apartments built in the city during the 1940s. The complex was listed on the National Register of Historic Places in 2007 as part of the Federal Housing Administration-Insured Garden Apartments in Richmond, Virginia Multiple Property Submission.

== History ==
=== Post-war housing context ===
Following World War II, the United States faced a severe housing shortage as millions of veterans returned home seeking independent housing. The Federal Housing Administration, established by the National Housing Act of 1934, had developed guidelines and standards for multi-family housing construction to address this crisis. The FHA promoted garden apartments—low-rise residential complexes set within landscaped grounds—as an efficient and affordable housing solution for the expanding urban middle class.

Between 1942 and 1950, the FHA insured 43 mortgages for multi-family apartments in Richmond, with a total value of $31,365,200. Only six apartment buildings or complexes were built in Richmond during the 1940s with FHA funding; of these, only five survive. Brookfield Gardens, which was the oldest, was demolished in the 1970s, making Chamberlayne Gardens the oldest surviving FHA-funded apartment complex in the city.

=== Construction ===
Construction of Chamberlayne Gardens began in the first half of 1945, before the end of World War II, and was completed by 1946. The complex was developed by the Old Brook Corporation and Watkins Corporation, which received city permits in 1945. Despite material and labor shortages caused by the war, the project was completed by December 1946.

The complex was designed by Bernard Betzig Spigel (1895–1968), a Norfolk architect. Spigel was a Richmond native who moved to Norfolk as a boy, graduated from Carnegie Institute of Technology, and served in the Army Corps of Engineers during World War I. He practiced architecture in Norfolk from 1920 until his death, specializing in commercial buildings. Spigel's other notable works include the First Baptist Church in Williamsburg, Virginia (1956), one of only two known church designs by the architect.

== Architecture ==
Chamberlayne Gardens consists of 52 Colonial Revival style brick buildings arranged in 16 attached groups across 11.7 acres (4.7 ha) spanning two full city blocks. The buildings follow four distinct plans and range from two to three stories in height, containing a total of 216 one- and two-bedroom apartments.

The buildings alternate between red and buff-colored brick exteriors. Most feature gabled slate roofs, while some have flat roofs with parapet ends capped with the original tile. The complex showcases many distinctive characteristics of garden apartment design, including central courtyards, generous landscaping, and the use of abundant natural lighting indoors.

The Colonial Revival style was the predominant architectural style for FHA-insured garden apartments in Richmond during this period, reflecting the influence of the restoration of Colonial Williamsburg and contemporary preferences for traditional American architectural forms.

== Significance ==
Chamberlayne Gardens is significant as a particularly well-preserved example of garden apartment design from the immediate post-World War II era. Of the FHA-funded apartment complexes constructed in Richmond, it was the largest and is the only one to occupy two complete city blocks; all other FHA apartments in the city shared their sites with other houses and apartments.

The complex retains much of its late 1940s fixtures and character and represents one of Richmond's few remaining testaments to the important demographic changes that occurred following World War II, when returning veterans and their families sought affordable housing in urban areas.

== See also ==
- National Register of Historic Places listings in Richmond, Virginia
- Garden apartment
