= National Register of Historic Places listings in Williamsburg, Virginia =

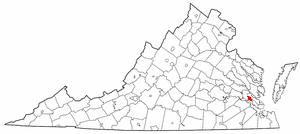
Location of Williamsburg in Virginia

This is a list of the National Register of Historic Places listings in Williamsburg, Virginia.

This is intended to be a complete list of the properties and districts on the National Register of Historic Places in the independent city of Williamsburg, Virginia, United States. The locations of National Register properties and districts for which the latitude and longitude coordinates are included below, may be seen in an online map.

There are 15 properties and districts listed on the National Register in the city, including 6 National Historic Landmarks.

This National Park Service list is complete through NPS recent listings posted June 20, 2025.

== Current listings ==
	Name on the Register	Image	Date listed	Location	Description
1	Armistead House	Armistead House	August 10, 2020 (#100005437)	320 N. Henry St. 37°16′27″N 76°42′23″W	
2	Bruton Parish Church	Bruton Parish Church	May 10, 1970 (#70000861)	Duke of Gloucester St. 37°16′17″N 76°42′09″W	
3	Chandler Court and Pollard Park Historic District	Chandler Court and Pollard Park Historic District	October 3, 1996 (#96001075)	Roughly bounded by Jamestown Rd., Griffin Ave., Pollard Park, and the College of William and Mary maintenance yard 37°16′06″N 76°42′37″W	
4	College Landing	College Landing	July 12, 1978 (#78003188)	Confluence of College and Paper Mill Creeks; 37°15′09″N 76°42′36″W	Site of Williamsburg's main port in the 18th century
4	College Terrace Historic District	College Terrace Historic District	February 23, 2021 (#100006176)	600 and 700 blks. of College Ter. and Richmond Rd. 37°16′34″N 76°43′00″W	
5	Colonial National Historical Park	Colonial National Historical Park	October 15, 1966 (#66000839)	Colonial Parkway; 37°16′05″N 76°42′07″W	
6	First Baptist Church	First Baptist Church	June 5, 2017 (#100001050)	727 Scotland St. 37°16′27″N 76°42′40″W	
7	Merchants Square and Resort Historic District	Merchants Square and Resort Historic District	May 3, 2006 (#06000365)	Boundary St., Duke of Gloucester St., S. England St., Francis St., Henry St., and Prince George St. 37°16′15″N 76°42′24″W	
8	Peyton Randolph House	Peyton Randolph House	April 15, 1970 (#70000863)	Corner of Nicholson and N. England Sts. 37°16′21″N 76°42′00″W	
9	James Semple House	James Semple House	April 15, 1970 (#70000864)	Southern side of Frances St. between Blair and Walker Sts. 37°16′13″N 76°41′34″W	
10	Matthew Whaley School	Matthew Whaley School	August 13, 2004 (#04000857)	301 Scotland St. 37°16′26″N 76°42′15″W	
11	Williamsburg Historic District	Williamsburg Historic District	October 15, 1966 (#66000925)	Bounded by Francis, Waller, Nicholson, N. England, Lafayette, and Nassau Sts. 37°16′27″N 76°43′20″W	
12	Williamsburg Inn	Williamsburg Inn	June 4, 1997 (#97000480)	136 E. Francis St. 37°16′08″N 76°41′51″W	
13	Wren Building, College of William and Mary	Wren Building, College of William and Mary	October 15, 1966 (#66000929)	College of William and Mary campus 37°16′15″N 76°42′32″W	
14	Wythe House	Wythe House	April 15, 1970 (#70000866)	Western side of the Palace Green; 37°16′20″N 76°42′09″W	

== See also ==
- List of National Historic Landmarks in Virginia
- National Register of Historic Places listings in Virginia
- National Register of Historic Places listings in James City County, Virginia
