= Williamsburg Bray School =

School for Black children in Virginia, US

Coordinates: 37°16′11.6″N 76°42′15.0″W

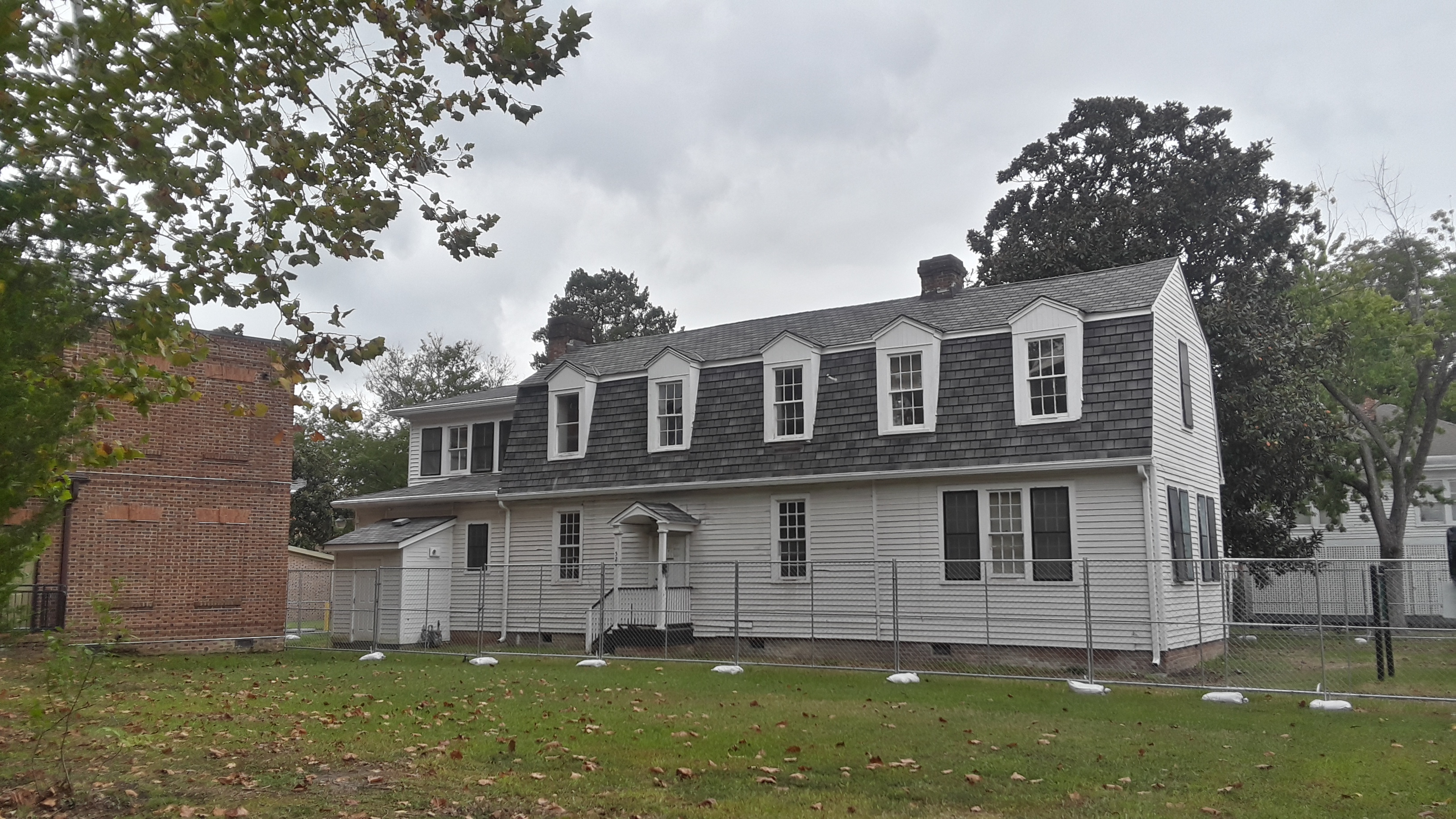
The Bray-Digges House in October 2021, prior to its move to Colonial Williamsburg and restoration

The Williamsburg Bray School was a school for free and enslaved Black children founded in 1760 in Williamsburg, Virginia. Opened at Benjamin Franklin's suggestion in 1760, the school educated potentially hundreds of students until its closure in 1774. The house it first occupied is believed to be the "oldest extant building in the United States dedicated to the education of Black children".

Constructed in 1760, the structure has also been known as the Dudley Digges House and Bray-Digges House. (Note: After the building's first move, the building was also described as the "Prince George Street House".) Bought by Methodist missionaries in the mid-1920s, the building was renovated and renamed Brown Hall. Its colonial origins not visible though known, the structure was not purchased by John D. Rockefeller Jr.'s Colonial Williamsburg project, but was instead acquired by the College of William & Mary in 1930. The building and its additions were moved to William & Mary's campus, eventually housing the college's military science and ROTC programs from 1980 until 2021.

After studies and an inventory were performed, the building was again moved in February 2023 to Colonial Williamsburg's historic area. A ribbon-cutting ceremony was held on Juneteenth, 2025, commemorating the opening of school building to public exhibition following restoration work.

== History ==
=== Construction and school ===
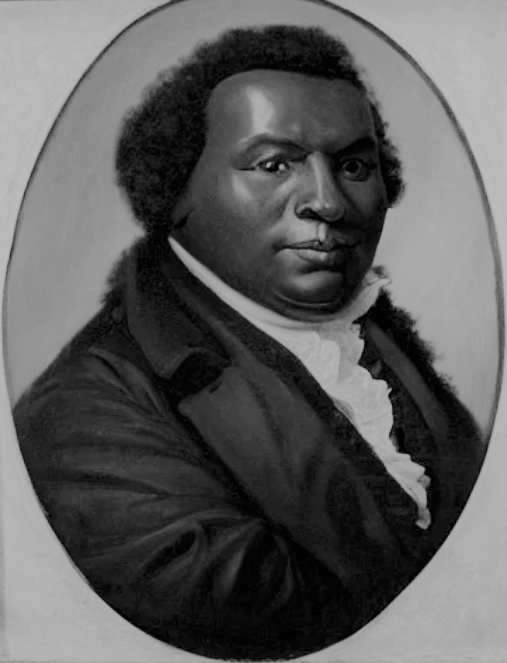
Baptist preacher Gowan Pamphlet's literacy may have resulted from the Bray School.

The building's original lot was on the southeast corner of Prince George St. and Boundary St. in Williamsburg, Virginia traces to a September 6, 1712 deed to William Craig, which included stipulations to build a house within 24 months. In 1719, a dwelling house is recorded in a will to Craig's daughters. On November 15, 1734, daughter Sarah Craig Henrikin sold a lot on which they had been living to Hannah Shields. Hannah's sons Matthew and James then sold it to Dudley Digges Jr. on November 14, 1763. The house was built in the Cape Cod style in 1760. In 1763-1765, the house was rented for £8 per annum by the Associates of Dr. Bray, which had been organized to educate enslaved African-Americans. The Associates of Dr. Bray was founded by Thomas Bray, a Church of England clergyman who had also founded the Society for Promoting Christian Knowledge and Society for the Propagation of the Gospel in Foreign Parts. (Note: Bray died in 1730; the organization was also known as the Associates of the Late Dr. Bray.) The organization had constructed a successful school for Philadelphia after Benjamin Franklin suggested the site in 1757. Franklin, a member of the Associates, had suggested that "New York, Williamsburgh and Newport" would be good choices.

In 1756, Franklin had been awarded an honorary degree by the College of William & Mary during a visit to Williamsburg. Franklin's suggestion might have been partly inspired by William & Mary's foundation in 1693 to educate and Christianize American Indians. During his 1756 visit and through correspondence with Williamsburg residents, Franklin became familiar with the college's ecclesiastical faculty and their religious education of Black students: Henry Compton, Bishop of London and first chancellor of the College of William & Mary, was a "powerful proponent for the salvation of black souls in America" and William Dawson, the Church of England rector of Bruton Parish Church and president of the College of William & Mary, had written to England in 1743 inquiring about school rules should a school for Black students be founded in Williamsburg. James Blair, William & Mary's founder and a Church of England missionary, had attempted to broaden the role of the college's Indian school at the Brafferton to include Black religious education through a 1699 resolution in the Virginia General Assembly. This resolution failed; some, including royal governor Francis Nicholson, considered converting Black persons brought to America as impossible and believed those born in America were "generally baptised and brought up in the Christian Religion."

The school – variously known as the Bray School, "Negroe School", or the "Charity School" – opened on Michaelmas, September 29, 1760. (Note: Reference include:) Franklin selected two men to oversee the school: Bruton Parish rector and William & Mary president Thomas Dawson – a relationship which afforded security for the school in a society largely opposed to Black education –, and The Virginia Gazette publisher William Hunter. Dawson, a longtime advocate for Black religious education, died two months after the school opened and Hunter died the following August. Further local trustees were appointed by the Associates of Dr. Bray, with Robert Carter Nicholas the longest-serving.

Ann Wager, a widow and admired teacher of white Williamsburg children, served as schoolmistress and oversaw the 25 to 30 Bray School students between 3 and 10 years old. They included both enslaved and free Black children, with those enslaved requiring permission from their masters. (Note: Free Black children appear on the 1762 roll.) Among those known to have sent enslaved children to attend the Bray School were tavern owners Christiana Campbell and Jane Vobe. Vobe sent two enslaved children to be educated by the Bray School, perhaps contributing to First Baptist Church-founder Gowan Pamphlet's literacy. William & Mary also sent two of its enslaved children, Adam and Fanny, to the Bray School in 1769.

The curriculum focused on the Bible and Anglican catechesis, with Wager escorting the students to Bruton Parish services on feast days and giving students copies of the Book of Common Prayer after completing an exam on the catechism. Wager was kind to her students, though the curriculum also enforced pro-slavery ideology. Students were also taught manners and reading. Girls were also taught to knit and sew. Although Black Virginian oral tradition referred to some Bray School students as the "first black teachers in Virginia" and says they assisted in the escape of their fellow enslaved through sharing their knowledge of writing, writing was not taught at the school. Teaching enslaved persons to read would be outlawed by Virginia in the 19th century. The Bray School moved from the original building in 1765 and closed in 1774. Over the school's 14 years of operation, Wager educated up to several hundred students.

=== Private residence and first move ===
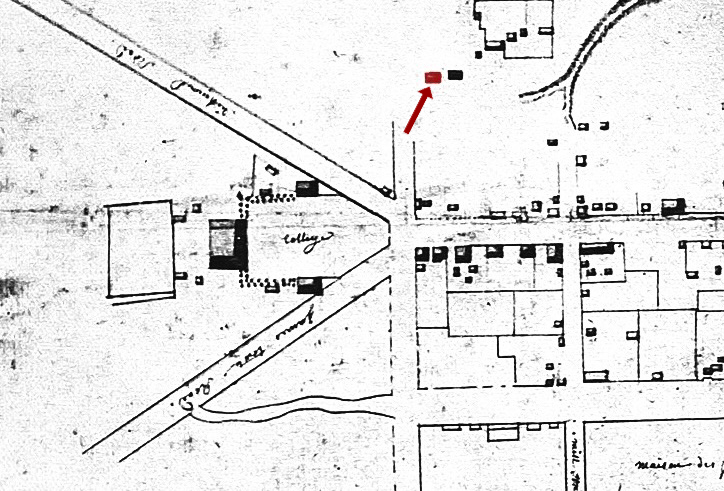
The original location of the Bray-Digges House marked in red with arrow on detail of the Frenchman's Map, c. 1782

Following its use by the Bray School, the house was occupied by the Digges family. Dudley Digges (III, b.1747) died in the house in 1768 of smallpox; his father Dudley Digges Jr. died in 1771 and passed the house to his surviving son Edward Digges. Edward sold properties including the house to his sisters Elizabeth, Maria, and Susanna in 1779 for £1,500. The Digges family remained resident there until the early 19th century.

The house's ownership during the 19th century is largely unknown, with the relevant documents lost during a 1911 fire at the Williamsburg courthouse. By 1921, but perhaps as early as the Antebellum period, a one-story heated shed-roof wing had been added to the back of the house. The house's title records resume in 1896, with its court-ordered sale from J.F. Hubbard to M.R. Harrell. Harrell bequeathed the property to Edgar, Eugene, and Thomas Potts in 1904; it was sold to Alice P. Stryker in 1923, who added a two-story rear wing and gambrel roof.

The early 20th century saw the admission of women to William & Mary and a large increase in student population, with housing largely left to be filled by private, often religious groups. Lee Britt, the "dynamic" head of the Williamsburg Methodist Church's Woman’s Missionary Society, identified the property as an ideal site for a girls' dormitory. Britt presented the idea to the society's executive committee in October 1925 and funds were raised from William & Mary alumni. Stryker sold the home to missionaries associated with the Methodist Episcopal Church, South in January 1926 for almost $12,000 (equivalent to $218,233 in 2025). With the house joining the growing Methodist community associated with the new Williamsburg Methodist Church, Britt led the further renovation and expansion of the house in 1926-1927. A two-story wing facing Boundary St. was added and the building renamed Brown Hall for a local Methodist family. In this configuration, the building was home to 14 female college students in 1927 and 12 in 1929.

While the building's character was considered evocative of the Colonial Revival and its domestic appearance praised, the house proved too small for the Methodists' aspirations. Britt, hoping to increase capacity, sought to move the old house and construct a larger brick dormitory capable of housing 75 to 85 women on the site. In March 1930, Kenneth Chorley of John D. Rockefeller Jr.'s Williamsburg Holding Corporation was approached about purchasing the building to serve as a tearoom for visitors to the Colonial Williamsburg restoration but Chorley declined the offer, perhaps because the renovations had obfuscated the structure's colonial origins. (Note: Britt wrote to Chorley in 1930 that the house was "one of the oldest houses in Williamsburg" and incorrectly presumed the Dudley Digges who had constructed the house was the colonial Dudley Digges (patriot) of nearby Yorktown.) Instead, William & Mary president J.A.C. Chandler purchased the building two months later, and, on May 8, 1930, the school building was moved to the campus at 524 Prince George St. By the start of the Fall 1930 semester, the college's first athletic director, "Pappy" Gooch, had moved into the moved house. A three-story dormitory, also named Brown Hall, was constructed on the original lot; it, too, was acquired by the college in 1939. (Note: The three-story dormitory was used by William & Mary as student housing until 2021, when it was vacated. In 2024, it was announced that it would be converted into an academic building and renamed after college chancellor and former U.S. Secretary of Defense Robert Gates.)

Under ownership by the college, the house was further expanded and porches constructed; the latter were later enclosed. In the late 1980s, the college's military science and ROTC programs moved into the building, resulting in further strengthening and fireproofing renovations. The building was used in this capacity until 2021.

=== Rediscovery, commemoration, and preservation ===
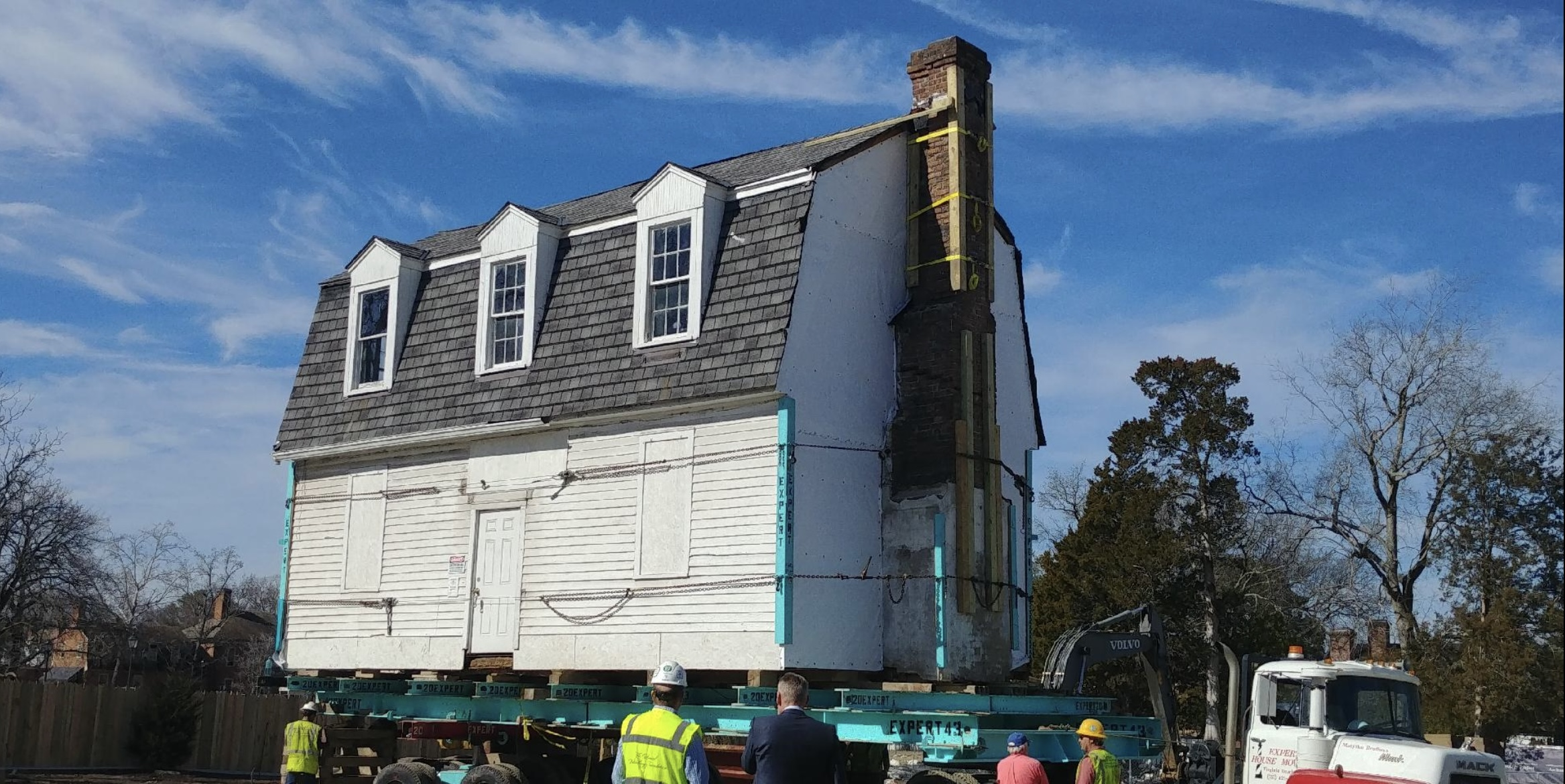
The Bray-Digges House was moved to its present location in Colonial Williamsburg on February 10, 2023. The chimney, exposed as it would have been when first constructed, had been interior following multiple renovations.

Terry L. Meyers, an English professor at William & Mary, re-identified the building as an 18th-century construction and the Bray School's probable site in 2002. Meyers had developed an interest in researching 19th-century Williamsburg, much of which was destroyed during the 1920s Colonial Williamsburg restoration efforts. He encountered a book on pre-restoration Williamsburg by Ed Belvin that made reference to a home on the corner of Prince George St. and Boundary St. named Brown Hall that had belonged to the Digges family. According to Belvin, William & Mary had bought the house and moved it across the street, where it was still in use at the time Belvin was writing. After learning that the college did not have any record of possessing such an 18th-century house, Meyers and a William & Mary Historic Campus director Louise Kale searched the campus for the building. They determined that, despite not appearing colonial, the military science building was the likely candidate.

A 2014 dig performed by a joint Colonial Williamsburg-William & Mary team was performed at the site of Brown Hall in search of evidence of the Bray School; it was the third-straight year of digs at the site. In 2019, a Virginia state historical marker commemorating the Bray School was unveiled at the school's original site during a ceremony featuring William & Mary president Katherine Rowe, Meyers, and Lemon Project director Jody L. Allen. (Note: The Lemon Project is a William & Mary research project investigating the college's involvement in slavery and continued relationship with African-Americans.) At the ceremony, Meyers said that William & Mary could "with obvious caveats and qualifications" be described as "the first institution of higher learning in what is today America to concern itself with black education" because of its association with the Bray School.

Further historic documentation, including photographs, were found within Colonial Williamsburg's library that confirmed the building's identity. Additional evidence showed that Digges had been paid to let the house as a school. In 2020, dendrochronology determined that timber in the house dated to the winter of 1759–60. The next year, the Colonial Williamsburg Foundation entered into a partnership with William & Mary to perform the relocation, restoration, and interpretation of the Bray School building. After the college's military science department left the building, an inventory was performed with the objective of preparing for the restoration. Additionally, the inventory hoped to record 20th-century history that would be lost in this restoration.

The building, described as the United States' "oldest schoolhouse for Black children", was moved a half-mile from the college campus into Colonial Williamsburg on February 10, 2023. The new site for the school building is alongside the recently discovered brick foundations that belonged to the original location of the First Baptist Church, among the first Black churches in the country. The building's survival to present has been described as "remarkable" in light of the significant number of demolitions undertaken during the 1920s restoration efforts.

== Architectural history ==
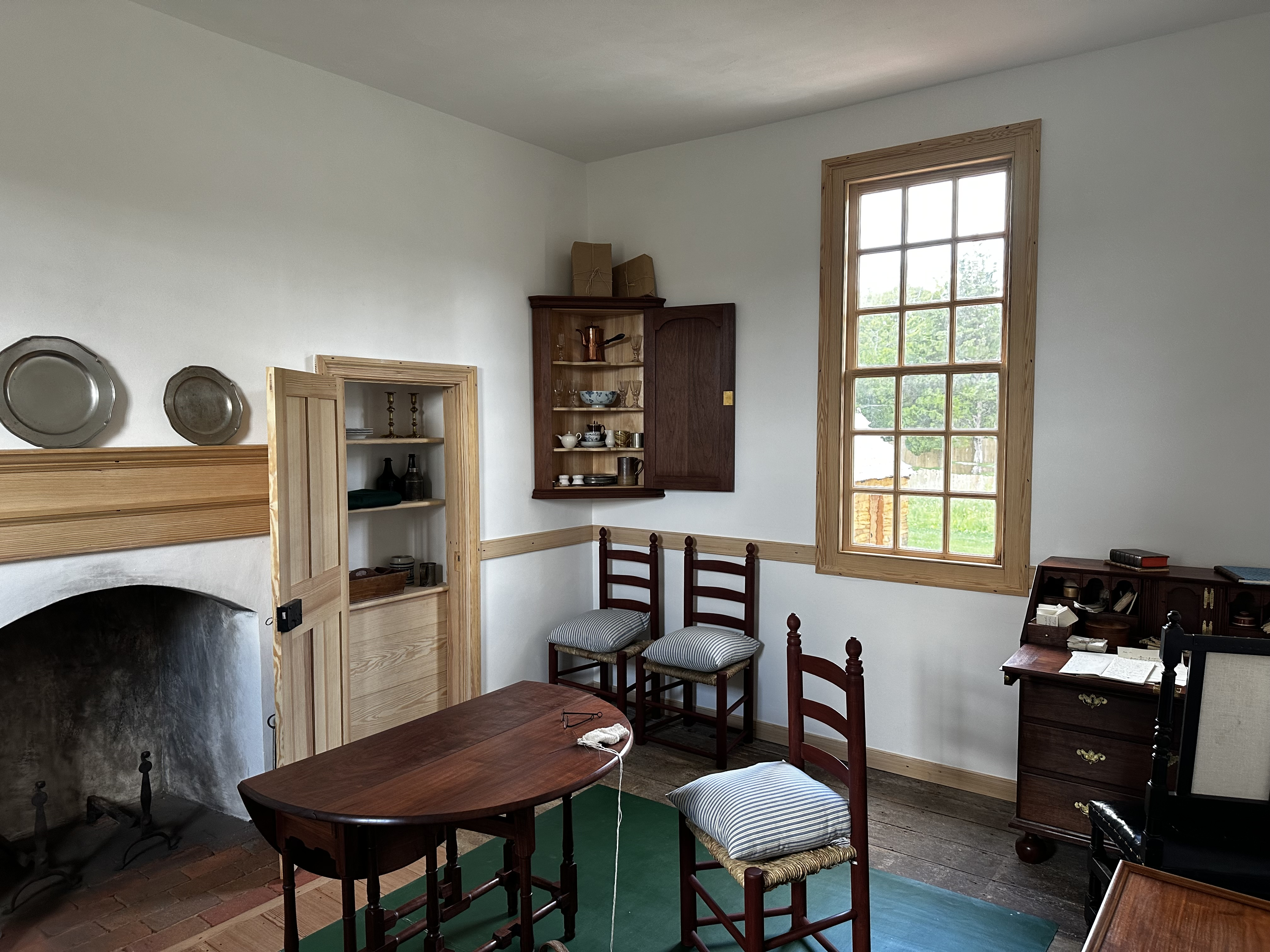
The restored interior of the Williamsburg Bray School

The building's appearance was repeatedly altered through its use by multiple owners, resulting in multiple schemes for dividing the renovations and changes into discrete architectural history periods. A 2009 study on the house divided the changes into three periods: Period I (c. 1735–c. 1765), Period II (c. 1805–c. 1815), and Period III (1923 onwards). The 2021 inventory identified an original appearance with eight periods of alterations, including three from the building's 1930 move to William & Mary until the departure of the ROTC program in 2021. Prior to the 2020 dendrochronology, the 2009 study held that the earliest date of construction was 1734 based on attestation of a residential structure at the site but that surviving design and structural elements suggested a date in the latter half of the 18th century.

The building was originally constructed in as a Cape Cod-style home. The present building, restored by Colonial Williamsburg, retains much of the original material. Among the major alterations to occur over the course of the structure's history was the addition of multiple wings, the switch from a gable roof to a gambrel design, and late introduction of modern electrical systems. All but three original windows and the early 19th-century alterations were lost sometime around 1923 in renovations that deleted the rear shed wing.

== See also ==
- Alumni House (College of William & Mary), a former private residence on the college's campus
- Hearth: Memorial to the Enslaved, the college's monument to the enslaved
- President's House (College of William & Mary), an 18th-century campus building built by enslaved persons
- Wren Building, an 18th-century campus building built by enslaved persons
