= College Landing Archeological Site =

Archaeological site in Virginia, United States

- College Landing
- U.S. National Register of Historic Places
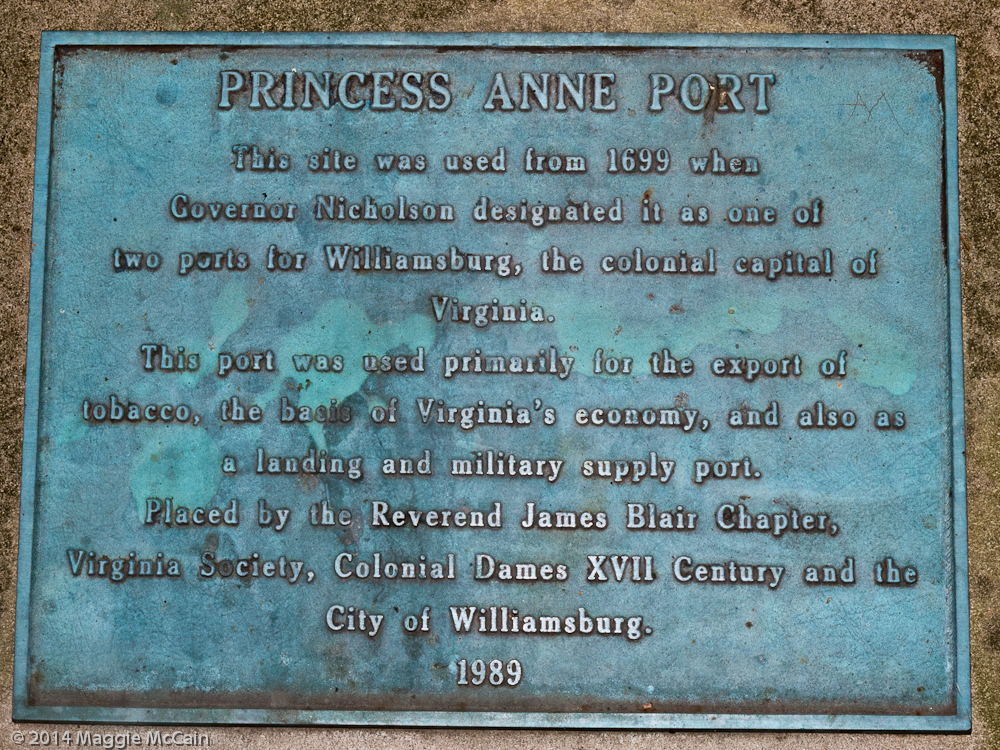
- Historical marker at the site
- Location: College Landing Park area, Williamsburg, Virginia
- Area: 22 acres (8.9 ha)
- Built: 1699
- NRHP reference No.: 78003188
- Added to NRHP: July 12, 1978

The College Landing Archeological Site is the site of a colonial-era port area in Williamsburg, Virginia. Located near the confluence of College Creek and Paper Mill Creek, the site was the main port facility for Williamsburg after it was established in 1699. The area was populated with wharves, warehouses, and industrial facilities, but fell into decline after the state capital was moved to Richmond at the time of the American Revolutionary War. The site was the subject of salvage excavation at the time of a 1976 highway project in the area.

The site was listed on the National Register of Historic Places in 1978.

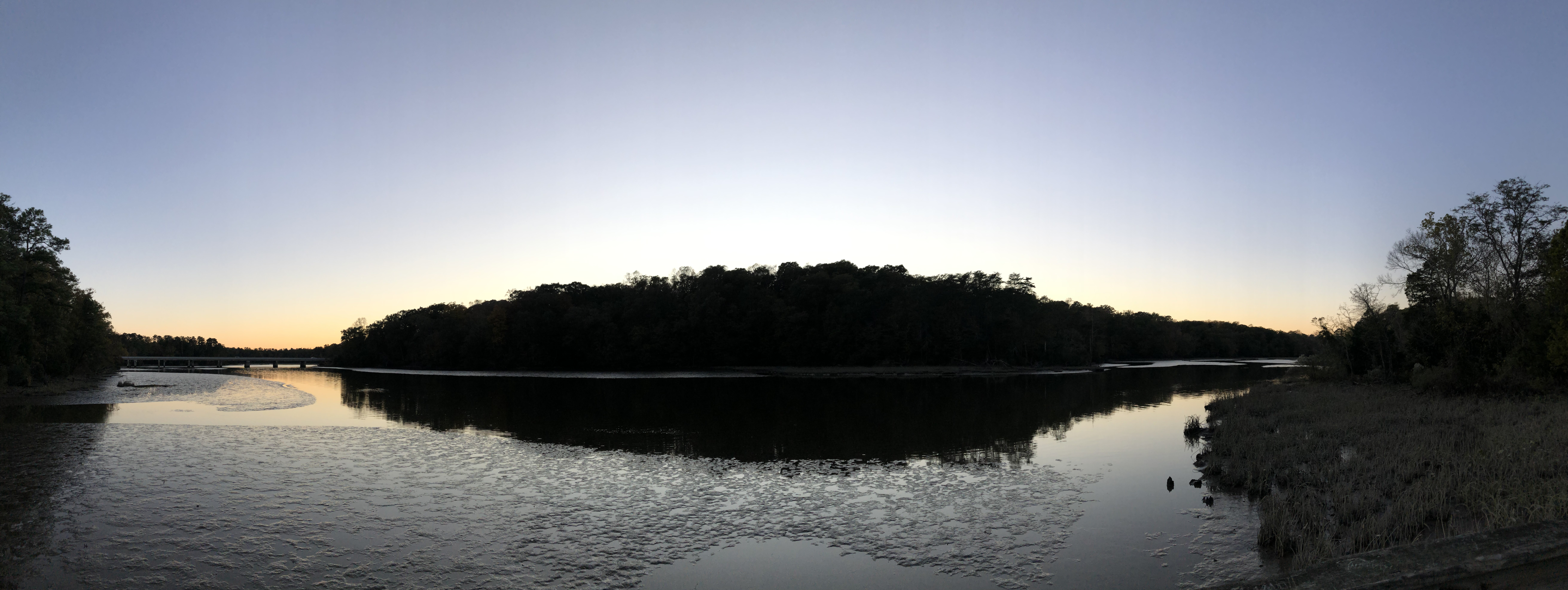
Panorama of the site, 2020

== See also ==
- National Register of Historic Places listings in Williamsburg, Virginia
