= Nathaniel Friend House =

Historic house in Virginia, United States

- U.S. National Register of Historic Places
- U.S. Historic district – Contributing property
- Virginia Landmarks Register
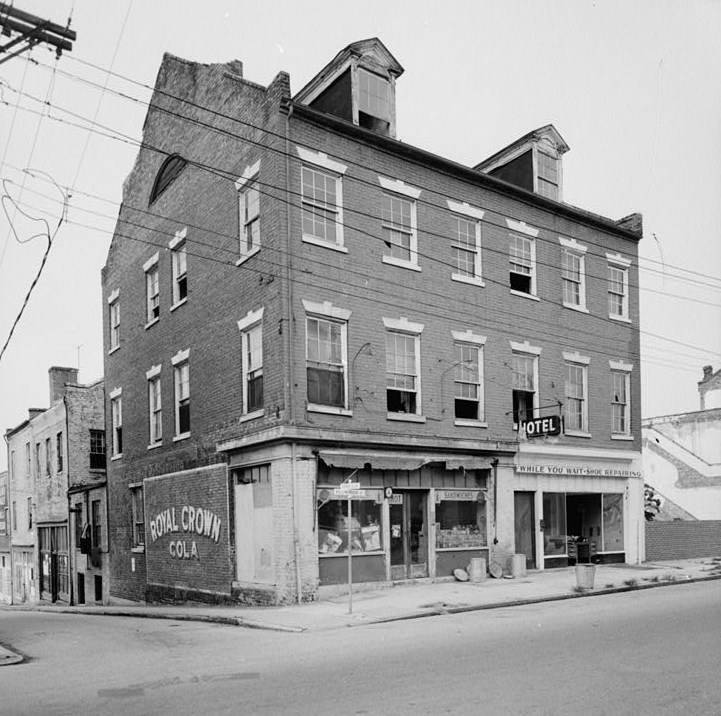
- Nathaniel Friend Jr. House, HABS Photo

- Location within Virginia Location within the United States
- Location: 27-29 Bollingbrook St., Petersburg, Virginia
- Coordinates: 37°13′58″N 77°24′14″W
- Area: less than one acre
- Built: 1815-1816
- Architectural style: Federal
- NRHP reference No.: 76002227
- VLR No.: 123-0066

Significant dates
- Added to NRHP: August 11, 1976
- Designated VLR: April 20, 1976

Nathaniel Friend House is a historic home located at Petersburg, Virginia. It was built in 1815–1816, and is a 3 1/2-story, six-bay, Federal style brick commercial / residential building. It has a rear ell that may incorporate the original kitchen and smokehouse. The house was built by the wealthy import-export merchant, Nathaniel Friend Jr., who also served as the mayor of Petersburg in 1812–13.

It was listed on the National Register of Historic Places in 1976. It is located in the Petersburg Old Town Historic District.
