= Ann Wager =

Teacher and schoolmistress in Colonial Williamsburg

Ann Wager (1716 – August 20, 1774) was a teacher and schoolmistress in colonial Williamsburg, Virginia.

She married William Wager, but was widowed in 1748. Wager was hired in 1760 to teach in the Williamsburg Bray School. Prior to this, Wager had been a tutor to white children in Williamsburg, and to the children of Carter Burwell at the Carter's Grove Plantation. At the Bray school she was paid a £20 annual salary, with the rent on her housing also being paid. In a 1765 letter to the school's British funders, Robert Carter Nicholas wrote that "the Mistress [Mrs. Anne Wager] is pretty much advanced in Years & I fear Labours of the School will shortly be too much for her." Nevertheless, Wager continued to teach at the Bray School until her death in 1774.
