= Appomattox Iron Works =

- U.S. National Register of Historic Places
- U.S. Historic district – Contributing property
- Virginia Landmarks Register
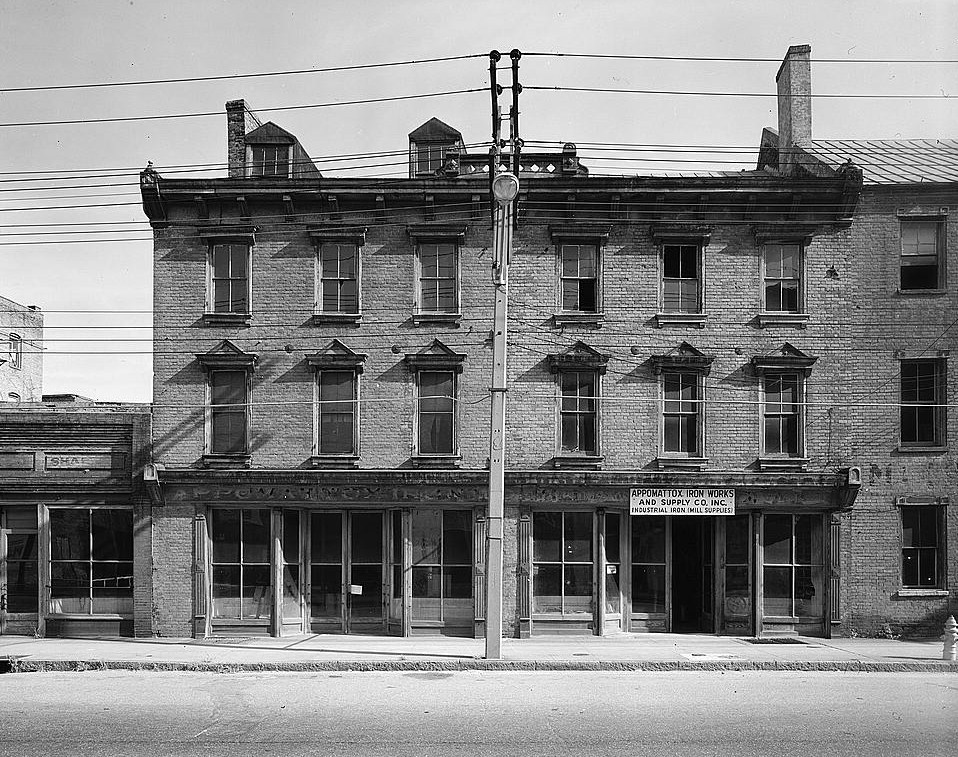
- Appomattox Iron Works, HABS Photo, 1974

- Location within Virginia Location within the United States
- Location: 20-28 Old Street, Petersburg, Virginia
- Coordinates: 37°13′58″N 77°24′22″W
- Area: less than one acre
- Built: c. 1815
- Architectural style: Federal
- NRHP reference No.: 76002226
- VLR No.: 123-0087

Significant dates
- Added to NRHP: August 11, 1976
- Designated VLR: April 20, 1976

Appomattox Iron Works is a historic iron foundry complex in Petersburg, Virginia. The complex consists of nine buildings: the machine shop, the mill store, the supply room, the pipe shop, the carpenter's shop and pattern shop, the core room, the foundry building, the blacksmith's shop, and the ruins of a stable. The machine shop at 28 Old Street is the oldest structure in the complex. It was built between 1810 and 1825, and is a three-story, four-bay, Federal style brick building. The Appomattox Iron Works operated at this location from 1899 until 1972.

The complex was designated a Virginia State Landmark and listed on the National Register of Historic Places in 1976. It is located in the Petersburg Old Town Historic District.
