= James Semple House =

Historic house in Virginia, United States

- U.S. National Register of Historic Places
- U.S. National Historic Landmark
- U.S. National Historic Landmark District – Contributing property
- Virginia Landmarks Register
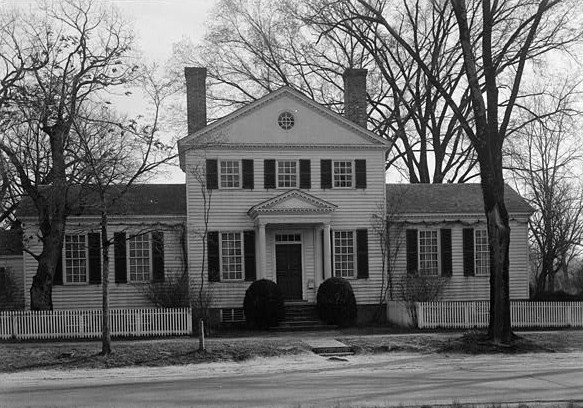
- James Semple House

- Location within Virginia Location within the United States
- Location: S side of Frances St. between Blair and Walker Sts., Williamsburg, Virginia
- Coordinates: 37°16′12″N 76°41′36″W
- Area: 1 acre (0.40 ha)
- Built: 1770
- Architect: Thomas Jefferson
- Part of: Williamsburg Historic District (ID66000925)
- NRHP reference No.: 70000864
- VLR No.: 137-0033

Significant dates
- Added to NRHP: April 15, 1970
- Designated NHL: April 15, 1970
- Designated NHLDCP: October 9, 1960
- Designated VLR: September 18, 1973

The James Semple House is a historic house on Francis Street in Colonial Williamsburg, Williamsburg, Virginia. Built about 1770, it is a prominent early example of Classical Revival residential architecture, whose design has been attributed to Thomas Jefferson. It was declared a National Historic Landmark in 1970.

== Description and history ==
The James Semple House stands in historic Colonial Williamsburg, a short way south of the Capitol on the south side of East Francis Street. It is a wood-frame structure, with a central two-story section flanked by single-story wings set at a recess. The central block is covered by a front-facing gabled roof with full pediment, while the wings have side-facing gables. The central block is three bays wide, with a center entrance topped by a transom window and sheltered by a gabled portico. The portico is supported by Doric columns, and has a dentillated pediment and eaves.

The exact date of construction of this house is uncertain, but was probably around 1770. Early owners of the house were the Harrison family, and Benjamin Harrison V sold it sometime before 1769 to Dr. William Pasteur. Surviving documentation suggests that a house may have been standing on the lot when Pasteur acquired it, but it is also possible that Pasteur had the house built after purchasing the land. Its designer is also uncertain, and has been ascribed by some authorities to Thomas Jefferson on the basis of its similarity to other known Jefferson designs. The house was acquired in 1801 by Dr. James Semple. Future U.S. president John Tyler, a relative of the Semples, resided here while attending school. After passing through several other owners, it was purchased by Colonial Williamsburg in 1928.

At the time of its landmark designation in 1970, it was used by Colonial Williamsburg as executive housing.

== See also ==
- List of National Historic Landmarks in Virginia
- National Register of Historic Places listings in Williamsburg, Virginia
