= Petersburg Old Town Historic District =

Historic district in Virginia, United States

- U.S. National Register of Historic Places
- U.S. Historic district
- Virginia Landmarks Register
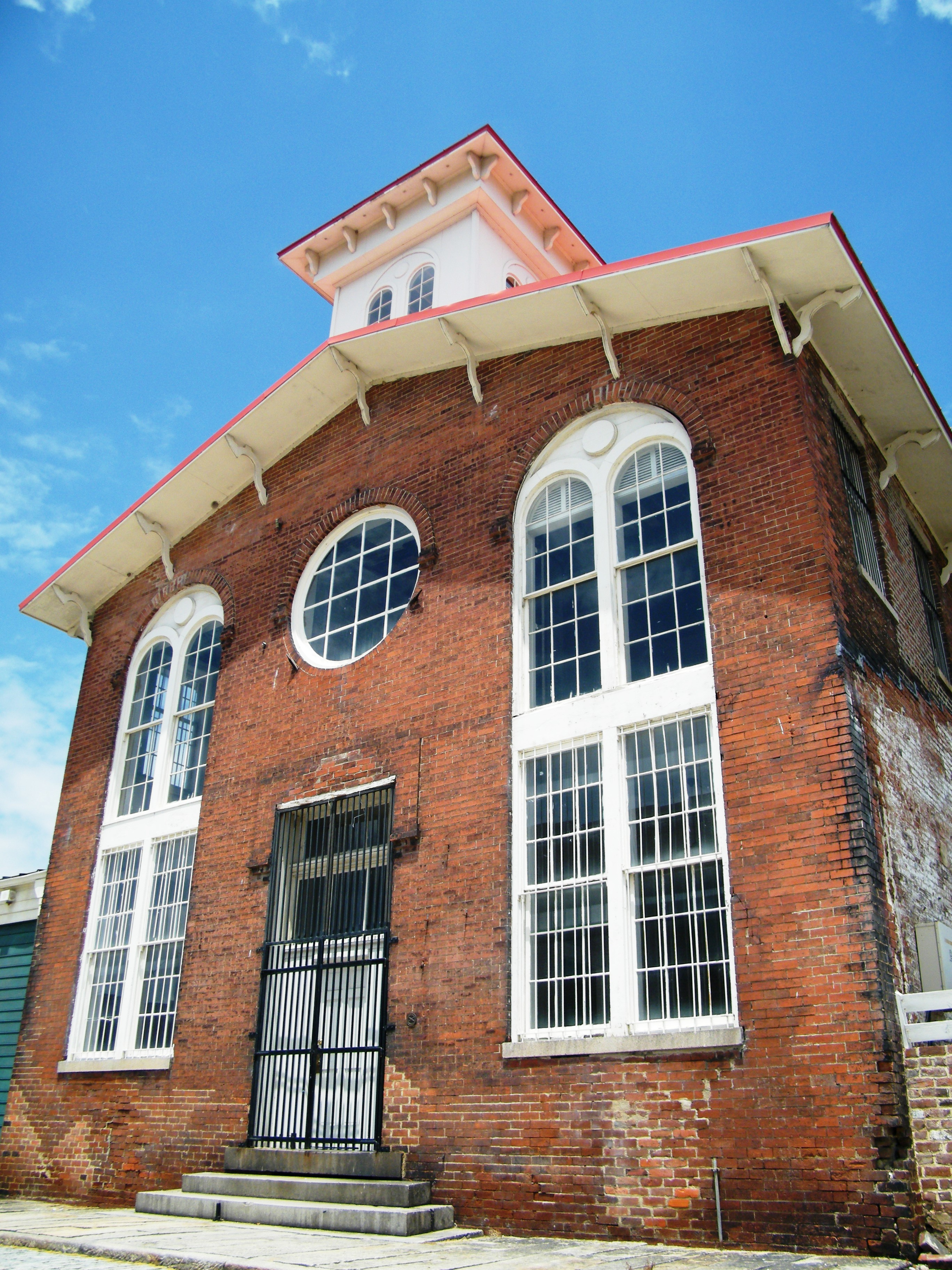
- South Side Railroad Depot, June 2011

- Location within Virginia Location within the United States
- Location: U.S. 1 and VA 36; 241 4th St., 223-225 Henry St., 230 and 316 E. Bank St., Petersburg, Virginia
- Coordinates: 37°13′55″N 77°24′37″W
- Area: 190 acres (77 ha)
- Built: 1800
- Architect: Multiple
- Architectural style: Mixed (more Than 2 Styles From Different Periods)
- NRHP reference No.: 80004314, 08000873 (Boundary Increase)
- VLR No.: 123-0097

Significant dates
- Added to NRHP: July 4, 1980, September 12, 2008 (Boundary Increase)
- Designated VLR: November 20, 1979; June 19, 2008

Petersburg Old Town Historic District is a national historic district located at Petersburg, Virginia. The district includes 174 contributing buildings located in the oldest section of Petersburg. It includes a varied collection of late 18th- through 20th-century architecture. Notable buildings include the Strachan-Harrison house (mid- to late-18th century), the John F. May house (c. 1810), South Side Railroad Depot (c. 1853), High Street United Methodist Church (1844, 1897), Church of Christ (1925), and the Powell Manufacturing Co. Located in the district and separately listed are the Appomattox Iron Works, City Market, Exchange Building, Farmers' Bank and Nathaniel Friend House.

It was listed on the National Register of Historic Places in 1980, with a boundary increase in 2008.
