= John M. Dawson (Virginia politician) =

American politician and minister from Virginia

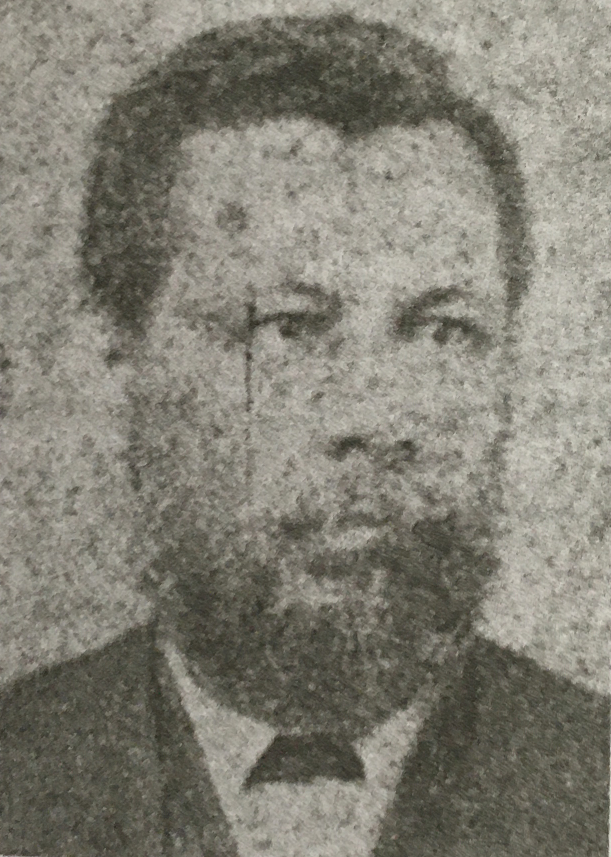

Member of the Virginia Senate
- In office 1874–1877
- Preceded by: Daniel M. Norton
- Succeeded by: Daniel M. Norton

Personal details
- Born: September 16, 1829
- Died: July 15, 1913 (aged 83) Williamsburg
- Party: Republican

John Montgomery Dawson (September 16, 1829 – July 15, 1913) was a minister and a state legislator. He served in the Virginia Senate during the Reconstruction era, from 1874 - 1877.

== Early life and education ==
He was born September 16, 1829, as a slave in Alexandria, New York to Samuel and Winney Dawson, later escaping to Cato, New York.

He studied at the Oberlin College, Ohio from 1862 until 1865 obtaining a Master of Arts.

== Military service and career ==
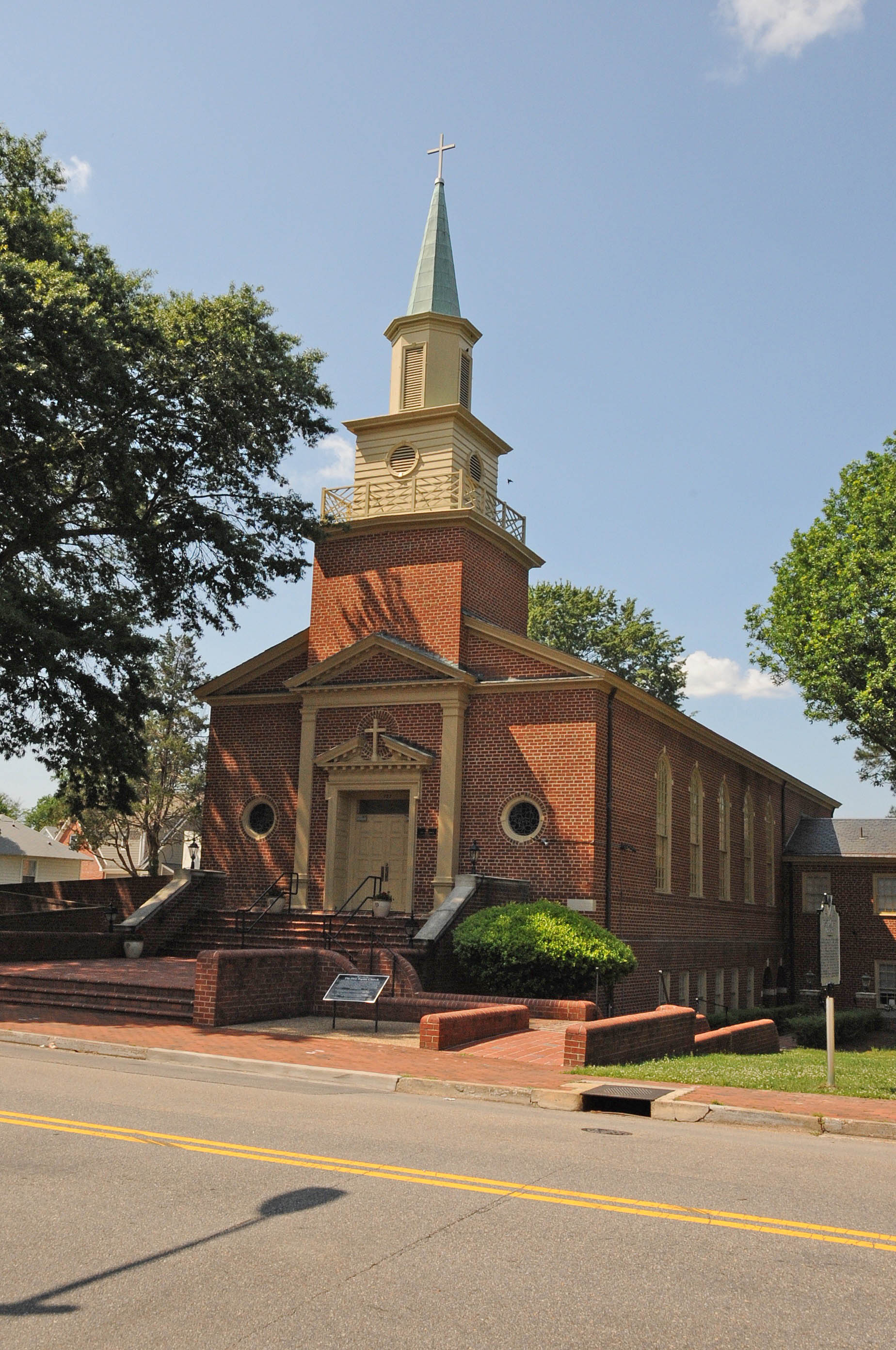
First Baptist Church (Williamsburg, Virginia)

He served in the American Civil War from September 1864 until discharged after then end of the war, serving in the 3rd New York Artillery Regiment. After the war he started as the pastor at the First Baptist Church in Williamsburg from April 1866, also soon becoming the regional Baptist associations leader.

He started his political career joining the Republican Party sometime before July 1873 at which time he was elected to the Republican State Committee, he was a member of the State central committee for the Second District. There was a split in the local Republican Party for the candidate for the next senate session with one part supporting Dawson and another supporting the incumbent Daniel M. Norton.

Dawson won and he served in the Virginia Senate for a single term from 1874 - 1877 representing Charles City, Elizabeth City, James City, Warwick, and York counties. He did not run for re-election at the end of his term and Norton regained the seat. During his term he served on the Committee on Public Institutions 1874–75, and then the Committee on County, City, and Town Organizations 1876–77, both times as the lowest-ranking seat.

In 1877 he was appointed as a curator of the Hampton Normal School (now Hampton University), and in 1880 he was an elector for Virginia for the 1880 United States presidential election.

He was selected to run for Congress in 1882 although he had not solicited the position but accepted the nomination as he considered it "the duty of every good republican to aid by every honorable means in his power in securing an increase of true and tried in the Congressional delegation from this State". He was unsuccessful coming a distant third and then again failing at a second attempt the following year.

He was elected as the treasurer of the James City County and the city or Williamsburg, but in 1893 he was defeated in the election for continuation in that position. He then decided to devote his time and effort to the church and advising people on how to be better citizens and to avoid politics.

== Death ==
After pastoring at the First Baptist Church until 1912 he was forced to resign due to his age and health. He took the rejection of his congregation badly and decided not to have his funeral at his church of over 45 years. He died the next year on July 15, 1913, in the early hours while at his home on Francis Street, Williamsburg. He owned property in Williamsburg as well as about sixty acres of land within James City County.

== See also ==
- African American officeholders from the end of the Civil War until before 1900
