= Farmers' Bank (Petersburg, Virginia) =

Historic commercial building in Virginia, United States

- U.S. National Register of Historic Places
- U.S. Historic district – Contributing property
- Virginia Landmarks Register
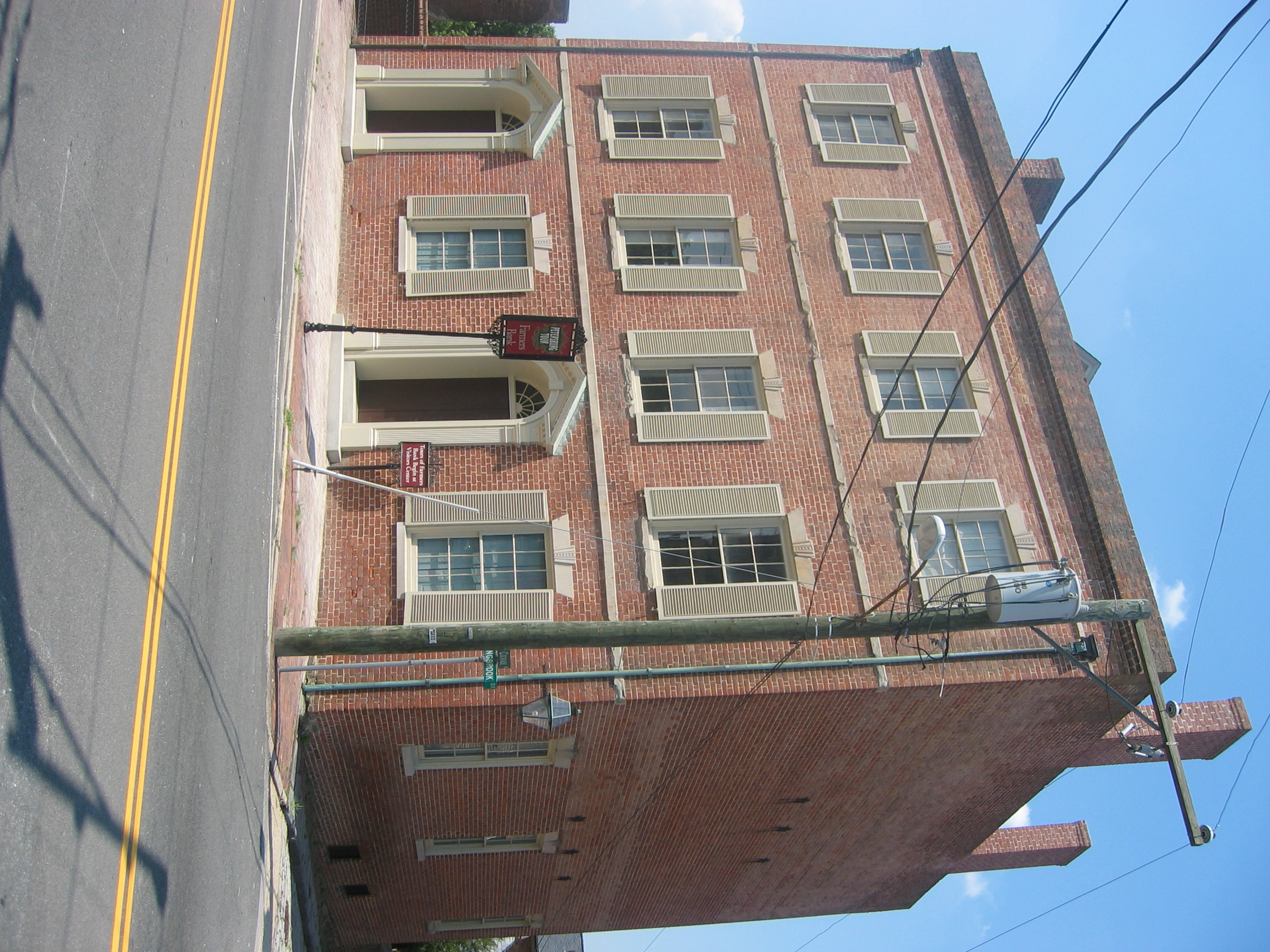
- Farmers' Bank in Petersburg

- Location within Virginia Location within the United States
- Location: NW corner of Bollingbrook St. and Cockade Alley, Petersburg, Virginia
- Coordinates: 37°13′57″N 77°24′15″W
- Area: 9 acres (3.6 ha)
- Built: 1817
- Architectural style: Federal
- NRHP reference No.: 72001515
- VLR No.: 123-0067

Significant dates
- Added to NRHP: April 13, 1972
- Designated VLR: January 18, 1972

Farmers' Bank is the first bank museum of its kind found in Virginia. Farmers' Bank was incorporated in 1812 and the Petersburg, Virginia branch opened in 1817.

== History ==
The three-story building, built in the Federal style, was a frequent meeting place for the community. The first floor held the banking area, including the vault, while the third floor was home to the bank manager and his family. The bank maintained operations through the American Civil War and closed by order of the Virginia General Assembly in 1866.

It was listed on the National Register of Historic Places in 1972. It is located in the Petersburg Old Town Historic District.

== Preservation ==
The property served various functions throughout the next hundred years, until it was acquired by Preservation Virginia in the 1960s. Preservation Virginia undertook restoration of the building, and reopened it as a museum and visitors center.

The building now houses the Petersburg Visitors Center. Visitors can see a printing press and scales for weighing gold. The living quarters on the third floor has also been restored.
