= Peyton Randolph House =

Historic house in Virginia, United States

- U.S. National Register of Historic Places
- U.S. National Historic Landmark
- U.S. National Historic Landmark District – Contributing property
- Virginia Landmarks Register
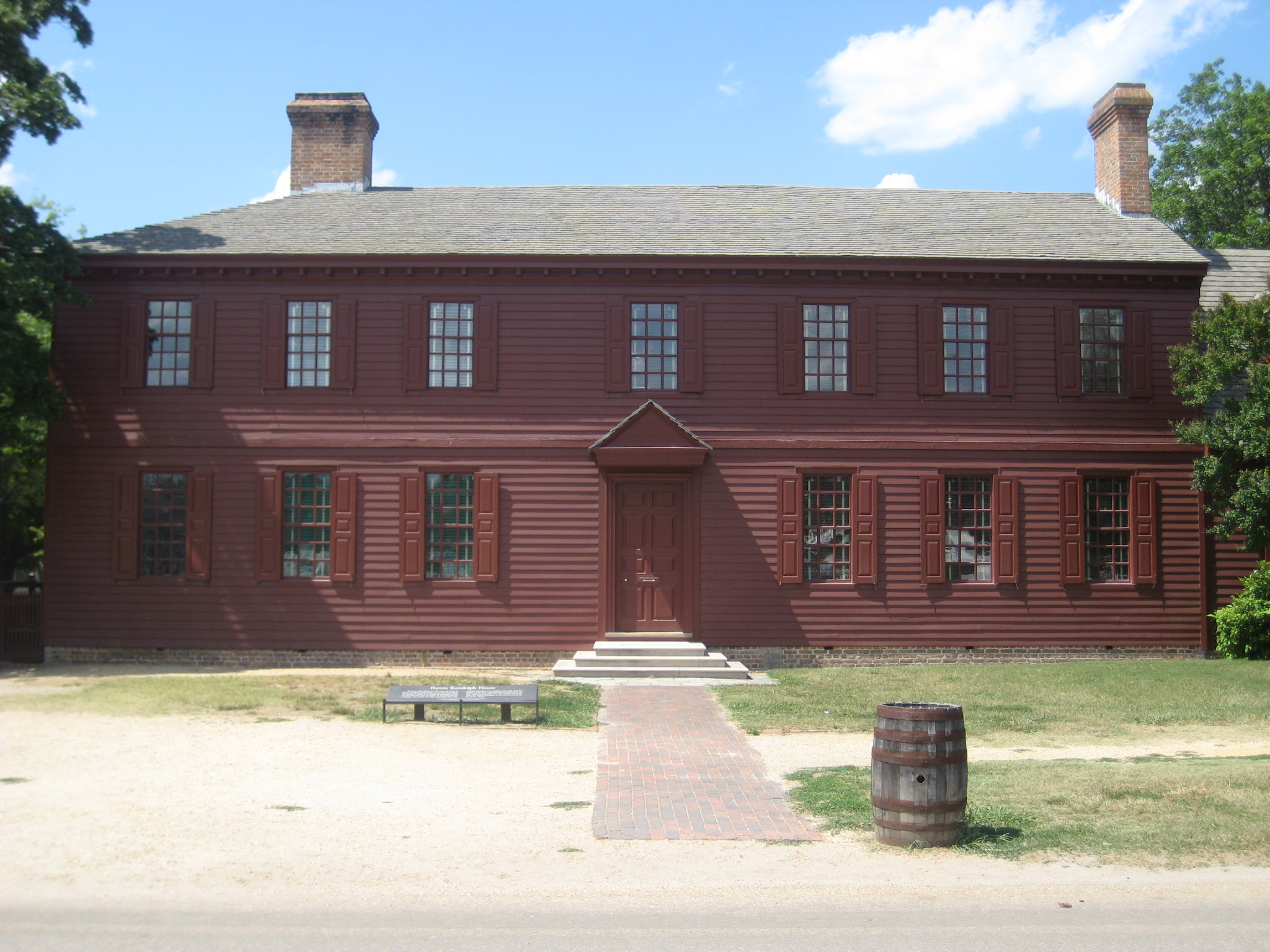

- Location within Virginia Location within the United States
- Location: Corner of Nicholson and N. England Sts., Colonial Williamsburg, Williamsburg, Virginia, U.S.
- Coordinates: 37°16′19″N 76°42′0″W
- Built: 1715
- Architectural style: Georgian
- Part of: Williamsburg Historic District (ID66000925)
- NRHP reference No.: 70000863
- VLR No.: 137-0032

Significant dates
- Added to NRHP: April 15, 1970"National Register Information System". National Register of Historic Places. National Park Service. January 23, 2007.
- Designated NHL: April 15, 1970
- Designated NHLDCP: October 9, 1960
- Designated VLR: September 18, 1973

The Peyton Randolph House, also known as the Randolph-Peachey House, is a historic house museum in Colonial Williamsburg, Virginia. Its oldest portion dating to about 1715, it is one of the museum's oldest surviving buildings. It was designated a National Historic Landmark in 1973 as the home of Founding Father Peyton Randolph (1721–1775), the first and third President of the Continental Congress.

== Description and history ==
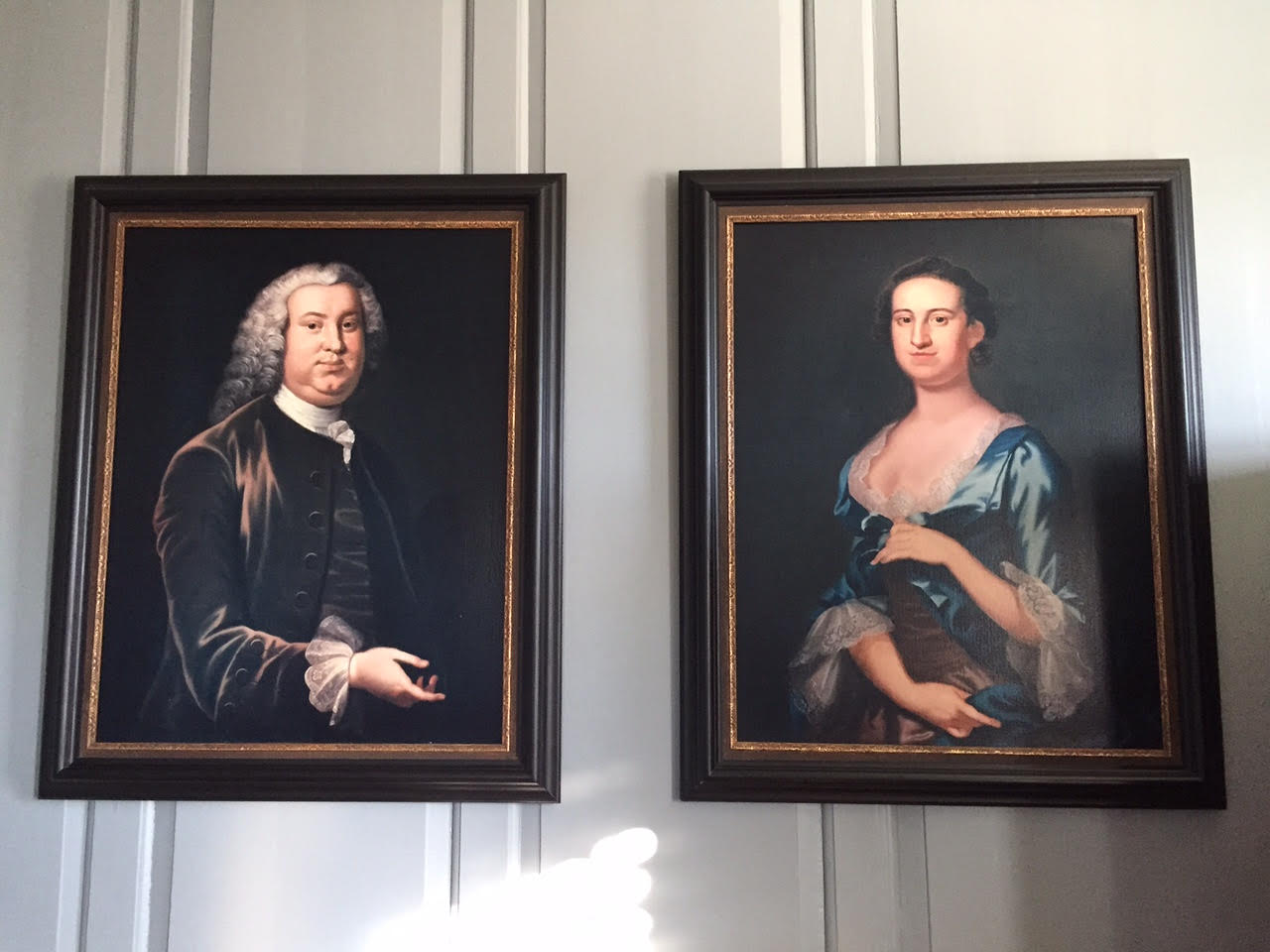
Portraits of Peyton Randolph and wife, Betty Randolph

The Randolph House is located in near the center of Colonial Williamsburg, at the northeast corner of Nicholson and North England Streets. It is a two-story wood-frame structure, appearing as a seven-bay main block with a single-story ell to the east. The main block is capped by a roof that is hipped at the western end and gabled at the eastern. The main entrance is set in the center bay, sheltered by a gabled hood. Windows are arranged slightly out of symmetry, a product of the building's construction history. The building interior retains original 18th century woodwork, and a marble fireplace mantel in its central section.

The oldest portion of the house is the western half of the main block, which was built about 1715 by William Robertson. It was purchased by Sir John Randolph in 1724, who also purchased a lot to the east, where he built a second house. Randolph's son Peyton joined the two structures together by building the middle section. The eastern section did not have internal access to the rest of the house, and may have been used by the younger Randolph as an office. The western section of the house originally had a fully hipped roof, and the area between it and the middle section's gable was used as a water collection area, housing a cistern that is still found in the building's attic.

During the American Civil War, the home was owned by the Peachy Family, and was used as a hospital for Union and Confederate troops wounded during the Battle of Williamsburg on May 5, 1862.

The building was restored by Colonial Williamsburg 1938–1940. The original east wing, in poor condition, was torn down and a reconstruction built. That area was determined to contain at least two Native American Indian burial sites and pottery. These graves were disturbed during the construction of the tunnel for the Colonial National Parkway in 1941.

In 1970 the house was declared a National Historic Landmark, for its well-preserved early 18th-century architecture, and for its association with prominent Randolph family.

== See also ==
- List of National Historic Landmarks in Virginia
- National Register of Historic Places listings in Williamsburg, Virginia
