= City Market (Petersburg, Virginia) =

Historic commercial building in Virginia, US

- U.S. National Register of Historic Places
- U.S. Historic district – Contributing property
- Virginia Landmarks Register
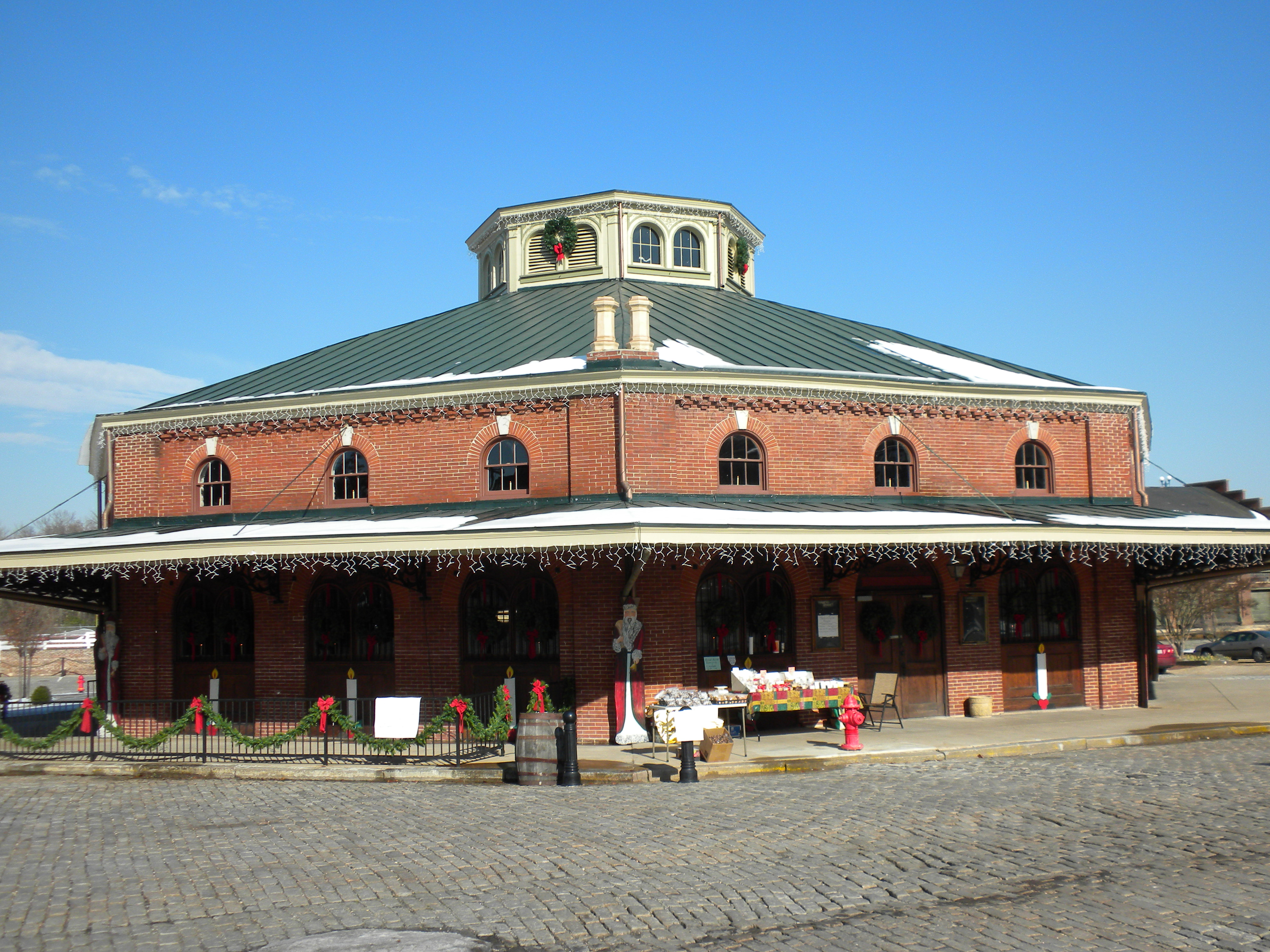

- Location within Virginia Location within the United States
- Location: Rock, W. Old and River Sts., and Cockade Alley, Petersburg, Virginia
- Coordinates: 37°14′0″N 77°24′18″W
- Built: 1878–1879
- Architectural style: Octagon Mode
- Part of: Petersburg Old Town Historic District (ID80004314)
- NRHP reference No.: 69000345
- VLR No.: 123-0050

Significant dates
- Added to NRHP: June 11, 1969
- Designated CP: July 04, 1980
- Designated VLR: November 5, 1968

City Market, also known as Farmers Market, is an historic public market located at 9 East Old Street in Petersburg, Virginia. It was built in 1878–1879 through a land given in trust by merchant Robert Balling. The City Market is an octagonal brick building. It measures 93 feet in diameter and is surrounded by a large metal canopy supported on elaborate iron brackets. The market’s high-rafted interior was originally where perishables were sold, whereas the outside stalls were for produce.

It was added to the National Register of Historic Places in 1969. It is located in the Petersburg Old Town Historic District.
