= Gowan Pamphlet =

American former slave and minister

The Reverend Gowan Pamphlet
- Pastor of First Baptist Church
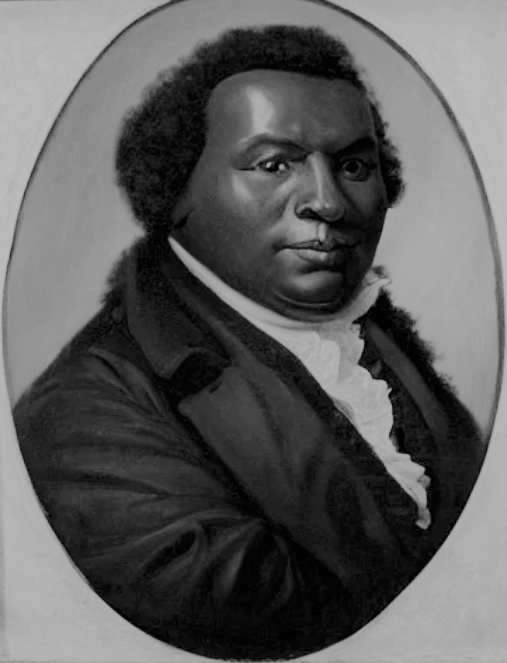
- Portrait, c. 1790–1800
- In office: 1781–1807

Orders
- Ordination: 1772

Personal details
- Born: 1748
- Died: 1807 (aged 58–59) Williamsburg, Virginia, U.S.
- Denomination: Baptist
- Occupation: Minister, preacher, formerly enslaved person

Gowan Pamphlet (1748–1807) was an American Baptist minister and freedman who founded the Black Baptist Church (now known as First Baptist Church) in Williamsburg, Virginia, United States. He was one of the first and, for a time, the only ordained African American preacher of any denomination in the American Colonies.

== Early life ==
Gowan Pamphlet was born into slavery in 1748.

In the 1770s, he was enslaved in the home of a tavern owner, the widow Jane Vobe (1733–1786). Multiple Black persons enslaved by Vobe "learned to read the Bible and took part in formal Church of England services at Bruton Parish Church," possibly including Pamphlet. During this time, Pamphlet began his pastoral ministry. Pamphlet was forced to work alongside employees and slaves in Vobe's 1772 King's Arms Tavern in Williamsburg. Before the Revolution, Pamphlet catered to William Byrd III, Friedrich Wilhelm von Steuben, and George Washington and "became skilled in the manners, etiquette, and services that genteel diners and travelers expected."

== Ministry ==
Pamphlet was inspired by the teachings of blind disabled preacher, Moses "Daddy Moses" Wilkinson, a radical Methodist preacher who combined Old Testament divination with African religious traditions such as conjuring and sorcery.

During the American Revolutionary War and inspired by the First Great Awakening, in the 1770s, Pamphlet began secretly preaching a message of equality to a congregation of free and enslaved African Americans on wooded land at Green Spring Plantation on the outskirts of the city.

By 1781, the informal congregation grew to over 200 members. With his owner's permission, Pamphlet was ordained in 1772, becoming one of the first and only ordained black preachers of any denomination in the country.

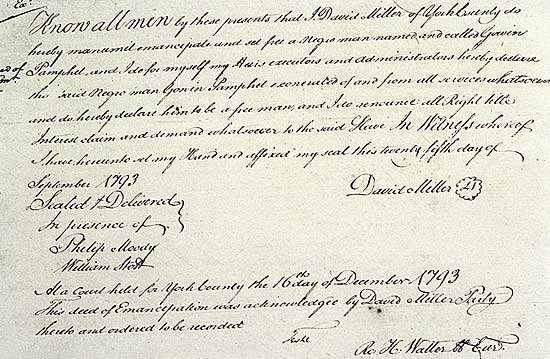
Original Manumission for Gowan Pamphlet, c. 1793

Pamphlet remained in Williamsburg until 1786 when he moved with his owner to Manchester, Chesterfield County. He resided there until Vobe's death.

1793 was a significant year in the life of Pamphlet; he returned to Williamsburg with his new owner (and Vobe's son) David Miller, returned to preach to his informal congregation and promote equality, and was freed by his owner through a deed of manumission in September 1793.

The deed is the first listing of his chosen surname, "Pamphlet," which he is believed to have chosen after reading Thomas Paine's pamphlet, Common Sense. In that same year, Pamphlet's informal congregation was formally received by the Dover Baptist Association, establishing them as an official church congregation.

By the early 1800s, Pamphlet was a landowner in Williamsburg and owned 14 acres in James City County. He continued to serve as the minister of his congregation, which amassed an estimated 500 members by the time of his death.

== Death ==
Pamphlet died in 1807 at age 58 or 59 in Williamsburg, Virginia.

== Legacy ==
In 1962, Martin Luther King Jr. visited Williamsburg and preached at First Baptist Church, where he paid tribute to the founding of the church and its importance in the broader civil rights movement.

Colonial Williamsburg tells the stories of 18th-century African Americans including interpreters in the Revolutionary City and Sharing the Spotlight programs portraying Pamphlet.

In 2010, Pamphlet was recognized as an "African American Trailblazers" honoree by the Library of Virginia.

A state historical marker (Marker Number W 110.) was erected in 2020 by the Virginia Department of Historic Resources to commemorate Pamphlet's life and legacy. The marker is located at the intersection of North Nassau and Scotland Streets in Williamsburg, close to the original site of the church.
