= List of National Historic Landmarks in Virginia =

This is a list of National Historic Landmarks in Virginia. There are currently 126 National Historic Landmarks (NHLs), and 2 former NHLs.

== Key ==
	National Historic Landmark
^{†}	National Historic Landmark District
^{#}	National Historic Site, National Historical Park, National Memorial, or National Monument
^{*}	Delisted Landmark

== Current landmarks ==
The National Historic Landmarks (NHLs) are widely distributed across Virginia's 95 counties and 39 independent cities.

	Landmark name	Image	Date designated	Location	County	Description
1^{†}	Alexandria Historic District	Alexandria Historic District	November 13, 1966 (#66000928)	Alexandria; 38°48′12″N 77°02′47″W	Alexandria (city)	Comprises the central portion of Alexandria, VirginiaL
2	Aquia Church	Aquia Church	July 5, 1991 (#69000282)	Garrisonville; 38°27′53″N 77°24′11″W	Stafford	Mid-18th-century church
3	Azurest South	Azurest South	December 13, 2024 (#100011351)	2900 Boisseau St. 37°14′26″N 77°25′02″W	Chesterfield	
4	Bacon's Castle	Bacon's Castle	October 9, 1960 (#66000849)	Bacon's Castle; 37°06′32″N 76°43′20″W	Surry	One of the oldest brick buildings in Virginia
5^{†}	Ball's Bluff Battlefield and National Cemetery	Ball's Bluff Battlefield and National Cemetery	April 27, 1984 (#84003880)	Leesburg; 39°07′53″N 77°31′45″W	Loudoun	Site of an embarrassing Union defeat early in the American Civil War, caused by inept generalship, after which drowned troops' bodies floated down the Potomac River to Washington, D.C.
6	Banneker (Benjamin) SW-9 Intermediate Boundary Stone	Banneker (Benjamin) SW-9 Intermediate Boundary Stone	May 11, 1976 (#76002094)	Arlington; 38°52′58″N 77°09′33″W	Arlington	A boundary stone associated with Benjamin Banneker, (1731–1806), an African American surveyor, mathematician and astronomer who assisted Andrew Ellicott during the first two months of Ellicott's 1791–1792 survey of the boundaries of the original District of Columbia.
7	Barracks, Virginia Military Institute	Barracks, Virginia Military Institute	December 21, 1965 (#66000956)	Lexington; 37°47′25″N 79°26′19″W	Lexington (city)	Gothic style cadet barracks building on the grounds of Virginia Military Institute
8	Berkeley	Berkeley	November 11, 1971 (#71001040)	Charles City; 37°19′18″N 77°10′54″W	Charles City	One of the great plantations of Virginia, associated with Presidents William Henry Harrison and Benjamin Harrison.
9	Berry Hill	Berry Hill	November 11, 1971 (#69000246)	South Boston; 36°41′48″N 78°56′39″W	Halifax	A Greek Revival plantation mansion, imitating the Parthenon
10	Blue Ridge Parkway	Blue Ridge Parkway	December 13, 2024 (#100011353)	Blue Ridge Parkway through Virginia and North Carolina; 38°01′51″N 78°51′28″W	Augusta, Nelson, Rockbridge, Amherst, Bedford, Botetourt, Roanoke (county), Floyd, Patrick, Carroll, and Grayson	
11	Brandon	Brandon	April 15, 1970 (#69000271)	Burrowsville; 37°15′27″N 76°59′36″W	Prince George	Plantation tended from 1614 on, with unusual brick mansion in style of Palladio's "Roman Country House" completed in 1760s
12^{†}	Bremo Historic District	Bremo Historic District	November 11, 1971 (#69000241)	Bremo Bluff; 37°43′31″N 78°19′47″W	Fluvanna	James River plantation with mansion probably designed by Thomas Jefferson
13	Bruton Parish Church	Bruton Parish Church	April 15, 1970 (#70000861)	Williamsburg; 37°16′09″N 76°42′10″W	Williamsburg (city)	Earliest church in the British American colonies to reflect the infusion of English Renaissance style.
14	Camden	Camden	November 11, 1971 (#69000228)	Port Royal; 38°09′48″N 77°09′41″W	Caroline	Two-story Italian villa featuring such 19th-century innovations as a central heating system, gas lights, inside toilets, and shower baths.
15^{†}	Camp Hoover	Camp Hoover	June 7, 1988 (#88001825)	Graves Mill; 38°29′31″N 78°25′16″W	Madison	President Herbert Hoover's rustic presidential retreat, also known as Rapidan Camp.
16	Cape Henry Lighthouse	Cape Henry Lighthouse	January 29, 1964 (#66000910)	Virginia Beach; 36°55′26″N 76°00′30″W	Virginia Beach (city)	First lighthouse to be erected by the Federal Government.
17	Carter's Grove	Carter's Grove	April 15, 1970 (#69000249)	Williamsburg; 37°12′25″N 76°37′29″W	James City	Georgian country house and plantation near Williamsburg.
18^{#}	Cedar Creek Battlefield and Belle Grove Plantation	Cedar Creek Battlefield and Belle Grove Plantation	August 11, 1969 (#69000243)	Middletown and Strasburg; 39°01′11″N 78°18′02″W	Frederick and Warren	Site of the American Civil War battle of Cedar Creek and the Belle Grove Plantation. Divided into two pieces by Interstate 81
19	Christ Church	Christ Church	April 15, 1970 (#70000899)	Alexandria; 38°48′23″N 77°02′51″W	Alexandria (city)	1773 Georgian brick church
20	Christ Church	Christ Church	May 30, 1961 (#66000841)	Irvington; 37°40′36″N 76°25′07″W	Lancaster	Example of British Colonial ecclesiastical architecture.
21	City Hall	City Hall	November 11, 1971 (#69000327)	Richmond; 37°32′16″N 77°25′59″W	Richmond (city)	Example of the High Victorian Gothic style.
22	Patsy Cline House	Patsy Cline House	January 13, 2021 (#100006248)	Winchester; 39°10′41″N 78°09′53″W	Winchester (city)	Childhood home of country music singer Patsy Cline.
23	Confederate Capitol	Confederate Capitol	December 19, 1960 (#66000911)	Richmond; 37°32′20″N 77°26′01″W	Richmond (city)	From July 1861 to April 1865, the Confederate Congress met here; state capitol before and after the war
24	Charles Richard Drew House	Charles Richard Drew House	May 11, 1976 (#76002095)	Arlington; 38°52′21″N 77°05′14″W	Arlington	Home of Dr. Charles R. Drew, an African American physician and researcher whose leadership on stockpiling blood plasma saved lives in World War II
25	Drydock Number One, Norfolk Naval Shipyard	Drydock Number One, Norfolk Naval Shipyard	November 11, 1971 (#70000862)	Portsmouth; 36°49′07″N 76°17′35″W	Portsmouth (city)	Union frigate USS Merrimack was rebuilt by the Confederates in this drydock, becoming the ironclad CSS Virginia. Now part of Norfolk Naval Shipyard.
26	Egyptian Building	Egyptian Building	November 11, 1971 (#69000321)	Richmond; 37°32′18″N 77°25′45″W	Richmond (city)	First permanent home of the Medical Department of Hampden-Sydney College
27	Elsing Green	Elsing Green	November 11, 1971 (#69000252)	Tunstall; 37°36′09″N 77°03′04″W	King William	Georgian plantation house built by Carter Braxton
28	Exchange	Exchange	November 11, 1971 (#69000322)	Petersburg; 37°13′55″N 77°24′19″W	Petersburg (city)	Two-story Greek Revival structure with a Doric portico.
29	Eyre Hall	Eyre Hall	March 2, 2012 (#69000265)	Cheriton; 37°13′48″N 77°24′16″W	Northampton	A private plantation in the hands of the Eyre family since 1668.
30	Five Forks Battlefield	Five Forks Battlefield	December 19, 1960 (#66000830)	Petersburg; 37°08′21″N 77°37′23″W	Dinwiddie	Site of Battle of Five Forks, where Lee's flank was turned, leading to virtual end of the American Civil War in 1865.
31	Gerald R. Ford Jr. House	Gerald R. Ford Jr. House	December 17, 1985 (#85003048)	Alexandria; 38°48′40″N 77°04′49″W	Alexandria (city)	House of President Gerald R. Ford.
32^{†}	Fort Monroe	Fort Monroe	December 19, 1960 (#66000912)	Hampton; 37°00′13″N 76°18′27″W	Hampton (city)	Fort Monroe was completed in 1834, and is named in honor of U.S. President James Monroe. Completely surrounded by a moat, the six-sided stone fort was an active Army post until 2011. The fort was redesignated as Fort Monroe National Monument in 2011.
33^{†}	Fort Myer Historic District	Fort Myer Historic District	November 28, 1972 (#72001380)	Arlington; 38°52′49″N 77°04′47″W	Arlington	U.S. Army post adjacent to Arlington National Cemetery.
34	Franklin & Armfield Office	Franklin & Armfield Office	June 2, 1978 (#78003146)	Alexandria; 38°48′07″N 77°03′17″W	Alexandria (city)	Largest slave trading firm in the antebellum South
35	Gadsby's Tavern	Gadsby's Tavern	November 4, 1963 (#66000913)	Alexandria; 38°48′13″N 77°02′38″W	Alexandria (city)	Original tavern was a central part of the social, economic, political, and educational life of the city of Alexandria, and the United States. (Try Gadsby's Tavern Museum)
36	Ellen Glasgow House	Ellen Glasgow House	November 11, 1971 (#71001041)	Richmond; 37°32′27″N 77°26′42″W	Richmond (city)	Residence of author Ellen Glasgow
37	Carter Glass House	Carter Glass House	December 8, 1976 (#76002183)	Lynchburg; 37°24′48″N 79°08′51″W	Lynchburg (city)	A home of influential congressman and senator Carter Glass
38^{†}	Green Springs Historic District	Green Springs Historic District	May 30, 1974 (#73002036)	Zion Crossroads; 38°00′55″N 78°09′51″W	Louisa	Rural manor houses and related buildings.
39	Greenway Court	Greenway Court	October 9, 1960 (#66000829)	White Post; 39°02′40″N 78°07′09″W	Clarke	Remnants of 5,000,000-acre (20,000 km^{2}) estate of Thomas Fairfax, 6th Lord Fairfax of Cameron, only British peer in America, where George Washington worked as a surveyor
40	Gunston Hall	Gunston Hall	December 19, 1960 (#66000832)	Lorton; 38°38′49″N 77°08′47″W	Fairfax	Home of the United States Founding Father George Mason.
41^{†}	Hampton Institute	Hampton Institute	May 30, 1974 (#69000323)	Hampton; 37°01′17″N 76°20′14″W	Hampton (city)	Hampton University began in 1868 as a teacher training school to train young black men and women.
42	Hanover County Courthouse	Hanover County Courthouse	November 7, 1973 (#69000247)	Hanover Court House; 37°45′40″N 77°22′03″W	Hanover	This Georgian courthouse has been used continuously since its completion around 1735. It was here that, in 1763, Patrick Henry argued and won THE PARSON'S CAUSE, a case involving religious liberty in the Colony.
43	Holly-Knoll-Robert R. Moton House	Holly-Knoll-Robert R. Moton House	December 21, 1981 (#81000640)	Capahosic; 37°23′16″N 76°38′38″W	Gloucester	Retirement home of black educator Robert Russa Moton
44	The Homestead	The Homestead	July 17, 1991 (#84003494)	Hot Springs; 37°59′44″N 79°49′47″W	Bath	Example of Georgian and Colonial Revival architecture.
45	Humpback Bridge	Humpback Bridge	October 16, 2012 (#69000219)	Covington; 37°48′02″N 80°02′49″W	Alleghany	Oldest surviving covered bridge in Virginia; a rare example of a covered humpback bridge.
46^{†}	Jackson Ward Historic District	Jackson Ward Historic District	June 2, 1978 (#76002187)	Richmond; 37°32′54″N 77°26′27″W	Richmond (city)	A historically African-American neighborhood.
47	Stonewall Jackson Headquarters	Stonewall Jackson Headquarters	May 28, 1967 (#67000027)	Winchester; 39°11′17″N 78°09′58″W	Winchester (city)	Confederate Major General Jackson lived here during the 1861-1862 winter
48	Kenmore	Kenmore	April 15, 1970 (#69000325)	Fredericksburg; 38°17′35″N 77°27′59″W	Fredericksburg (city)	Home of Fielding Lewis
49	Lee Chapel, Washington and Lee University	Lee Chapel, Washington and Lee University	December 19, 1960 (#66000914)	Lexington; 37°47′08″N 79°26′32″W	Lexington (city)	Victorian Gothic brick chapel commemorates the years Robert E. Lee (1807–1870) served as president (1865–1870) of the college, then known as Washington College. Lee is buried in a chapel vault.
50	LIGHTSHIP NO. 101 "PORTSMOUTH"	LIGHTSHIP NO. 101 "PORTSMOUTH"	May 5, 1989 (#89001080)	Portsmouth; 36°50′12″N 76°17′55″W	Portsmouth (city)	Lightship Portsmouth, commissioned as Lightship 101, was first stationed at Cape Charles, Virginia.
51	Loudoun County Courthouse	Loudoun County Courthouse	December 13, 2024 (#100011372)	10 North King Street; 39°06′56″N 77°33′52″W	Loudoun	Site of the seminal Commonwealth of Virginia v. Crawford desegregation case in 1933-34.
52	Lunar Landing Research Facility	Lunar Landing Research Facility	October 3, 1985 (#85002808)	Hampton; 37°06′01″N 76°23′23″W	Hampton (city)	Crane at Langley Research Center used to practice Apollo lunar landings
53	Main Street Station and Trainshed	Main Street Station and Trainshed	December 8, 1976 (#70000867)	Richmond; 37°31′58″N 77°25′45″W	Richmond (city)	Station is an example of Beaux-Arts influence, and the trainshed is one of the last gable-roofed trainsheds in America.
54^{†}	Marlbourne	Marlbourne	July 19, 1964 (#66000837)	Richmond; 37°39′15″N 77°13′21″W	Hanover	Property of Confederate secessionist Edmund Ruffin
55	General George C. Marshall House	General George C. Marshall House	June 19, 1996 (#96000972)	Leesburg; 39°06′51″N 77°33′36″W	Loudoun	Last home of General George C. Marshall, who called it "Dodona Manor".
56	John Marshall House	John Marshall House	December 19, 1960 (#66000916)	Richmond; 37°32′27″N 77°25′59″W	Richmond (city)	Home of 4th Chief Justice John Marshall.
57^{†}	Cyrus McCormick Farm and Workshop	Cyrus McCormick Farm and Workshop	July 19, 1964 (#66000846)	Steele's Tavern; 37°56′02″N 79°13′04″W	Rockbridge	Home of the inventor of mechanical reaper.
58^{†}	Gari Melchers Home	Gari Melchers Home	December 21, 1965 (#66000848)	Falmouth; 38°19′30″N 77°28′23″W	Stafford	Residence and studio of painter Gari Melchers
59	Menokin	Menokin	November 11, 1971 (#69000276)	Warsaw; 38°00′25″N 76°48′04″W	Richmond	Home of Declaration of Independence signer Francis Lightfoot Lee.
60	Gen. William "Billy" Mitchell House	Gen. William "Billy" Mitchell House	December 8, 1976 (#76002112)	Middleburg; 38°57′40″N 77°44′44″W	Loudoun	Residence of General William "Billy" Mitchell, advocate of military air power.
61	James Monroe Law Office	James Monroe Law Office	November 13, 1966 (#66000917)	Fredericksburg; 38°18′09″N 77°27′42″W	Fredericksburg (city)	James Monroe used this structure as a law office from 1786 to 1789. It is now a museum.
62	James Monroe Tomb	James Monroe Tomb	November 11, 1971 (#71001044)	Richmond; 37°31′59″N 77°27′20″W	Richmond (city)	Tomb with "flamboyant and delicate tracery in cast iron" of President James Monroe
63	Monticello (Thomas Jefferson House)	Monticello (Thomas Jefferson House)	December 19, 1960 (#66000826)	Charlottesville; 38°00′30″N 78°27′12″W	Albemarle	Mansion of President Thomas Jefferson.
64	Montpelier (James Madison House)	Montpelier (James Madison House)	December 19, 1960 (#66000843)	Orange; 38°13′11″N 78°10′10″W	Orange	Residence of President James Madison.
65^{†}	Monument Avenue Historic District	Monument Avenue Historic District	December 9, 1997 (#70000883)	Richmond; 37°33′37″N 77°28′15″W	Richmond (city)	Broad tree-lined avenue with several impressive memorials.
66	Monumental Church	Monumental Church	November 11, 1971 (#69000326)	Richmond; 37°32′13″N 77°25′48″W	Richmond (city)	Early Greek Revival church.
67	Robert Russa Moton High School	Robert Russa Moton High School	August 5, 1998 (#95001177)	Farmville; 37°17′28″N 78°23′52″W	Prince Edward	Site of a 1951 student strike that led to court case striking down the practice of "separate but equal" schools; now a museum
68	Mount Airy	Mount Airy	October 9, 1960 (#66000845)	Warsaw; 37°58′20″N 76°47′29″W	Richmond	Stone plantation house. Burial place of Francis Lightfoot Lee.
69	Mount Vernon	Mount Vernon	December 19, 1960 (#66000833)	38°42′28″N 77°05′10″W	Fairfax	Plantation home of President George Washington.
70	Natural Bridge	Natural Bridge	August 5, 1998 (#97001401)	Natural Bridge; 37°37′32″N 79°32′43″W	Rockbridge	Natural rock arch, once owned by Thomas Jefferson.
71	New Kent School and George W. Watkins School	New Kent School and George W. Watkins School	August 7, 2001 (#01001046)	New Kent and Quinton; 37°31′56″N 77°08′29″W	New Kent	Pair of schools that represent the first wave of desegregation of southern schools in the decade after the 1954 Brown v. Board of Education Supreme Court decision. Focus of 1968 Green v. County School Board, in which the Supreme Court made specific demands to enforce its vision of desegregation.
72	Oak Hill	Oak Hill	December 19, 1960 (#66000842)	Leesburg; 38°59′51″N 77°37′13″W	Loudoun	Residence of President James Monroe
73	Oatlands	Oatlands	November 11, 1971 (#69000255)	Leesburg; 39°02′27″N 77°37′02″W	Loudoun	Notable Federal-style mansion designed and built by George Carter.
74	Pear Valley	Pear Valley	March 11, 2013 (#69000266)	Eastville; 37°23′48″N 75°55′29″W	Northampton	An early 18th century Chesapeake cottage.
75	Pentagon	Pentagon	October 5, 1992 (#89000932)	Arlington; 38°52′16″N 77°03′21″W	Arlington	Building is symbolic of national military power; a boundary increase was approved September 11, 2023.
76^{†}	Petersburg Breakthrough Battlefield	Petersburg Breakthrough Battlefield	February 17, 2006 (#06000239)	Petersburg; 37°11′22″N 77°28′33″W	Dinwiddie	Site of Union breakthrough that collapsed Confederate General Lee's fortifications from Petersburg to Richmond, on April 2, 1865.
77	Pittsylvania County Courthouse	Pittsylvania County Courthouse	May 4, 1987 (#81000643)	Chatham; 36°49′35″N 79°23′54″W	Pittsylvania	In 1878, Judge J.D. Coles was arrested for excluding African Americans citizens from serving as jurors, resulting in the Supreme Court case Ex Parte Virginia, extending the Equal Protection Clause of the United States Constitution to jury selection processes.
78^{†}	Pocahontas Exhibition Coal Mine	Pocahontas Exhibition Coal Mine	October 12, 1994 (#94001651)	Pocahontas; 37°18′29″N 81°20′59″W	Tazewell	1882 mine in the Pocahontas coalfield.
79	Poplar Forest	Poplar Forest	November 11, 1971 (#69000223)	Forest; 37°20′54″N 79°15′54″W	Bedford	Thomas Jefferson built this structure as a country retreat.
80^{†}	Potomac (Potowmack)(Patowmack) Canal Historic District	Potomac (Potowmack)(Patowmack) Canal Historic District	December 17, 1982 (#79003038)	Great Falls; 38°59′47″N 77°15′11″W	Fairfax	Remains of an impressively engineered canal built beside the falls of the Potomac.
81	Prestwould	Prestwould	July 31, 2003 (#03001033)	Clarksville; 36°39′19″N 78°34′14″W	Mecklenburg	Most intact and best documented plantation surviving in Southside Virginia.
82	Quarters 1 (Fort Myer)	Quarters 1 (Fort Myer)	November 28, 1972 (#72001382)	Arlington; 38°52′58″N 77°04′53″W	Arlington	Residence of all U.S. Army Chiefs of Staff since 1910
83	Peyton Randolph House	Peyton Randolph House	April 15, 1970 (#70000863)	Williamsburg; 37°16′13″N 76°42′00″W	Williamsburg (city)	Home of Peyton Randolph, first President of the Continental Congress.
84	Virginia Randolph Cottage	Virginia Randolph Cottage	December 2, 1974 (#74002126)	Glen Allen; 37°39′40″N 77°28′56″W	Henrico	Commemorates notable black teacher Virginia E. Randolph (1874-1958).
85	Rendezvous Docking Simulator	Rendezvous Docking Simulator	October 3, 1985 (#85002809)	Hampton; 37°05′02″N 76°22′41″W	Hampton (city)	Trainer used by Gemini and Apollo program astronauts to practice rendezvous and docking techniques at Langley Research Center
86	Reynolds Homestead	Reynolds Homestead	December 22, 1977 (#71000987)	Critz; 36°38′32″N 80°08′55″W	Patrick	Home of R. J. Reynolds, founder of the R. J. Reynolds Tobacco Company
87	Ripshin Farm	Ripshin Farm	November 11, 1971 (#71000979)	Trout Dale; 36°41′53″N 81°24′26″W	Grayson	Summer home of author Sherwood Anderson.
88	Rising Sun Tavern	Rising Sun Tavern	January 29, 1964 (#66000919)	Fredericksburg; 38°18′17″N 77°27′45″W	Fredericksburg (city)	Tavern built by Charles Washington, youngest brother of George Washington
89	Rotunda, University of Virginia	Rotunda, University of Virginia	December 21, 1965 (#66000937)	Charlottesville; 38°01′51″N 78°30′19″W	Albemarle County	Designed by Thomas Jefferson shortly before his death.
90	Sabine Hall	Sabine Hall	April 15, 1970 (#69000277)	Tappahannock; 37°56′24″N 76°47′05″W	Richmond	Early Georgian two story brick mansion.
91	St. John's Episcopal Church (Richmond)	St. John's Episcopal Church (Richmond)	January 20, 1961 (#66000920)	Richmond; 37°31′46″N 77°25′11″W	Richmond (city)	Patrick Henry delivered his "Liberty or Death" speech here.
92	Saint Luke's Church (Smithfield)	Saint Luke's Church (Smithfield)	October 9, 1960 (#66000838)	Smithfield; 36°56′17″N 76°35′11″W	Isle of Wight	English room church with Gothic details
93	St. Peter's Parish Church	St. Peter's Parish Church	March 2, 2012 (#69000263)	New Kent; 37°32′25″N 77°03′23″W	New Kent	1703 Episcopal church may have been where George and Martha Washington were married
94	Saratoga	Saratoga	November 7, 1973 (#70000788)	Boyce; 39°05′00″N 78°03′36″W	Clarke	Gray limestone Georgian house built by Brig. Gen. Daniel Morgan, best known for his victory over the British at the Battle of Cowpens in 1781.
95	Sayler's Creek Battlefield	Sayler's Creek Battlefield	February 4, 1985 (#85002436)	Farmville; 37°19′04″N 78°14′02″W	Amelia and Prince Edward	Sites of Battle of Sayler's Creek on April 6, 1865, where 1/4 of Lee's army was cut off, three days before surrender at Appomattox
96	Scotchtown (Patrick Henry House)	Scotchtown (Patrick Henry House)	December 21, 1965 (#66000835)	Ashland; 37°50′40″N 77°35′05″W	Hanover	Plantation house of unusual size that was childhood home of Dolley Madison and later a home of Patrick Henry
97	James Semple House	James Semple House	April 15, 1970 (#70000864)	Williamsburg; 37°16′06″N 76°41′36″W	Williamsburg (city)	House likely designed by Thomas Jefferson; a relative of the Semples, President John Tyler resided here while attending school.
98	Shack Mountain	Shack Mountain	October 5, 1992 (#76002090)	Charlottesville; 38°05′32″N 78°30′04″W	Albemarle	Home of Fiske Kimball, author of Thomas Jefferson, Architect.
99	Shirley	Shirley	April 15, 1970 (#69000328)	Hopewell; 37°21′21″N 77°14′39″W	Charles City	Oldest plantation in Virginia.
100^{†}	Skyline Drive Historic District	Skyline Drive Historic District	October 6, 2008 (#97000375)	Luray; 38°43′34″N 78°19′08″W	Albemarle	Road through the Shenandoah National Park
101	Spence's Point (John Roderigo Dos Passos House)	Spence's Point (John Roderigo Dos Passos House)	November 11, 1971 (#71000991)	Westmoreland; 38°04′46″N 76°33′26″W	Westmoreland	Farm home of writer John Roderigo Dos Passos.
102	Stabler-Leadbeater Apothecary Shop	Stabler-Leadbeater Apothecary Shop	January 13, 2021 (#100006254)	Alexandria; 105-107 S. Fairfax; 38°48′15″N 77°02′34″W	Alexandria (city)	
103	Stratford Hall	Stratford Hall	October 7, 1960 (#66000851)	Lerty; 38°08′59″N 76°50′23″W	Westmoreland	Notable example of early Georgian architecture. Birthplace of Robert E Lee.
104	Thoroughgood House	Thoroughgood House	October 9, 1960 (#66000921)	Virginia Beach; 36°53′36″N 76°06′47″W	Virginia Beach (city)	One of the oldest brick houses in Virginia, built by Adam Thoroughgood's descendant.
105^{†}	Thunderbird Archeological District	Thunderbird Archeological District	May 5, 1977 (#77001495)	Limeton	Warren	Three archeological sites.
106^{†}	Tredegar Iron Works	Tredegar Iron Works	December 22, 1977 (#71001048)	Richmond; 37°32′08″N 77°26′43″W	Richmond (city)	One of the largest iron works from 1841 to 1865.
107^{†}	Tuckahoe	Tuckahoe	August 11, 1969 (#00000259)	Manakin; 37°34′14″N 77°39′11″W	Goochland and Henrico	Tuckahoe, owned by the Randolph family, was the home of president Thomas Jefferson for 7 years during his boyhood.
108	John Tyler House	John Tyler House	July 4, 1961 (#66000922)	Charles City; 37°19′29″N 77°01′14″W	Charles City	Residence of President John Tyler.
109	University Of Virginia Historic District	University Of Virginia Historic District	November 11, 1971 (#70000865)	Charlottesville; 38°02′05″N 78°30′15″W	Albemarle County	District includes Jefferson's original "academical village" and the Rotunda.
110	Variable Density Tunnel	Variable Density Tunnel	October 3, 1985 (#85002795)	Hampton; 37°04′37″N 76°20′39″W	Hampton (city)	Steel tank from a wind tunnel at Langley Research Center. (use source )
111	Virginia Governor's Mansion	Virginia Governor's Mansion	June 7, 1988 (#69000360)	Richmond; 37°32′12″N 77°25′57″W	Richmond (city)	State Executive Mansion.
112^{†}	Virginia Military Institute Historic District	Virginia Military Institute Historic District	May 30, 1974 (#74002219)	Lexington; 37°47′25″N 79°26′09″W	Lexington (city)	First state-supported military college.
113^{#}	Maggie Lena Walker House	Maggie Lena Walker House	May 15, 1975 (#75002100)	Richmond; 37°32′52″N 77°26′16″W	Richmond (city)	Home of Maggie Lena Walker, first woman to establish an American bank; now a National Historic Site
114^{†}	Washington and Lee University Historic District	Washington and Lee University Historic District	November 11, 1971 (#71001047)	Lexington; 37°47′08″N 79°26′32″W	Lexington (city)	Neoclassical buildings that form one of the most dignified college campuses. Washington & Lee University
115	George Washington Boyhood Home Site	George Washington Boyhood Home Site	February 16, 2000 (#72001417)	Fredericksburg; 38°17′43″N 77°26′57″W	Stafford	Known locally as Ferry Farm.
116	George Washington Masonic National Memorial	George Washington Masonic National Memorial	July 21, 2015 (#15000622)	Alexandria; 38°48′27″N 77°03′58″W	Alexandria (city)	One of the largest private memorials to Washington, reflecting the Masonic involvement of many Founding Fathers
117^{†}	Waterford Historic District	Waterford Historic District	April 15, 1970 (#69000256)	Waterford; 39°11′12″N 77°36′36″W	Loudoun	Picturesque village, oldest settlement in Loudoun County
118	Westover	Westover	October 9, 1960 (#66000923)	Charles City; 37°19′58″N 77°10′23″W	Charles City	Plantation that is ancestral seat of the Byrd family
119	White House of the Confederacy	White House of the Confederacy	December 19, 1960 (#66000924)	Richmond; 37°32′20″N 77°25′47″W	Richmond (city)	Residence of Confederate President Jefferson Davis.
120	Wickham-Valentine House	Wickham-Valentine House	November 11, 1971 (#69000329)	Richmond; 37°32′30″N 77°25′52″W	Richmond (city)	One of Richmond's finest Federal residences.
121^{†}	Williamsburg Historic District	Williamsburg Historic District	October 9, 1960 (#66000925)	Williamsburg; 37°15′45″N 76°41′59″W	Williamsburg (city)	Capital of Virginia from 1699 to 1799.
122	Woodlawn	Woodlawn	August 6, 1998 (#70000792)	Alexandria; 38°43′00″N 77°08′10″W	Fairfax	Flagship property of the National Trust for Historic Preservation.
123	Woodrow Wilson Birthplace	Woodrow Wilson Birthplace	July 19, 1964 (#66000926)	Staunton; 38°08′55″N 79°04′09″W	Staunton (city)	Birthplace of President Thomas Woodrow Wilson, now his presidential library
124	Wren Building, College of William and Mary	Wren Building, College of William and Mary	October 9, 1960 (#66000929)	Williamsburg; 37°16′08″N 76°42′33″W	Williamsburg (city)	Wren Building at the College of William and Mary.
125	Wythe House	Wythe House	April 15, 1970 (#70000866)	Williamsburg; 37°16′12″N 76°42′12″W	Williamsburg (city)	One of Virginia's finest Georgian brick townhouse and home of George Wythe.
126	Yeocomico Church	Yeocomico Church	April 15, 1970 (#69000331)	Tucker Hill; 38°03′44″N 76°35′50″W	Westmoreland	Significant example of transitional Colonial architecture.

== Former National Historic Landmarks ==
	Landmark name	Image	Date designated	Date moved	Locality	County	Description
1	Eight-Foot High Speed Tunnel	1985 HABS photograph	October 3, 1985	August 25, 2014	Hampton	Hampton (city)	Demolished
2	Full Scale 30- by 60-Foot Tunnel	HAER photograph	October 3, 1985	August 25, 2014	Hampton	Hampton (city)	Demolished

== See also ==
- National Register of Historic Places listings in Virginia
- United States National Park Service areas in Virginia
- List of National Historic Landmarks by state
- List of National Natural Landmarks in Virginia
