= Exchange Building (Petersburg, Virginia) =

Historic commercial building in Virginia, United States

- Exchange
- U.S. National Register of Historic Places
- U.S. National Historic Landmark
- U.S. Historic district – Contributing property
- Virginia Landmarks Register
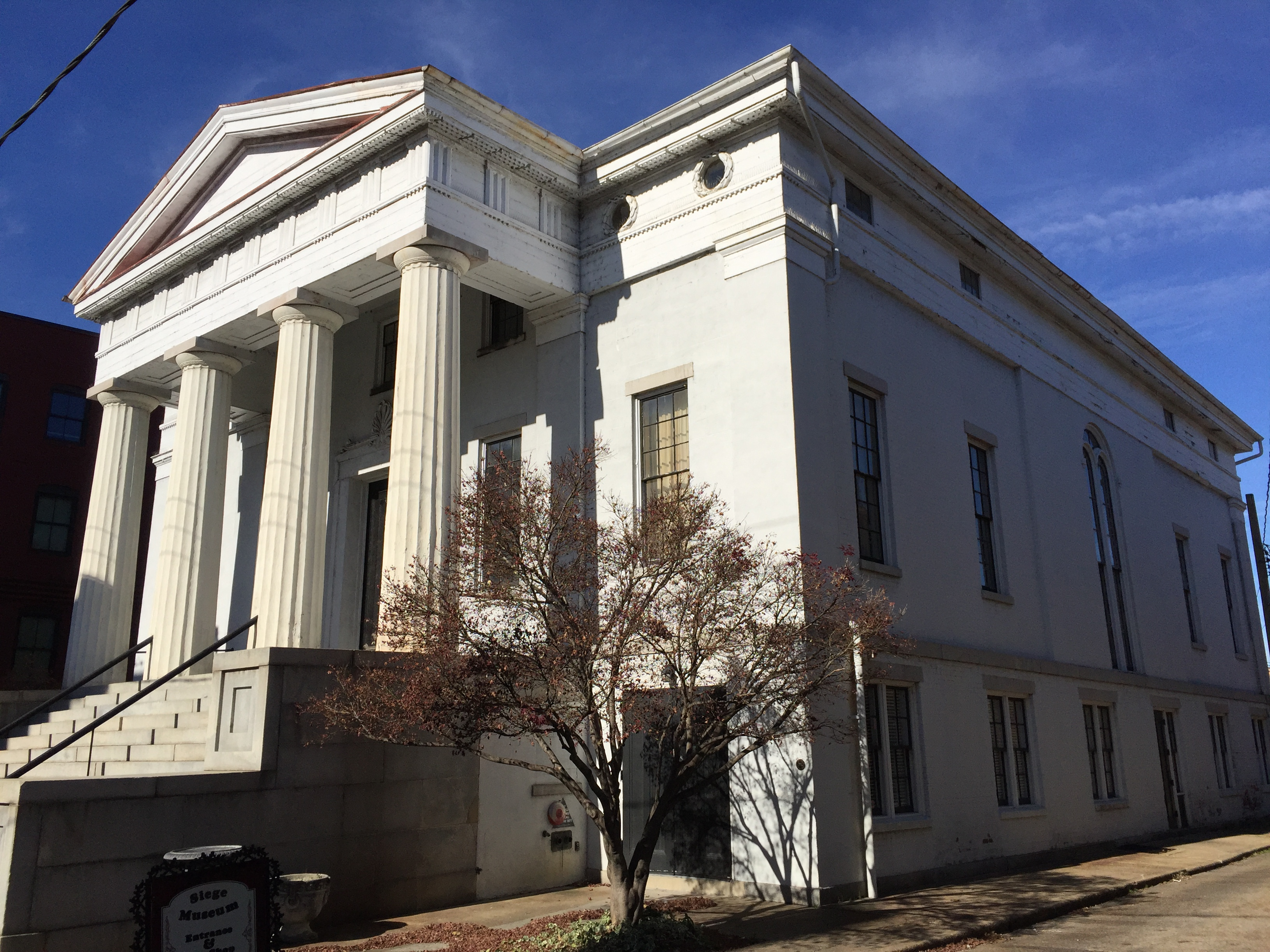
- Exchange Building, 2017

- Location within Virginia Location within the United States
- Location: 15–19 W. Bank St., Petersburg, Virginia
- Coordinates: 37°13′55″N 77°24′16″W
- Built: 1841
- Architectural style: Greek Revival
- Part of: Petersburg Old Town Historic District (ID80004314)
- NRHP reference No.: 69000322
- VLR No.: 123-0051

Significant dates
- Added to NRHP: June 11, 1969
- Designated NHL: November 11, 1971
- Designated CP: July 04, 1980
- Designated VLR: November 5, 1968

The Exchange Building, also known as the Merchant's Exchange Building or The Exchange, is a historic commercial building in at 15-19 West Bank Street in Petersburg, Virginia. Built in 1841, this Greek Revival style building is one of the least-altered examples of a 19th-century market hall. It now houses the Siege Museum commemorating the Siege of Petersburg. It was declared a National Historic Landmark in 1971.

== Description and history ==
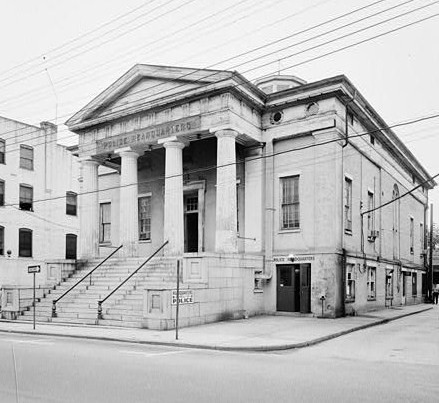
HABS photo of the Exchange Building

The Exchange Building is located in Petersburg's Old Town, at the northeast corner of West Bank Street and Exchange Avenue. It is a two-story, five bay by five bay, building with a hipped roof. It features a four-column Doric order portico in front, and five pilastered bays on the sides. At the building's center is a large circular domed room, the dome supported by piers and an entablature.

The Exchange was created in 1839 by a group of Petersburg businessmen as a meeting place where locally produced wares, predominantly tobacco and cotton, could be sold, and as a place to hold public auctions. The building was designed by an architect named Berrien from New York City, and was completed in 1841. It is a locally rare example of high-style Greek Revival architecture, and is one of the nation's least-altered examples of a market building. It now houses the Siege Museum, which displays artifacts and history relating to the American Civil War Siege of Petersburg. The Siege Museum was closed about 2016. The Exchange Building now houses the Petersburg Visitor Center on the first floor. In September 2021 a new museum, telling the 400 year history of Petersburg, will open. It will have various exhibits telling the story of Petersburg.

== See also ==
- List of National Historic Landmarks in Virginia
- National Register of Historic Places listings in Petersburg, Virginia
