= First Baptist Church (Williamsburg, Virginia) =

Historic church in Virginia, United States

- U.S. National Register of Historic Places
- Virginia Landmarks Register
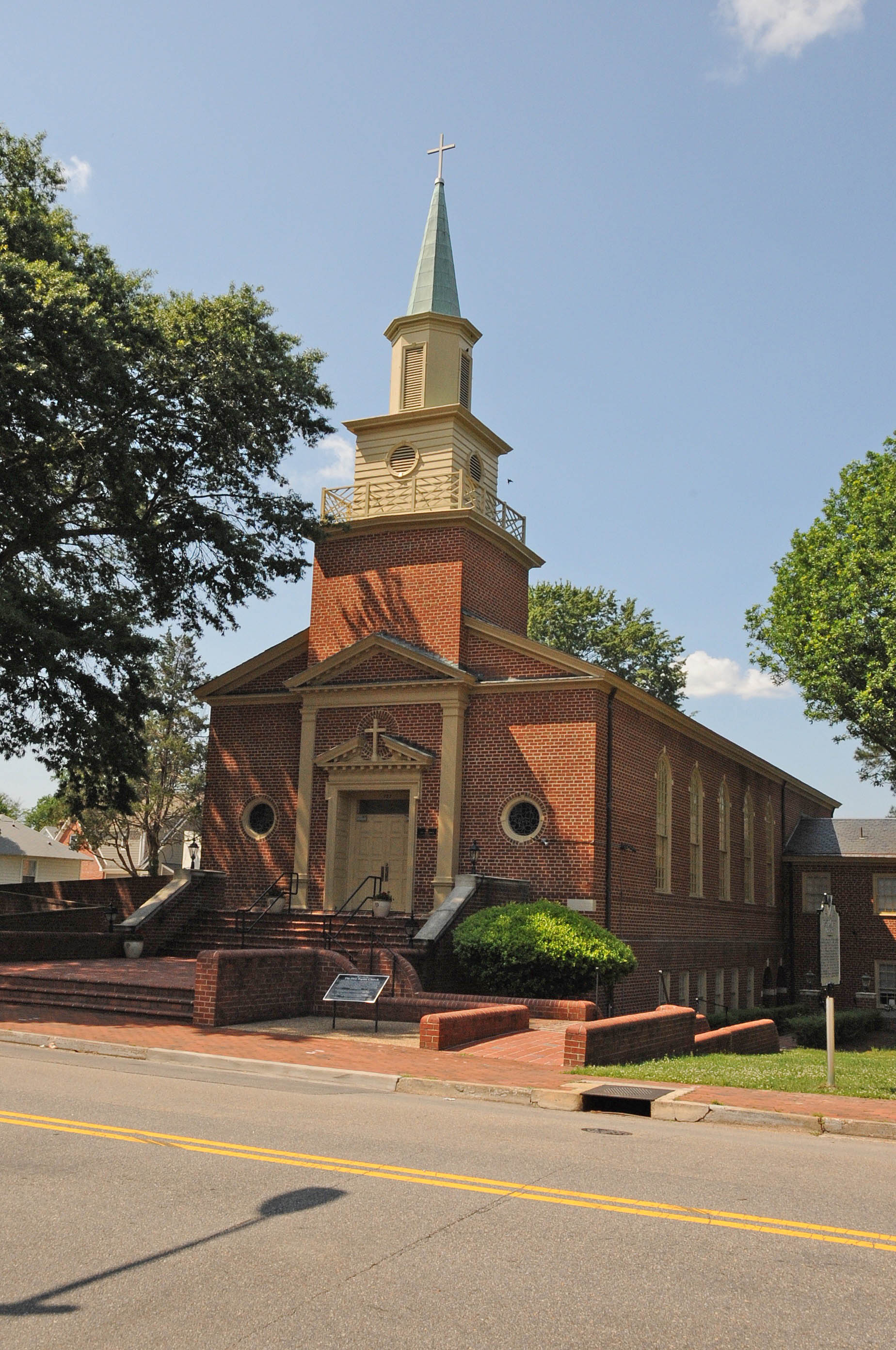
- First Baptist Church in 2018

- Location within Virginia Location within the United States
- Location: 727 Scotland St.
- Coordinates: 37°16′27″N 76°42′40″W
- Area: less than one acre
- Built: 1956
- Architect: Bernard Spigel
- Architectural style: Colonial Revival
- Website: firstbaptistchurch1776.org
- NRHP reference No.: 100001050
- VLR No.: 137-5071

Significant dates
- Added to NRHP: June 5, 2017
- Designated VLR: March 16, 2017

The First Baptist Church is a historic church at 727 Scotland Road in Williamsburg, Virginia. It is a brick Colonial Revival structure, built in 1956 to a design by Norfolk architect Bernard Spigel. It is of only two known church designs by Spigel.

== History ==
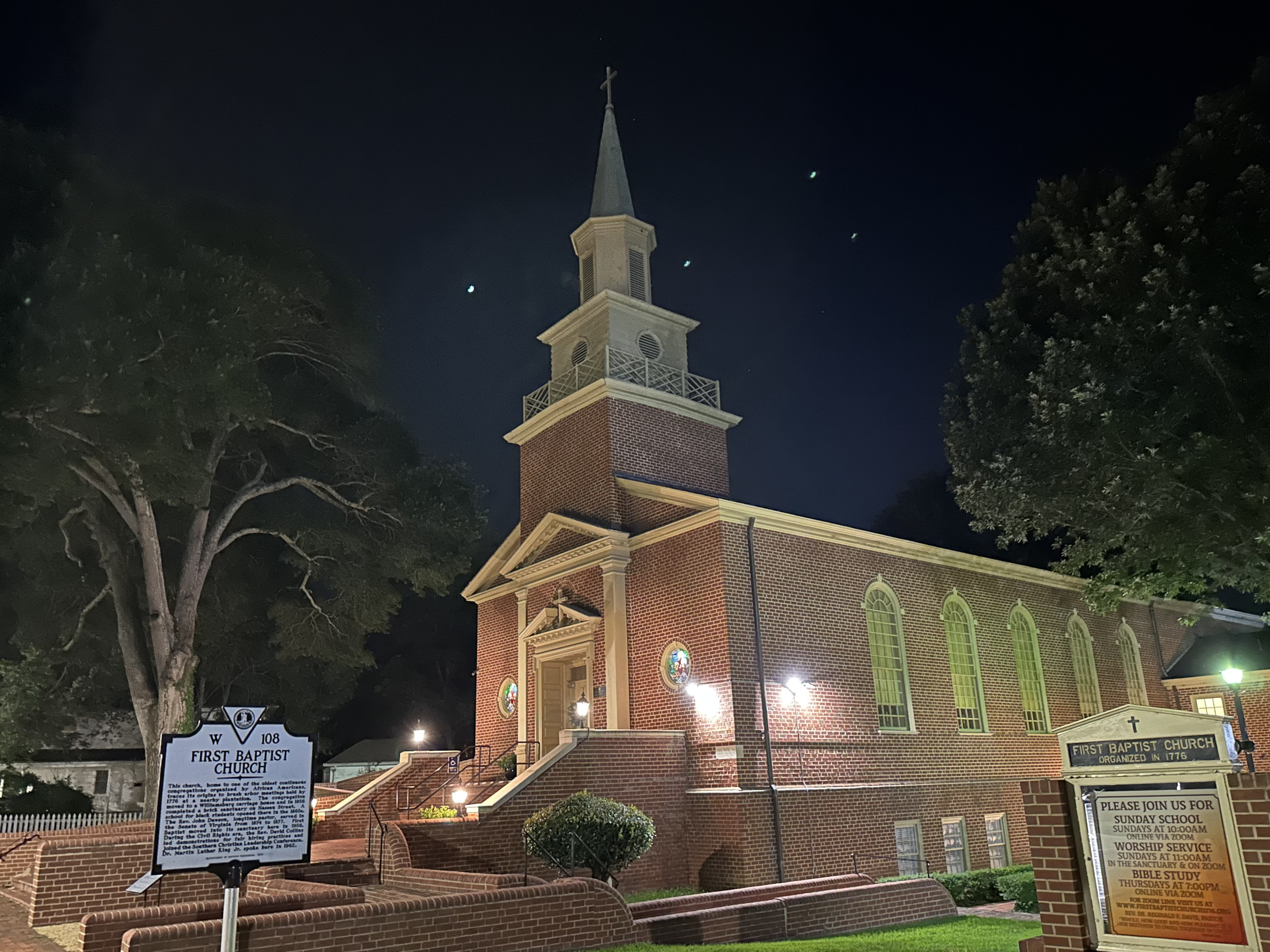
The church in July 2024 with Virginia historic marker

The congregation was founded in the 1770s as a non-denominational group of free and enslaved African-Americans, and became officially Baptist in 1781, led by Gowan Pamphlet, an ordained slave. At the time of its founding, African-Americans could not own property; a structure was instead provided for them on the land of a white tradesman, Jesse Cole, with the understanding that it would be used as a place of worship. This building was destroyed by a tornado in 1834, and replaced by a larger structure erected in 1856. John M. Dawson was the pastor for over forty-five years and was also a Virginia state senator between 1874 and 1877 during the Reconstruction Era.

In 1953, the congregation was raising funds for an expansion when the Colonial Williamsburg Foundation approached with an offer to buy the property for a price adequate to fund the construction of an entirely new church on a plot of land on Scotland Street, about 6 blocks to the west. Upon the new church's completion, the old would be demolished, furthering the Foundation's goal of restoring the historic area of Williamsburg to its late colonial appearance.

The Scotland Street building was completed in 1956. Martin Luther King delivered a speech at First Baptist in 1962. A church bell had been commissioned in 1886 for the approximate centennial of the congregation, dubbed the "freedom bell". This bell was restored in 2016 and rung by President Barack Obama at the dedication of the National Museum of African American History and Culture.

The building was listed on the Virginia Landmarks Register and the National Register of Historic Places in 2017.

== See also ==
- National Register of Historic Places in Williamsburg, Virginia
