= National Register of Historic Places listings in Petersburg, Virginia =

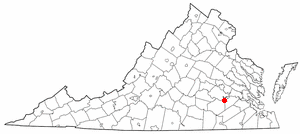
Location of Petersburg in Virginia

This is a list of the National Register of Historic Places listings in Petersburg, Virginia.

This is intended to be a complete list of the properties and districts on the National Register of Historic Places in the independent city of Petersburg, Virginia, United States. The locations of National Register properties and districts for which the latitude and longitude coordinates are included below, may be seen in an online map.

There are 46 properties and districts listed on the National Register in the city, including 1 National Historic Landmark.

This National Park Service list is complete through NPS recent listings posted August 21, 2026.

== Current listings ==
	Name on the Register	Image	Date listed	Location	Description
1	Appomattox Iron Works	Appomattox Iron Works	August 11, 1976 (#76002226)	20-28 Old St. 37°13′58″N 77°24′22″W	
2	Atlantic Coast Line Railroad Commercial and Industrial Historic District	Atlantic Coast Line Railroad Commercial and Industrial Historic District	August 27, 2009 (#09000665)	200-300 W. Washington, 4-42 S. Market, 100-100 Perry, the 200-300 blocks of W. Wythe, and the 200 block of Brown Sts. 37°13′28″N 77°24′29″W	
3	Battersea	Battersea	November 12, 1969 (#69000344)	1289 Upper Appomattox St. 37°13′32″N 77°25′42″W	
4	Blandford Cemetery	Blandford Cemetery	October 15, 1992 (#92001371)	319 S. Crater Rd. 37°13′33″N 77°22′50″W	Burial ground for 30,000 Confederates killed in the siege of Petersburg (1864-1865); one of several sites claiming to have celebrated the first Memorial Day ceremony, in 1866, in the United States
5	Blandford Church	Blandford Church	May 31, 1972 (#72001513)	319 S. Crater Rd. 37°13′34″N 77°23′15″W	
6	Anna P. Bolling Junior High School	Anna P. Bolling Junior High School	October 30, 1998 (#98001316)	35 W. Fillmore St. 37°13′19″N 77°24′09″W	
7	Byrne Street USO Club		May 27, 2022 (#100007780)	464 Byrne St. 37°13′12″N 77°24′15″W	
8	Centre Hill	Centre Hill	December 27, 1972 (#72001514)	Center Hill Lane; 37°13′50″N 77°24′05″W	
9	Centre Hill Historic District	Centre Hill Historic District	June 13, 1986 (#86001277)	Henry, N. Adams, N. Jefferson, Franklin, and E. Washington Sts., Centre Hill Ct., and Centre Hill Ave. 37°13′46″N 77°24′00″W	
10	Christ and Grace Episcopal Church	Christ and Grace Episcopal Church	February 27, 2020 (#100005011)	1545 South Sycamore St. 37°12′42″N 77°23′48″W	
11	City Market	City Market	June 11, 1969 (#69000345)	Rock, W. Old and River Sts., and Cockade Alley; 37°14′00″N 77°24′15″W	
12	Cohen House	Cohen House	November 1, 2007 (#07001141)	32 S. Adams St. 37°13′37″N 77°24′06″W	
13	Commerce Street Industrial Historic District	Commerce Street Industrial Historic District	September 12, 2008 (#08000870)	Commerce, Upper Appomattox, West, Dunlop, and South Sts. 37°13′32″N 77°25′12″W	
14	Exchange Building	Exchange Building	June 11, 1969 (#69000322)	15-19 W. Bank St. 37°13′55″N 77°24′20″W	
15	Farmers' Bank	Farmers' Bank	April 13, 1972 (#72001515)	Northwestern corner of Bollingbrook St. and Cockade Alley; 37°13′58″N 77°24′15″W	
16	Folly Castle Historic District	Folly Castle Historic District	July 16, 1980 (#80004313)	Perry and W. Washington Sts.; also 235-618 Washington, 235-580 Hinton, 15-37 Guarantee, 18-115 Lafayette, and 18-42 Perry Sts.; also roughly along South St. from Commerce St. to Farmer St. 37°13′37″N 77°24′34″W	Second and third sets of boundaries represent boundary increases of April 14, 1992 and January 10, 2000
17	Nathaniel Friend House	Nathaniel Friend House	August 11, 1976 (#76002227)	27-29 Bollingbrook St. 37°13′58″N 77°24′14″W	
18	Halifax Triangle and Downtown Commercial Historic District	Halifax Triangle and Downtown Commercial Historic District	February 12, 2019 (#100002886)	Generally bounded by Washington, Adams, Sycamore, Halifax, Byrne, and Harrison Sts. 37°13′36″N 77°24′11″W	
19	Jarratt House	Jarratt House	September 5, 2023 (#100008693)	808-810 Logan St. 37°14′15″N 77°23′56″W	
20	Lee Memorial Park	Lee Memorial Park	August 14, 2000 (#00000896)	1832 Johnson Rd. 37°11′57″N 77°24′24″W	
21	McIlwaine House	McIlwaine House	July 16, 1973 (#73002217)	Market Square at corner of Pelham and Cockade Alleys; 37°14′00″N 77°24′14″W	
22	William McKenney House	William McKenney House	December 6, 1990 (#90001830)	250 S. Sycamore St. 37°13′24″N 77°24′07″W	
23	William R. McKenney Library		January 17, 2025 (#100010351)	137 South Sycamore Street; 37°13′31″N 77°24′08″W	
24	North Battersea-Pride's Field Historic District	North Battersea-Pride's Field Historic District	May 26, 2005 (#05000475)	Roughly along the Appomattox River bank, McKenzie, W. High., Upper Appomattox Sts., from 1250 W. High to Fleet Sts. 37°13′36″N 77°25′21″W	
25	Peabody Building of the Peabody-Williams School	Peabody Building of the Peabody-Williams School	August 2, 2000 (#00000891)	Jones St. 37°13′04″N 77°24′41″W	
26	People's Memorial Cemetery	People's Memorial Cemetery	March 28, 2008 (#08000245)	334 S. Crater Rd. 37°13′30″N 77°23′20″W	
27	Petersburg City Hall	Petersburg City Hall	November 16, 1978 (#78003185)	129-141 N. Union St. 37°13′47″N 77°24′19″W	
28	Petersburg Courthouse	Petersburg Courthouse	May 14, 1973 (#73002218)	Court House Sq. 37°13′51″N 77°24′13″W	
29	Petersburg Courthouse Historic District	Petersburg Courthouse Historic District	December 21, 1990 (#90001572)	Roughly bounded by W. Bank, N. Adams, W. Washington, and N. Market Sts. 37°13′49″N 77°24′18″W	
30	Petersburg Gas Company		March 9, 2026 (#100012793)	416-436 Bank Street; 37°13′56″N 77°23′49″W	
31	Petersburg Old Town Historic District	Petersburg Old Town Historic District	July 4, 1980 (#80004314)	U.S. Route 1 and State Route 36; also 241 4th St., 223-225 Henry St., and 230 and 316 E. Bank St. 37°13′55″N 77°24′37″W	Second set of boundaries represents a boundary increase of September 12, 2008
32	Petersburg Trailways Bus Station	Petersburg Trailways Bus Station	September 29, 2015 (#15000680)	108 E. Washington St. 37°13′41″N 77°24′05″W	
33	Pocahontas Island Historic District	Pocahontas Island Historic District	November 3, 2006 (#06000977)	Pocahontas, Witten, Rolfe, Logan, and Sapony Sts. 37°14′12″N 77°23′57″W	
34	Poplar Lawn Historic District	Poplar Lawn Historic District	May 23, 1980 (#80004315)	Roughly bounded by Surrey Lane and St. Jefferson, Mars, and Harrison Sts.; also the junction of E. Wythe and S. Jefferson, from the southeastern section of the original historic district to Lieutenant Run, and along both sides of Harrison St. at its southwestern corner 37°13′27″N 77°24′05″W	Second set of boundaries represents a boundary increase of February 10, 2006
35	Saint Paul's Church	Saint Paul's Church	May 30, 1986 (#86001191)	102 N. Union St. 37°13′44″N 77°24′20″W	
36	Second Presbyterian Church	Second Presbyterian Church	January 14, 1991 (#90002114)	419 W. Washington St. 37°13′37″N 77°24′37″W	
37	South Chappell Street Car Barn	South Chappell Street Car Barn	February 25, 2009 (#09000066)	124 South Chappell St. 37°13′12″N 77°25′28″W	
38	South Market Street Historic District	South Market Street Historic District	April 22, 1992 (#92000345)	S. Market St. from Washington St. to Halifax St. 37°13′30″N 77°24′21″W	
39	Stewart-Hinton House	Stewart-Hinton House	January 14, 2004 (#03001437)	416 High St. 37°13′46″N 77°24′41″W	
40	Strawberry Hill	Strawberry Hill	December 23, 1974 (#74002239)	231-235-237 Hinton St. 37°13′43″N 77°24′31″W	
41	Sutherland House	Sutherland House	November 22, 2011 (#11000837)	606 Harding St. 37°13′04″N 77°24′19″W	
42	Tabb Street Presbyterian Church	Tabb Street Presbyterian Church	May 31, 1979 (#79003288)	21 W. Tabb St. 37°13′49″N 77°24′19″W	
43	Virginia Trunk & Bag Company	Virginia Trunk & Bag Company	December 23, 2009 (#09001157)	600 W. Wythe St. 37°13′28″N 77°24′38″W	
44	Thomas Wallace House	Thomas Wallace House	May 2, 1975 (#75002116)	Southwestern corner of Brown and S. Market Sts. 37°13′27″N 77°24′22″W	
45	Walnut Hill Historic District	Walnut Hill Historic District	September 22, 2023 (#100008702)	Roughly bounded by Johnson Rd., North, East, and South Blvds., Mount Vernon, Fleur de Hundred, and East Tuckahoe Sts. 37°12′08″N 77°23′46″W	
46	Washington Street Methodist Church	Washington Street Methodist Church	November 24, 1980 (#80004209)	14-24 E. Washington St. 37°13′40″N 77°24′09″W	

== See also ==
- List of National Historic Landmarks in Virginia
- National Register of Historic Places listings in Virginia
- National Register of Historic Places listings in Chesterfield County, Virginia
- National Register of Historic Places listings in Dinwiddie County, Virginia
