= Cohen House =

Cohen House may refer to:

in England

- Cohen House, London, in Chelsea

in the United States

- Alfred H. Cohen House, Oakland, California, listed on the National Register of Historic Places (NRHP) in Alameda County, California
- Joseph Elliston House, Brentwood, Tennessee, also known as Cohen House, NRHP-listed
- Cohen House (Petersburg, Virginia), listed on the NRHP in Petersburg, Virginia
- Cohen House (Taormina), in the Isola Bella Nature Reserve, Taormina, Sicily, Italy
