= Trailways Transportation System =

Network of American bus service operators

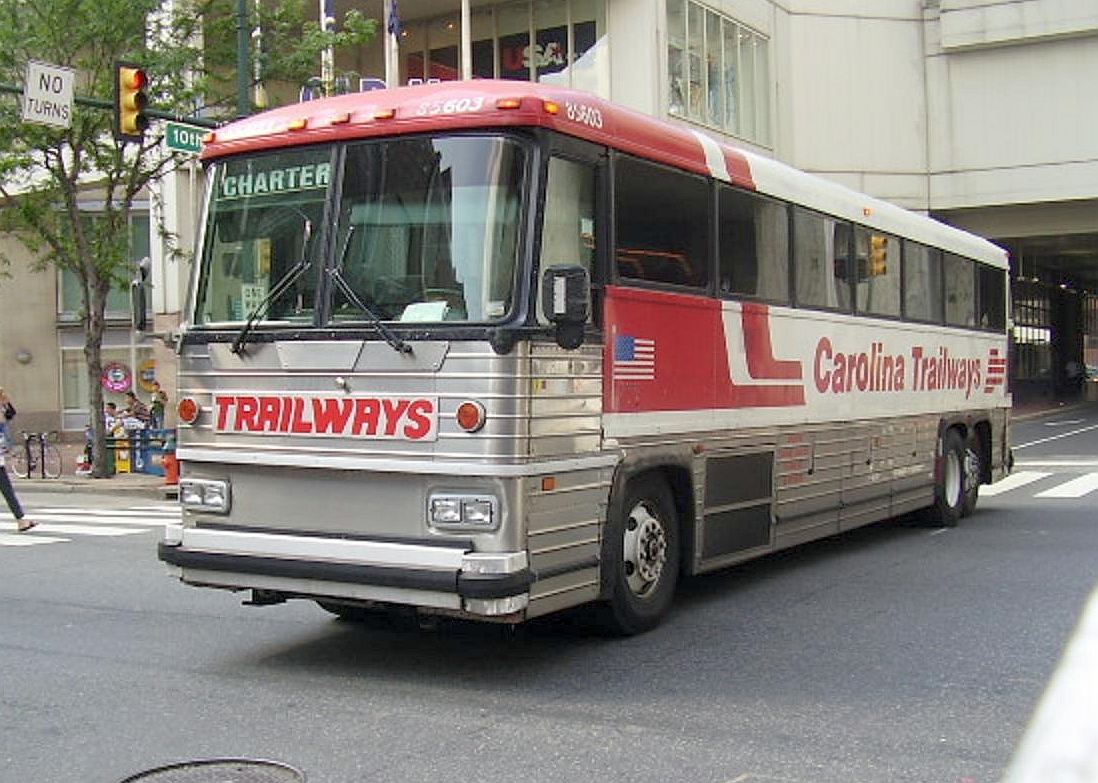
- Carolina Trailways bus in Philadelphia in 2009
- Founded: 1936
- Headquarters: Fairfax, Virginia, U.S.
- Service area: United States; Canada; Germany; Netherlands
- Service type: Intercity coach service, Charter bus service
- Operator: Cooperative
- Website: trailways.com

The Trailways Transportation System is a public transport bus service in the United States. It operates a network of approximately 70 independent bus companies. The company is headquartered in Fairfax, Virginia.

== History ==
The predecessor to Trailways Transportation System was founded February 5, 1936, by Burlington Transportation Company, Santa Fe Trails Transportation Company, Missouri Pacific Stages, Safeway Lines, Inc., and Frank Martz Coach Company.

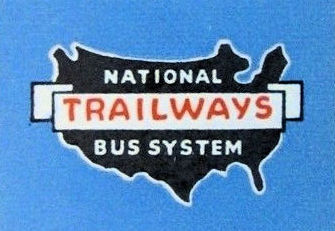
1949 matchbook cover art

The system originated with coast-to-coast service as the National Trailways Bus System (NTBS). Greyhound Lines had grown so quickly in the 1920s and 1930s that the Interstate Commerce Commission encouraged smaller independent operators to form the NTBS to provide competition. Unlike Greyhound, which centralized ownership, Trailways member companies became a formidable competitor while staying an association of almost 100 separate companies. In the 1950s, Morgan W. Walker, Sr., of Alexandria, Louisiana, became head of the southern division of the company. He had entered the business on a small scale during World War II as the Interurban Transportation Company of Alexandria. During the 1950s and 1960s, consolidation among bus operators resulted in four of the five original Trailways members becoming part of a new company, Continental Trailways, which eventually operated the majority of Trailways routes.

In 1968, under the leadership of major stockholder Kemmons Wilson, Holiday Inn acquired Continental Trailways, which remained a subsidiary of Holiday Inn until 1979, when Holiday Inn sold Trailways to private investor Henry Lea Hillman Sr., of Pittsburgh, Pennsylvania. In the years during which Trailways was a subsidiary of Holiday Inn, television commercials for Holiday Inn frequently showed a Trailways bus stopping at a Holiday Inn hotel.

Regular route bus ridership in the United States had been declining steadily since World War II despite minor gains during the 1973 and 1979 energy crises. By 1986, the Greyhound Bus Line had been spun off from the parent company to new owners, which resulted in Greyhound Lines becoming solely a bus transportation company. It was sold off to new owners headed by Fred Currey, a former executive with the largest member of the National Trailways Bus System. The old Greyhound parent had changed its name to Dial Corporation.

Under the new ownership in 1987, led by Currey, Greyhound Lines later acquired the former Continental Trailways company, the largest member of the Trailways system, effectively eliminating a large portion of bus competition. Although Greyhound negotiated cooperative schedules with Carolina Coach Company and Southeastern Trailways, two of the larger members of the Trailways system, many smaller carriers were effectively forced out of business. Greyhound later acquired Carolina and the intercity operations of Southeastern. Most of the survivors diversified into charters and tours.

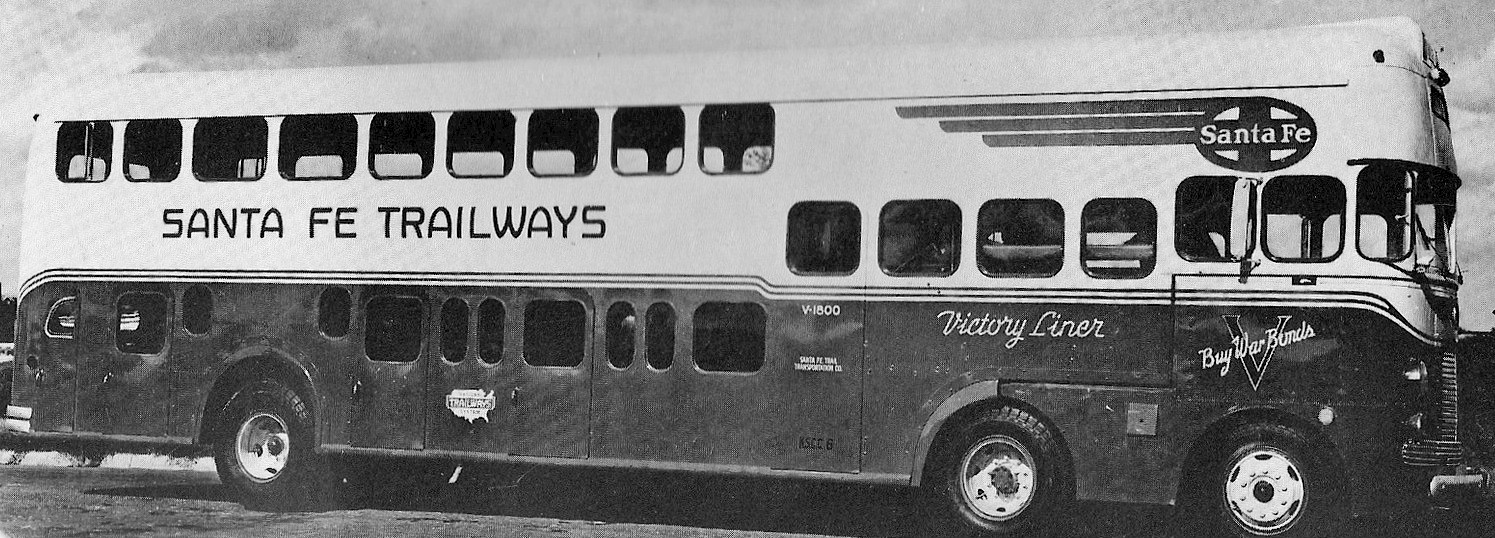
A Santa Fe bus used to transport workers to defense plants during World War II

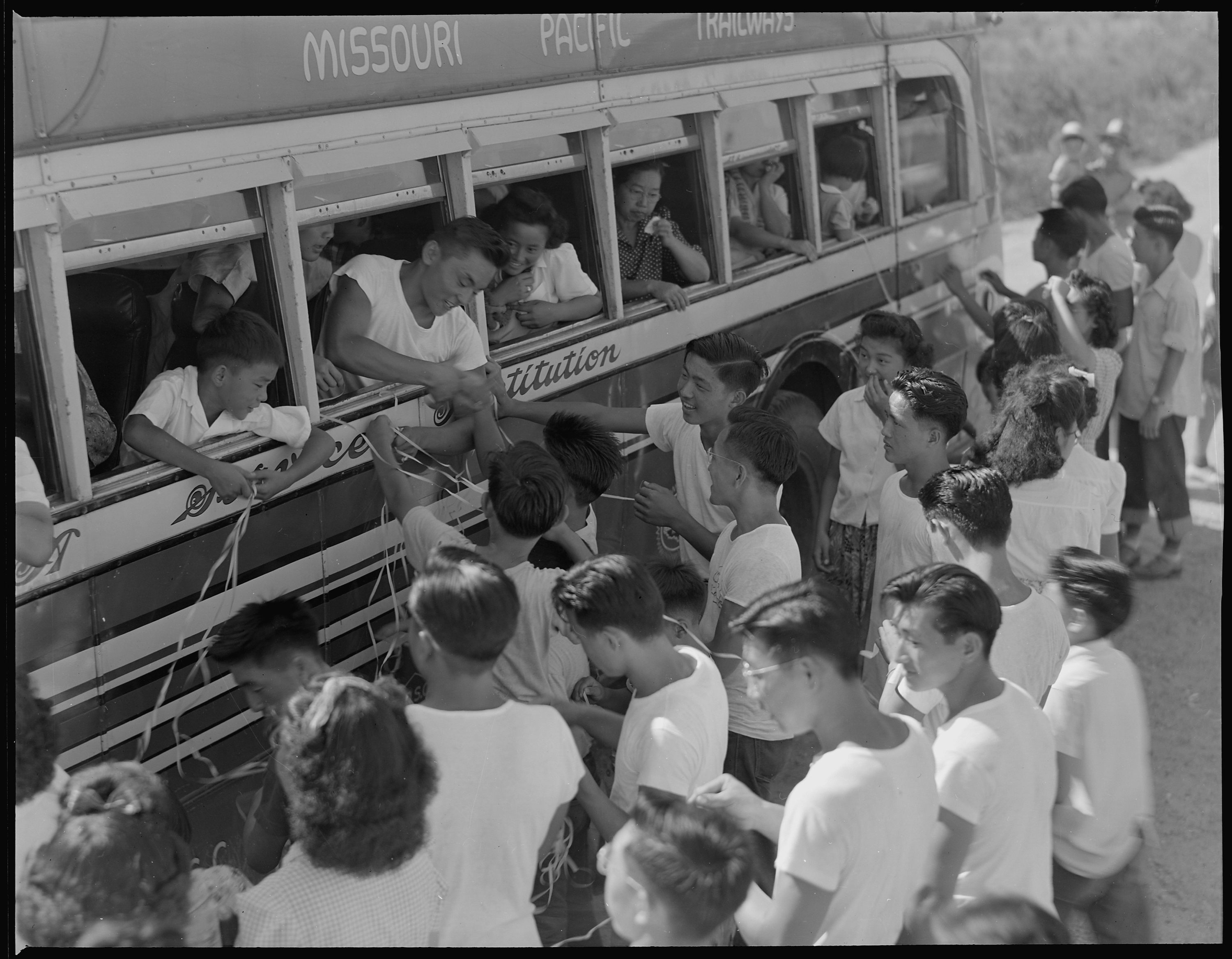
Japanese-American youths are transported to the Rohwer War Relocation Center aboard a Missouri Pacific Trailways bus, 1944

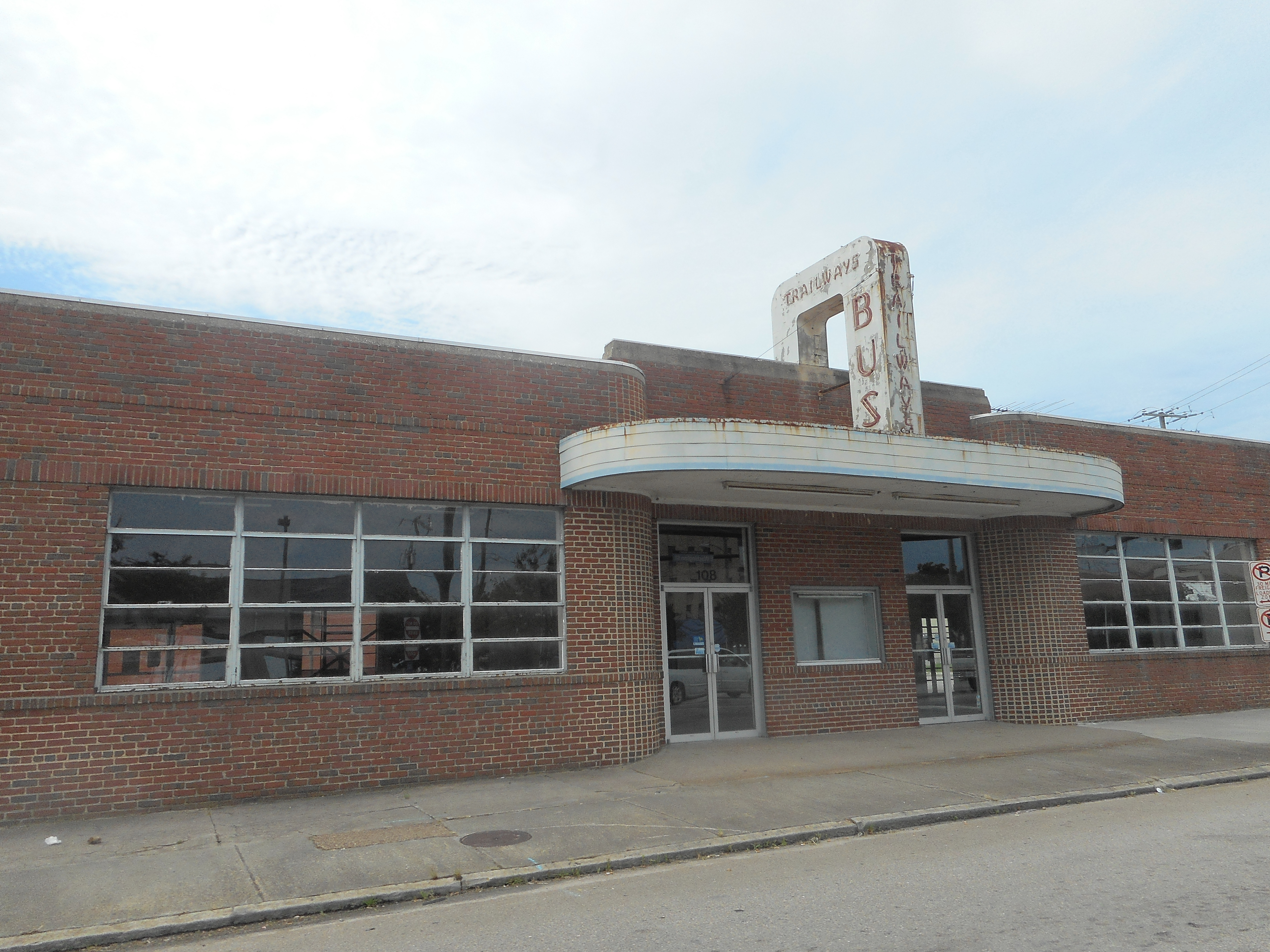
The Petersburg Trailways Bus Station in Petersburg, Virginia is listed on the National Register of Historic Places

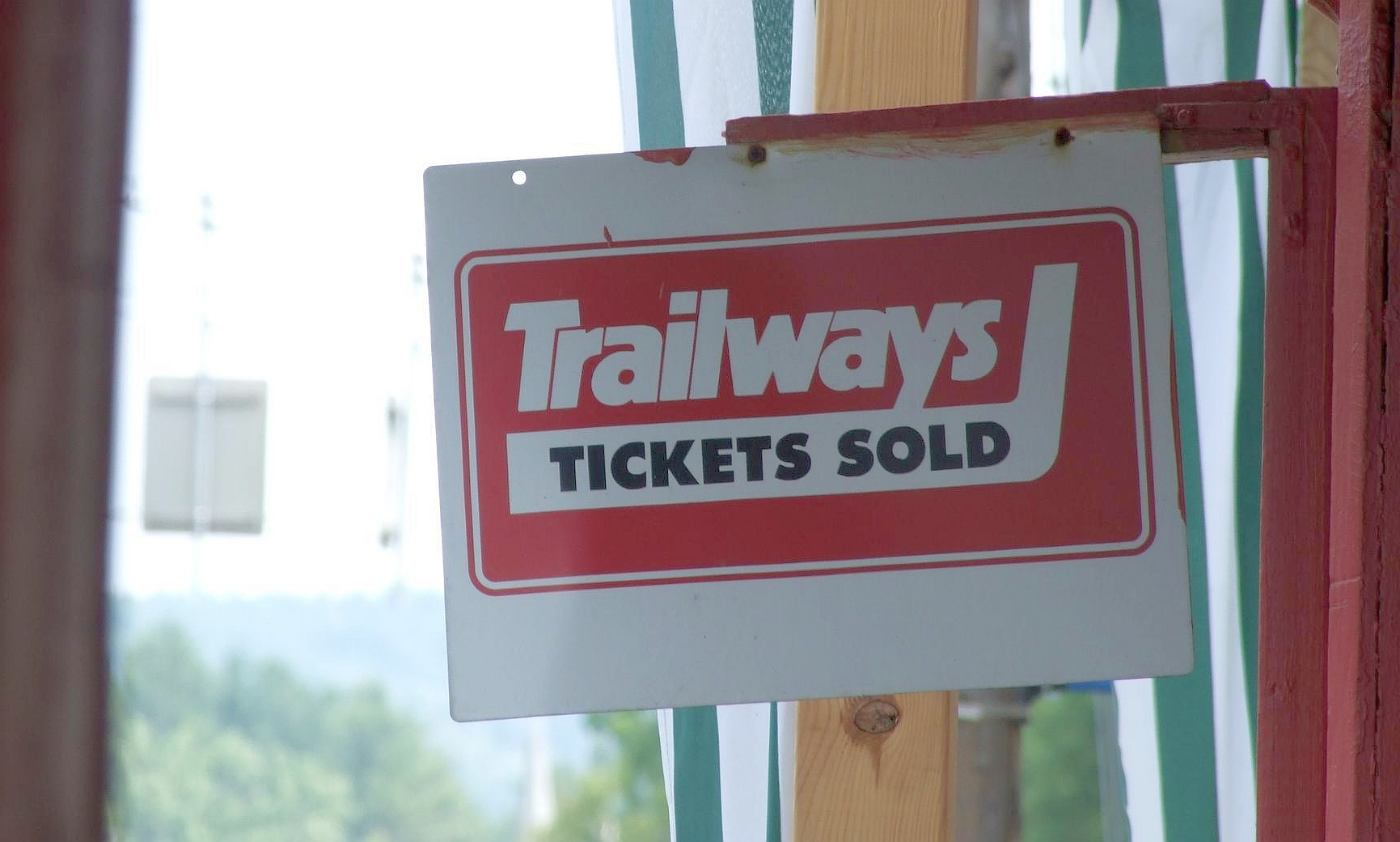
Trailways sign in Warrensburg, New York

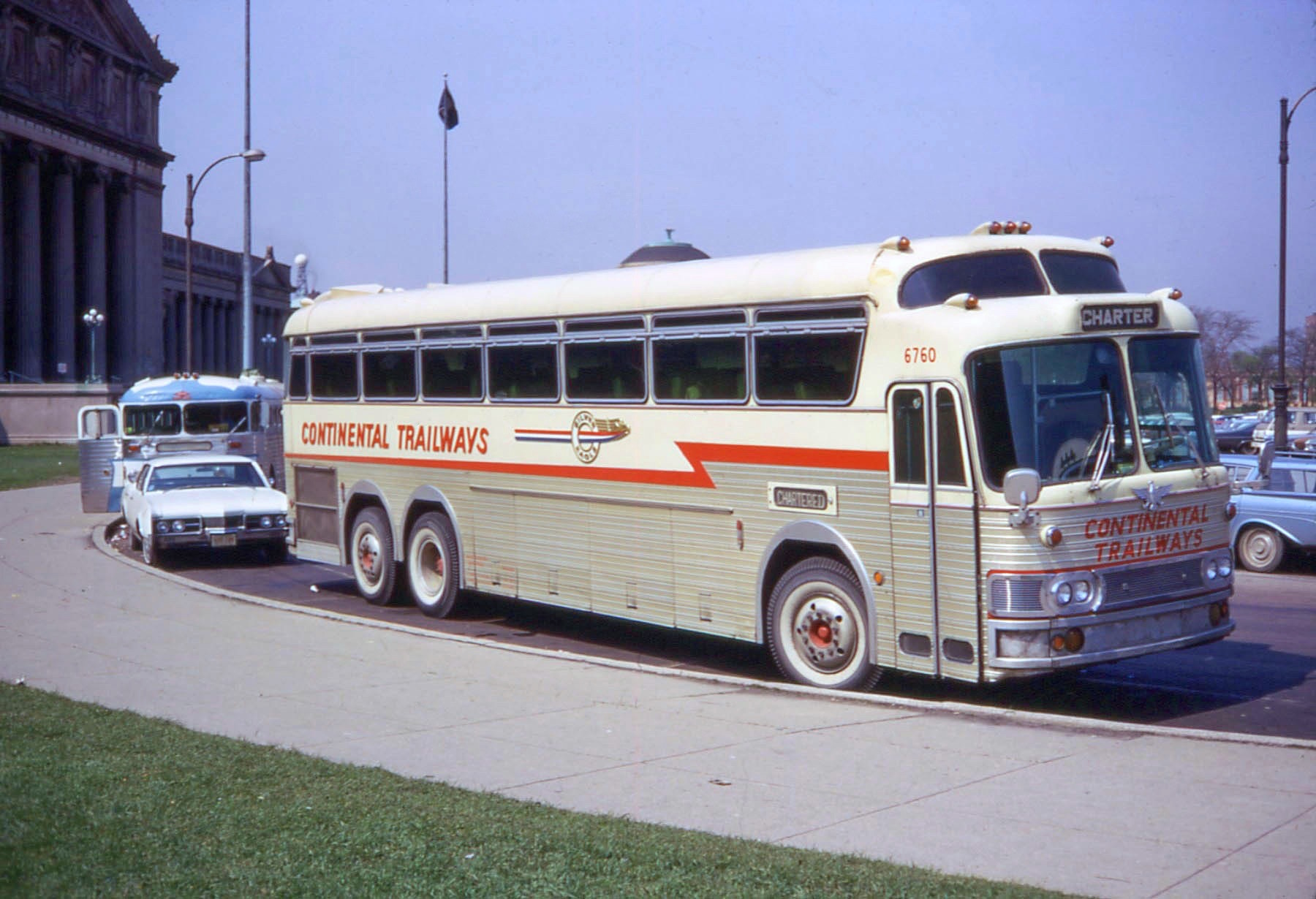
Continental Trailways bus outside the Museum of Science and Industry in Chicago, 1968

== Current members ==
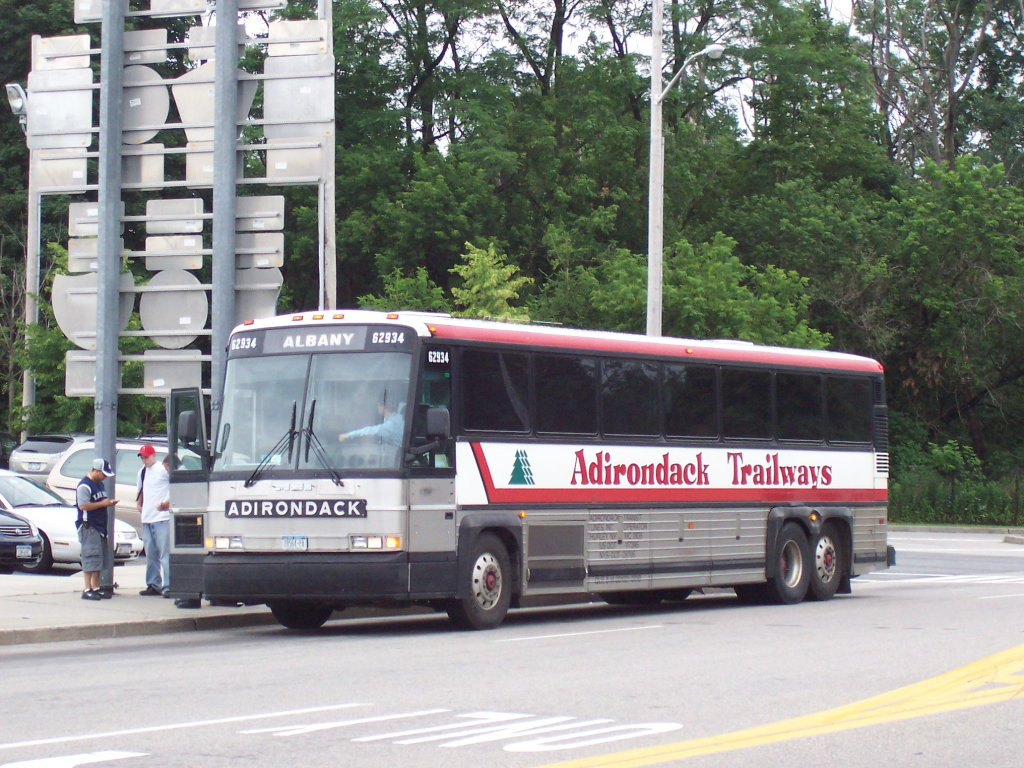
Adirondack Trailways bus in Nanuet, New York

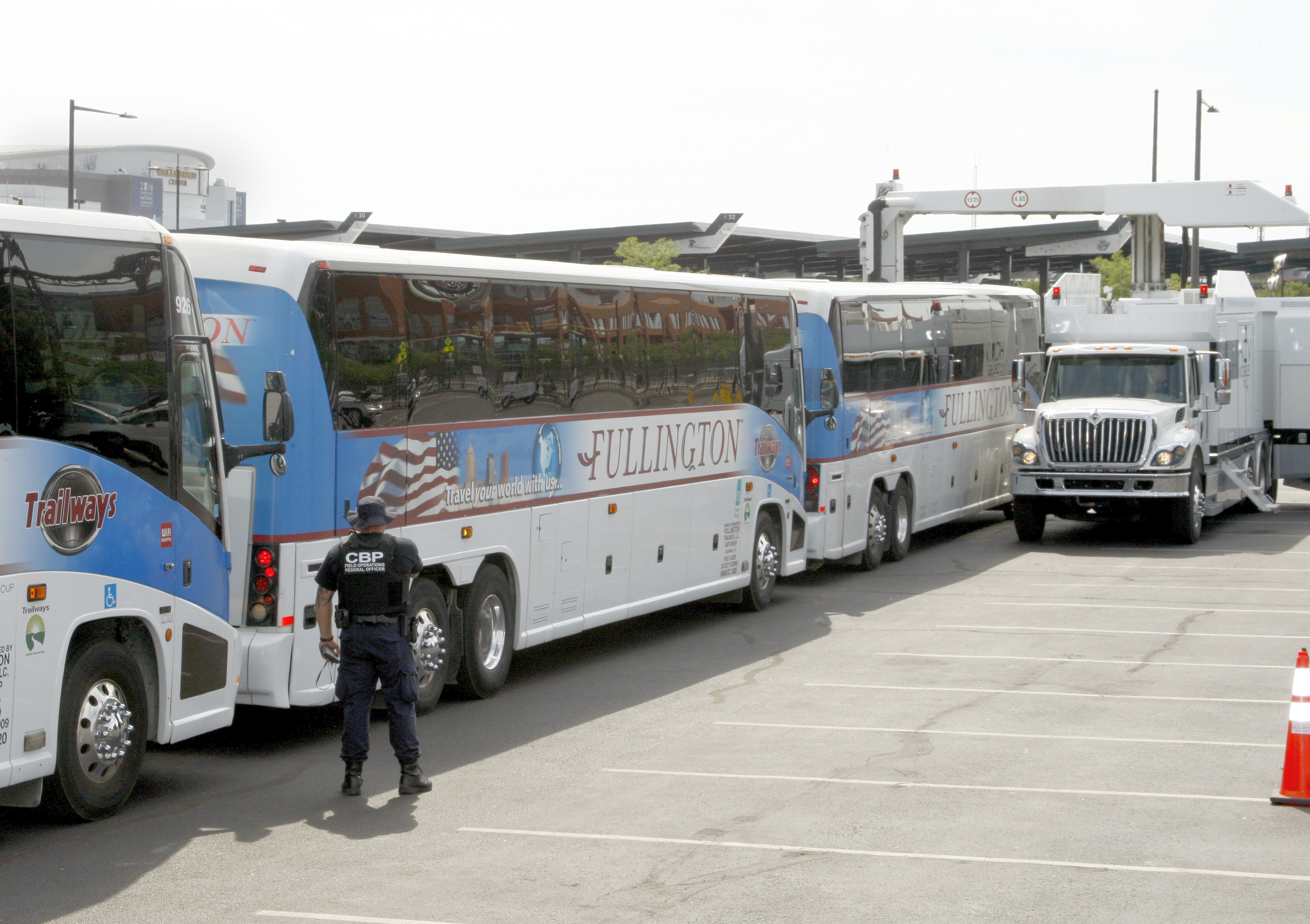
U.S. Customs and Border Protection scans Fullington Trailways buses carrying delegates into the 2016 Democratic National Convention

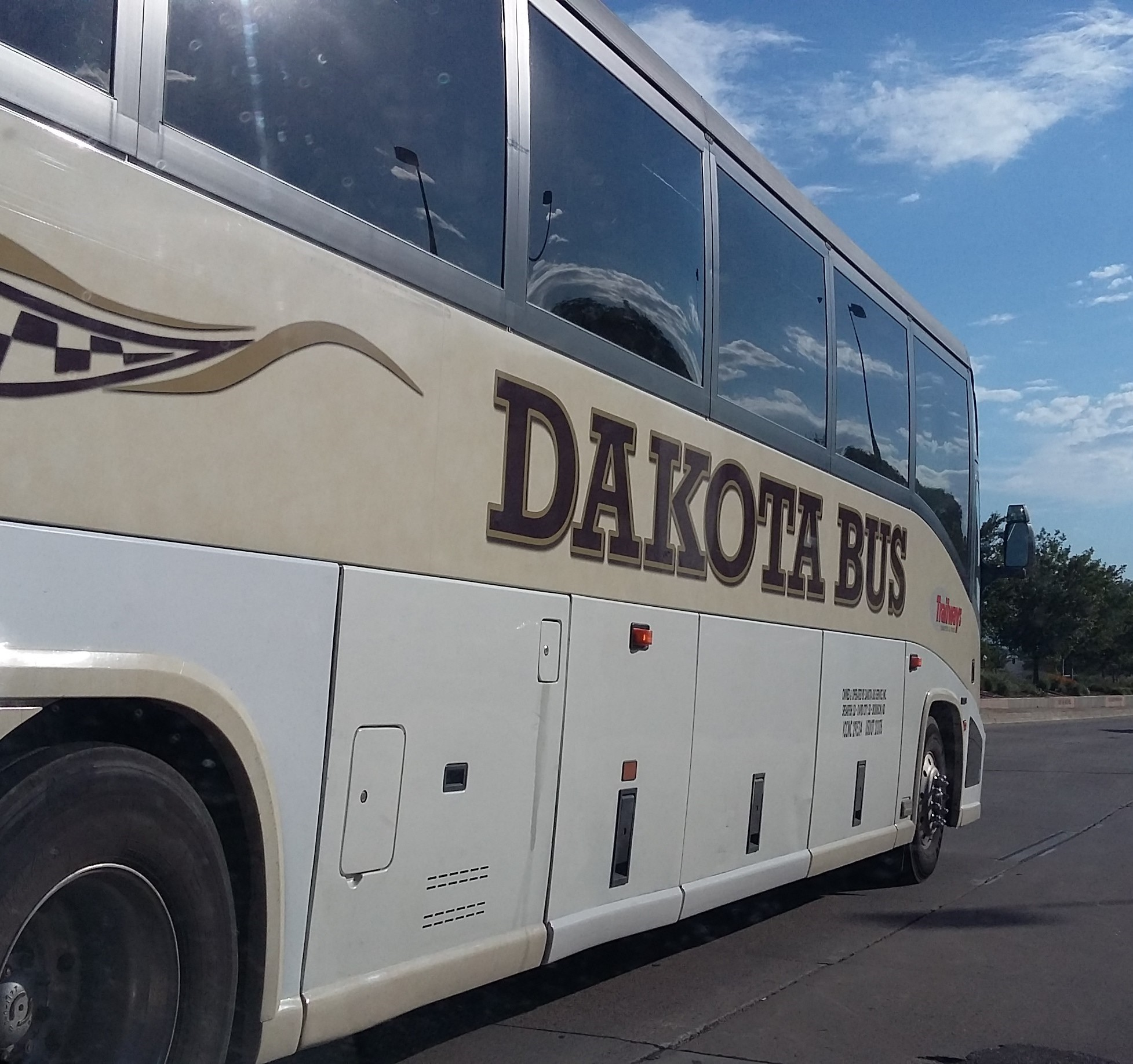
Dakota Trailways bus in Denver, 2016

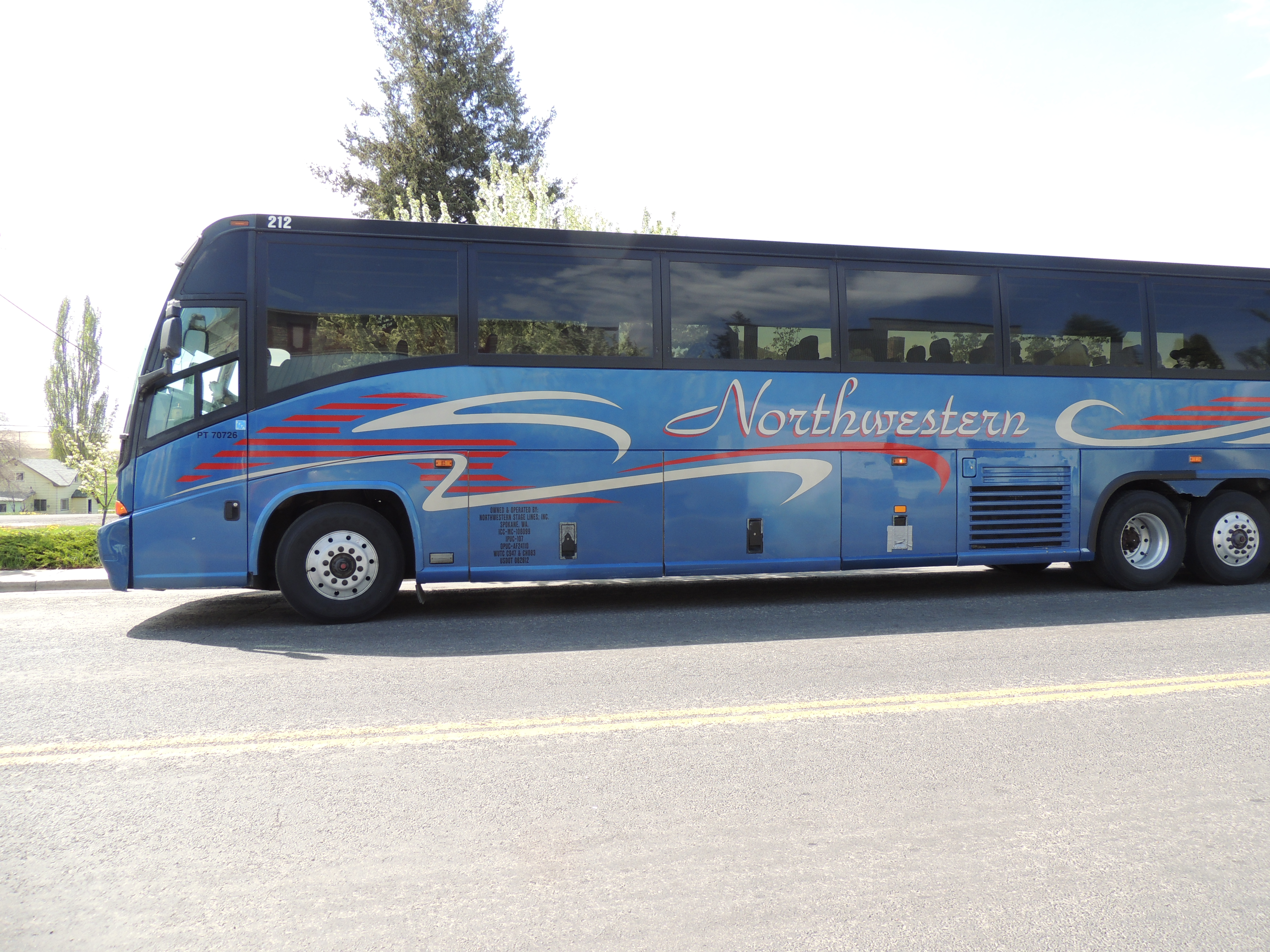
Northwestern Trailways bus in Craigmont, Idaho

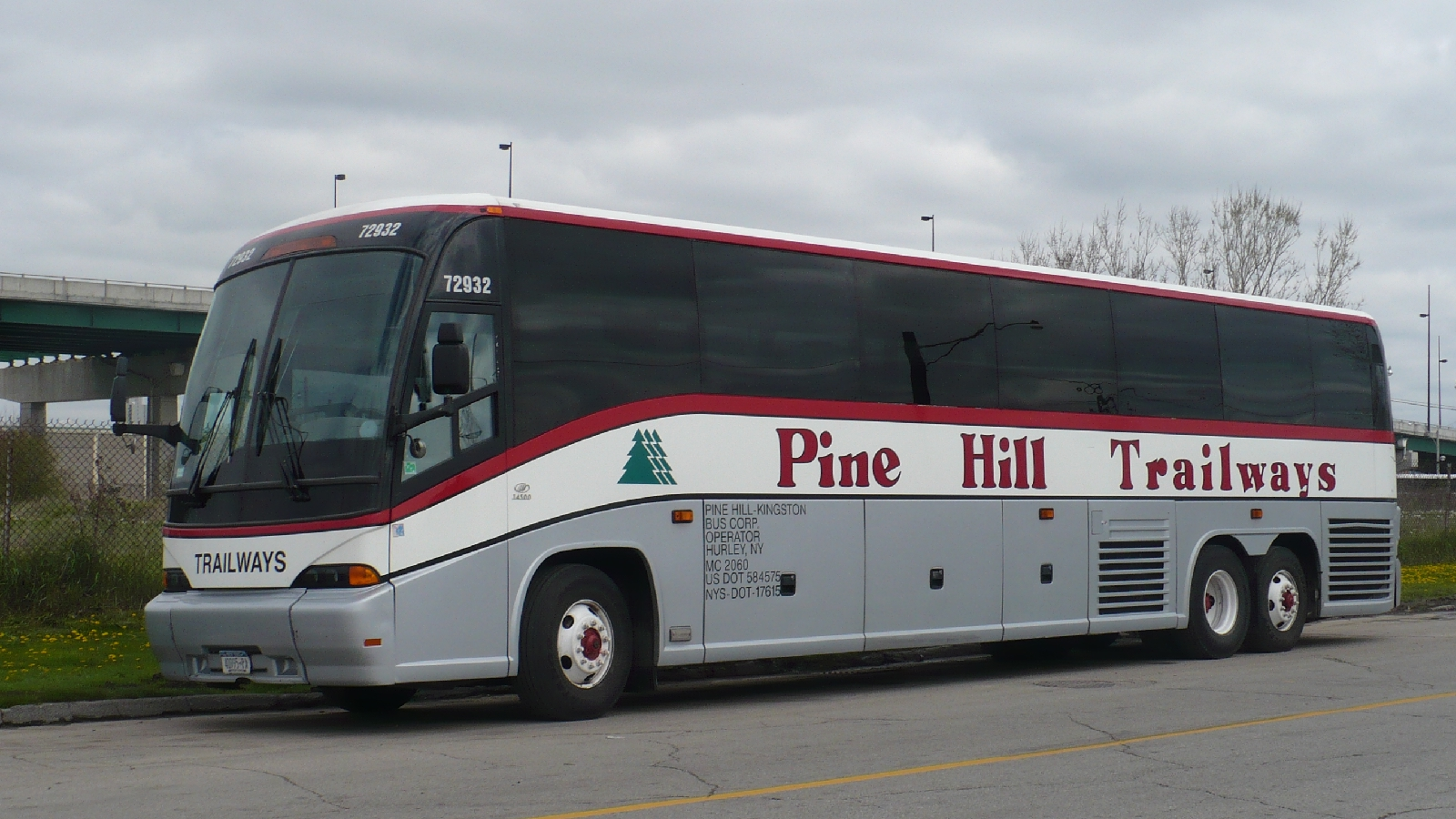
Pine Hill Trailways bus

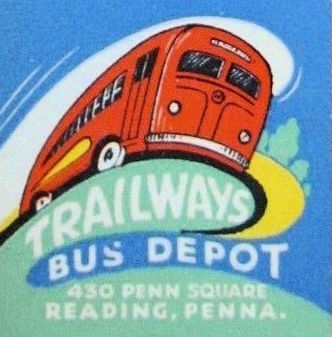
"Trailways Bus Depot" art in 1949

Today Trailways members are spread across North America. They provide charter bus service, bus tours and scheduled route services, with some members providing regular route service to areas not served by any other bus company on an interlining basis with Greyhound Lines, each other, and independent companies. Members also offer motorcoach charters and tours in competitive markets.

As of April 2023, Trailways members are:

- Amador Trailways of California – Sacramento, California
- Amador Trailways of Nevada – Reno, Nevada
- Aries Trailways – Naperville, Illinois
- Arrow Trailways of Texas – Killeen, Texas
- Burlington Trailways – West Burlington, Iowa
- Capital Trailways of Alabama – Montgomery, Alabama
- Capital Trailways of Huntsville – Madison, Alabama
- Colonial Trailways – Mobile, Alabama
- Dakota Trailways – Spearfish, South Dakota
- David Thomas Trailways – Philadelphia, Pennsylvania
- Dean Trailways – Lansing, Michigan
- Elbo Trailways, the Netherlands – Heino, Netherlands
- First Class Trailways – St. Petersburg, Florida
- Fullington Trailways – State College, Pennsylvania
- Gold Line Trailways – Tuxedo, Maryland
- Great Canadian Trailways – Kitchener, Ontario
- Harmon Brothers Trailways – Union City, Georgia
- Heartland Trailways – Kansas City, Missouri
- Huskey Trailways – Festus, Missouri
- Martz Group – Wilkes-Barre, Pennsylvania
- New York Trailways – Rochester, New York
- Northwestern Trailways – Spokane, Washington
- Pacific Coachways Trailways – Garden Grove, California
- Pine Hill Trailways – Hurley, New York
- Precious Cargo Trailways – Chagrin Falls, Ohio
- Red River Trailways – Shreveport, Louisiana
- Susquehanna Trailways – Williamsport, Pennsylvania
- Trailways of New York – Hurley, New York
- Thrasher Brothers Trailways – Birmingham, Alabama
- Utah Trailways – Salt Lake City, Utah
- VIA Trailways of Arizona – Tempe, Arizona
- VIA Trailways of Fresno – Fresno, California
- VIA Trailways of Merced – Merced, California
- Viking Trailways – Joplin, Missouri
- West Point Tours Trailways – Vails Gate, New York

== See also ==
- Coach USA
- Jefferson Lines
- Laidlaw
- List of bus transit systems in the United States
- Peter Pan Bus Lines
