= McIlwaine =

McIlwaine is a surname. Notable people with the surname include:

- Ellen McIlwaine (1945–2021), American singer-songwriter and musician
- Garry McIlwaine (born 1944), Australian politician
- George Arthren McIlwaine (c. 1905–1930), South African rugby union player
- Henry Read McIlwaine (1864–1934), American librarian
- Johnny McIlwaine (1904–1980), Scottish footballer
- Richard McIlwaine (born 1950), English cricketer
- Richard McIlwaine (educator) (1835–1913), American theologian and college president
- Robert McIlwaine (1924–2015), American lawyer and public official

== See also ==
- McIlwaine House, a historic house in Petersburg, Virginia, United States
