= Petersburg Trailways Bus Station =

- U.S. National Register of Historic Places
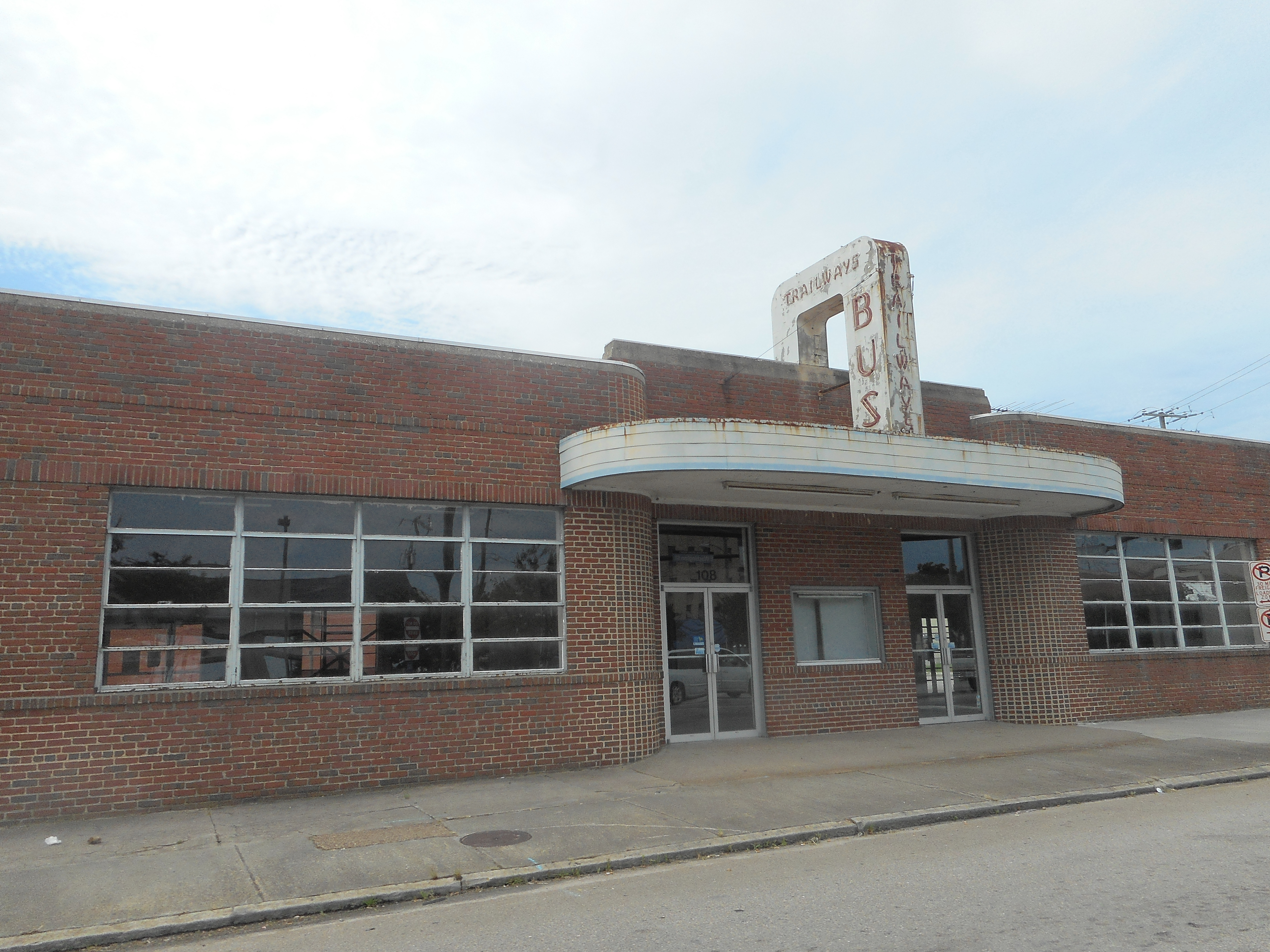
- The door to the Trailways Bus Terminal on East Washington Street, June 21, 2016.

- Location within Virginia Location within the United States
- Location: 108 E. Washington St., Petersburg, Virginia
- Coordinates: 37°13′41″N 77°24′6″W
- Area: less than one acre
- Built: 1946
- NRHP reference No.: 150000680
- Added to NRHP: September 29, 2015

The Petersburg Trailways Bus Station is a historic transportation terminal building at 108 East Washington Street in Petersburg, Virginia. Built by the Trailways bus system in 1946, this example of Moderne architecture is one of the state's best surviving examples of a little-altered mid-20th century bus terminal. It is a roughly T-shaped masonry building with curved corners, and a recessed entry under a canopy labelled "Trailways Bus". The interior has relatively little alteration, limited to the removal of the fixtures related to a whites-only dining counter in one area of the building.

During Freedom Rides organized by the Congress of Racial Equality, the building was a stop on the Trailways-operated portions of both the Journey of Reconciliation in 1947, and the Freedom Rides of 1961.

The building was listed on the National Register of Historic Places in 2015.

== See also ==
- National Register of Historic Places listings in Petersburg, Virginia
