= Bessie Niemeyer Marshall =

American artist

- Born: Sarah Elizabeth Niemeyer; December 25, 1884; Portsmouth, Virginia
- Died: February 14, 1960 (aged 75); Portsmouth, Virginia
- Known for: Painting (watercolor)

Bessie Niemeyer Marshall was an American botanical illustrator known for her watercolor paintings of the wildflowers of Lee Memorial Park. Her artwork documented the variety of plant species being preserved in Lee Memorial Park, a Works Progress Administration-funded wildflower and bird sanctuary in Petersburg, Virginia.

Born Sarah Elizabeth Niemeyer on December 25, 1884, in Portsmouth, Virginia, Bessie Niemeyer married Myron Barrand Marshall, an Episcopalian priest, in 1907 and had nine children. After service in parishes in the Philippines and in Virginia, the family settled in Petersburg in 1937.

In 1935, the city of Petersburg, using W.P.A. (Women's and Professional Division) funds, authorized the creation of a 25-acre wildflower sanctuary in Lee Memorial Park. Under the direction of Petersburg Garden Club member Mary Donald Claiborne Holden, African American women labored on the project through 1940, clearing ravines, building ten miles of paths, and planting 365,00 plants, including 8,000 trees and 37,000 shrubs and more than one million honeysuckle roots to prevent erosion. In 1937, Holden hired Marshall to paint watercolors of the dried and pressed plant specimens of Lee Park flora. A self-taught artist, Marshall produced 238 watercolors of the Lee Park herbarium specimens; the paintings and 325 specimens were stored together in fourteen brown scrapbooks, ultimately housed for almost fifty years in the Petersburg Public Library. The collection was rediscovered by the Petersburg Garden Club in the 1990s. The current location of the collection is at Lewis Ginter Botanical Garden.

Although she pursued other illustration assignments, Marshall had no other major commissions. She died on February 14, 1960, in Portsmouth, Virginia.

Lee Memorial Park is now on the National Register of Historic Places. Marshall and the Lee Park W.P.A. project are the subjects of a monograph published in 2000. In 2014, fourteen reproductions of Marshall's paintings were exhibited in a joint show with reproductions of paintings by Mark Catesby and in 2016, the Petersburg Area Art League exhibited 20 reproductions of Marshall's paintings. In 2018 the Virginia Capitol Foundation announced that Marshall's name would be on the Virginia Women's Monument's glass Wall of Honor.
