= William McKenney House =

Historic house in Virginia, United States

- U.S. National Register of Historic Places
- Virginia Landmarks Register
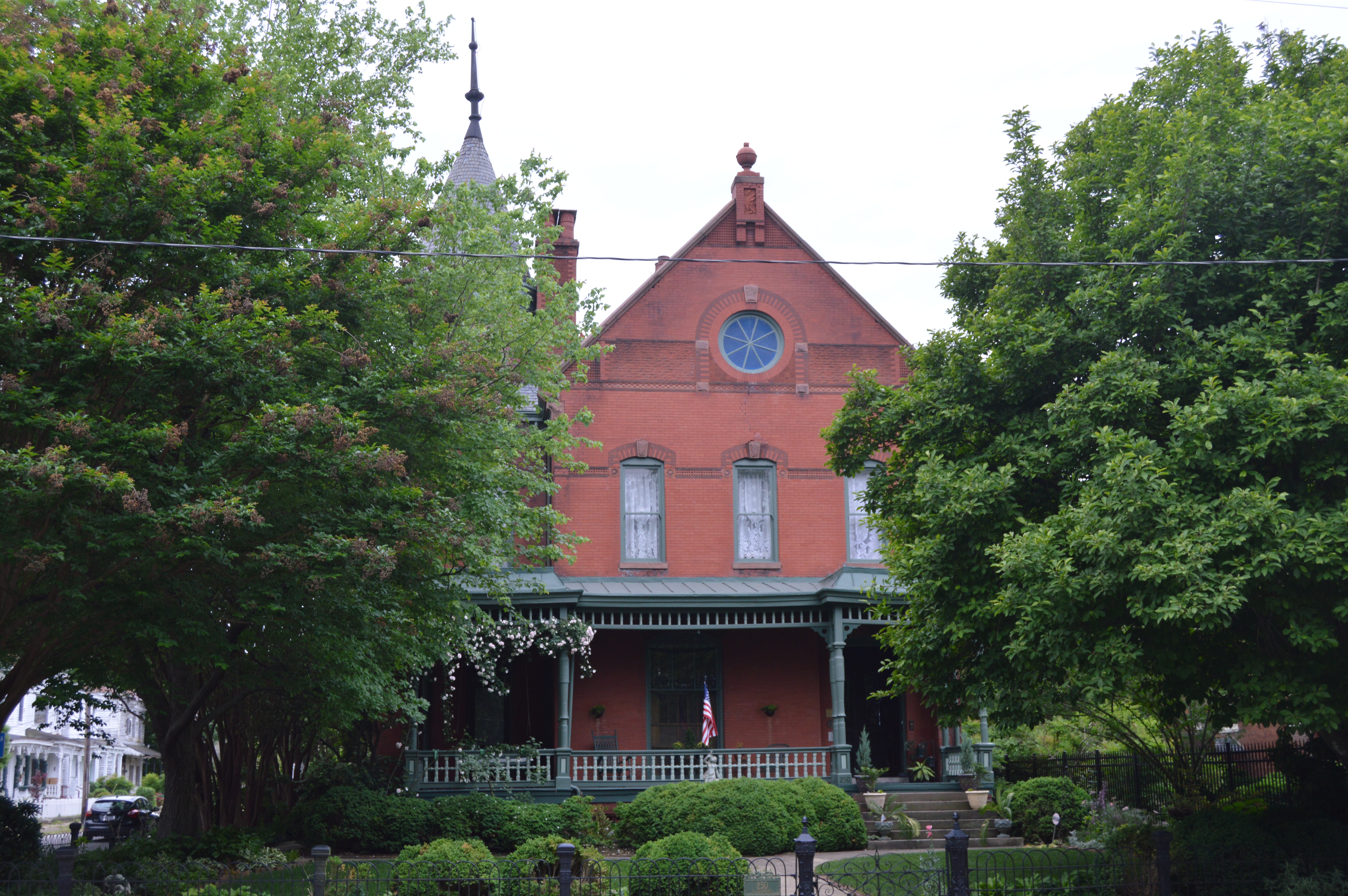
- Front of the house

- Location within Virginia Location within the United States
- Location: 250 S. Sycamore St., Petersburg, Virginia
- Coordinates: 37°13′29″N 77°24′41″W
- Area: Less than 1 acre (0.40 ha)
- Built: 1890
- Architect: Maj. Harrison Waite
- Architectural style: Stick/eastlake, Queen Anne
- NRHP reference No.: 90001830
- VLR No.: 123-0102

Significant dates
- Added to NRHP: December 6, 1990
- Designated VLR: December 12, 1989

William McKenney House, also known as the McKenney-Dunlop-Totty House, is a historic home located in Petersburg, Virginia. It was built in 1890, and is a large 2 1/2-story, Queen Anne / Eastlake style townhouse. It features stained and leaded glass, elaborate pressed brickwork, terra cotta roof trim, and a circular corner tower with a conical roof.

It was listed on the National Register of Historic Places in 1990, and currently serves as a public library. It is located in the Poplar Lawn Historic District.
