= Washington Street Methodist Church =

Historic church in Virginia, US

- Washington Street United Methodist Church
- U.S. National Register of Historic Places
- Virginia Landmarks Register
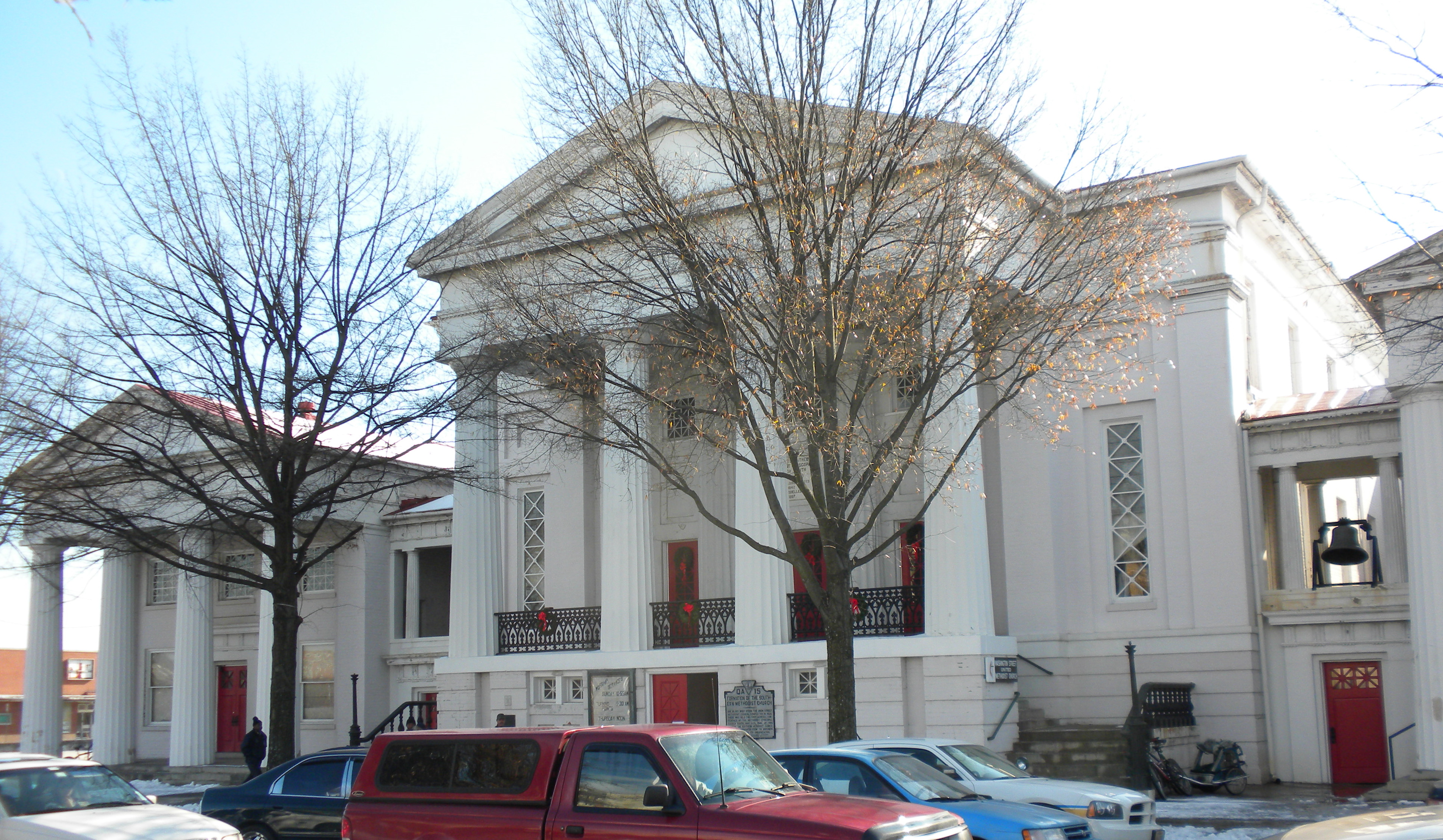
- Washington Street United Methodist Church

- Location within Virginia Location within the United States
- Location: 14-24 E. Washington St., Petersburg, Virginia
- Coordinates: 37°13′39″N 77°24′10″W
- Area: 0.5 acres (0.20 ha)
- Built: 1842
- Architectural style: Greek Revival
- NRHP reference No.: 80004209
- VLR No.: 123-0044

Significant dates
- Added to NRHP: November 24, 1980
- Designated VLR: June 17, 1980

Washington Street United Methodist Church is a historic Methodist church located at Petersburg, Virginia. It was built in 1842, and is a one-story with gallery, brick building in the Greek Revival style. It features a massive Greek Doric order pedimented tetrastyle portico added in 1890. Wings were added in 1922–1923, connected to the main building by columned hyphens.

It was listed on the National Register of Historic Places in 1980.
