= Stewart–Hinton House =

Historic house in Virginia, United States

- U.S. National Register of Historic Places
- Virginia Landmarks Register
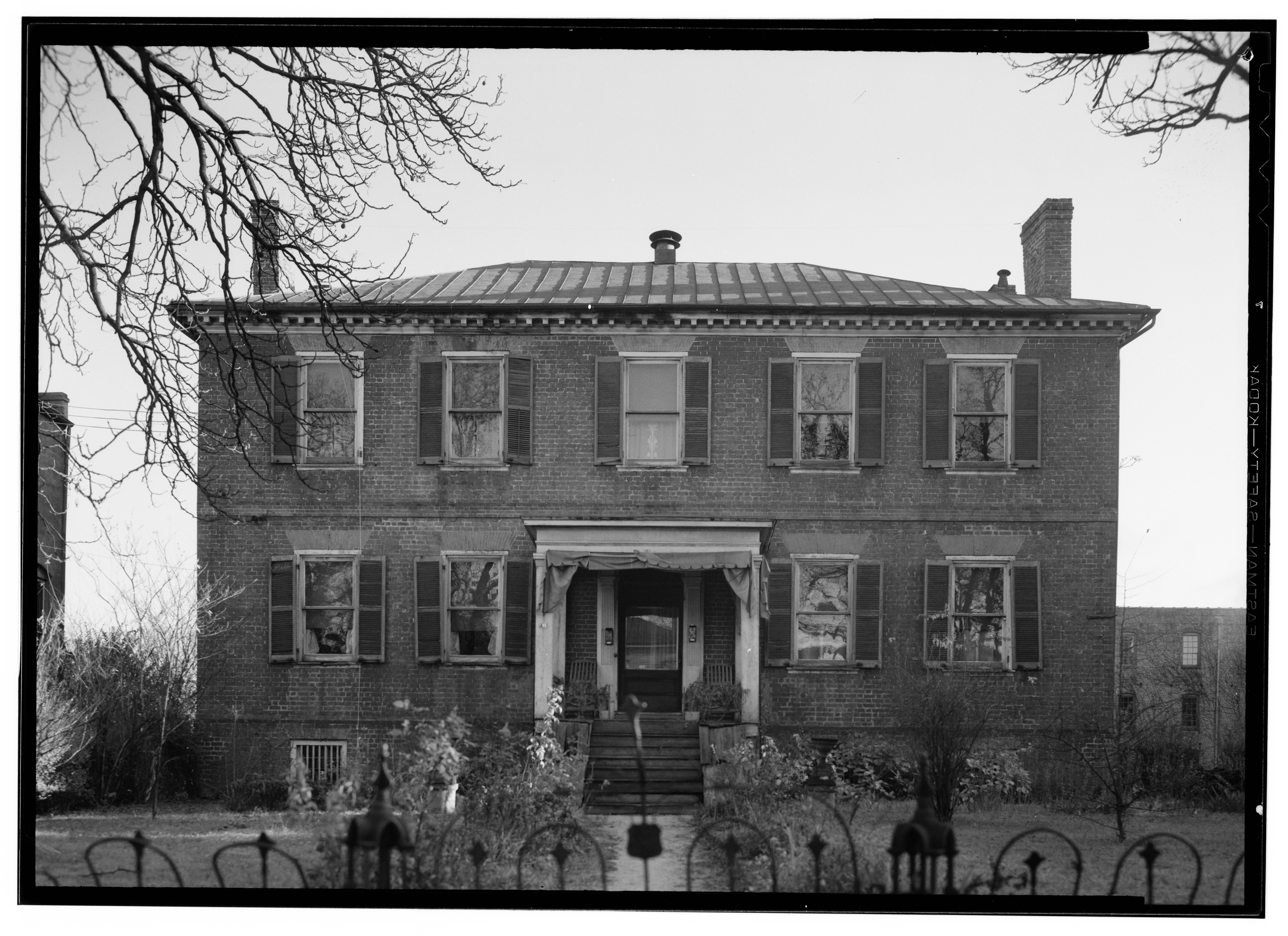
- Hinton House, 416 High Street, Petersburg, Virginia

- Location within Virginia Location within the United States
- Location: 416 High St., Petersburg, Virginia
- Coordinates: 37°13′52″N 77°24′42″W
- Area: less than one acre
- Built: 1798
- Architectural style: Federal
- NRHP reference No.: 03001437
- VLR No.: 123-0055

Significant dates
- Added to NRHP: January 14, 2004
- Designated VLR: June 18, 2003

Stewart–Hinton House is a historic home located at Petersburg, Virginia. It was built about 1798, and is a two-story, five-bay, Federal style brick dwelling. It has a low hipped roof and four rectangular interior end chimneys. The interior features a first-floor hall with arched entrance, elaborate cornice, flat-paneled dado, an unsupported stair and an unusual double-pile parlor with two fireplaces.

It was listed on the National Register of Historic Places in 2004.
