= North Battersea-Pride's Field Historic District =

Historic district in Virginia, United States

- U.S. National Register of Historic Places
- U.S. Historic district
- Virginia Landmarks Register
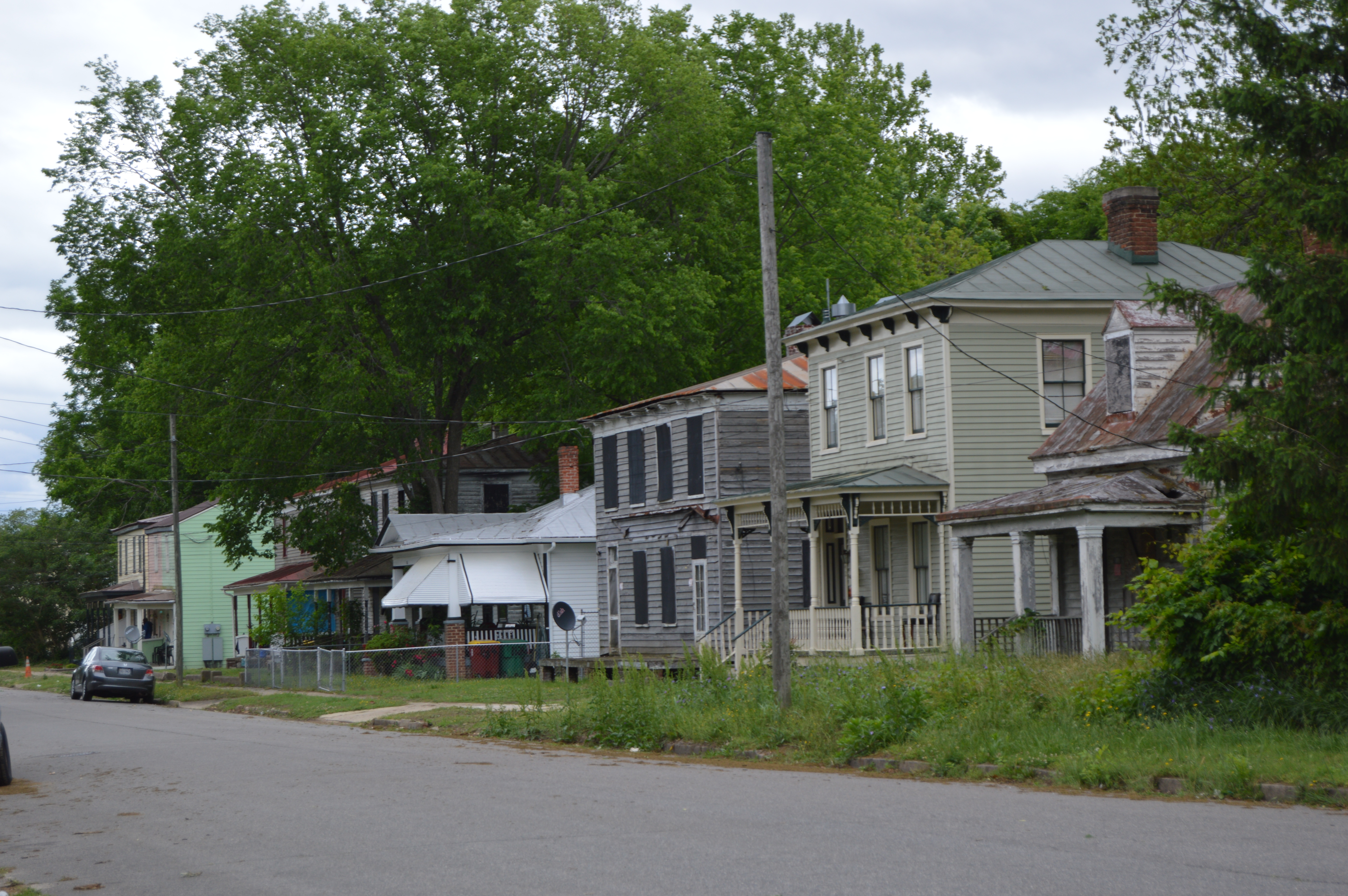
- Houses on High Street

- Location within Virginia Location within the United States
- Location: Roughly along the Appomattox River bank, McKenzie, W. High., Upper Appomattox Sts., from 1250 W. High to Fleet Sts., Petersburg, Virginia
- Coordinates: 37°13′48″N 77°25′20″W
- Area: 98 acres (40 ha)
- Built: 1810
- Architectural style: Queen Anne, Gothic Revival, et al.
- NRHP reference No.: 05000475
- VLR No.: 123-5035

Significant dates
- Added to NRHP: May 26, 2005
- Designated VLR: March 16, 2005

North Battersea-Pride's Field Historic District is a national historic district located at Petersburg, Virginia. The district includes 156 contributing buildings and 2 contributing sites (the Battersea Canal and South Canal) located in a predominantly residential section of Petersburg. It includes a varied collection of mid- to late 19th- and early 20th-century middle and working-class houses and includes notable examples of Queen Anne and Gothic Revival style architecture. Notable buildings include the late-18th century stone toll keeper's house, Montview (c. 1810), Pride's Tavern dependency (c. 1820), and West Street Presbyterian Chapel.

It was listed on the National Register of Historic Places in 2005.
