= Thomas Wallace House =

Historic house in Virginia, United States

- U.S. National Register of Historic Places
- U.S. Historic district – Contributing property
- Virginia Landmarks Register
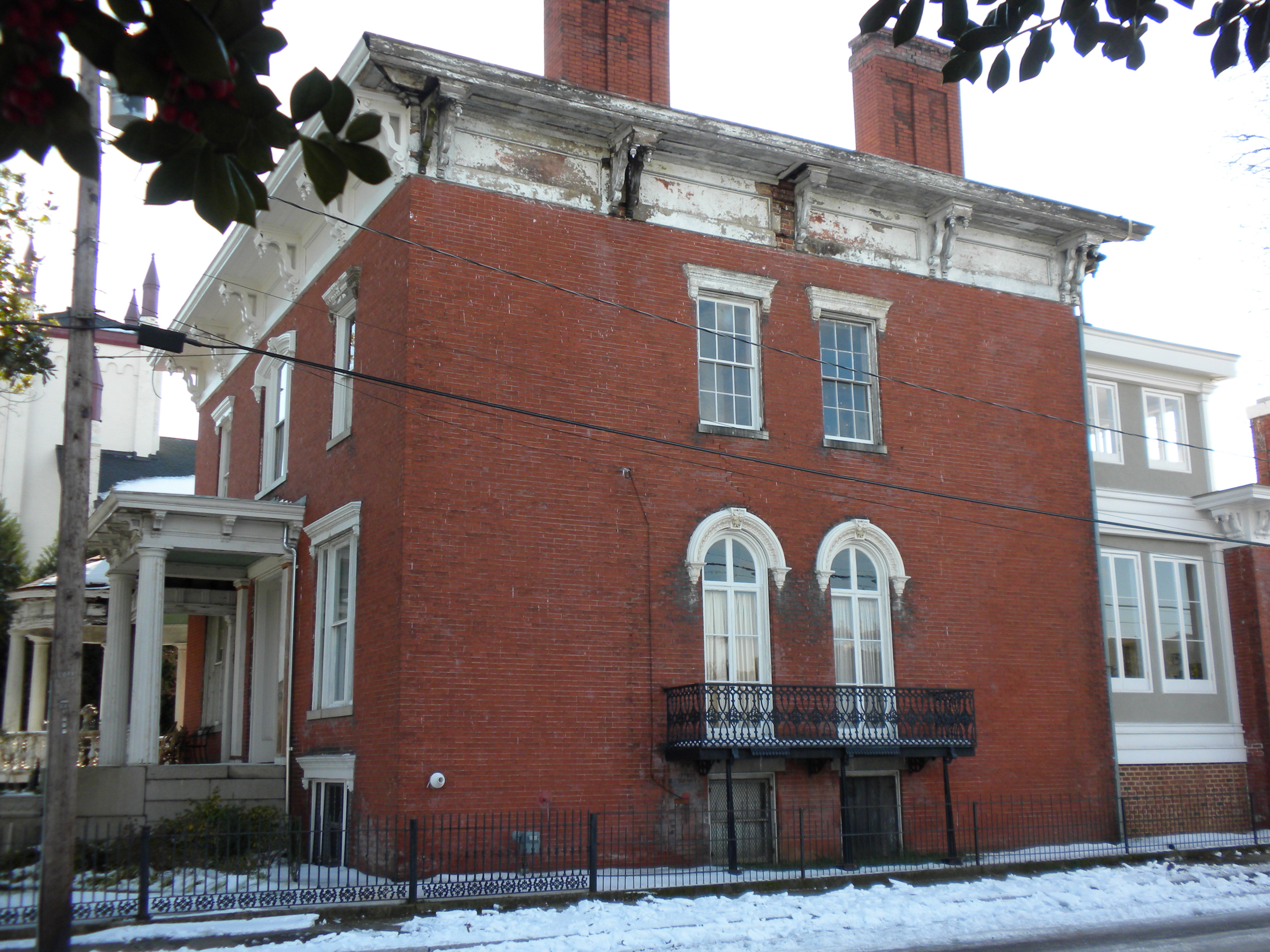
- Thomas Wallace House, December 2009

- Location within Virginia Location within the United States
- Location: SW corner of Brown and S. Market Sts., Petersburg, Virginia
- Coordinates: 37°13′26″N 77°24′22″W
- Area: less than one acre
- Built: c. 1855
- Architectural style: Italianate
- NRHP reference No.: 75002116
- VLR No.: 123-0031

Significant dates
- Added to NRHP: May 2, 1975
- Designated VLR: April 15, 1975

Thomas Wallace House is a historic home located at Petersburg, Virginia. It was built about 1855, and is a two-story, three-bay, pressed brick dwelling in the Italianate style. It sits on a raised basement and has a low hipped roof with bracketed cornice. It has a one-story rear service wing and a front porch supported by six fluted Greek Doric order columns. On April 3, 1865, President Abraham Lincoln and General Ulysses S. Grant met in its library to discuss the inevitable end to the American Civil War and the surrender.

It was listed on the National Register of Historic Places in 1975. It is located in the South Market Street Historic District. It is located 204 South Market, Petersburg.
