= Centre Hill Museum =

Historic house in Virginia, United States

- Centre Hill
- U.S. National Register of Historic Places
- U.S. Historic district – Contributing property
- Virginia Landmarks Register
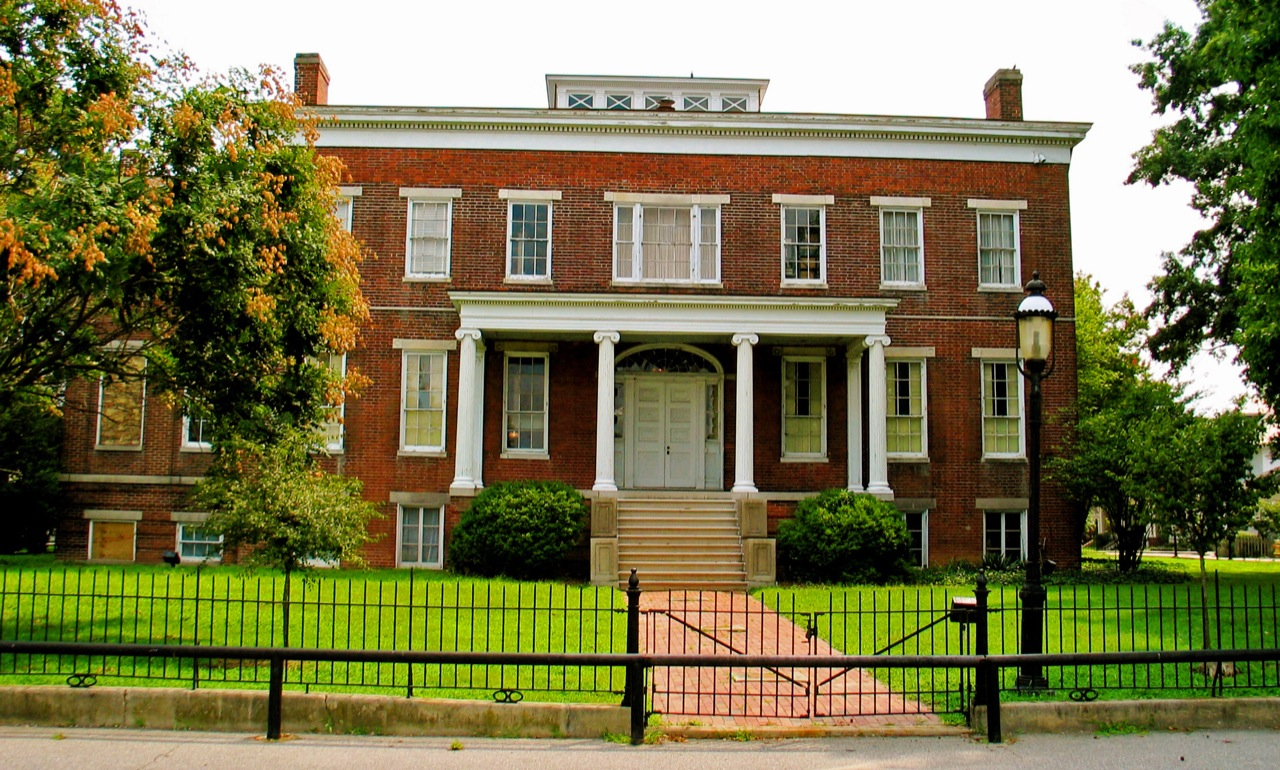
- Center Hill in 2005

- Location within Virginia Location within the United States
- Location: Center Hill Lane, Petersburg, Virginia
- Coordinates: 37°13′50″N 77°24′6″W
- Area: 1 acre (0.40 ha)
- Built: 1823
- Architectural style: Greek Revival, Greek Revival transitional
- NRHP reference No.: 72001514
- VLR No.: 123-0057

Significant dates
- Added to NRHP: December 27, 1972
- Designated VLR: November 21, 1972

Centre Hill Museum, also referred to as Centre Hill Mansion, was built by Revolutionary War veteran Robert Bolling IV in 1823. The Bollings were a very prominent family for many generations, being granted a plot of land in present-day Petersburg by the then King of England. Centre Hill was appropriated as Union headquarters during the reconstruction period, serving as a meeting place for Union General George Hartsuff and President Lincoln in April 1865. President Taft also spent time on the property. Its doors were opened as a museum in the 1950s.

== History ==
The mansion was built in 1823 by Robert Bolling IV, who had served in the Revolutionary Army. An extensive remodeling was undertaken by Robert Buckner Bolling in the 1840s. It is a two-story, five-bay, transitional Greek Revival style brick dwelling. An east wing was added about 1850. The front facade features a has a flat-roofed five-bay verandah supported by six Greek Ionic order columns.

It was listed on the National Register of Historic Places in 1972. It is located in the Centre Hill Historic District.

Today the house encompasses three American architectural styles. The mansion's South Facade is dominated by a Greek Revival-style porch with ionic columns. Greek Revival architectural ornamentation is a feature of the interior, along with elements of early Federal style and later Colonial Revival style.

The 1840s renovation also included construction of a tunnel from the back of the house to nearby Henry Street. Slaves used the tunnel to carry food in and out of the house.

== Notable events ==
President Abraham Lincoln spoke to Union soldiers occupying the mansion during a trip to Petersburg in April 1865. President William Howard Taft was a guest in May 1909.

The mansion was used as a set in the made-for-TV movie Killing Lincoln.

The mansion was also used as the set of the Green family home in the PBS drama Mercy Street (TV series).

== Legends ==
Every January 24, the ghosts of American Civil War soldiers are said to march up the stairs at 7:30 p.m. Twenty minutes later, the specters march back down the stairs and leave, slamming the front door behind them.

Neighbors also have reported seeing a Lady in White standing at an upstairs window.

The museum hosts a "Ghost Watch" on January 24 each year.
