= Centre Hill Historic District =

Historic district in Virginia, United States

- U.S. National Register of Historic Places
- U.S. Historic district
- Virginia Landmarks Register
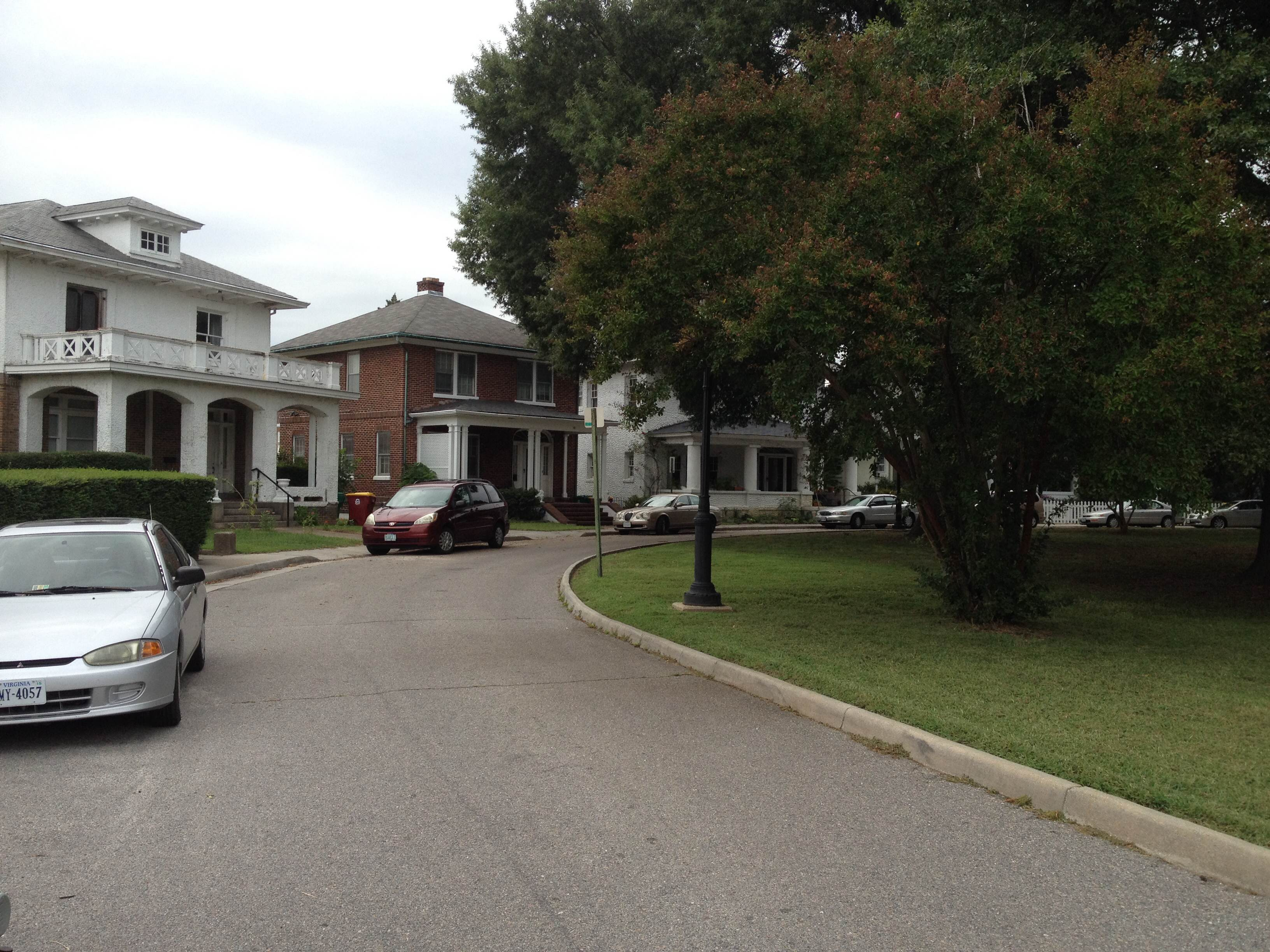

- Location within Virginia Location within the United States
- Location: Henry, N. Adams, N. Jefferson, Franklin, and E. Washington Sts., Centre Hill Ct., and Centre Hill Ave., Petersburg, Virginia
- Coordinates: 37°13′46″N 77°24′00″W
- Area: 19 acres (7.7 ha)
- Architectural style: Greek Revival, Italianate, Colonial Revival;Bungalow
- NRHP reference No.: 86001277
- VLR No.: 123-0025

Significant dates
- Added to NRHP: June 13, 1986
- Designated VLR: October 15, 1985

Centre Hill Historic District is a national historic district located at Petersburg, Virginia. The district includes 81 contributing buildings located in a predominantly residential section of Petersburg. It includes a varied collection of early-19th-century to early-20th century houses and includes notable examples of Greek Revival, Italianate, Colonial Revival, and Bungalow style architecture. Notable buildings include the Centre Hill Apartment Building (1915), Eichberg House, Powell House, Unger House, and St. Joseph's Convent. Located in the district and separately listed is the Centre Hill Museum.

It was listed on the National Register of Historic Places in 1986.
