= Lee Memorial Park =

- Legends Park
- U.S. National Register of Historic Places
- U.S. Historic district
- Virginia Landmarks Register
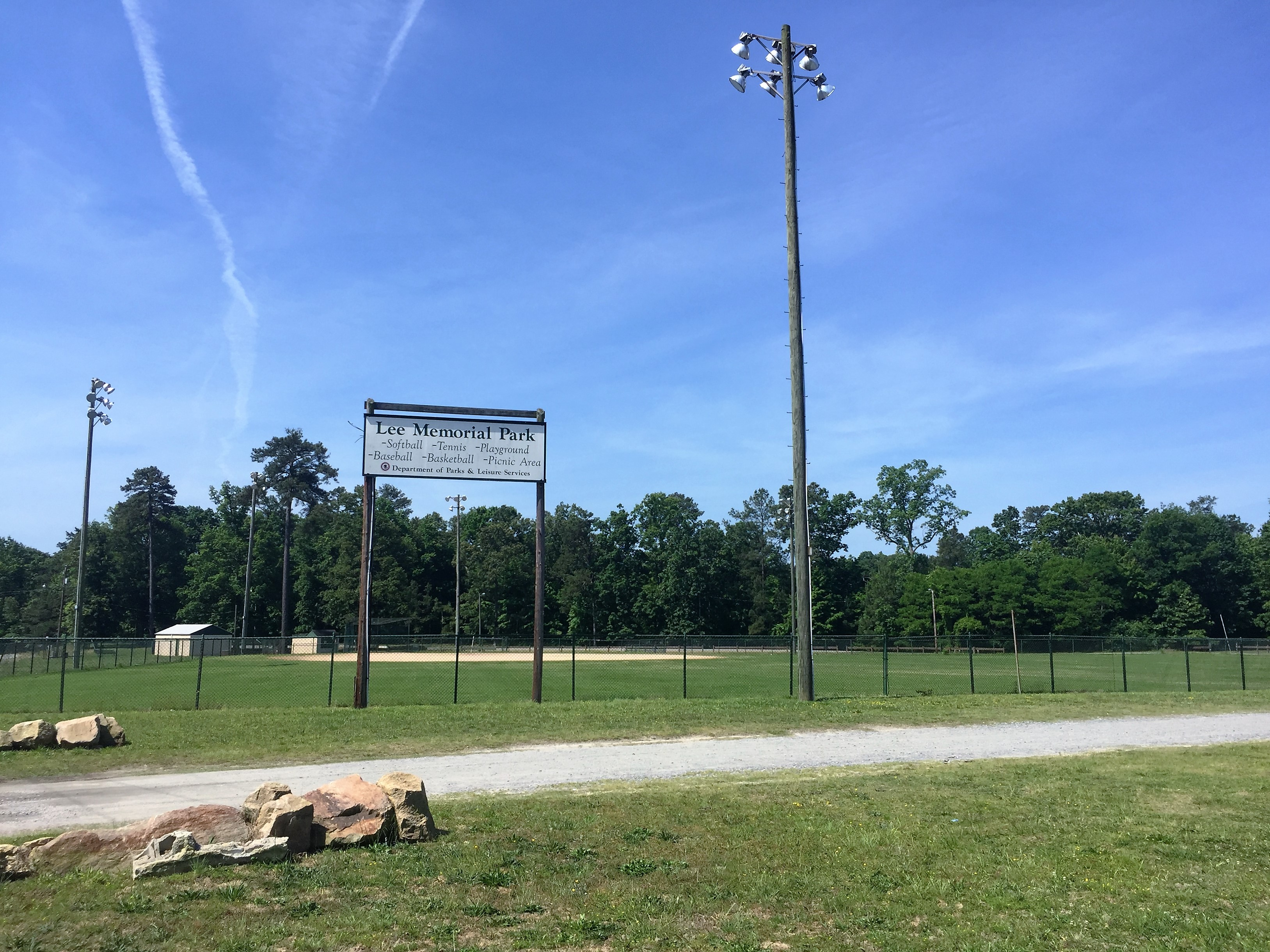
- Entrance to Lee Memorial Park

- Location within Virginia Location within the United States
- Location: 1832 Johnson Rd., Petersburg, Virginia
- Coordinates: 37°11′57″N 77°24′24″W
- Area: 300 acres (120 ha)
- Built: 1921
- Architect: Petersburg Garden Club
- Architectural style: naturalistic landscape
- NRHP reference No.: 00000896
- VLR No.: 123-0083

Significant dates
- Added to NRHP: August 14, 2000
- Designated VLR: June 14, 2000

Legends Park (Formerly Lee Memorial Park) is a historic park and national historic district located at Petersburg, Virginia. The district includes two contributing buildings, three contributing sites, and two contributing structures. They are the park superintendent's house, the bathhouse, Willcox Lake reservoir, the Civil War earthworks, the park's system of roadways, paths and trails, the park's general topography and the Lee Park Wild Flower and Bird Sanctuary created by the Works Progress Administration between 1935 and 1940. As part of the W.P.A. project, Petersburg artist Bessie Niemeyer Marshall painted 238 watercolors of Lee Park herbarium specimens.

It was listed on the National Register of Historic Places in 2000.
