= South Chappell Street Car Barn =

Street car depot in Petersburg, Virginia, US

- U.S. National Register of Historic Places
- Virginia Landmarks Register
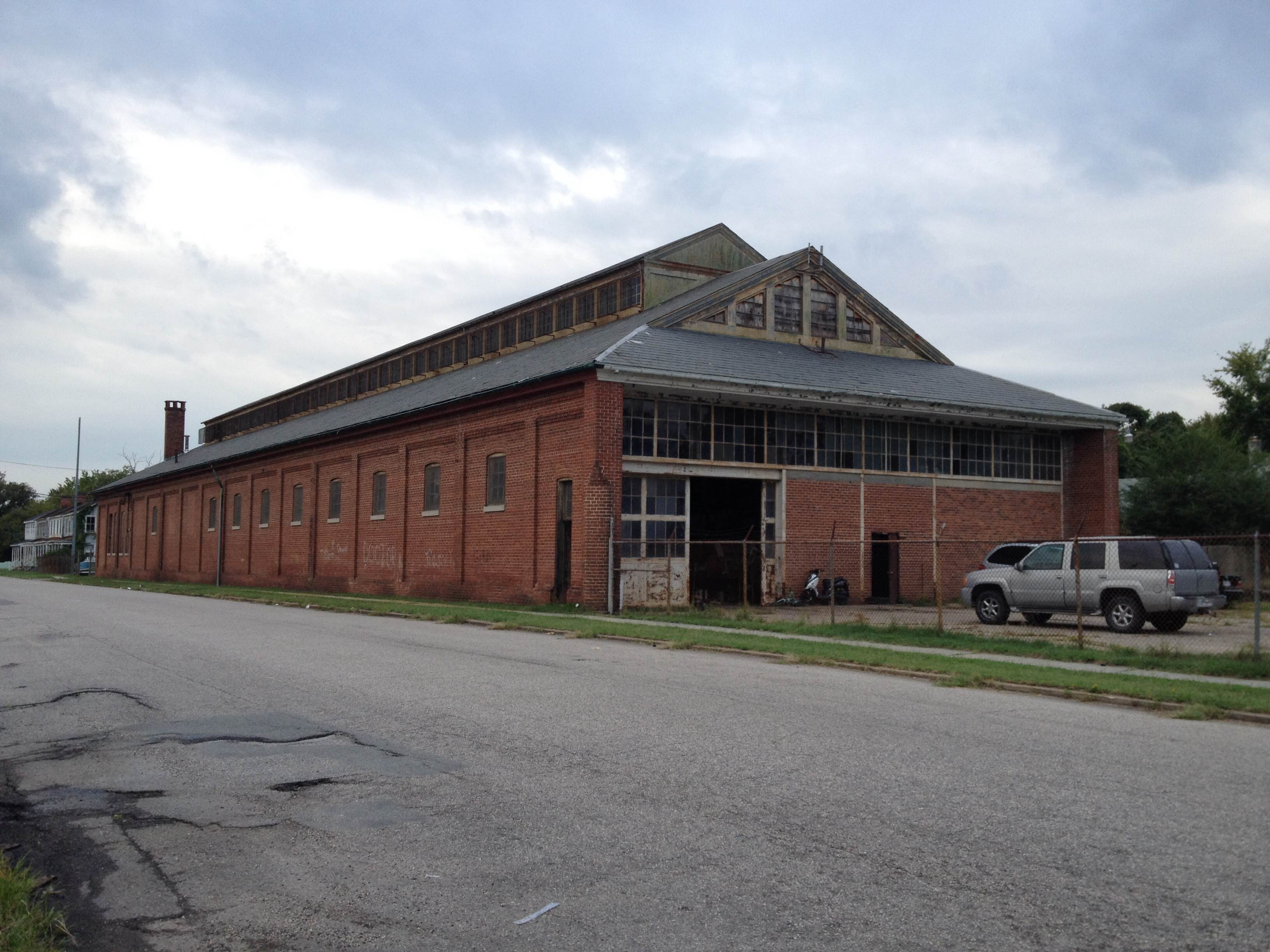

- Location within Virginia Location within the United States
- Location: 124 South Chappell St., Petersburg, Virginia, United States
- Coordinates: 37°13′48″N 77°26′2″W
- Area: 1.2 acres (0.49 ha)
- Built: 1899-1903
- NRHP reference No.: 09000066
- VLR No.: 123-5421

Significant dates
- Added to NRHP: February 25, 2009
- Designated VLR: December 18, 2008

South Chappell Street Car Barn is a historic street car repair building located at Petersburg, Virginia. It was built between 1899 and 1903, and is a one-story, 16 bay long, rectangular brick building. It has a steel truss roof and monitor roof window. Also on the property is a contributing one-story frame building.

It was listed on the National Register of Historic Places in 2009.
