= South Market Street Historic District =

Historic district in Virginia, United States

- U.S. National Register of Historic Places
- U.S. Historic district
- Virginia Landmarks Register
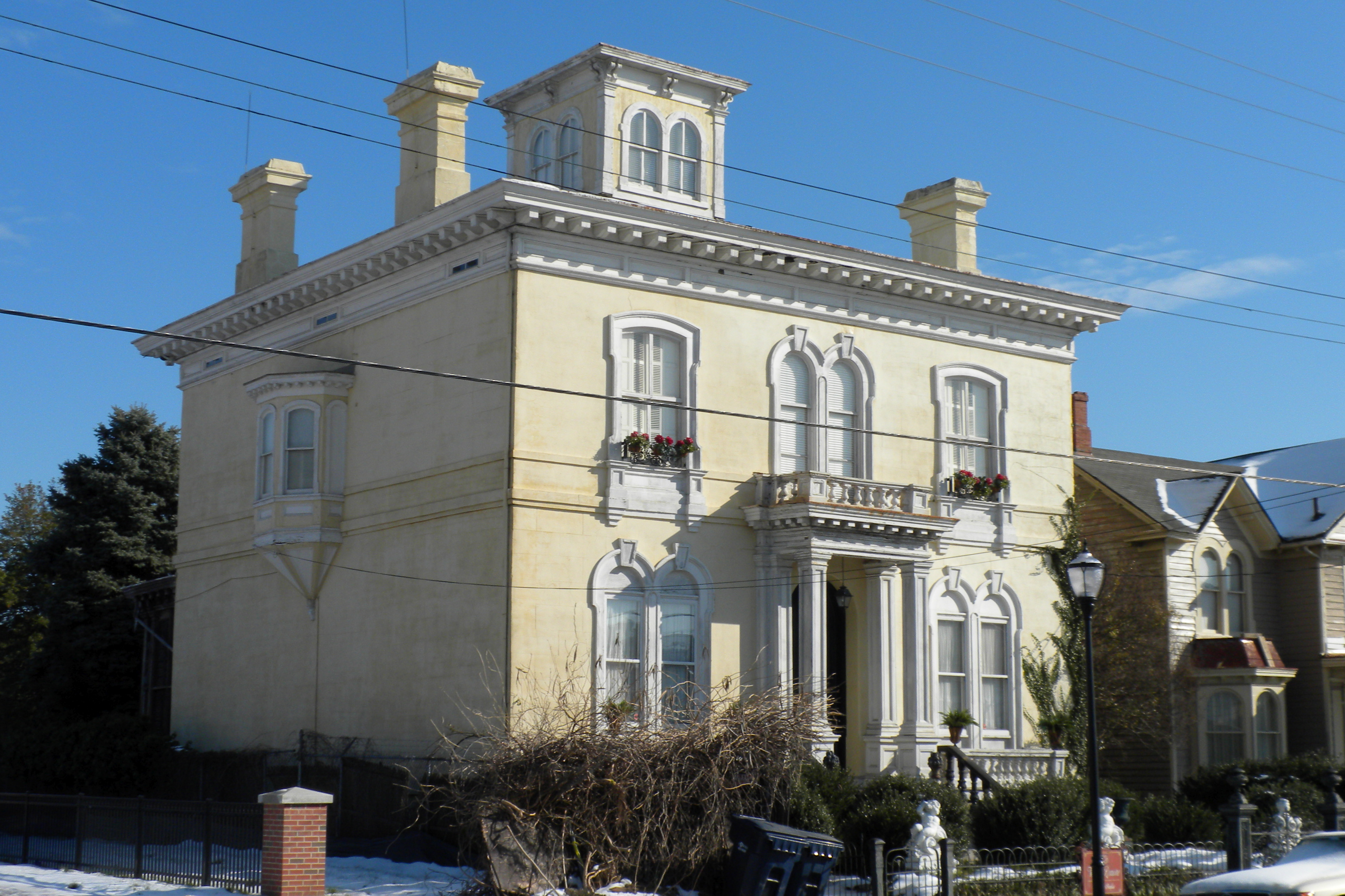
- Mahone House, December 2009

- Location within Virginia Location within the United States
- Location: S. Market St. from Washington St. to Halifax St., Petersburg, Virginia
- Coordinates: 37°13′29″N 77°24′23″W
- Area: 6.5 acres (2.6 ha)
- Built: 1865
- Architect: Machen, R.A.
- Architectural style: Mid 19th Century Revival, Colonial Revival, Late Victorian
- NRHP reference No.: 92000345
- VLR No.: 123-0108

Significant dates
- Added to NRHP: April 22, 1992
- Designated VLR: June 19, 1991

South Market Street Historic District is a national historic district located at Petersburg, Virginia. The district includes 15 contributing buildings and 1 contributing object located in a predominantly residential section of Petersburg. It includes a varied collection of mid- to late-19th-century houses and includes notable examples of Late Victorian and Colonial Revival style architecture. Notable buildings include the Mt. Olivet Baptist Church (1858), Scott House (1855), and Williams House (1879). Located in the district and separately listed is the Thomas Wallace House.

It was listed on the National Register of Historic Places in 1992.
