= Sutherland House (Petersburg, Virginia) =

Historic house in Virginia, United States

- U.S. National Register of Historic Places
- Virginia Landmarks Register
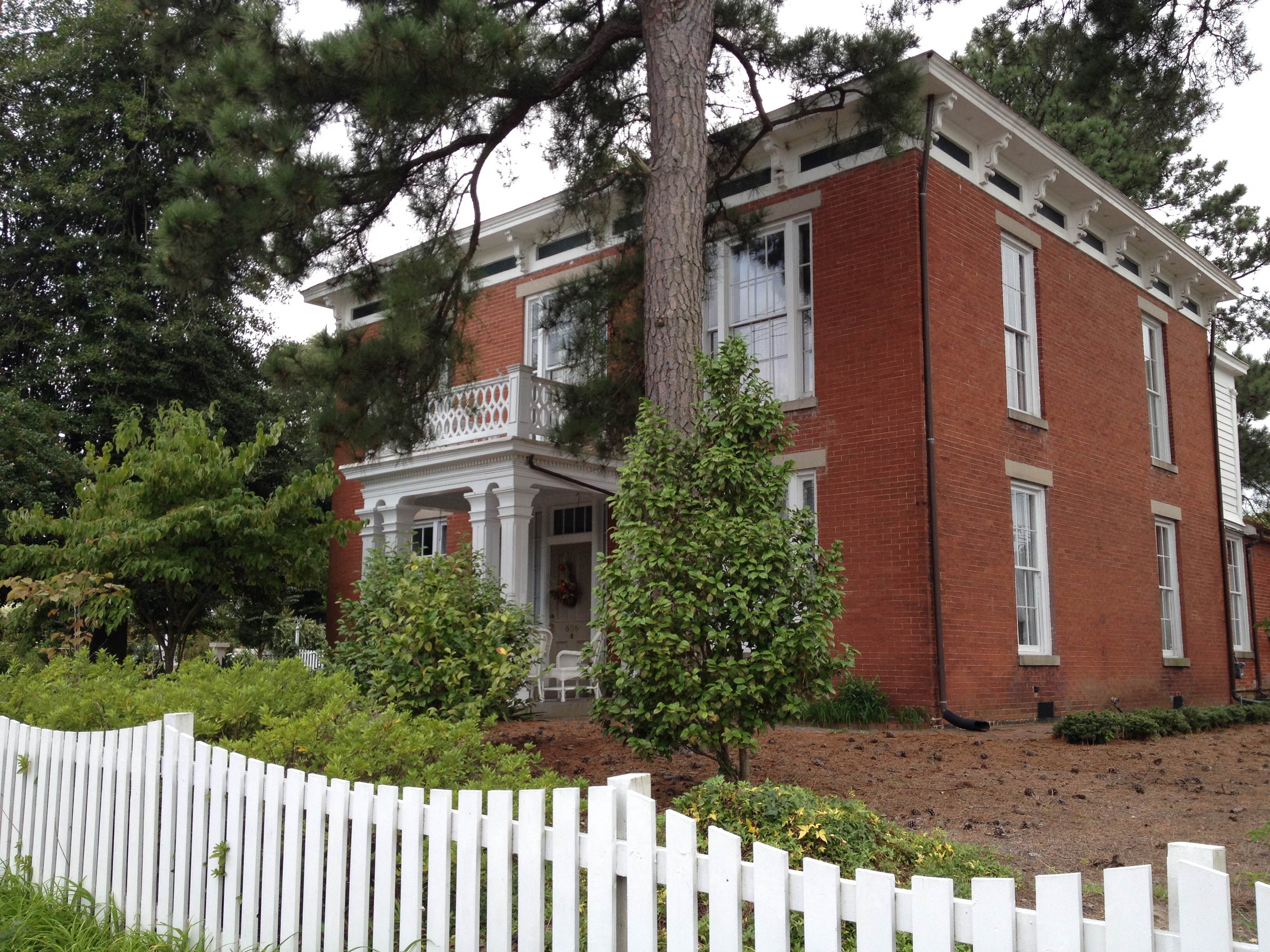

- Location within Virginia Location within the United States
- Location: 606 Harding St., Petersburg, Virginia
- Coordinates: 37°13′04″N 77°24′19″W
- Area: 1 acre (0.40 ha)
- Built: 1860-1862, 1838, 1877
- Architectural style: Italianate
- NRHP reference No.: 11000837
- VLR No.: 123-0006

Significant dates
- Added to NRHP: November 22, 2011
- Designated VLR: September 22, 2011

Sutherland House, also known as the Sutherland-Hite House and Logan House, is a historic home located at Petersburg, Virginia. It was built between 1860 and 1862, and is a two-story, three-bay, Italianate style brick dwelling. The house incorporates an 1838, one-story, former dwelling as a rear ell, and a frame addition built in 1877. The main house has a double-pile, central passage plan. The house features two unusual chimneys made up of clustered flues on a low-hipped slate roof, tripartite windows, and a Doric order portico at the entry. Also on the property is a contributing two-story, four room brick service building.

It was listed on the National Register of Historic Places in 2011.
