= Joseph Elliston House =

Historic house in Tennessee, United States

- U.S. National Register of Historic Places
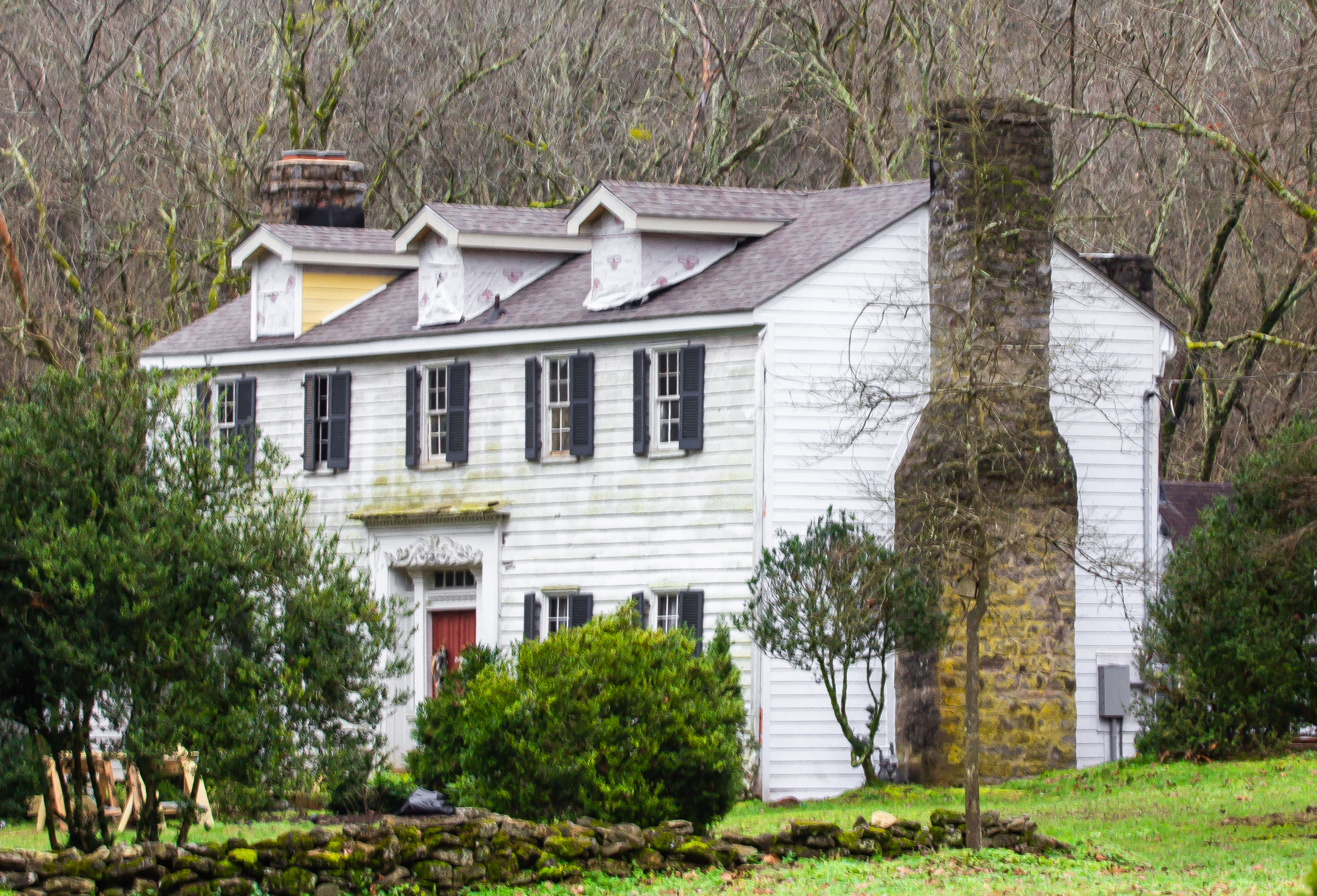

- Location within Tennessee Location within the United States
- Location: 2766 Hillsboro Rd./ Brentwood, Tennessee
- Coordinates: 36.026103°N 86.877504°W
- Area: 2 acres (0.81 ha)
- Built: c. 1817
- Architectural style: Federal, central hall plan
- MPS: Williamson County MRA
- NRHP reference No.: 88000291
- Added to NRHP: April 13, 1988

The Joseph Elliston House, also known as the Cohen House, is a c. 1817 Federal-style center-hall house in Brentwood, Tennessee.

As of 1988, it had original weatherboard siding, and it has large exterior end limestone chimneys.

It was listed on the National Register of Historic Places in 1988. When listed the property included one contributing building, two non-contributing buildings, and one non-contributing structure, on 2 acres (0.81 ha).
