= Virginia Trunk & Bag Company =

- U.S. National Register of Historic Places
- Virginia Landmarks Register
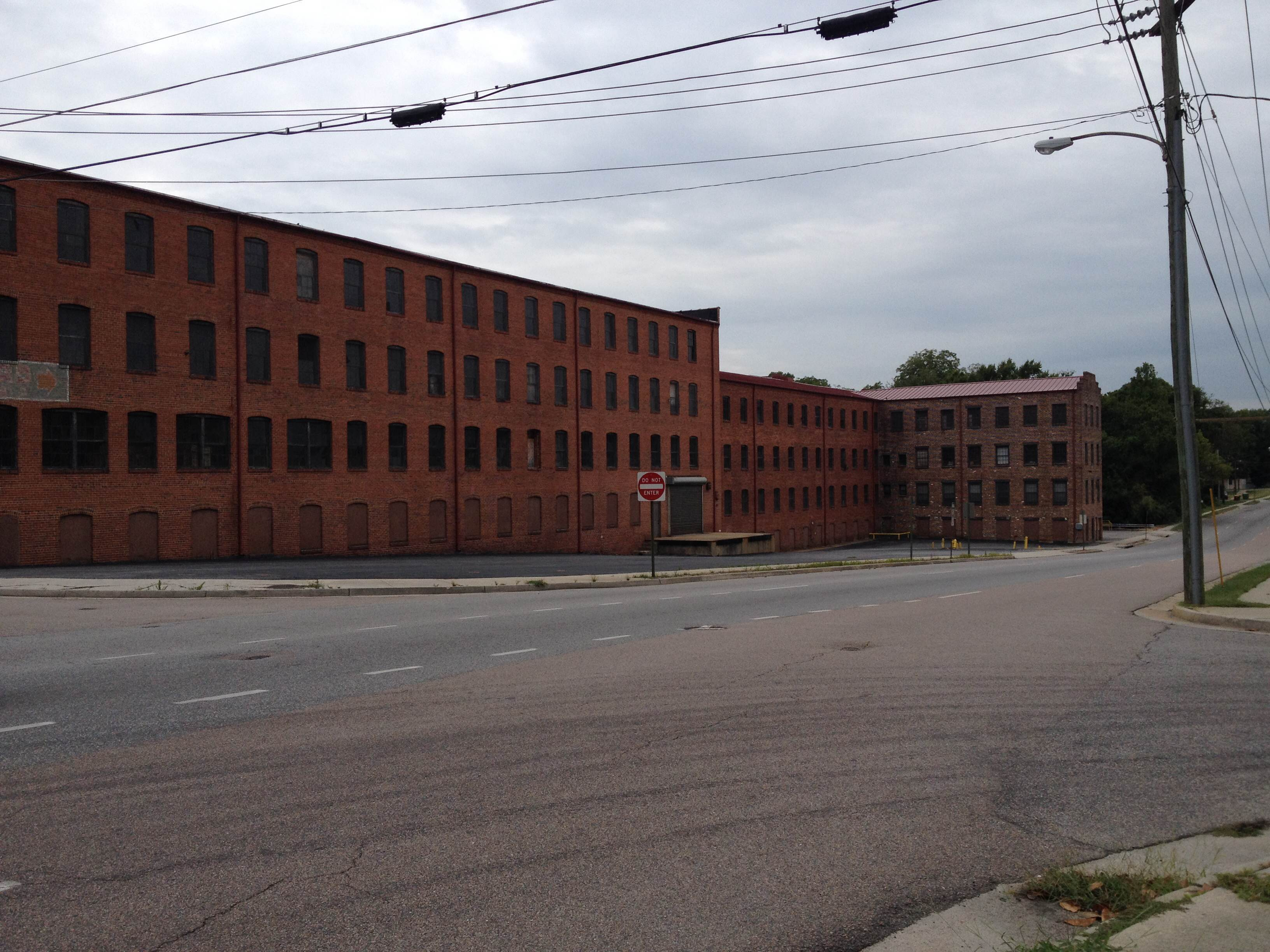

- Location within Virginia Location within the United States
- Location: 600 W. Wythe St., Petersburg, Virginia
- Coordinates: 37°13′26″N 77°24′40″W
- Area: 6.3 acres (2.5 ha)
- Built: 1903
- Architectural style: Late 19th And Early 20th Century American Movements
- NRHP reference No.: 09001157
- VLR No.: 123-5423

Significant dates
- Added to NRHP: December 23, 2009
- Designated VLR: September 17, 2009

Virginia Trunk & Bag Company is a historic factory complex located at Petersburg, Virginia. It was constructed in several phases between 1903 and about 1931. The two contributing buildings are the trunk factory building (1903) and storage and shipping building (1903). The two buildings are connected by two enclosed pedestrian bridges. The trunk factory is a four-story brick building with a number of additions. The storage and shipping building is a three- and four-story brick building. The railroad spur is a contributing site.

It was listed on the National Register of Historic Places in 2009.
