= Poplar Lawn Historic District =

Historic district in Virginia, United States

- U.S. National Register of Historic Places
- U.S. Historic district
- Virginia Landmarks Register
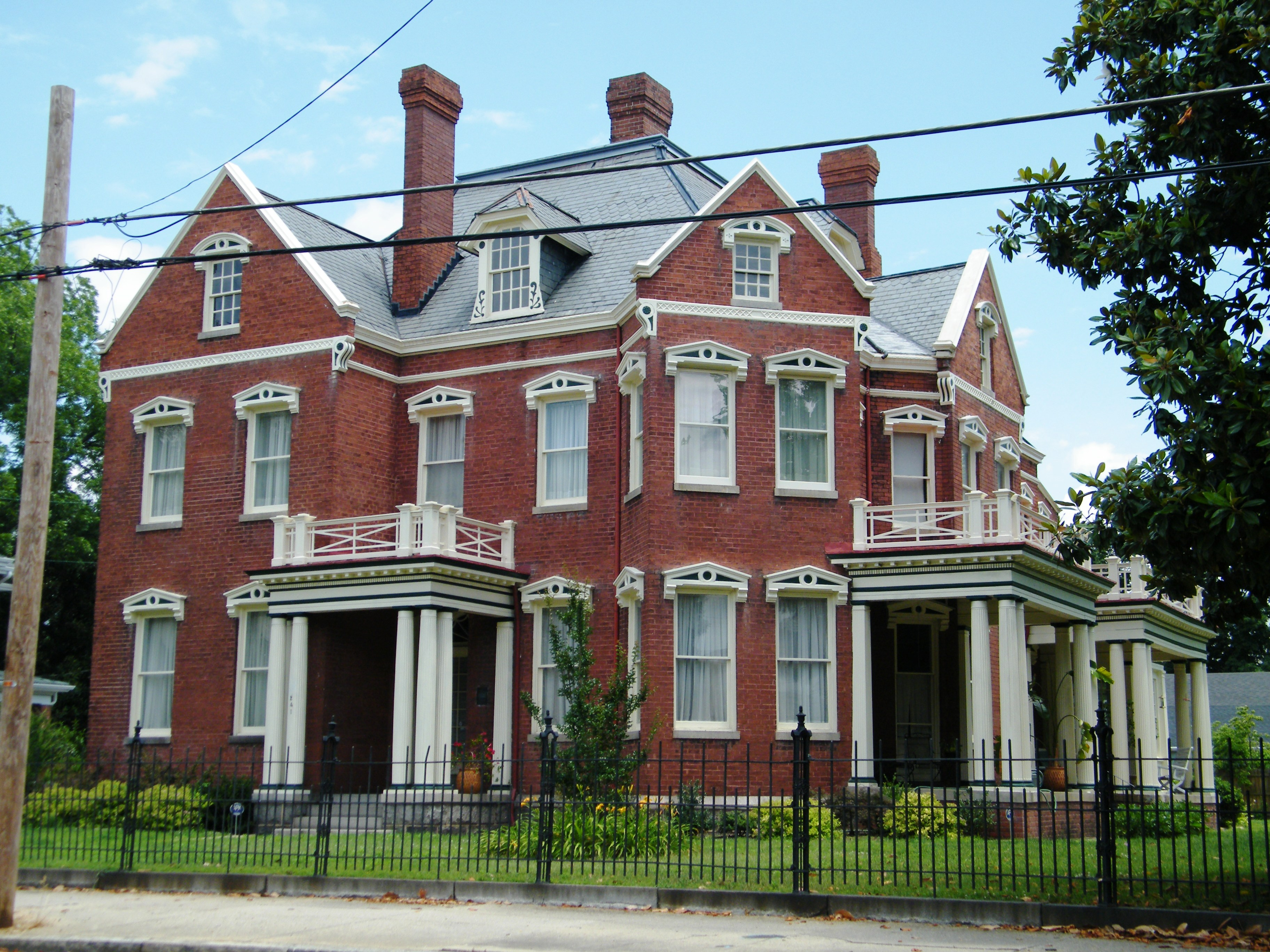
- Historic home in Poplar Lawn Historic District, June 2011

- Location within Virginia Location within the United States
- Location: Roughly bounded by Surrey Lane, St. Jefferson, Mars and Harrison Sts., Jct. of E Wythe and S. Jefferson, from SE of orig. HD to Lieutenant Run, Along both sides of Harrison St. at SW corner, Petersburg, Virginia
- Coordinates: 37°13′23″N 77°24′03″W
- Area: 199.2 acres (80.6 ha)
- Built: 1846
- Architect: Multiple
- Architectural style: Greek Revival, Colonial Revival, Second Empire, Italianate
- NRHP reference No.: 80004315, 06000030 (Boundary Increase)
- VLR No.: 123-0094

Significant dates
- Added to NRHP: May 23, 1980, February 10, 2006 (Boundary Increase)
- Designated VLR: February 26, 1979; December 7, 2005

Poplar Lawn Historic District is a national historic district located in Petersburg, Virginia. The district is named after Petersburg's central park, which spans about two city blocks. In the early 19th century, it was often used as a military parade ground, but during the American Civil War, it became a tent-based detention center and hospital. Later, it became the site of civic celebrations, including possibly the first Memorial Day, on June 9, 1865. The district also includes 372 contributing buildings, mostly mid- to late-19th-century, single-family residences for middle and upper-middle-class families, some constructed of brick, others weatherboard frame, and later subdivided. Residential architectural styles include Greek Revival, Colonial Revival, Second Empire, and Italianate. Notable buildings include the Bolling-Zimmer House (c. 1830), St. Stephen's Church (c. 1912), Zion Baptist Church (c. 1880s), William T. Double House (c. 1855), the Waterworks (1856), Dr. Robert Broadnax House (1858), Market Street Methodist Church Parsonage (c. 1905), Maurice Finn House (c. 1904), and the Frank M. D'Alton Double House (c. 1911).

Poplar Lawn Park features a stone basin of uncertain age that is five feet across, and with an oval-shaped depression a foot wide and a foot deep. It is traditionally known as "Pocahontas' bath", though there is no proof she ever used it.

It was listed on the National Register of Historic Places in 1980, with a boundary increase in 2006.
