= Cohen House (Petersburg, Virginia) =

Historic house in Virginia, United States

- U.S. National Register of Historic Places
- Virginia Landmarks Register
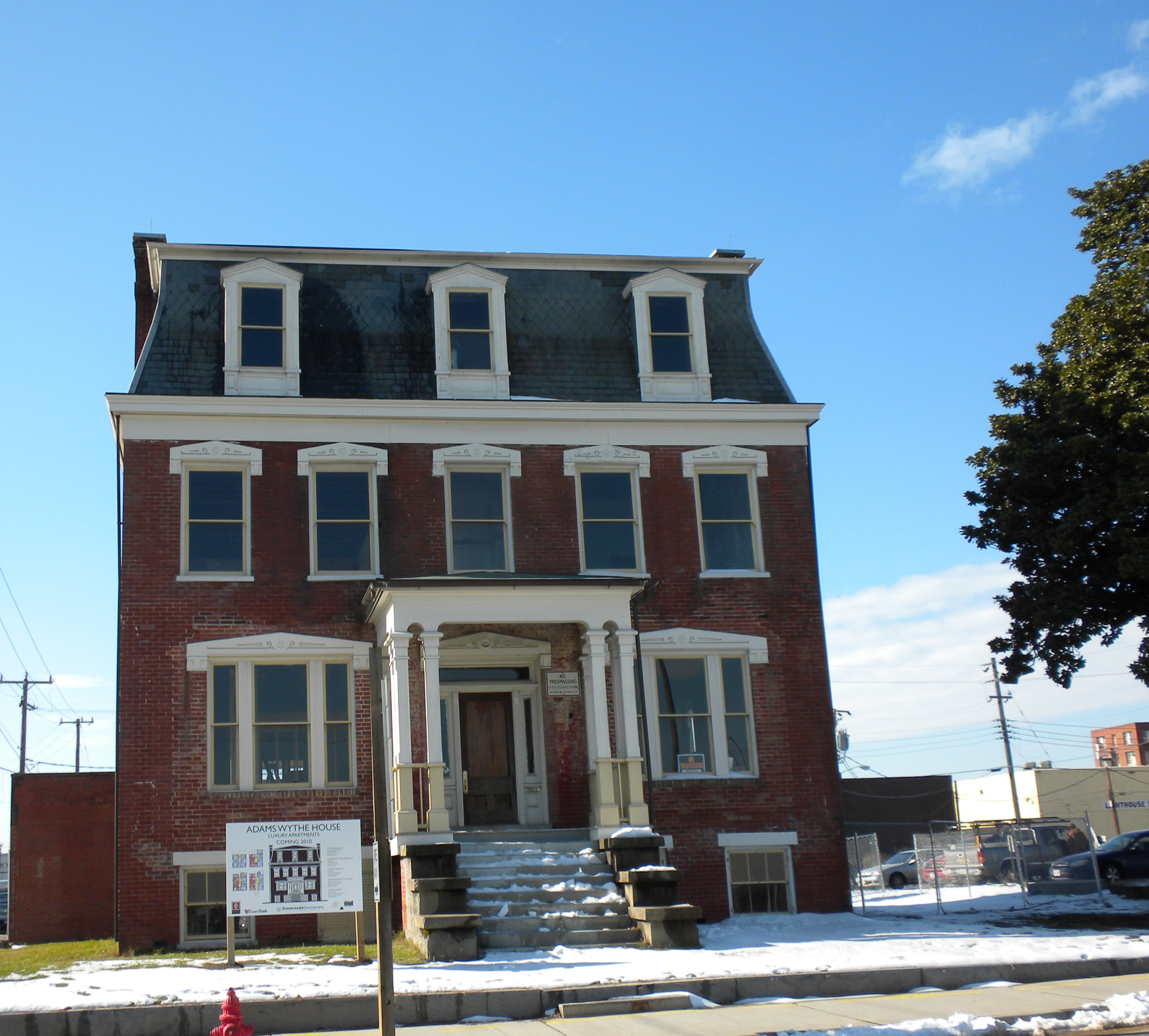
- Cohen House, December 2009

- Location within Virginia Location within the United States
- Location: 32 S. Adams St., Petersburg, Virginia
- Coordinates: 37°13′36″N 77°24′7″W
- Area: less than one acre
- Built: 1851, 1897-1898
- Architectural style: Second Empire
- NRHP reference No.: 07001141
- VLR No.: 123-0115

Significant dates
- Added to NRHP: November 1, 2007
- Designated VLR: September 5, 2007

Cohen House is a historic home located at Petersburg, Virginia. The original building was built in 1851. It has evolved into a three-story, three-bay, Second Empire style brick dwelling. It has a tall mansard roof with decorative slate shingles added during a major remodeling in 1897–1898.

It was listed on the National Register of Historic Places in 2007.
