= McIlwaine House =

Historic house in Virginia, United States

- U.S. National Register of Historic Places
- Virginia Landmarks Register
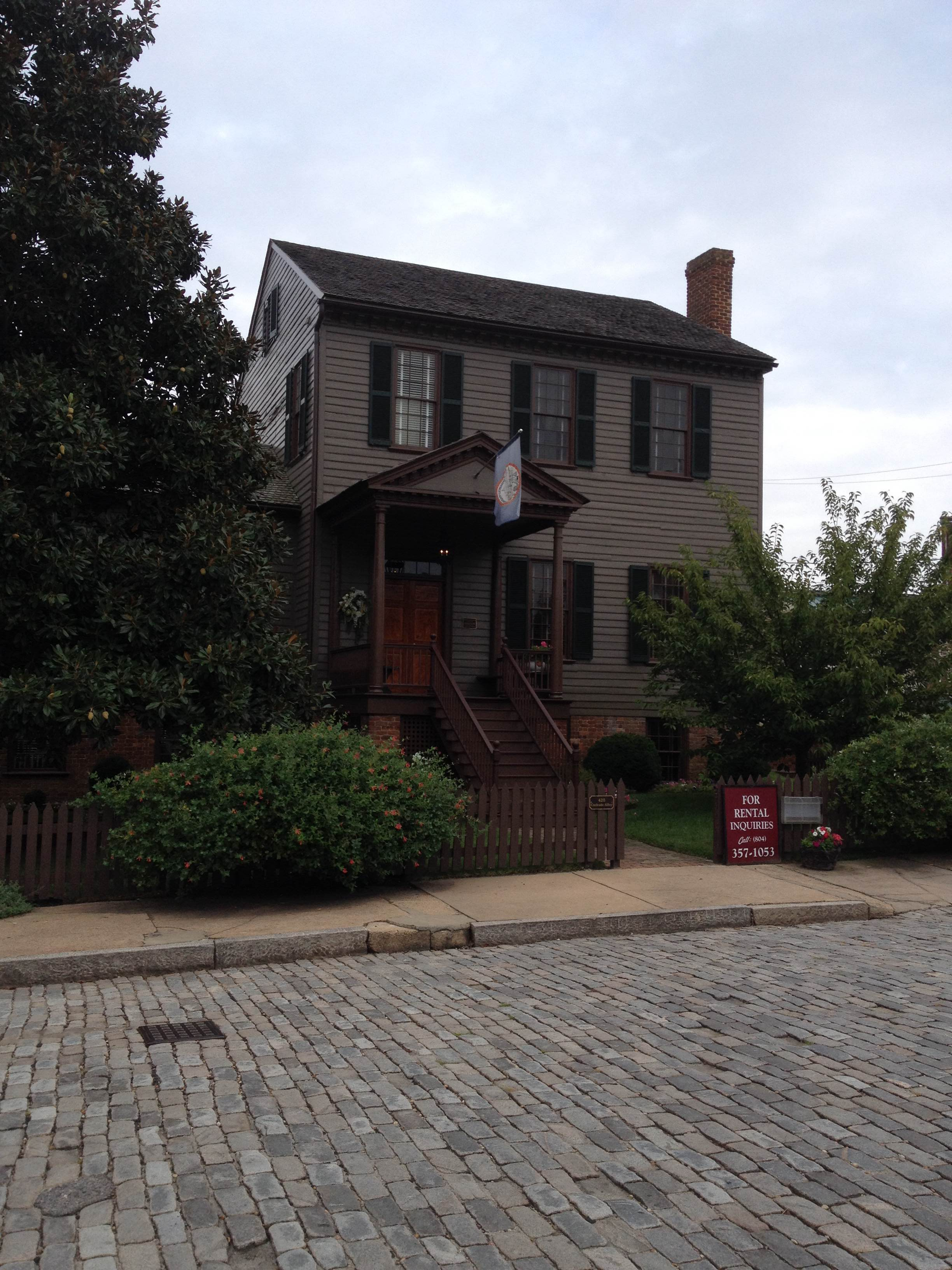

- Location within Virginia Location within the United States
- Location: Market Square at corner of Pelham and Cockade Alleys, Petersburg, Virginia
- Coordinates: 37°13′59″N 77°24′15″W
- Area: 9 acres (3.6 ha)
- Built: 1815
- Architectural style: Federal
- NRHP reference No.: 73002217
- VLR No.: 123-0011

Significant dates
- Added to NRHP: July 16, 1973
- Designated VLR: June 19, 1973

McIlwaine House, also known as the Jones-McIlwaine House, is a historic home located at Petersburg, Virginia. It was built in 1815, and is a 2 1/2-story, Federal style frame dwelling with a 1 1/2-story wing. It has a front porch with a modillioned cornice supported by Doric order columns. The house was moved eight blocks to its present location in 1972.

It was listed on the National Register of Historic Places in 1973.
