= Virginia Barrier Islands =

Barrier islands along the coast of Virginia, United States

Coordinates: 37°35′N 75°37′W

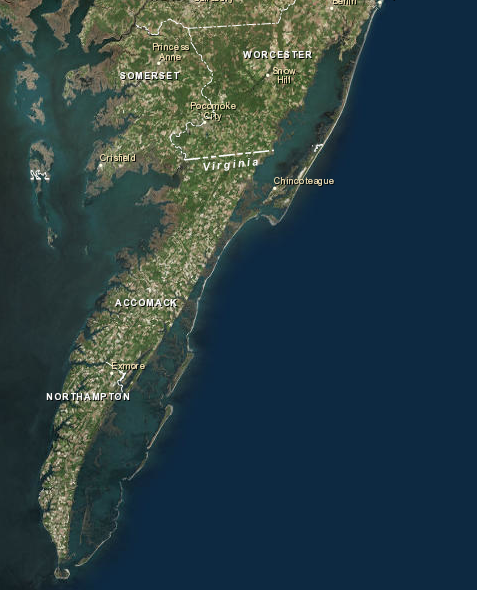
The Virginia Barrier Islands forming a line along the eastern coast of Delmarva.

The Virginia Barrier Islands are a continuous chain of long, narrow, low-lying barrier islands separated from one another by narrow inlets and from the mainland by a series of shallow marshy tidal bays along the entire coast of the Virginia end of the Delmarva Peninsula. Several of these islands were once significantly larger, covered with pine forests, and inhabited. After the completion of the New York, Philadelphia and Norfolk Railroad in the late 19th Century, at least five lavish hunting and fishing clubs were established on Virginia's barrier islands and they became a playground for wealthy sportsmen from Northeastern cities who would arrive by train. US President Grover Cleveland visited Hog Island to hunt waterfowl and go fishing in the early 1890s.

Devastating hurricanes that struck the Delmarva Peninsula in 1896 and again in 1933 caused significant shoreline erosion, and completely flooded the islands killing the pine forests and damaging or destroying many structures. Residents of the barrier islands began to leave for the mainland, in some cases taking their homes with them where they still stand today in the small towns of Willis Wharf and Oyster. The sole remaining habitation on these islands, the town of Broadwater, Virginia, was evacuated in 1936 following another hurricane. Because they are uninhabited they form an important ecological region, and several make up the Virginia Coast Reserve.

The Virginia Barrier Islands terminate to the south at the mouth of the Chesapeake Bay and are preceded to the north by Fenwick Island, a barrier spit, not a true island, spanning the Maryland and Delaware border (Transpeninsular Line). They are, in order from north to south:

- Assateague Island - the first true barrier island from the north and the longest of the barrier islands. It is divided between Maryland and Virginia and is home to a feral horse population, the Chincoteague Pony.
- Chincoteague Island- was a barrier island until the mid-19th Century, when Assateague migrated so far south that it shielded Chincoteague from the ocean. Thus, now it is technically a backbarrier island, like Rogue and Skidmore islands further south.
- Wallops Island - the base of NASA's Wallops Flight Facility.
- Assawoman Island - part of Chincoteague National Wildlife Refuge
- Metompkin Island -split between the Nature Conservancy and Chincoteague National Wildlife Refuge. Ironically, an inlet has now formed cutting the island physically in half, it is visible in satellite imagery. North Metompkin is very close to fusing with the mainland.
- Cedar Island - A former US Coast Guard station still stands on the island and is seasonally inhabited by its private owners. Despite the fact that the island was only accessible by boat, development began on Cedar Island in the 1970s and a number of lots were sold and approximately 35 summer cottages were built. Almost immediately these beach houses became threatened by shoreline erosion. The last private house on Cedar Island slipped into the sea in 2014.
- Parramore Island and Revel Island - owned by the Nature Conservancy. These "two" islands are now fused into one, though the label "Revel Island" persist on maps. Parramore is one of the few islands in the chain with still-present maritime forest.
- Hog Island - Location of the former town of Broadwater, Virginia, along with the Hog Island Light. Origin of the Hog Island Sheep, and the Hog Island Fig. The last permanent residents of Hog evacuated after an unnamed hurricane hit the island in August of 1933 and caused extensive damage, including killing the last of its once extensive maritime forest. To this day, a forest has not re-established on this island.
- Cobb Island - Once also inhabited with a resort hotel, church, and small town, until the 1896 hurricane. Coast Guard Station Cobb Island was decommissioned in 1964, later it was moved to the town of Oyster. The island is now split in two due to ocean overwash.
- Wreck Island
- Shipshoal Island
- Myrtle Island
- Smith Island - once held by the Custis family of Virginia. Martha Custis Washington owned the island, as did her great-granddaughter, whose husband Robert E. Lee gave an account of the island after inspecting it in 1832 while stationed at nearby Fort Monroe. It hosts the Cape Charles Lighthouse, the tallest lighthouse in Virginia and the second tallest in the United States. Smith Island is now owned by the Nature Conservancy.
- Fisherman Island- is the southernmost of the Virginia barrier islands. Located at the entrance to the Chesapeake Bay, the island is subject to great changes in its landscape due to waves and runoff. It first formed approximately 200 to 250 years ago. Fisherman Island National Wildlife Refuge is located within the United States Fish and Wildlife Service's Eastern Shore of Virginia National Wildlife Refuge, and is bisected by U.S. Highway 13 and the Chesapeake Bay Bridge Tunnel. The island is the habitat of migratory waterfowl, shorebirds, and nesting waterbirds.

== See also ==
- Barrier Islands
- Outer Banks
- Delmarva

== Notes ==
Preceded by Wallops Island	Beaches of Delmarva	Succeeded by Southernmost point
