= Coast Guard Station Cobb Island =

Former US Coast Guard Station in Virginia

Coordinates: 37.290103°N 75.922164°W

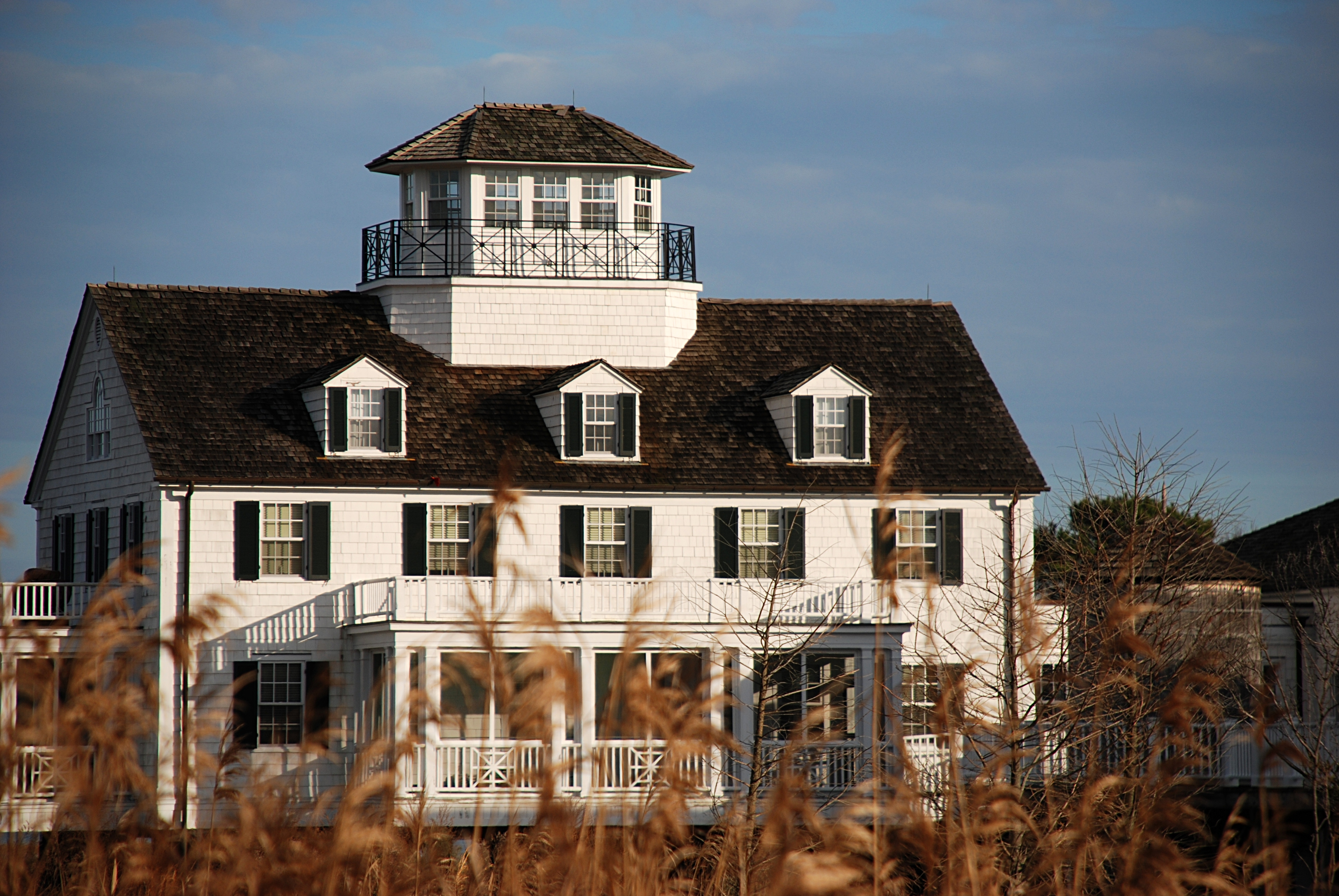
Cobb Island Station

Coast Guard Station Cobb Island (a.k.a. Cobb Station) is a former United States Coast Guard Station that was built on the southern end of Cobb Island, Virginia, one of Virginia's Barrier Islands, on Virginia's Eastern Shore, in 1936, to replace an earlier c. 1877 Coast Guard Station that had been damaged by a hurricane. The Coast Guard decommissioned Station Cobb Island in 1964. The Nature Conservancy (TNC) acquired the abandoned former Station Cobb Island in 1973. TNC moved the buildings comprising the former Station Cobb Island, by barge, eight miles across Cobb Island Bay, to a newly prepared site in Oyster, Northampton County, Virginia, on Virginia's Eastern Shore, in May 1998. TNC subsequently restored the former Station Cobb Island as a nature education center/lodge/conference center through adaptive reuse. The property is currently listed for sale.

== History ==
=== United States Coast Guard (c.1875/1936–1964) ===
Nathan F. Cobb Sr. of Eastham, Massachusetts, came to Northampton County, Virginia. in October 1837, where he opened a store on the seaside road. In 1839 he purchased Sand Shoals Island, an uninhabited barrier island south of the Great Machipongo Inlet now known as Cobb Island, from a local fisherman known as "Hard-Time" Fitchett for a $100 cash down payment and a two-horse wagon-load of salt to be delivered later. Cobb had a large home framed-up on Cape Cod and brought down to the barrier island by ship where he erected it and immediately opened his island as a public resort. Eventually, Cobb constructed a hotel that catered to wealthy sportsmen from the northeast who traveled to the barrier island to hunt waterfowl and fish, and built a small town with a number of summer cottages and a church. In addition to running the hotel Cobb and his sons Nathan Jr., Warren and Albert made a living market hunting and salvaging the many wrecked ships that stranded off Cobb Island.

The Cobbs were known for saving the lives of many shipwrecked sailors, therefore in 1875, the United States Life-Saving Service commissioned a lifesaving station on Cobb's Island. Only a couple of years after it was completed the station caught fire and burned to the ground and a second station was built to replace it. Coast Guard Station Cobb Island was built by the United States Coast Guard on the southern end of Cobb Island in 1936 to replace the second c.1877 station that was damaged by the storm surge from the 1933 Chesapeake–Potomac hurricane that swept across the low lying barrier island.

By the 1930s Coast Guardsmen manning Station Cobb Island were the only permanent residents of Cobb Island. The Cobbs and all other residents had moved to the mainland more than three decades earlier after the 1896 Hurricane destroyed the hotel and much of the town. The architecture style of the new station was Colonial Revival, as designed by the Coast Guard's Civil Engineer's office. During its 89-year existence Coast Guard Station Cobb Island responded to twenty-four major shipwrecks. Station Cobb Island was decommissioned by the Coast Guard in 1964 and abandoned leaving Cobb Island uninhabited.

=== The Nature Conservancy (TNC) (1973–2006) ===
The Nature Conservancy (TNC) acquired the former Station Cobb Island from the U.S. Government in 1973., included as part of TNC's Virginia Coast Reserve (VCR). By the 1990s the former Coast Guard station was threatened by shoreline erosion and TNC made the decision to move the historic building from Cobb Island to the mainland to save it from destruction. In early May 1998, Expert Construction and House Movers, a Virginia Beach, Virginia, based commercial company contracted by TNC, lifted the three-story former Coast Guard station building onto a barge. On May 6, 1998, they towed the barge eight miles across Cobb Island Bay to a newly prepared site in Oyster, Northampton County, Virginia, on Virginia's Eastern Shore. On May 7, 1998, the building was unloaded from the barge and moved on land to a newly prepared site. An associated boathouse had also been moved by barge to the newly prepared new site at an earlier date. TNC subsequently restored the former Station Cobb Island as a nature education center/lodge/conference center. A Keeper's cottage and other secondary buildings were subsequently added to complement the original Station.

=== World Healing Institute (2006 – c. 2011) ===
The former Station Cobb Island was acquired by Cobb Island Station LLC from The Nature Conservancy, c. 2006. The property was leased as a retreat center by the World Healing Institute until 2011.

=== Property for sale (2018) ===
The property, including the restored buildings and structures comprising the former Station Cobb Island, is currently (2018) listed for sale. The property is 32.3 acres. Included are: 17 acres of tidal salt marsh, 4 acres of intertidal emergent and scrub/shrub wetlands, and 5 acres of high ground and forest.

=== Kagawa, Ron M. and J. Richard Kellam. Cobb's Island, Virginia: The Last Sentinel. Virginia Beach, Virginia: The Donning Company Publishers, 2003 ===
This publication examines the history of Cobb's Island, Virginia. Chapter 3: "Transformations: The Cobb's Island Life-Saving Stations", pp. 27–119, details the history of Cobb Island's two life-saving stations. This includes the planning for the move of the 1936 Coast Guard Station to the mainland, the move in May 1998, and the subsequent restoration of the former Coast Guard Station's buildings.

"…As part of Shore Financial Corporation's ongoing commitment to the Eastern Shore, we are proud to sponsor the effort to preserve the history, heritage, and traditions of our community. We are pleased that the proceeds of this book will benefit the Eastern Shore of Virginia Chamber of Commerce…"
