= Broadwater, Virginia =

Unincorporated community in Virginia, US

Coordinates: 37°23′34″N 75°42′31″W

Broadwater is a former town and unincorporated community located on Hog Island, one of the Virginia Barrier Islands, in Northampton County, Virginia, United States. The town is the place of origin of the Hog Island Sheep. After several hurricanes that caused severe shoreline erosion, the town was abandoned in the 1930s and many of the houses and other buildings were loaded onto barges and moved to the mainland, where they still stand in Willis Wharf, and Oyster.
