= 1896 Atlantic hurricane season =

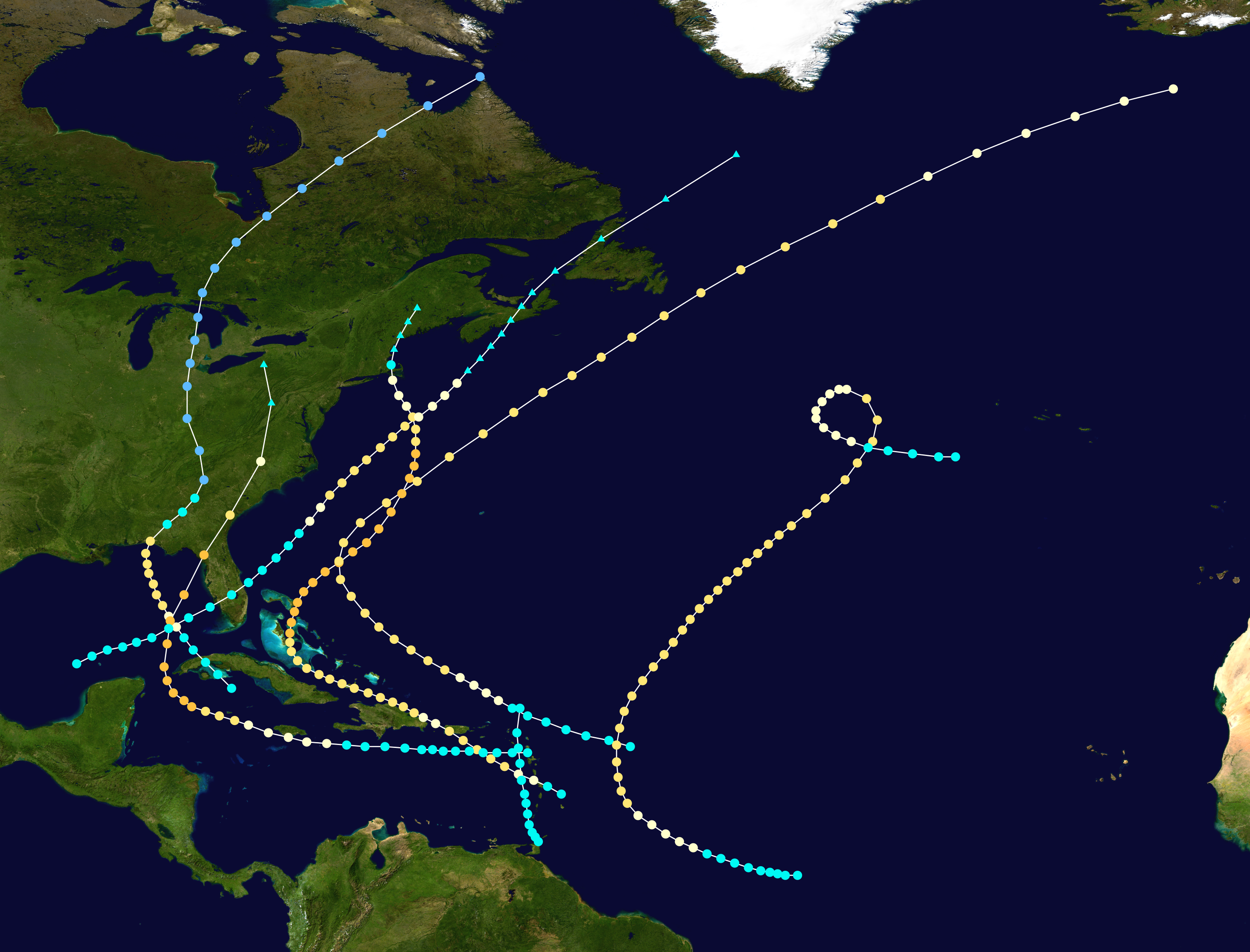
- Season summary map

Seasonal boundaries
- First system formed: July 4, 1896
- Last system dissipated: November 29, 1896

Strongest storm
- By maximum sustained winds: Four
  - Maximum winds: 125 mph (205 km/h) (1-minute sustained)
  - Lowest pressure: 960 mbar (hPa; 28.35 inHg)
- By central pressure: Two
  - Maximum winds: 115 mph (185 km/h) (1-minute sustained)
  - Lowest pressure: 956 mbar (hPa; 28.23 inHg)

Seasonal statistics
- Total storms: 7
- Hurricanes: 6
- Major hurricanes (Cat. 3+): 2
- Total fatalities: 286
- Total damage: $10 million (1896 USD)

Related article
- 1890s North Indian Ocean cyclone seasons

The 1896 Atlantic hurricane season was fairly inactive but produced one of the costliest hurricanes ever to strike the United States until that point, along with several other destructive tropical cyclones. The season began in early July with a hurricane in the Gulf of Mexico and ended in late November with a slow-moving tropical storm over the Lesser Antilles. Of the season's seven documented systems, six are believed to have become hurricanes, and two intensified into major hurricanes—the equivalence of Category 3 or greater on the modern-day Saffir–Simpson scale. All but one of the systems directly affected land to some degree; Hurricane "Six" remained over open water and only posed a threat to shipping lanes. In addition, a possible storm was identified off the coast of North Carolina on August 28–29, but modern reanalysis efforts have found insufficient evidence to classify it as a tropical cyclone. Tropical systems in the 1896 season killed at least 286 people and inflicted more than $10 million (1896 USD) in damage.

The first hurricane made landfall in the Florida Panhandle on July 7, causing wind damage and coastal flooding in Pensacola, and destroying boats at port. No activity was observed until late August when a hurricane triggered widespread river flooding in Puerto Rico. After moving north, this storm struck eastern New England. Hurricane "Three" avoided land, but its outer periphery generated gusty winds in the Outer Banks of North Carolina. On September 29, fast-moving Hurricane "Four" became one of the costliest United States hurricanes on record at the time after swamping Florida's Cedar Keys with a large storm surge and subsequently causing extensive devastation in the eastern United States. The hurricane caused 202 deaths and more than $9 million in damage across eight states, plus Washington, D.C., and the Great Lakes. About two weeks later, Hurricane "Five" roughly paralleled the U.S. East Coast, causing substantial coastal flooding and destruction of beachfront property. Little is known about the season's sixth hurricane which never affected land. Torrential rainfall associated with the final tropical storm of the season triggered deadly flooding on Montserrat, where nearly 50 people drowned and many more lost their homes.

== Systems ==
=== Hurricane One ===
- Category 2 hurricane (SSHWS)
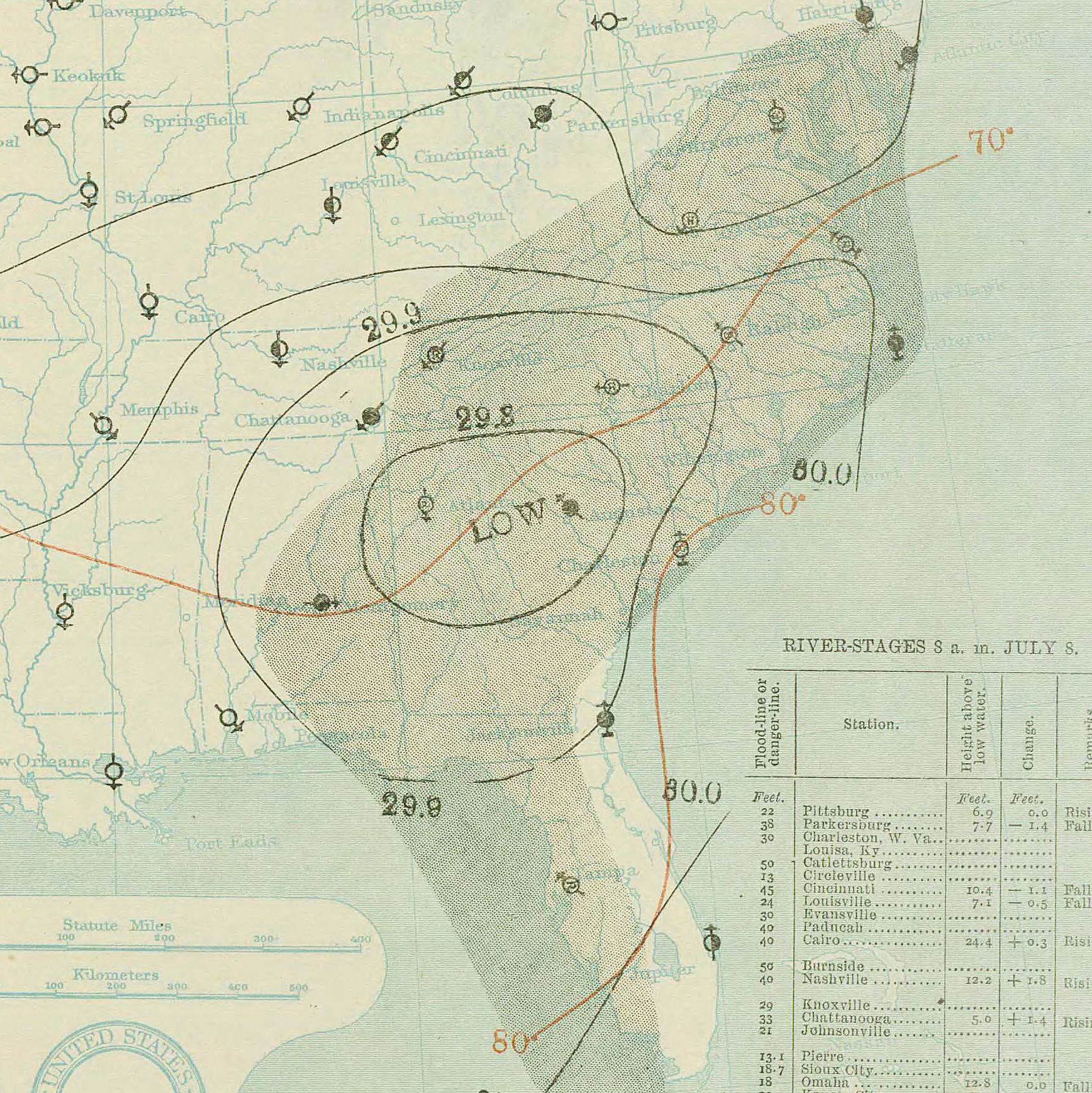
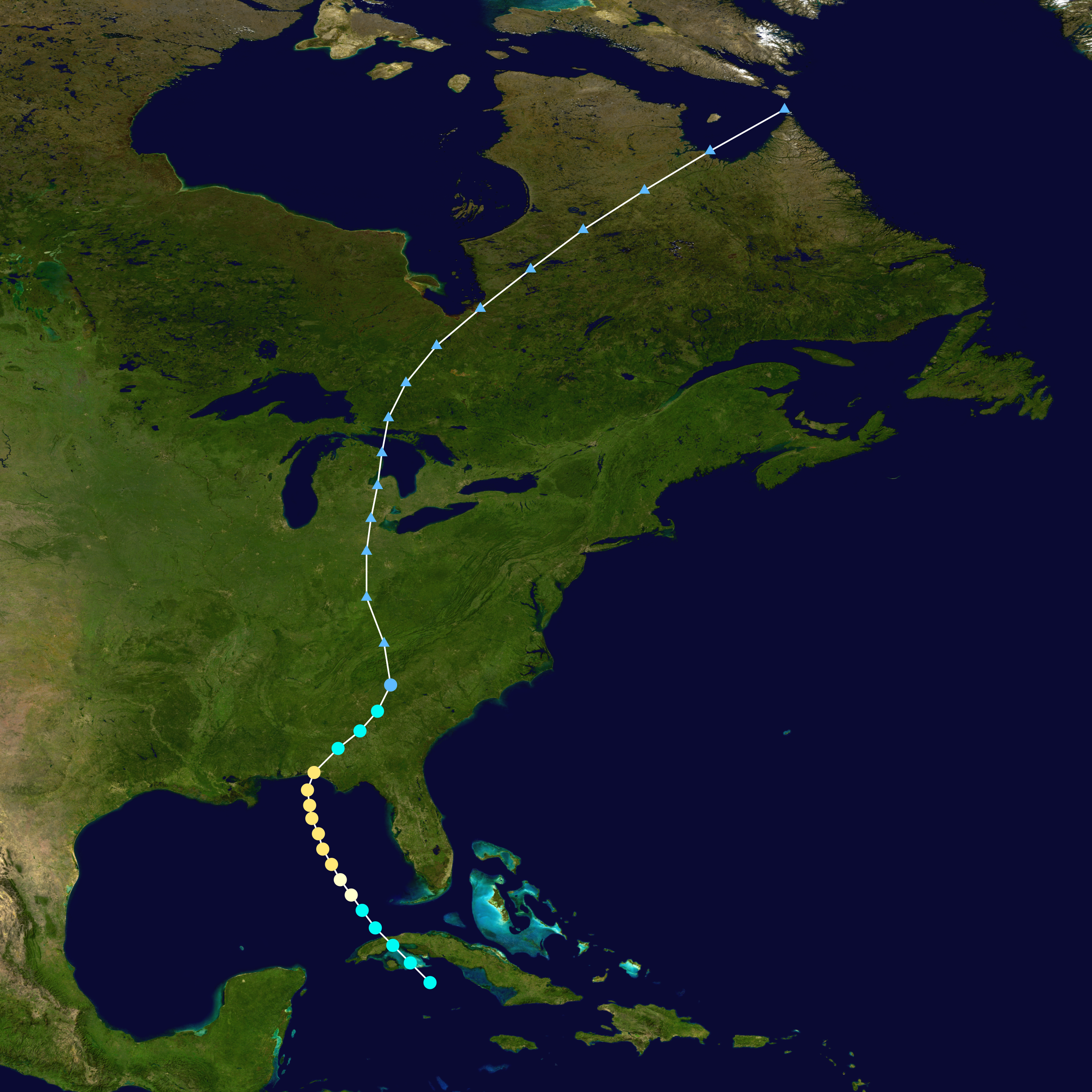
- Duration: July 4 – July 9
- Peak intensity: 100 mph (155 km/h) (1-min);

The first documented tropical cyclone of the 1896 season has unclear origins. Although its official track in the National Hurricane Center's Atlantic hurricane database shows a northwestward path over Cuba, contemporary United States Weather Bureau maps indicated formation in the western Gulf of Mexico, and news reports discussed an eastward motion of the storm. Additionally, no severe weather was observed in Cuba during the month of July. In any event, the storm likely intensified into a hurricane on July 5, and around midday on July 7, it made landfall on the Florida Panhandle east of Pensacola, at Category 2 intensity. Upon moving ashore, the hurricane produced powerful winds as high as 100 mph (160 km/h). The storm rapidly weakened as it moved inland, and after tracking north for five days, its remnants dissipated near Baffin Bay on July 12.

Widespread damage was reported in Pensacola and along the coast, with watercraft suffering the greatest losses. In the city's harbor, the storm sank nine fishing boats, damaged two barques and a brig, and wrecked numerous smaller vessels. The winds damaged chimneys, signs, awnings, overhead wires, and some buildings throughout the city. About 35 house were unroofed, along with several stores, a hotel, and a church. Fallen trees rendered streets impassable, and railroads near the shore were washed out. Total damage in the city was estimated at $100,000. As the storm moved inland, gusty winds and heavy rainfall extended into parts of Alabama, Georgia, the Carolinas, and southern Virginia. Precipitation peaked at 12.0 inches (300 mm) in Greenwood, South Carolina. On the morning of July 8, rainbands on the storm's eastern side spawned a tornado in Halifax County, North Carolina, that killed one person and destroyed several houses. Several more tornadoes developed in Virginia later in the day, causing five injuries and scattered damage.

=== Hurricane Two ===
- Category 3 hurricane (SSHWS)
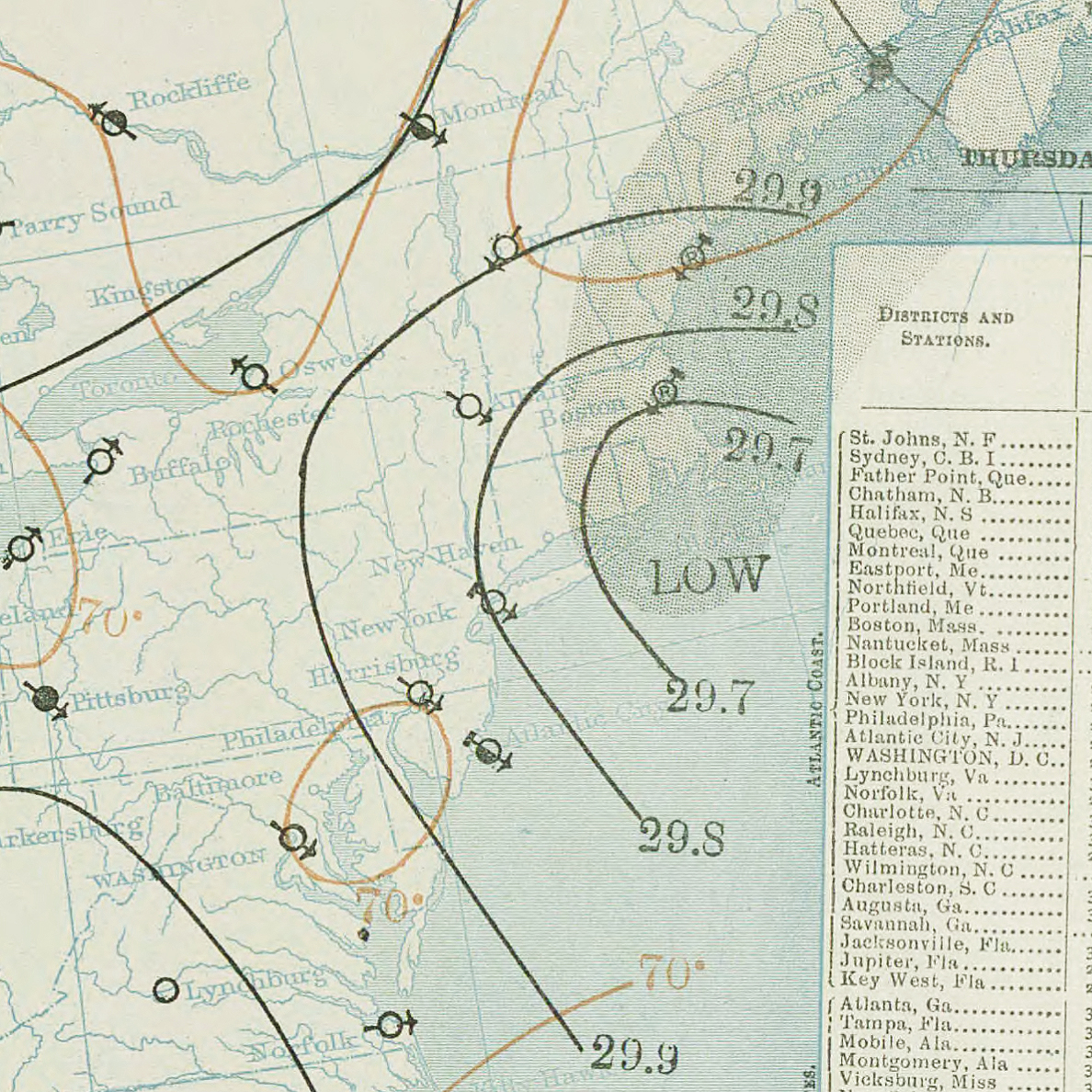
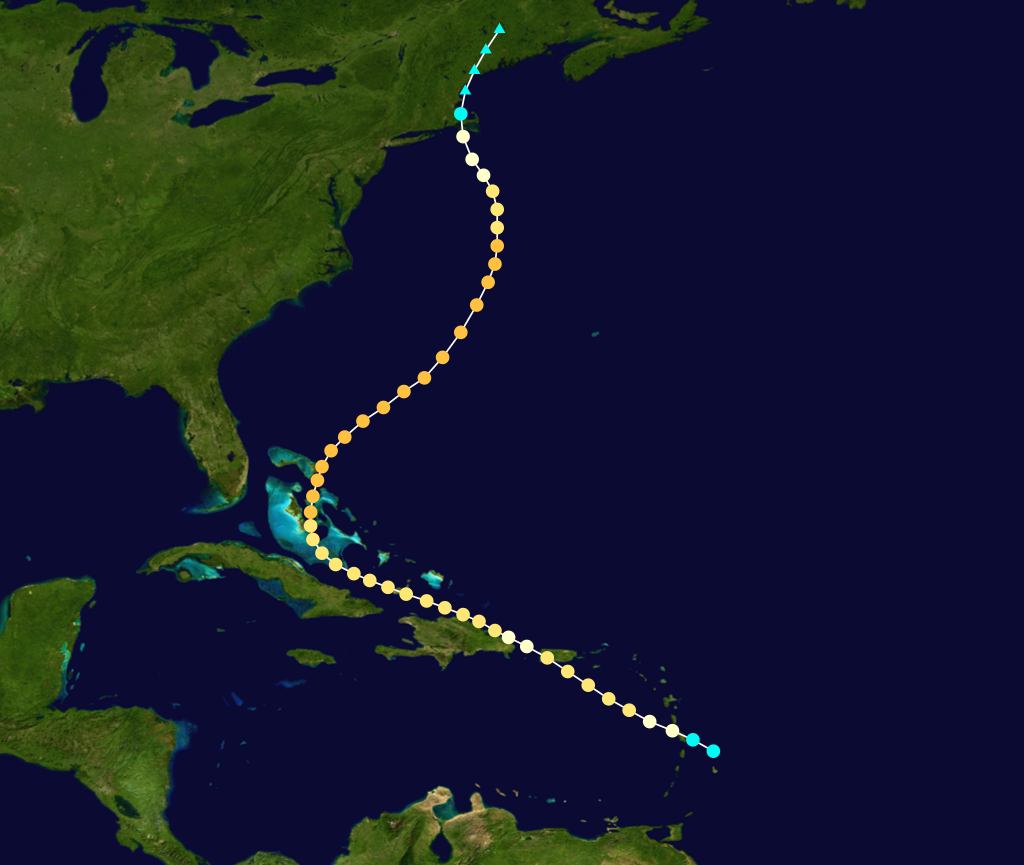
- Duration: August 30 – September 10
- Peak intensity: 115 mph (185 km/h) (1-min); 956 mbar (hPa)

Hurricane San Ramón of 1896

On August 30, a tropical storm materialized east of the Lesser Antilles, on a northwestward course. The next night, it made landfall on the southern coast of Puerto Rico as a Category 2 hurricane, accompanied by severe rain and wind. The storm passed just north of Hispaniola and Cuba over the next several days, delivering tropical storm-force winds to the islands. On the evening of September 6, while near the Bahamas, a steamship crossed the center of the hurricane and recorded a barometric pressure of 28.24 inHg (956 mbar). This corresponds to maximum sustained winds of 115 mph (185 km/h), or a Category 3 major hurricane, which represents storm's peak intensity. The ship suffered extensive damage and lost one crew member when he fell overboard. Tracking generally northward, the storm weakened to minimal hurricane intensity before making landfall over eastern Massachusetts on September 10, with 80 mph (130 km/h) maximum sustained winds extending to a radius of 35 mi (55 km) from the center. Sustained hurricane-force winds were observed in both Rhode Island and Massachusetts as the storm moved ashore. The system transitioned into an extratropical cyclone shortly thereafter.

Several rivers in Puerto Rico overflowed, leading to extensive flooding. Five homes were destroyed along the coast of Juana Díaz, and strong winds caused isolated Fujita-scale F1 damage. Later, the storm generated damaging winds along the Northeastern United States coast from New Jersey to eastern New England, wreaking havoc on beachfront property and small craft. High storm tides inundated streets, wharves, and cellars along the coast, while farther inland, high winds damaged crops and stripped orchards of their fruit. Wind gusts reached 80 mph (130 km/h) at Point Judith, Rhode Island, where five vessels were destroyed, and 75 mph (121 km/h) on Block Island. In Providence, the storm brought down communications wires and lodged numerous yachts against the coast. To the north, four sloops sank in Dorchester Bay. In Boston, the storm caused minor wind damage, mostly limited to chimneys, fences, and signs. On September 14, a stricken Italian barque called the Monte Tabor grounded out on a sandbar off Cape Cod after encountering the hurricane several days earlier. Seven of the ship's crew members made it safely to shore, but inexplicably, three others—including the captain—committed suicide upon running aground.

=== Hurricane Three ===
- Category 2 hurricane (SSHWS)
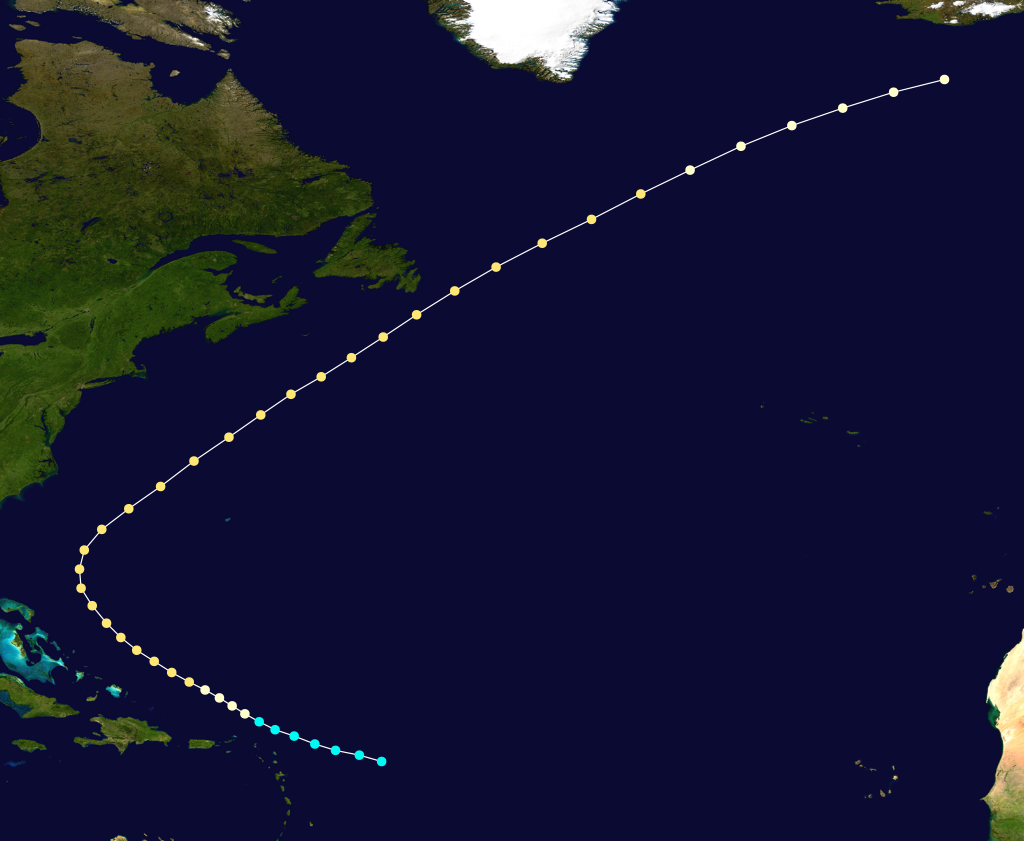
- Duration: September 18 – September 28
- Peak intensity: 100 mph (155 km/h) (1-min);

An unusually large storm formed east of the Lesser Antilles by September 18. It tracked northwestward, and on September 22, falling air pressure was observed at Havana, Cuba, some 500 mi (800 km) southwest of the storm's center. Several ships encountered the hurricane in the Gulf Stream on September 23, with one of them suffering damage to her sails. The hurricane recurved to the northeast far from the East Coast of the United States, but still produced northeasterly wind gusts as high as 58 mph (93 km/h) at Kitty Hawk, North Carolina, and 51 mph (82 km/h) at Cape Hatteras, roughly 300 mi (480 km) northwest of the hurricane. Although its intensity and path are not certain, the Atlantic hurricane database tracks the storm until dissipation south of Iceland on September 28.

=== Hurricane Four ===
- Category 3 hurricane (SSHWS)
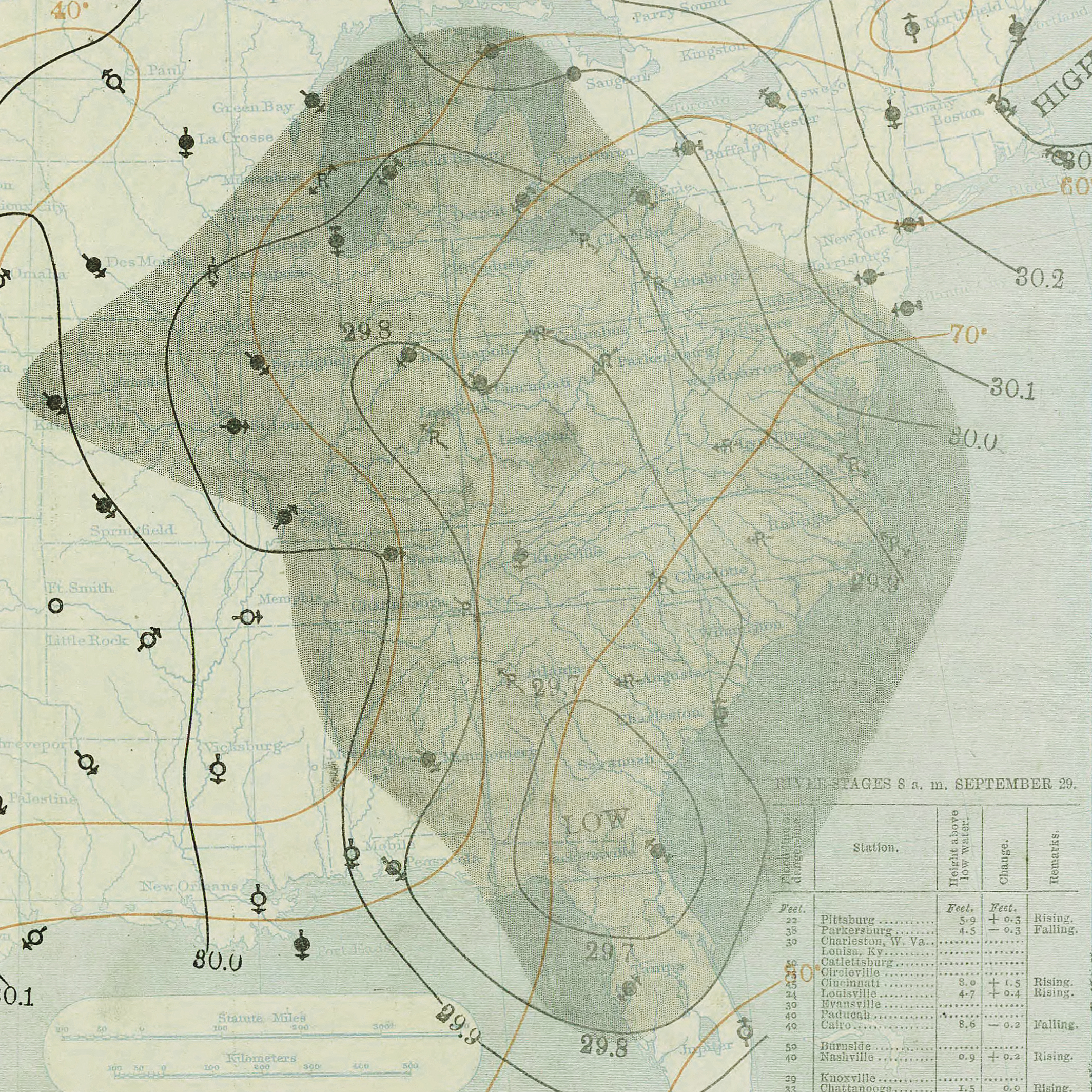
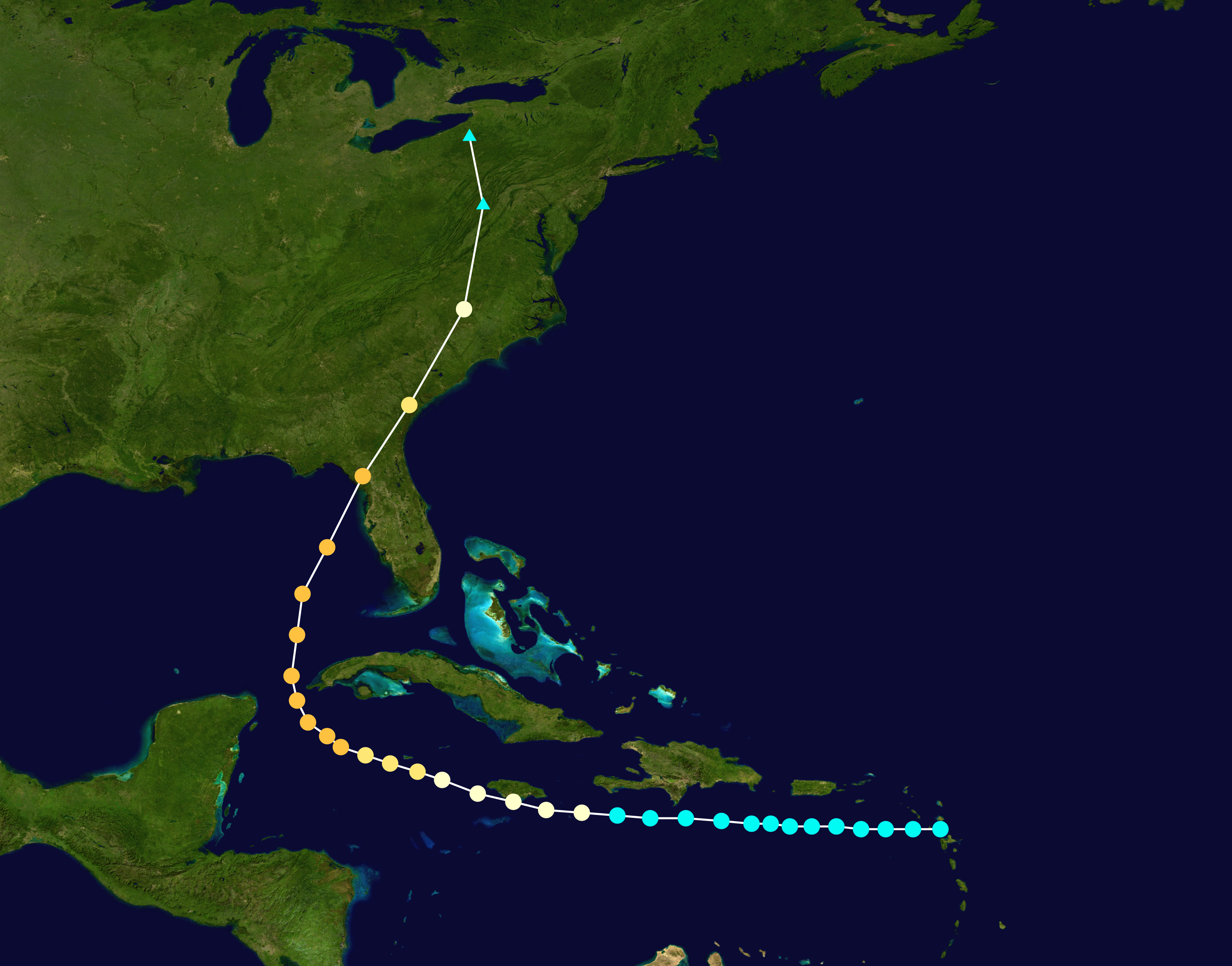
- Duration: September 22 – September 30
- Peak intensity: 125 mph (205 km/h) (1-min); 960 mbar (hPa)

The Cedar Keys Hurricane of 1896

The most destructive tropical cyclone of the season, and one of the costliest hurricanes ever to strike the United States at the time, passed through the Leeward Islands as a tropical storm on September 22, and moved westward Through Caribbean Sea south of Hisponiola and Jamaica. Intensifying into a Category 3 major hurricane, the storm moved through the Yucatán Channel on September 28, then accelerated toward the north-northeast. In the early morning on September 29, the hurricane struck Florida's Cedar Keys and moved inland across Levy County. The small but intense hurricane sped northward through northern Florida and southern Georgia; its rapid movement allowed it to maintain much of its severity over land. Extremely high winds accompanied the hurricane to the east of its track through the Mid-Atlantic states, and a band of heavy rain fell to its west from northern North Carolina to southern Pennsylvania. While becoming extratropical, the storm struck Washington, D.C., late on September 29, and after crossing central Pennsylvania, it dissipated near the Southern Tier of New York. Its remnants merged with another low pressure area over the Great Lakes.

The Cedar Keys were struck by a devastating 10.5 ft (3.2 m) storm surge that undermined buildings, washed out the connecting railroad to the mainland, and fully submerged the smaller, outlying islands where 31 people were killed. Strong winds destroyed many of the red cedar trees that played an important role in the economy of the region, and several cedar mills were severely damaged or destroyed. In interior Florida, the hurricane devastated many communities, leaving thousands of people homeless. Few homes or businesses were left standing in the hardest-hit areas. In northern Florida and southern Georgia, the hurricane razed millions of acres of pine forests, which crippled the local turpentine industry. In Savannah, Georgia, a 45-minute onslaught of fierce winds unroofed thousands of structures and left parks in a state of disarray. Damage to shipping and shoreline settlements in the Sea Islands was extensive.

As the hurricane continued northward, cities and agricultural districts alike suffered extensive damage in Virginia. Flash flooding in the Shenandoah Valley culminated in the failure of an earthen dam upstream from Staunton, unleashing a torrent of water that swept homes from their foundations and ravaged the town's business district. In Washington, D.C., thousands of trees were uprooted or snapped, communications were severed, and localized streaks of violent gusts damaged many public and private buildings. Many trees, some of historical significance, were blown down on the White House grounds. In Pennsylvania, flooding rains and powerful wind gusts produced widespread destruction, washing out railroads in western areas while demolishing hundreds of barns in and around Lancaster County. The storm demolished a 5,390 ft (1,640 m) bridge over the Susquehanna River, while the Gettysburg Battlefield lost hundreds of trees, a few of which landed on historical monuments. Damaging winds brought down trees and powerlines throughout the Northeastern United States, and the hurricane's extratropical remnants wrought havoc on shipping in the Great Lakes. Along the storm's path, it caused at least 202 deaths, and wrought more than $9.6 million in damage.

=== Hurricane Five ===
- Category 2 hurricane (SSHWS)
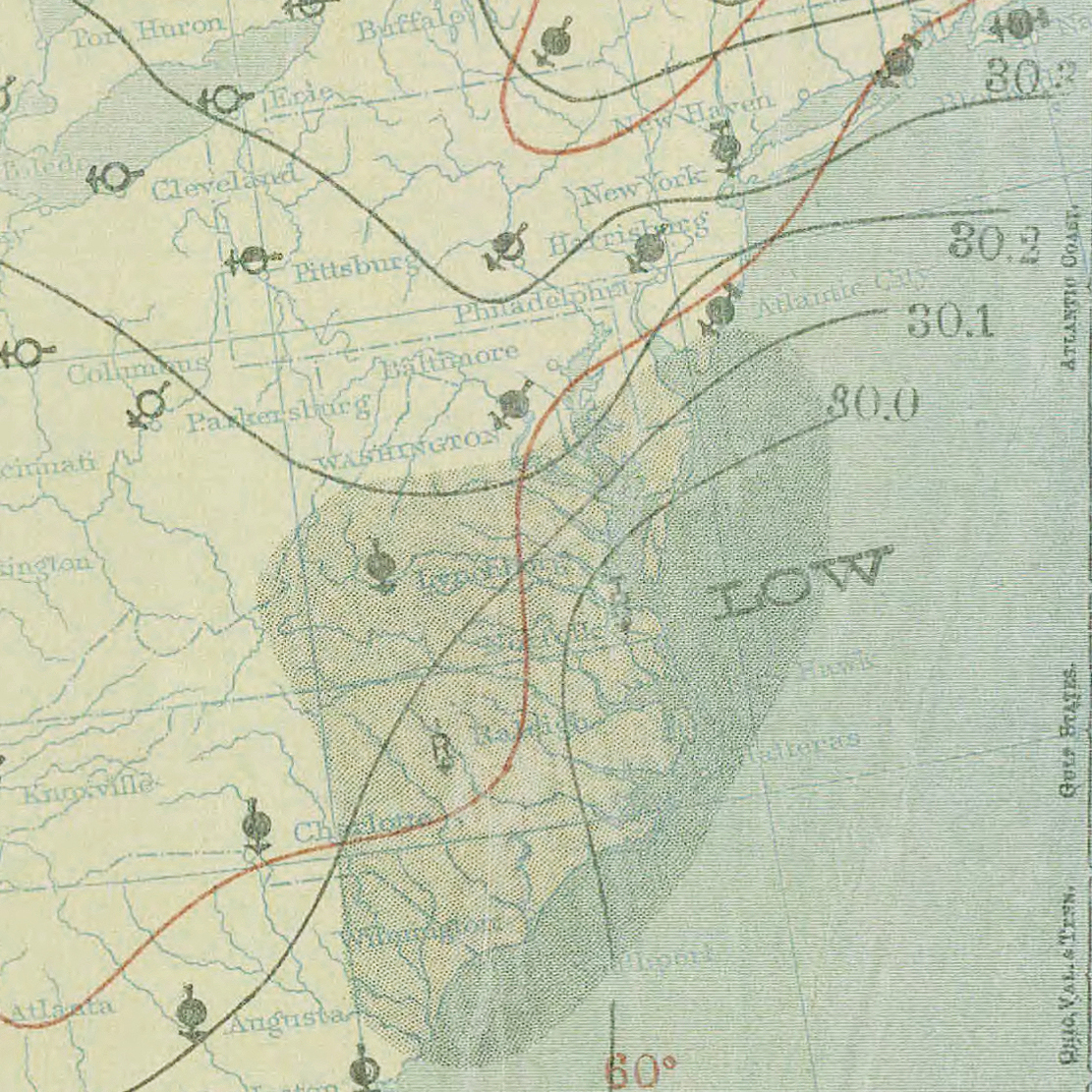
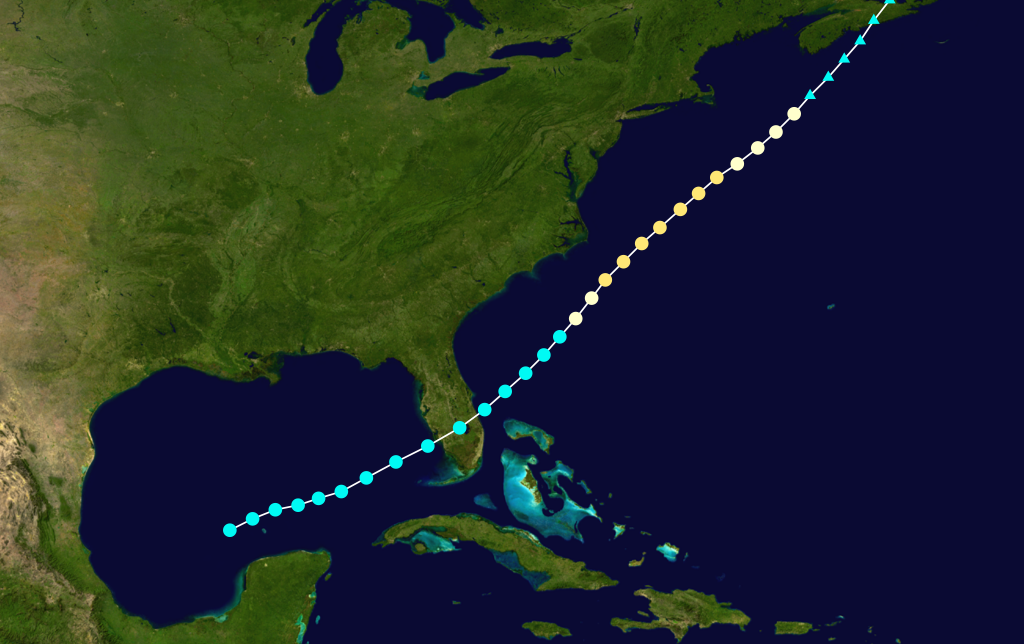
- Duration: October 7 – October 13
- Peak intensity: 100 mph (155 km/h) (1-min);

The East Coast Hurricane of 1896

This cyclone was first noted in the southern Gulf of Mexico as a weak tropical storm on October 7. It tracked toward the east-northeast and made landfall in a sparsely populated region of Southwest Florida around 00:02 UTC on October 9. After crossing the Florida Peninsula, it turned more northeastward and gradually intensified. The unusually slow-moving hurricane attained its peak intensity early on October 11, with estimated maximum sustained winds of 100 mph (155 km/h). Shortly thereafter, it made its closest approach to Cape Hatteras, North Carolina, passing roughly 115 mi (185 km) to the southeast. For several days, the hurricane brushed the coast from Virginia to southern New England with hurricane-force wind gusts. The storm became extratropical by 00:00 UTC on October 14, and struck the coast of central Nova Scotia before dissipating on October 16.

The storm had generally minor effects in Florida, mostly limited to coastal flooding in northeastern portions of the state. The Mid-Atlantic coastline experienced flooding storm tides that inundated and greatly eroded Cobb's Island, part of the Virginia Barrier Islands. Hotels and cottages there were extensively damaged. The storm claimed about 50 acres (20 ha) of Cobb's Island, reducing its size by two-thirds; subsequently, the inhabitants abandoned the island and its use as a resort ended. Along the Jersey Shore, low-lying railroads were flooded, boardwalks were destroyed, and many beach houses sustained damage. The hurricane did $200,000 in damage to coastal installations on New York's Coney Island. To the north, wind gusts as high as 80 mph (130 km/h) affected eastern New England, where shipping interests were heavily impacted by the storm. Three sailors died when a schooner went aground along the coast of Delaware, and another was tossed overboard while battling rough seas offshore. Overall damage amounted to $500,000.

=== Hurricane Six ===
- Category 2 hurricane (SSHWS)
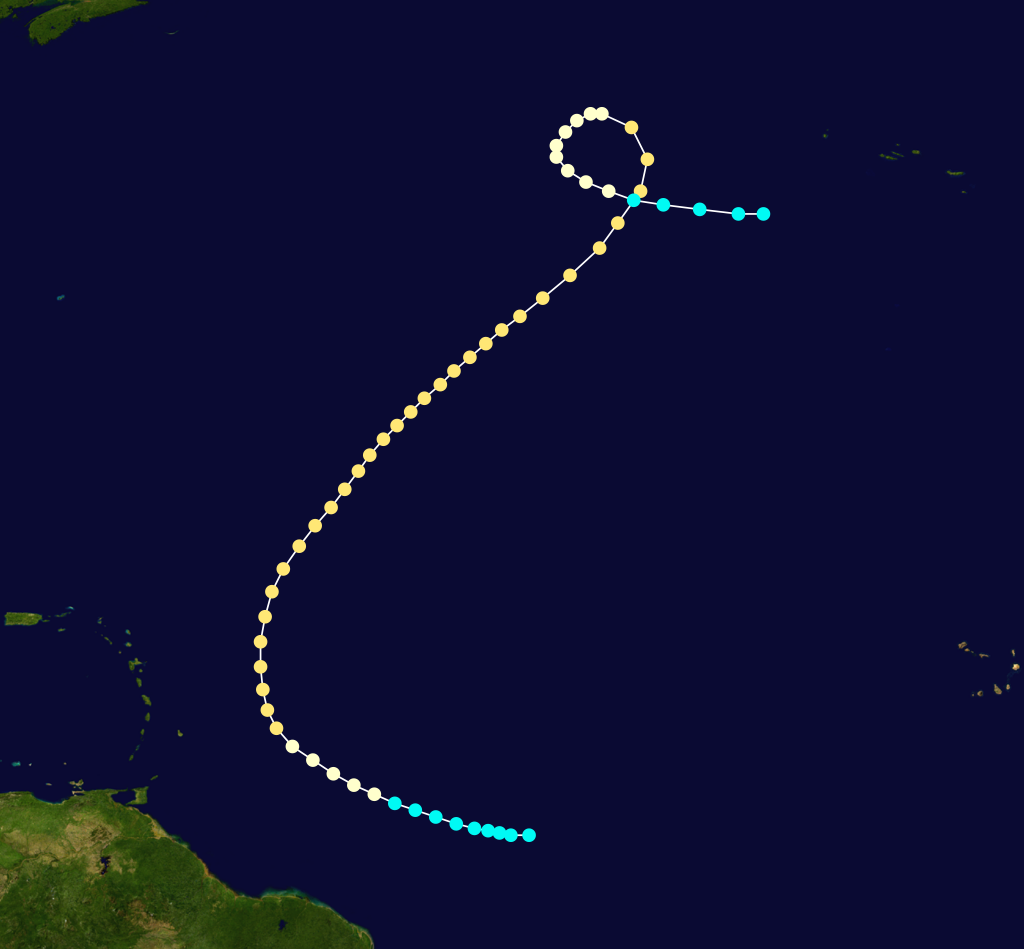
- Duration: October 26 – November 9
- Peak intensity: 100 mph (155 km/h) (1-min);

Little is known about the sixth storm of the season, which was first observed near 9°N 44°W on October 17, and intensified into a moderate hurricane as it roamed the open Atlantic for two weeks. It was last noted near 36°N 35°W on November 9. On October 28, a ship was damaged by a severe squall or possible tornado, accompanied by frequent thunder and lightning, about 800 mi (1,300 km) to the northwest of the storm's estimated track. This incident may have been related to the hurricane if it were exceptionally large, and represents the only extant observation of the storm that modern reanalysis efforts were able to uncover.

=== Tropical Storm Seven ===
- Tropical storm (SSHWS)
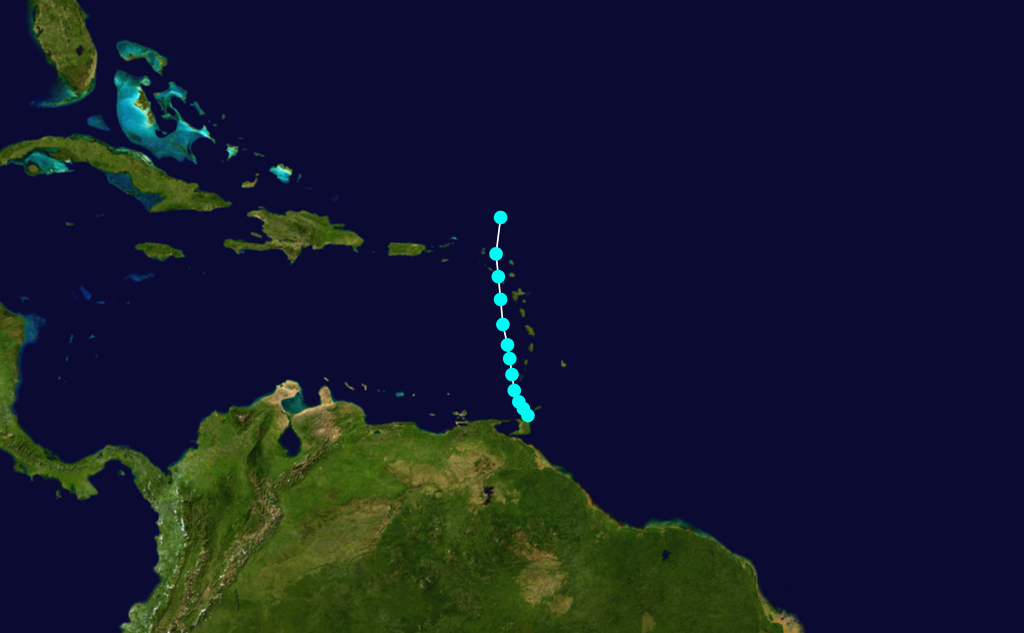
- Duration: November 27 – November 29
- Peak intensity: 60 mph (95 km/h) (1-min);

The final documented system of 1896 formed over the far southern Windward Islands on November 27. As the storm slowly tracked northward, torrential rainfall and strong winds overspread Trinidad, Saint Vincent, and Barbados. Several days of rainfall over Montserrat culminated in a "cloud burst" late on November 28, with improving conditions reported by the next morning. The storm remained below hurricane intensity and was last noted on November 29, just over 100 mi (160 km) northeast of Anguilla. In the affected islands, heavy precipitation gave rise to flash flooding along mountain streams and in valleys, destroying crops and property. Cotton, coffee, and sugar plantations sustained significant damage.

On Montserrat, one plantation recorded at least 21.15 in (537 mm) of rain in 21 hours, though the rain gauge overflowed between each of the three observations, preventing an accurate total from being obtained. It was speculated that several feet of rain may have locally fallen on certain hillsides, as evidenced by landslides that swept away trees, boulders, and large volumes of earth. Thirty-one people drowned in Plymouth after their homes were swept into the sea. Roadways were washed out in many places and the torrents reportedly washed out all but one bridge on the island. In total, 46 people drowned in the floods, while many others were left homeless. Secretary of State for the Colonies Joseph Chamberlain estimated monetary damage at £10,000 ($49,000). The destruction was compounded by a series of earthquakes that began during the storm's passage. A ship called the ship Grecian, bound from Trinidad to London, England, grounded out on a rocky section of Montserrat's coastline. Twenty-nine out of the 30 crew members died in the wreck; the sole survivor was the first mate, who reached solid ground by clutching to a piece of floating debris, and walking inland several miles.

== See also ==
- Atlantic hurricane reanalysis project
- Tropical cyclone observation
