= Hog Island (Machipongo, Virginia) =

Barrier island in Northampton County, Virginia, United States

Coordinates: 37°24′58″N 75°41′28″W

Hog Island is one of the Virginia Barrier Islands located southeast of Exmore in Northampton County, Virginia, and is a part of the Virginia Coast Reserve of The Nature Conservancy. The island, then known as Machipongo Island was first settled in 1672 by a group of 22 English colonists. The island was later abandoned and remained uninhabited until around the time of the American Revolution when it was resettled. In the late 1800s, at least five lavish hunting and fishing clubs that primarily catered to wealthy sportsmen from the Northeast were established on Virginia's barrier islands; one of the largest and most lavish of these clubs was in the town of Broadwater, Virginia, on Hog Island.

After defeating incumbent Benjamin Harrison in the 1892 U.S. presidential election to reclaim the White House thus becoming the first person elected to two non-consecutive terms as President of the United States, Grover Cleveland accepted an invitation to visit the Broadwater Club for 10 days of waterfowl hunting on Hog Island. President Cleveland returned to the Broadwater Club the following summer to go fishing. While on the island Cleveland visited lighthouse keeper George Doughty and inspected the 1853 Hog Island Light that was by then threatened by shoreline erosion. Construction began on a new lighthouse a year later and was completed in 1895.

Founded in the mid-19th century the town of Broadwater was located in a clearing in the pine forest two miles from the ocean in the center of the island. In the 1930s when rapid beach erosion caused by several hurricanes that flooded the entire island made its continued existence untenable, many of the houses and other buildings in the town of Broadwater were floated by barge to the mainland and still stand in the towns of Willis Wharf and Oyster today.

The Hog Island Light, a coastal beacon that was once the second tallest lighthouse in the United States stood for half a century on the southern end of Hog Island near Broadwater. It was decommissioned and demolished in 1948 when shoreline erosion threatened to bring it down. A Coast Guard station on Hog Island was later closed. The site where the lighthouse once stood is now nearly a mile out to sea.

In 2008, in conjunction with the Barrier Islands Center in Machipongo, Virginia, filmmaker James Spione directed a documentary, Our Island Home, which featured three of the last surviving people to be born on Hog Island. The film grew out of an ongoing oral history project at the Center designed to record survivors' memories of a bygone way of life on the island.

Since 1987 Hog Island has served as a major ecological research location for the Virginia Coast Reserve Long-Term Ecological Research (VCR/LTER) project . Hog Island is one of three primary ecological research stations used by faculty and students at the University of Virginia.

== See also ==
- Hog Island sheep
