= Virginia Coast Reserve Long-Term Ecological Research =

Ecological experiment

The Virginia Coast Reserve Long-Term Ecological Research (VCR/LTER) project is funded by the National Science Foundation. The VCR/LTER project's research activities focus on the mosaic of transitions and steady-state systems that comprise the barrier-island/lagoon/mainland landscape of the Eastern Shore of Virginia. Research is conducted in mainland marshes, the lagoon system behind the barrier islands, and on the islands themselves, particularly Hog Island. The VCR/LTER began operation in 1987. It initially focused on geophysical controls (e.g., storms) on coastal ecosystems. In 1992-1994 it broadened that focus to address the concept of ecological state change, which was linked in 1994–2000 to relationships between free surfaces (land, sea, freshwater table). More recent work (2000–2006), added a hypsometric perspective, which provides an alternate way of examining ecological patterns on the coastal landscape. It makes extensive use of the Virginia Coast Reserve of The Nature Conservancy.

The VCR/LTER is a member of the Long Term Ecological Research Network, and is administered by the Department of Environmental Sciences of the University of Virginia. Its field research headquarters is at the Anheuser-Busch Coastal Research Center of the University of Virginia in Oyster, Virginia. The research site received new funding from the National Science Foundation in 2018 which will allow the research team of Karen McGlathery, Michael Pace, Patricia Wiberg, John Porter, and to continue research projects into the impact of climate change on coastal barrier oceans.
