= Anheuser–Busch Coastal Research Center =

University of Virginia field station

Coordinates: 37°17′17.6″N 75°55′34.2″W

The Anheuser–Busch Coastal Research Center is a biological field station located in Oyster, Virginia that is operated by the University of Virginia. It is a member of the Organization of Biological Field Stations (OBFS). It serves as the research home for the Virginia Coast Reserve Long-Term Ecological Research Program. A new $2.5 million laboratory and housing facility was dedicated in on August 26, 2006.

The Center is located within the Virginia Coast Reserve, a biosphere reserve operated by the Nature Conservancy.
