= Hog Island Light =

Lighthouse in Virginia, United States

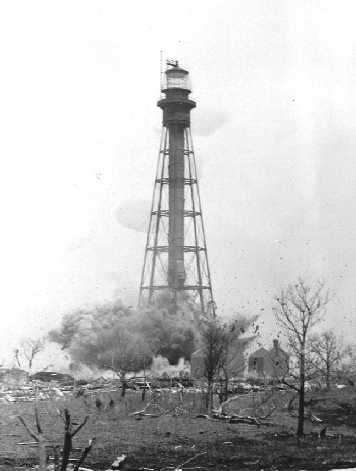
- 1948 photograph of Hog Island Light (1896 tower) (USCG)
- Location: Hog Island, SE of Exmore, Virginia
- Coordinates: 37.394°N 75.701°W (approx.)

Tower
- Construction: brick (first) cast iron (second)
- Height: 72 feet (first); 194 feet (second)
- Shape: conical (first); Octagonal pyramidal skeleton (second)

Light
- First lit: 1853 (first); 1896 (second)
- Deactivated: 1896 (first) 1948 (second)
- Lens: (first) fourth-order Fresnel Lens first-order Fresnel Lens (second)
- Range: 19 miles (17 nmi; 31 km) (second)
- Characteristic: fixed white light (first) flashing white every 45 seconds (second)

The Hog Island Light was a lighthouse roughly marking its eponymous island, and thus the north side of the Great Machipongo Inlet on the Virginia coast. Originally, no light existed between Cape Henlopen, Delaware and Cape Charles. In 1830 the United States Congress appropriated money for a coastal beacon in the general vicinity of Chincoteague Island. The following year, the Collector of Customs in Norfolk selected Assateague Island.

In 1827 the first shipment of sweet potatoes from farmers on the Eastern Shore was sent to New York City aboard the schooner Providence under the command of Captain Lewis Matthews from Thomas's Wharf on the Machipongo River. One of the few deep-water ports on the sea side of the Delmarva Peninsula, vessels traveling between Norfolk and New York City began frequenting Thomas's Wharf to load produce during the growing season. So in 1853 another lighthouse was erected twenty miles north of Cape Charles at Hog Island to light the remaining section of coastline between the Assateague Light and the entrance to the Chesapeake Bay and guide ships to the Great Machipongo Inlet.

== History ==
There have been two lights at Hog Island, one of the Virginia Barrier Islands located southeast of Exmore. The first light was erected in 1853 and consisted of a 45 foot tall whitewashed brick tower with a keeper's dwelling adjacent to it. It was ostensibly equipped with a first-order Fresnel lens, though a report in 1870 stated that it had been assigned a fourth-order lens instead.

Erosion of the island eventually endangered the first lighthouse, and in 1896 an octagonal iron skeleton tower similar to the 1895 Cape Charles Light was erected to replace it. This new lighthouse, the second tallest in the United States at 194 feet, was built more than a half mile back from the ocean in a clearing in the dense pine forest that once covered most of Hog Island. It was the sister light of Cape Charles (1895/191 ft), both skeletal steel super-structures, Hog Island featured an antenna that gave it the 3 ft height difference. This has been carefully analyzed utilizing the photograph taken by Eliot Elisofon in 1944 for Time Magazine. The new Hog Island tower was painted black to distinguish it from the nearly identical sister, Cape Charles light that is painted white.

In 1900 early in the evening on Washington's Birthday a huge flock of birds, mostly geese and ducks, smashed into the lantern of the Hog Island Lighthouse. The two keepers fired their shotguns at the birds to drive them away before the lens was damaged. Two days later another flock of birds flew in. Out of ammunition, the keepers had to drive them away with sticks. This time much of the lantern glass was broken out and the light was extinguished until repairs were made.

The 1933 Chesapeake–Potomac hurricane damaged the light station and caused severe shoreline erosion on Hog Island. Also in 1933 both the Hog Island Light and the Cape Charles light were electrified eliminating the need for the keepers to hoist buckets of oil to the lantern room. The 1938 New England hurricane passed just offshore of the Delmarva Peninsula before making landfall at Long Island finally toppled the 1853 tower which was by then 50 feet offshore and surrounded by breakers. The barrier island continued to shift westward at a rapid rate and in 1948 this second lighthouse was deactivated by the Coast Guard as the waves lapping at its base threatened to bring it down.

Although the Hog Island tower was of a type that could be disassembled and moved, the lighthouse was not relocated. After the completion of the New York, Philadelphia and Norfolk Railroad in the late 19th century most Eastern Shore produce began to be transported to New York and other northern cities by rail rather than by ship reducing the need for a coastal beacon to mark the Great Machipongo Inlet. Also, by the mid 20th century The role of lighthouses in guiding ships had become less important since the establishment of LORAN stations along the coast during World War II, so the Hog Island lighthouse was demolished in 1948.

The site where the Hog Island Light station once stood near the village of Broadwater long ago vanished beneath the waves and is now nearly a mile out to sea, but the 10-foot high first-order Fresnel lens, produced by the Henry-LePaute Company in France, and originally installed in the second Cape Charles Lighthouse before being transferred to Hog Island in 1895, was removed from the lighthouse and preserved when the light station was deactivated. The lens was first displayed at the Mariners' Museum in Newport News; in 2004 it was moved to an enclosed pavilion designed to resemble the lighthouse's lantern room on the Portsmouth, Virginia waterfront.

== Keepers ==
- Charles Sterling (1901-1907),
- George Doughty (c. 1907-1920),
- Stanley L. Phillips (c. 1920-1933),
- Charles Kearn (Coast Guard 1942-1943)<cite web
