= Santa Cruz sheep =

Breed of sheep

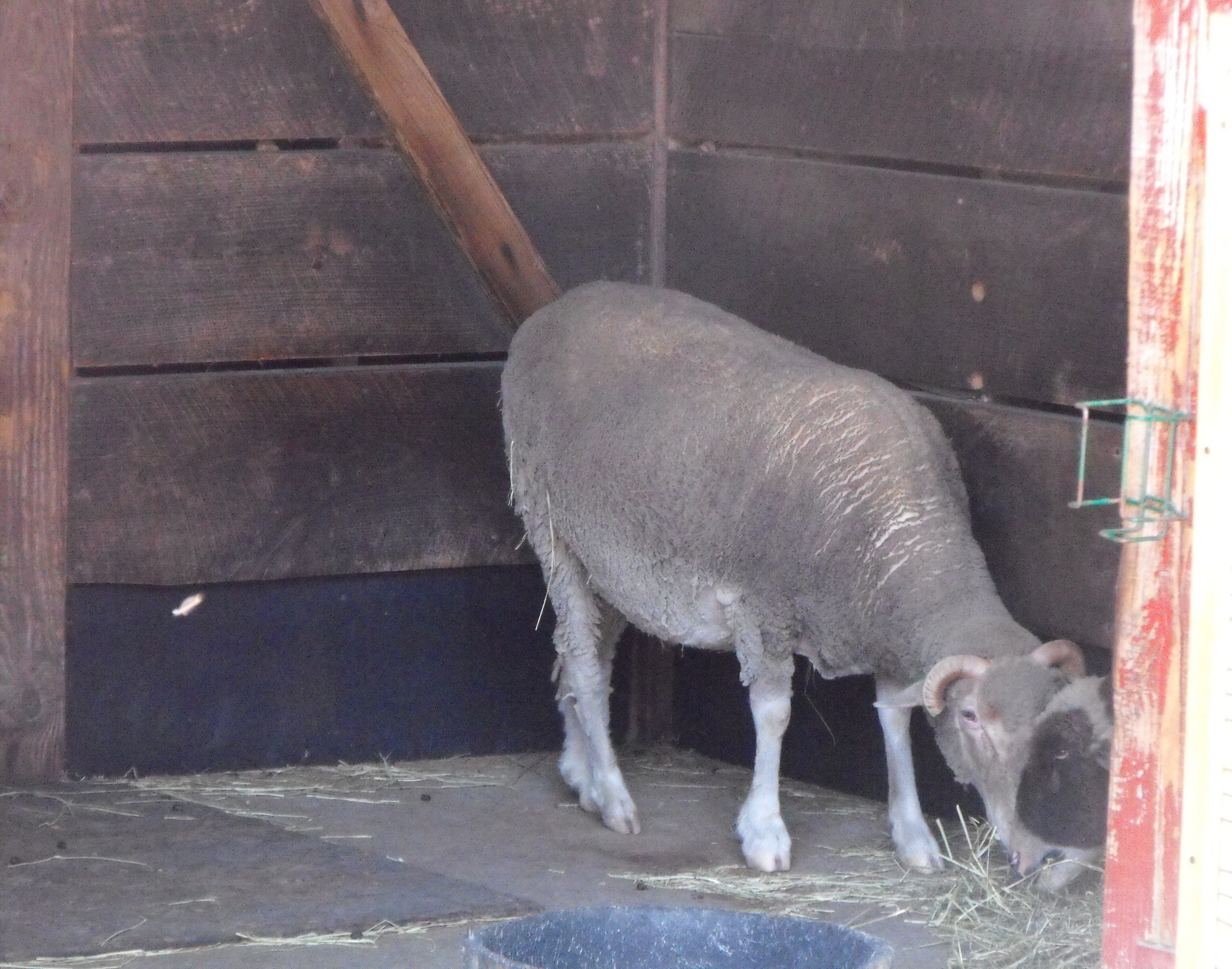
- Santa Cruz sheep at the Roger Williams Park Zoo
- Conservation status: Endangered
- Country of origin: United States
- Type: Feral breed
- Use: Wool

Traits
- Wool color: White
- Face color: White

Santa Cruz sheep are an extremely rare breed of domestic sheep that once existed as a feral population on the Santa Cruz Island of the Channel Islands of California. Small and hardy, the sheep were all killed or removed from the island to prevent destruction of natural habitats. Today, they number fewer than 200 animals. This breed is primarily raised for wool.

== History ==
In the mid-19th century, sheep that were most likely of the Merino, Rambouillet (French Merino), or Churro breed were brought to Santa Cruz Island. By the 1860s, thousands of sheep grazed freely on the island. Throughout the 20th century, ranching declined on the island and most of the sheep became feral. In 1978, The Nature Conservancy gained control of the island; sheep numbers around this time were estimated to be over 20,000. Later, the Nature Conservancy and the National Park Service began to kill or remove all sheep remaining to prevent overgrazing of the island's vegetation. Today, the breed has fewer than 200 animals remaining, and is considered "critical" by the American Livestock Breeds Conservancy. A small population of the sheep exists on the mainland, and were largely placed through adoption.

== Characteristics ==
Like many breeds of island sheep, Santa Cruz sheep are relatively small and extremely hardy. They are good foragers and need no assistance with lambing. However, because of the fine-wooled breeds that they are derived from, Santa Cruz sheep are unique among formerly feral island breeds in their medium to fine wool with a soft feel. Their fleeces are mostly white, but some colored sheep are known among the breed.

== Conservancy ==
In 1988, the Livestock Conservancy placed twelve of the island's lambs with five California breeders. Additional sheep were brought from the island in 1991. In 2017, there were less than a dozen breeders in the United States.

== See also ==
- Hog Island sheep
