= Cape Charles Lighthouse =

Lighthouse in Virginia, United States

Cape Charles Light
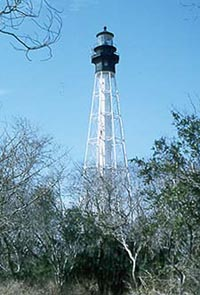
- Cape Charles Light in 1995
- Location: Smith Island off Cape Charles at the mouth of the Chesapeake Bay
- Coordinates: 37.12292°N 75.90647°W

Tower
- Constructed: 1828
- Construction: cast iron skeleton tower
- Automated: 1963
- Height: 191 feet (58 m)
- Shape: Octagonal pyramidal skeleton
- Markings: lantern and watchroom, black tower, white
- Heritage: National Register of Historic Places listed place, Virginia Historic Landmark

Light
- First lit: 1895
- Deactivated: 2019
- Focal height: 180 feet (55 m)
- Lens: First order Fresnel lens (original), Vega VRB-25 solar-powered beacon (current)
- Range: 18 nautical miles (33 km; 21 mi)
- Characteristic: Fl W 5s
- Cape Charles Light Station
- U.S. National Register of Historic Places
- Virginia Landmarks Register
- Nearest city: Kiptopeke, Virginia
- Area: 10 acres (4.0 ha)
- Built: 1894
- MPS: Light Stations of the United States MPS
- NRHP reference No.: 03000569
- VLR No.: 065-0071

Significant dates
- Added to NRHP: June 23, 2003
- Designated VLR: December 4, 2002

Cape Charles Lighthouse is an octagonal cast iron skeleton tower lighthouse at the mouth of the Chesapeake Bay on Smith Island which was officially removed from service in 2019. It is the tallest lighthouse in Virginia and the second tallest in the United States.

== History ==
This particular tower is the third lighthouse at this location. The first lighthouse at Cape Charles was a 55-foot (17 m) masonry tower completed in 1828. It was quickly deemed inadequate for its important seacoast location due to its low height and poor visibility at sea. It was soon threatened by erosion so in 1864 it was replaced by a 150-foot (46 m) masonry tower built further inland. Located a little more than a mile southwest of the old tower and 600 feet from the shoreline, the impressive 150-foot-tall conical brick tower was similar in appearance to the 1857 Cape May Lighthouse, painted white and topped with a dark brown lantern room. In 1892, a twenty-five-foot red band was painted around the white tower's midsection, about sixty feet up from the base, to make it more visible during the day. By the 1890s, it too was threatened by beach erosion which jetties built to protect it failed to halt, and with the lighthouse now only 300 feet from the ocean and the shoreline eroding at a rate of 37 feet per year it was decided that a third lighthouse needed to be built three quarters of a mile inland.

The first proposal for Cape Charles’ third lighthouse called for a conical structure of iron plates, similar in design to the new Cape Henry Lighthouse, but in the end, a bid of $78,200 was accepted to construct 191-foot (58 m) octagonal steel skeletal towers at both Cape Charles and Hog Island, a barrier island twenty miles to the north where another lighthouse was being threatened by shoreline erosion. This design had several advantages: it was much cheaper than the Cape Henry model, and distinct enough from the Cape Henry tower that the two would not be mistaken for each other.

The new station's lens was installed and tested in June 1895, however, its full-time service was delayed until mid-August so mariners could be properly informed of the station's new light characteristic. Lt. Frederick Mahan of the Lighthouse Board proposed that all U.S. lighthouses be given a “numerical flash” pattern. The first-order lens at Cape Charles made a complete revolution every thirty seconds, producing nine flashes: four quick flashes followed by a dark interval of three seconds, then five more flashes followed by sixteen seconds of darkness. Cape Charles would thus have a 4-5 pattern, and mariners could easily associate these numbers with Cape Charles. This numbering system was likened to a fire alarm bell stroking out the exact numerical identity of a beleaguered building. “By this method,” Mahan maintained, “the light is identified absolutely…” Due to the high cost of these special lenses, only the “4-5” light at Cape Charles, and the “1-4-3” light at Minots Ledge were ever deployed.

With a height of 191 feet, the third and final Cape Charles tower is the second tallest lighthouse in the United States. The tower consists of a central iron tube surrounded by eight massive legs. A spiral staircase with 216 treads, enclosed in the tube, leads upwards to the generator room. Ascending seventeen more steps from there, one arrives at the watch room, where the lower gallery may be accessed. The tower is painted white, while the upper rooms are a contrasting black.

The lens was removed from the second Cape Charles Lighthouse in October 1895 and transferred to the Hog Island Light. On June 1, 1896, the speed of rotation of the lens in the new tower was cut in half as the flashes were being produced in such quick succession that they were indistinct when viewed from a distance. After having served as an observation tower during World War I the second Cape Charles Lighthouse finally toppled into the ocean on July 2, 1927. Both the Cape Charles light and the Hog Island Light were electrified in 1933, completing the electrification of all coastal beacons in the fifth lighthouse district.

In 1963 the lighthouse was fully automated and the first order Fresnel Lens was replaced by a more powerful DCB-224 aerobeacon. The original lens from the Cape Charles lighthouse is on display at the Mariners' Museum in Newport News, Virginia. The Cape Charles Lighthouse housed a Vega VRB-25 solar powered beacon from the 1990s until its decommissioning as an aid to navigation in 2019.

A brush fire on July 13, 2000, burned down the 1895 head keeper's dwelling, a wood privy, and a storage shed. The two assistant keeper's dwellings were torn down around 1960, prior to automation of the lighthouse, but the head keeper's house, along with an oil house and generator building, had been sold to a hunting club before being taken over by The Nature Conservancy in 1995.

In 2013 the Cape Charles light was reported extinguished but the beacon was never repaired by the Coast Guard. It remained out of service until the Cape Charles Lighthouse was officially decommissioned in 2019.

Although the Cape Charles lighthouse is visible from the Chesapeake Bay Bridge Tunnel its remote location on a marshy barrier island that is inaccessible except by shallow draft boat and is a nature preserve prevents it from being open to the public. No longer maintained by the Coast Guard, the lighthouse is in poor condition.
