= Patricia Wiberg =

American hydrologist

Patricia Louise Wiberg
- Education: University of Washington
- Scientific career
- Workplaces: University of Virginia
- Thesis: Mechanics of bedload sediment transport (1987)

Patricia Wiberg is a professor at University of Virginia known for her research on the transport of sediments in aquatic environments.

== Education and career ==
Wiberg has a B.A. in mathematics from Brown University (1976), and an M.S. (1983) and a Ph.D. (1987) from the University of Washington. Wiberg is a fellow of the American Geophysical Union, and a fellow of the American Association for the Advancement of Science who cited her "for distinguished contributions to understanding the causes and consequences of sediment movements in aquatic systems."

== Research ==
Wiberg studies coastal environments with a focus on how disturbances such as storms, sea-level rise, and temperature change coastal areas Through her integration of data and models, she examines changes in salt marshes in the context of environmental changes. While in graduate school, Wiberg and colleagues found evidence in the Brazos River beds in Texas for a tsunami that was at least 1000 feet high which would have occurred at the Cretaceous-Tertiary boundary. She has also examined the impact of the shape of sediments on eddy correlation flux measurements. Since 2006, Wiberg has been a co-principal investigator at the National Science Foundation-funded Virginia Coast Reserve Long-Term Ecological Research where she has been working on water and sediment dynamics.

=== Selected publications ===
- Hornberger, George M.; Wiberg, Patricia L.; Raffensperger, Jeff P.; D'Odorico, Paolo (2014). Elements of Physical Hydrology. The Johns Hopkins University Press. ISBN 9781421413730.
- Bourgeois, J.; Hansen, T. A.; Wiberg, P. L.; Kauffman, E. G. (1988-07-29). "A Tsunami Deposit at the Cretaceous-Tertiary Boundary in Texas". Science. 241 (4865): 567–570. Bibcode:1988Sci...241..567B. doi:10.1126/science.241.4865.567. ISSN 0036-8075. PMID 17774578. S2CID 7447635.
- Wiberg, Patricia L.; Harris, Courtney K. (1994). "Ripple geometry in wave-dominated environments". Journal of Geophysical Research: Oceans. 99 (C1): 775–789. Bibcode:1994JGR....99..775W. doi:10.1029/93JC02726. ISSN 2156-2202.
- Wiberg, Patricia L.; Smith, J. Dungan (1987). "Calculations of the critical shear stress for motion of uniform and heterogeneous sediments". Water Resources Research. 23 (8): 1471–1480. Bibcode:1987WRR....23.1471W. doi:10.1029/WR023i008p01471. ISSN 1944-7973.
- Wiberg, Patricia L.; Fagherazzi, Sergio; Kirwan, Matthew L. (3 January 2020). "Improving Predictions of Salt Marsh Evolution Through Better Integration of Data and Models". Annual Review of Marine Science. 12 (1): 389–413. Bibcode:2020ARMS...12..389W. doi:10.1146/annurev-marine-010419-010610. ISSN 1941-1405. PMID 31283424. S2CID 195845288.

== Awards and honors ==
- Fellow, American Geophysical Union (2017)
- Fellow, American Association for the Advancement of Science (2020)
