= Virginia Coast Reserve =

Volgenau Virginia Coast Reserve
- Location within Virginia Location within the United States
- Location: Virginia's Atlantic coast
- Coordinates: 37.4163°N 75.689°W
- Area: 40,000 acres (160 km^{2})
- Governing body: The Nature Conservancy
- Website: Official website

U.S. National Natural Landmark
- Designated: 1979

The Volgenau Virginia Coast Reserve (prior to August 2020 known as the Virginia Coast Reserve) is a biosphere reserve created by The Nature Conservancy in the early 1970s. It consists of 40,000 acres across 14 of the Virginia Barrier Islands along the Atlantic coast of the Virginia portion of the Delmarva Peninsula, including Parramore Island, Hog Island, Virginia, Smith Island, Virginia, Assawoman Island, and Metompkin Island. These barrier islands play an important role in sheltering the mainland portions of the Eastern Shore of Virginia from the impact of coastal storms and are important for breeding and migrating beach nesting and colonial waterbirds, including piping plovers. It also serves as the research location for the Virginia Coast Reserve Long-Term Ecological Research (VCR LTER) project.

The reserve was designated a National Natural Landmark by the National Park Service in 1979.

In August 2020, the Nature Conservancy renamed the reserve in honor of multiple gifts by engineer Ernst Volgenau and his family over 30 years.

== See also ==
- List of National Natural Landmarks in Virginia
