= Smith Island, Virginia =

Island in Northampton County, Virginia, United States

Coordinates: 37°8′38″N 75°52′28″W

Smith Island is one of the Virginia Barrier Islands located adjacent to the southern end of the Eastern Shore of Virginia in Northampton County near Cape Charles.

The island bears the name of Captain John Smith the explorer who visited it in 1608. In 1614, Governor Thomas Dale sent 20 men, under Lieutenant William Craddock, to the area to establish a salt works and to catch fish for the colonists. They intended to make salt by boiling down the sea water. They settled along Old Plantation Creek at Dale's Gift on the mainland, but established the salt works on Smith Island.

== History ==
Legendary pirate Edward Teach, known as Blackbeard, sometimes used Smith Island as a stopover to careen his ships. Three centuries later a creek and cove on the island still bear his name. Though he traveled far and wide Blackbeard found fertile pirating grounds in the area off the Virginia Capes. On Sept. 29, 1717 he and Captain Benjamin Hornigold captured the sloop Betty off Cape Charles and plundered her cargo of Madeira wine and other valuables and scuttled the ship.

For over two centuries Smith Island was held by the Custis family of Virginia having been granted to John Custis in 1691. The ancestral home of the Custis family, Arlington Plantation, was located nearby. Martha Custis Washington owned the barrier island, as did her great-granddaughter, Mary Custis whose husband Robert E. Lee gave an account of the island after inspecting it in 1832 while stationed at nearby Fort Monroe with the United States Army.

Lee wrote that Smith Island was "nearer the level of the sea than I expected to find it". He described the surface of the island as being "composed of alternate ridges and glades running as near as I could judge from north to south and from one extremity to the other". He found "the soil of the glades is as rich as possible and covered with fine grass, that of the ridges contains a great deal of sand and is covered with pine". At the time of Lee's visit the island was occupied by four tenant farmers. Lee wrote that each tenant family had "30 to 40 head of cattle which they milk, take care of, and so forth, and as they rapidly increase will be at last valuable". He also estimated that there were an additional 150 head of wild cattle and 100 wild sheep roaming the island. Smith Island remained in the Custis-Lee family until 1911 and continued to be used for grazing cattle through the mid 1920s. In the mid 20th century the island was home to a waterfowl hunting club.

The Cape Charles Lighthouse is located on Smith Island. The current lighthouse, an octagonal steel skeleton tower, is the third lighthouse built on the island, the other two having been lost to shoreline erosion as the barrier island migrated westward. Smith island has been uninhabited since 1963 when the Cape Charles lighthouse was automated and the keepers left. The head lightkeeper's house built in 1895 stood on the island until July 13, 2000 when it was destroyed by a brush fire. Three steel skeleton watchtowers constructed near the lighthouse by the US Army during World War II still stand on the island.

Smith Island has been owned by The Nature Conservancy since 1995. The Cape Charles light was discontinued by the US Coast Guard in 2019, but the lighthouse, the second tallest in the United States, remains standing on the island.

== See also ==
- Smith Island, Maryland is a different island located in the Chesapeake Bay which is split between Maryland and Virginia; only the Maryland portion is inhabited.
