= Parramore Island Natural Area Preserve =

Natural Area Preserve in Virginia, United States

- Location within Virginia
- Location: Accomack County, Virginia
- Coordinates: 37°32′45″N 75°37′58″W
- Area: 7,000 acres (28 km^{2})
- Owner: The Nature Conservancy

Parramore Island Natural Area Preserve is a 7,000-acre (28 km^{2}) Natural Area Preserve located in Accomack County, Virginia, United States. Located on one of the barrier islands along the Atlantic Ocean, it is the state's largest Natural Area Preserve. More than 7.5 miles (12.1 km) long, it features a number of beaches, dunes, scrubs, marshes, and natural communities.

The preserve is owned by The Nature Conservancy as part of their Virginia Coast Reserve, which includes 13 additional uninhabited barrier islands. Although it is not typically open to the public, access for research or educational purposes may be obtained from The Nature Conservancy.

== See also ==
- List of Virginia Natural Area Preserves
