= Hog Island sheep =

Breed of sheep

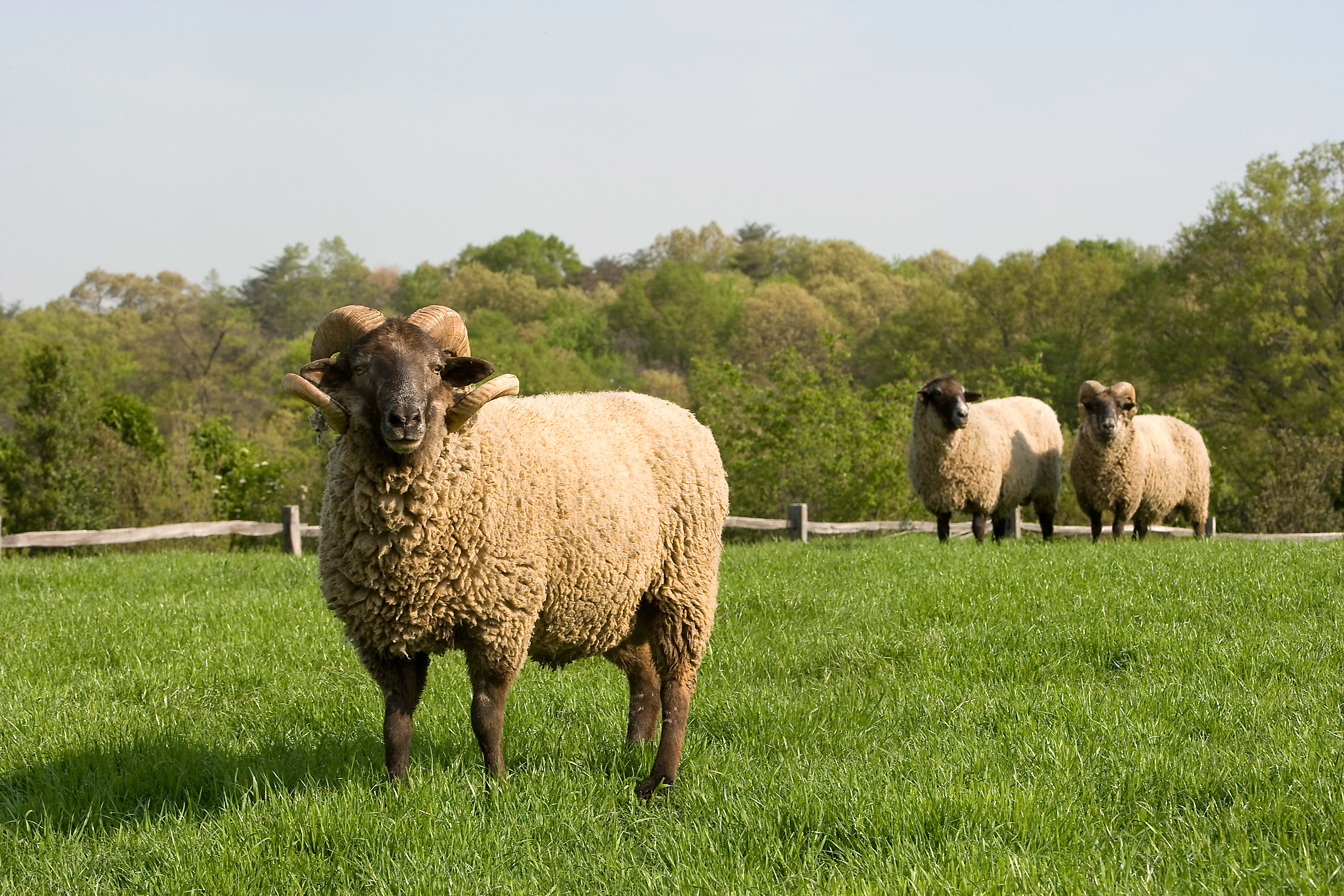
- Hog Island sheep kept at George Washington's Mount Vernon estate
- Conservation status: Critical
- Country of origin: United States

Traits
- Weight: Male: 125 pounds (57 kg); Female: 90 pounds (41 kg)
- Wool color: most individuals white (about 10% are black)
- Face color: white with black speckles

Hog Island sheep are a breed of sheep descended from animals first brought to Virginia's Hog Island in the 18th century. During the 1930s and 1940s, storm conditions forced the island's residents to evacuate, leaving some sheep behind. These sheep adapted to the environment free of human intervention, becoming feral.

The breed is preserved by various organizations because of its relevance to American history and its resemblance to historical American sheep. It also possesses some traits that have been somewhat lost in more modern breeds.

== Breed characteristics ==
The Hog Island sheep is a feral breed, descended from sheep abandoned on Hog Island in the 1930s and 1940s. It is believed that the breed was descended from the Merino breed, among others, possibly the Improved Leicester or other English breeds. The sheep is relatively small but tough and hardy. Rams weigh on average 125 pounds (57 kg) and ewes 90 pounds (41 kg). Lambs are born with spotted or speckled fleece; about 90% of adults have white fleece and 10% black. Both males and females can have horns, and about half the total population do.

The Hog Island sheep is not commonly used in modern agriculture, largely because of its endangered status and because more modern breeds have been bred for other characteristics, including maximum size and fleece yield. It is nevertheless considered important to preserve because of the insight it may give into American history and the traits it has that modern sheep might lack such as its toughness, foraging skill, efficient use of food, and easy lambing.

== History ==
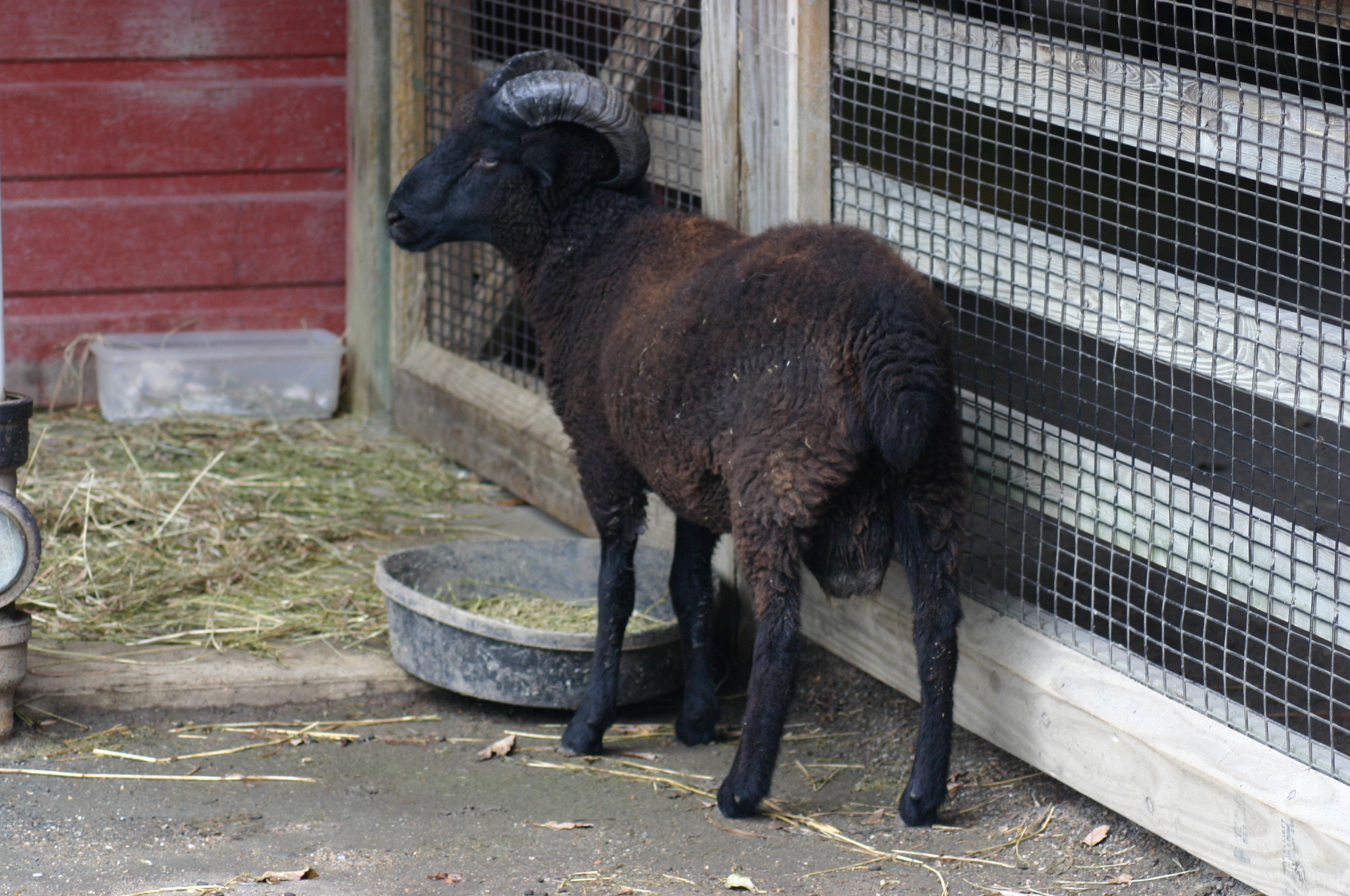
Most Hog Island sheep are white, but there are black individuals.

Hog Island was colonized in the 17th century. The sheep that colonists would have been using at the time would have been the contemporary English breeds, but Merinos were known to roam the barrier islands, having swum ashore from Spanish ships that wrecked along the coast. The colonists would have used some combination of these sheep in their flocks.

As an island, Hog Island had open space and lacked predators, therefore the colonists allowed their livestock to roam free, rounding them up only to mark them or to use them for meat or wool. In 1933 a hurricane destroyed most of the island; the inhabitants abandoned the settled areas and many sheep were left to fend for themselves, reverting to a feral state. The Nature Conservancy bought the island in the 1970s, rounded up the sheep, and removed them to prevent overgrazing. The breed is extremely rare today; with fewer than 200 registered animals it is listed as "critical" by The Livestock Conservancy.

=== Research and conservation (after rediscovery) ===
When the Nature Conservancy bought Hog Island, most of the sheep were bought by private owners. Some were taken to Blacksburg, where Virginia Tech researchers studied the sheep to determine why they were relatively free of parasites; the researchers concluded that the sheep had no special resistance to parasites but were simply isolated from them by their habitat. The sheep were then sent to institutions such as George Washington's birthplace, Mount Vernon, and the National Colonial Farm at Piscataway Park for preservation and increasing public awareness of endangered livestock breeds. The United States Department of Agriculture's National Animal Germplasm Program has collected semen samples from several of the sheep as part of a program that aims to preserve the genetic material of animals significant to American history. Because Hog Island sheep resemble the small, short-fleeced sheep that would have been raised in colonial farms for meat and wool, they (or a cross between them and Dorset sheep, a combination called "American Site sheep") are used in exhibits to recreate the look and feel of a historical farm.

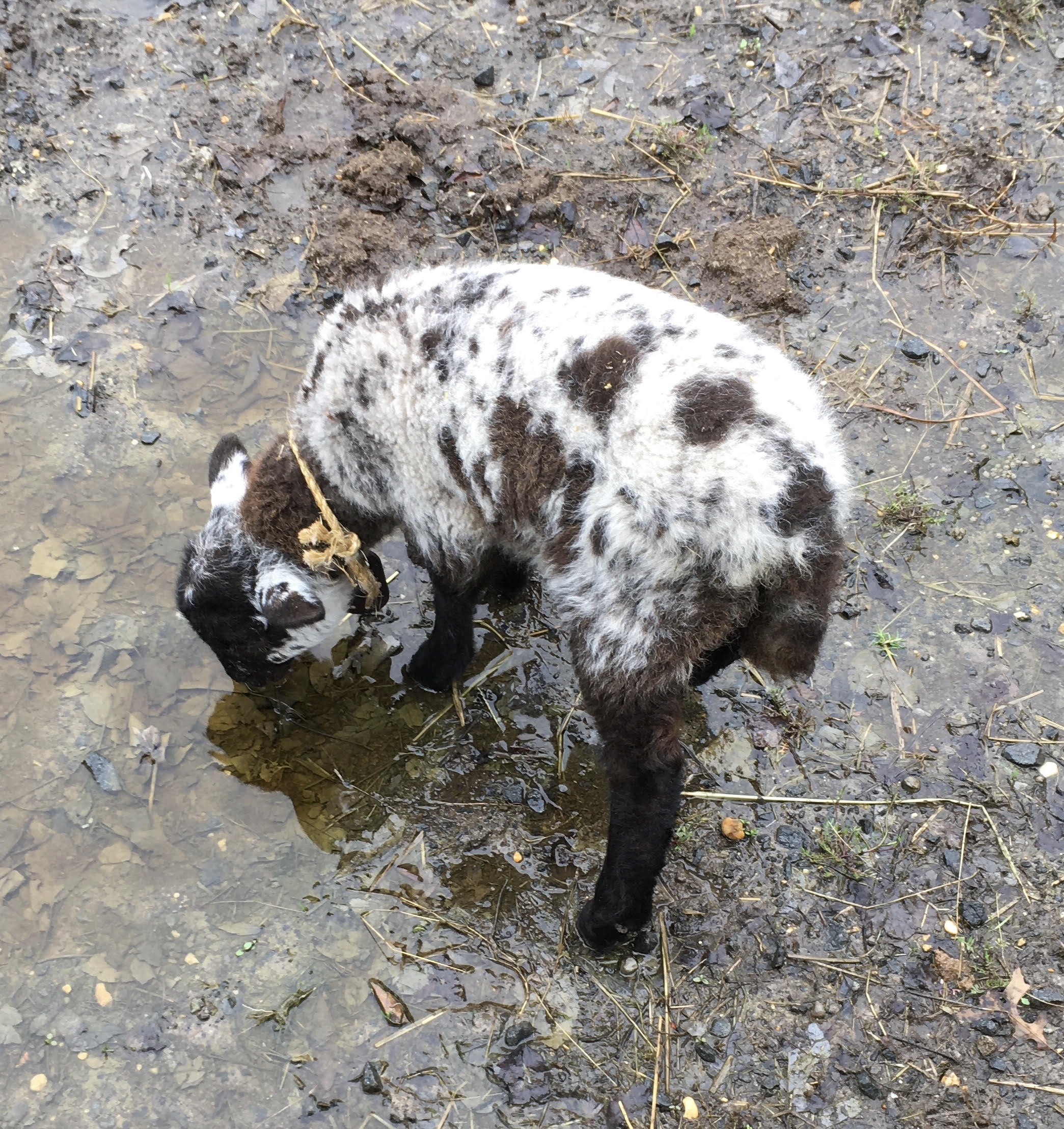
A young Hog Island Sheep at the Accokeek Foundation

Because the Hog Island sheep population is so small, the preservation of the breed through a pure, inbred line would threaten the breed's health by an increased risk of pairing of "bad genes". Stillbirths and atypical-looking sheep have been reported by some breeders. In response, some breeders have crossed Hog Island sheep with other breeds, including Gulf Coast Native sheep, and then bred the offspring with pure Hog Island sheep, producing almost pure Hog Island sheep except for the addition of some genetic diversity.

== See also ==
- Santa Cruz sheep
