= Willis Wharf, Virginia =

Unincorporated community in Virginia, US

Coordinates: 37°30′56″N 75°48′24″W

- Census-designated place
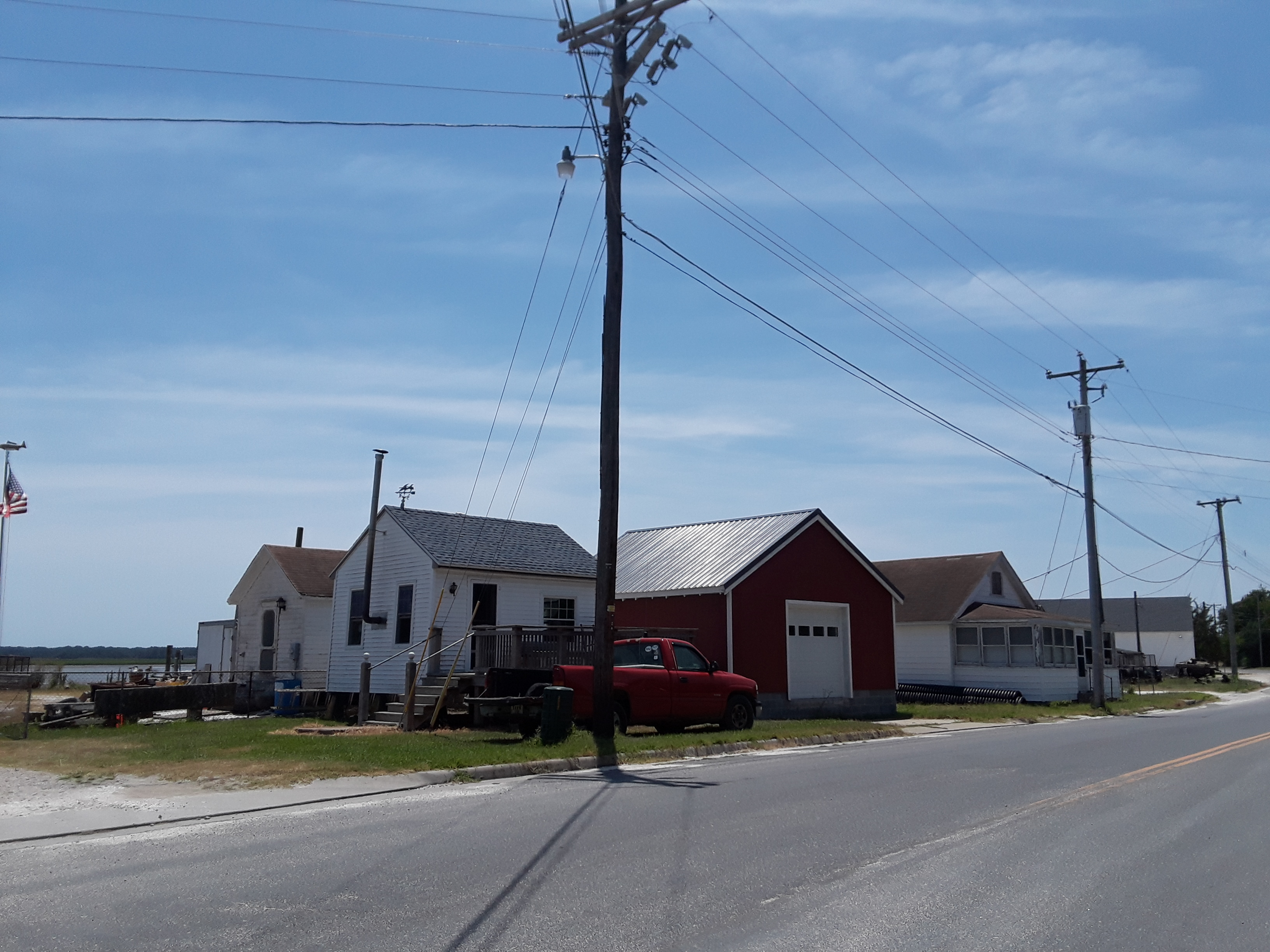
- Street scene in Willis Wharf, July 2018

- Location within Virginia Location within the United States
- Country: United States
- State: Virginia
- County: Northampton
- Elevation: 23 ft (7.0 m)

Population (2020)
  - Total: 210
- Time zone: UTC-5 (Eastern (EST))
  - Summer (DST): UTC-4 (EDT)
- GNIS feature ID: 2807432

Willis Wharf is an unincorporated community and census-designated place in Northampton County, Virginia, United States. It was first listed as a CDP in the 2020 census with a population of 210.

== Demographics ==
Willis Wharf first appeared as a census designated place in the 2020 U.S. census.

Willis Wharf CDP, Virginia – Racial and ethnic composition Note: the US Census treats Hispanic/Latino as an ethnic category. This table excludes Latinos from the racial categories and assigns them to a separate category. Hispanics/Latinos may be of any race.
Race / Ethnicity (NH = Non-Hispanic)	Pop 2020	2020
White alone (NH)	172	81.90%
Black or African American alone (NH)	17	8.10%
Native American or Alaska Native alone (NH)	0	0.00%
Asian alone (NH)	0	0.00%
Native Hawaiian or Pacific Islander alone (NH)	0	0.00%
Other race alone (NH)	0	0.00%
Mixed race or Multiracial (NH)	4	1.90%
Hispanic or Latino (any race)	17	8.10%
Total	210	100.00%

As of the 2020 census there were 210 people, including 129 housing units and 68 families, living in Willis Wharf.

48.9% of the population spoke Spanish, and 51.1% spoke English.

Nearly three-quarters (74.4%) of the population were working. 62.5% of the employed population worked in the retail trade and 37.5% worked in construction.
