= Oyster, Virginia =

Unincorporated community in Virginia, US

Coordinates: 37°17′11″N 75°55′21″W

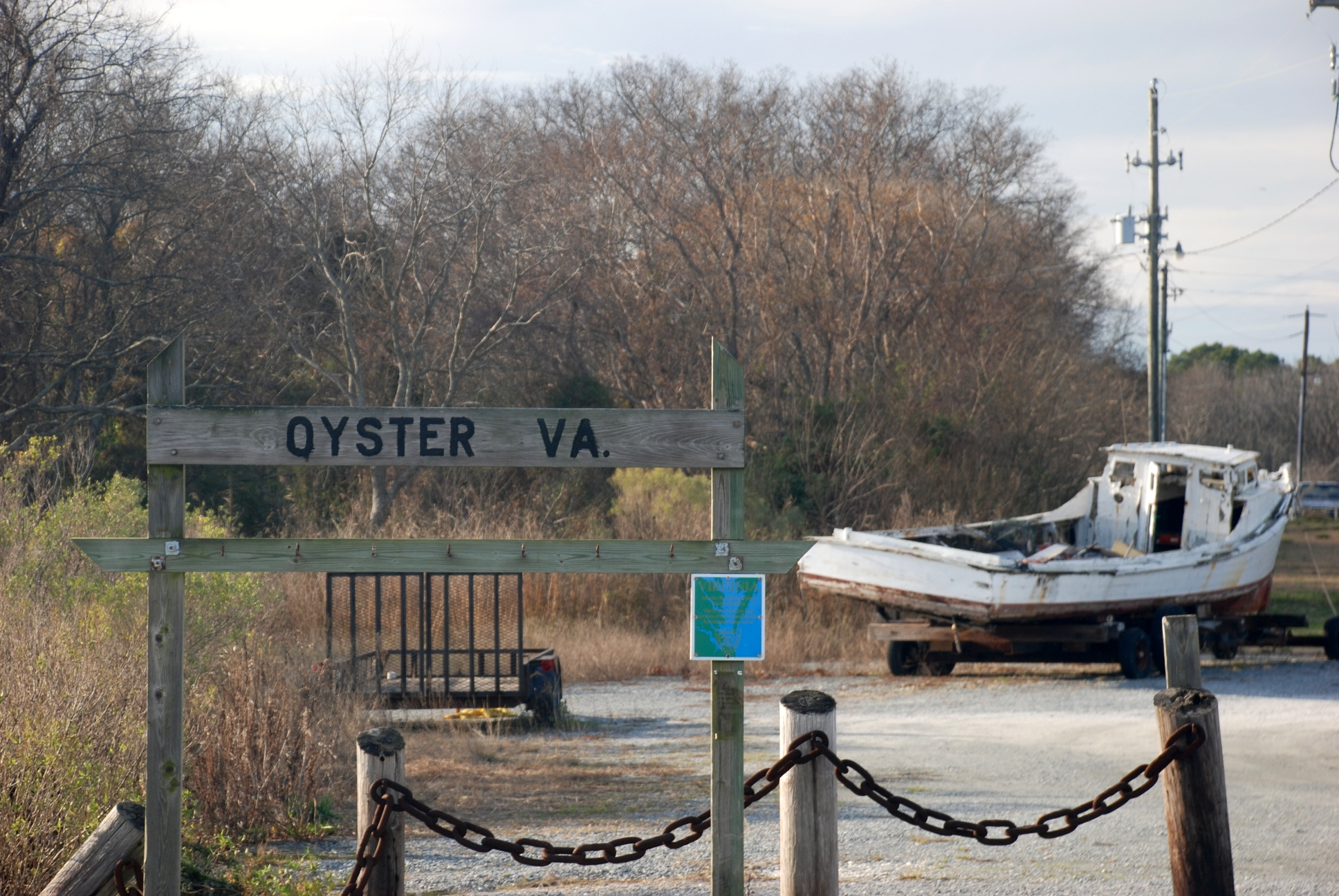
Sign at Oyster docks

Oyster is a small unincorporated community on the Atlantic Coast of the Eastern Shore of the U.S. state of Virginia in Northampton County. It is at an elevation of 3 feet (1 m) above sea level.

== Climate ==
The climate in this area is characterized by hot, humid summers and generally mild to cool winters. According to the Köppen Climate Classification system, Oyster has a humid subtropical climate, abbreviated "Cfa" on climate maps.

== See also ==
- Anheuser–Busch Coastal Research Center
