= Chesapeake Bay Bridge–Tunnel =

Bridge–tunnel spanning the mouth of the Chesapeake Bay in Virginia

Chesapeake Bay Bridge – Tunnel
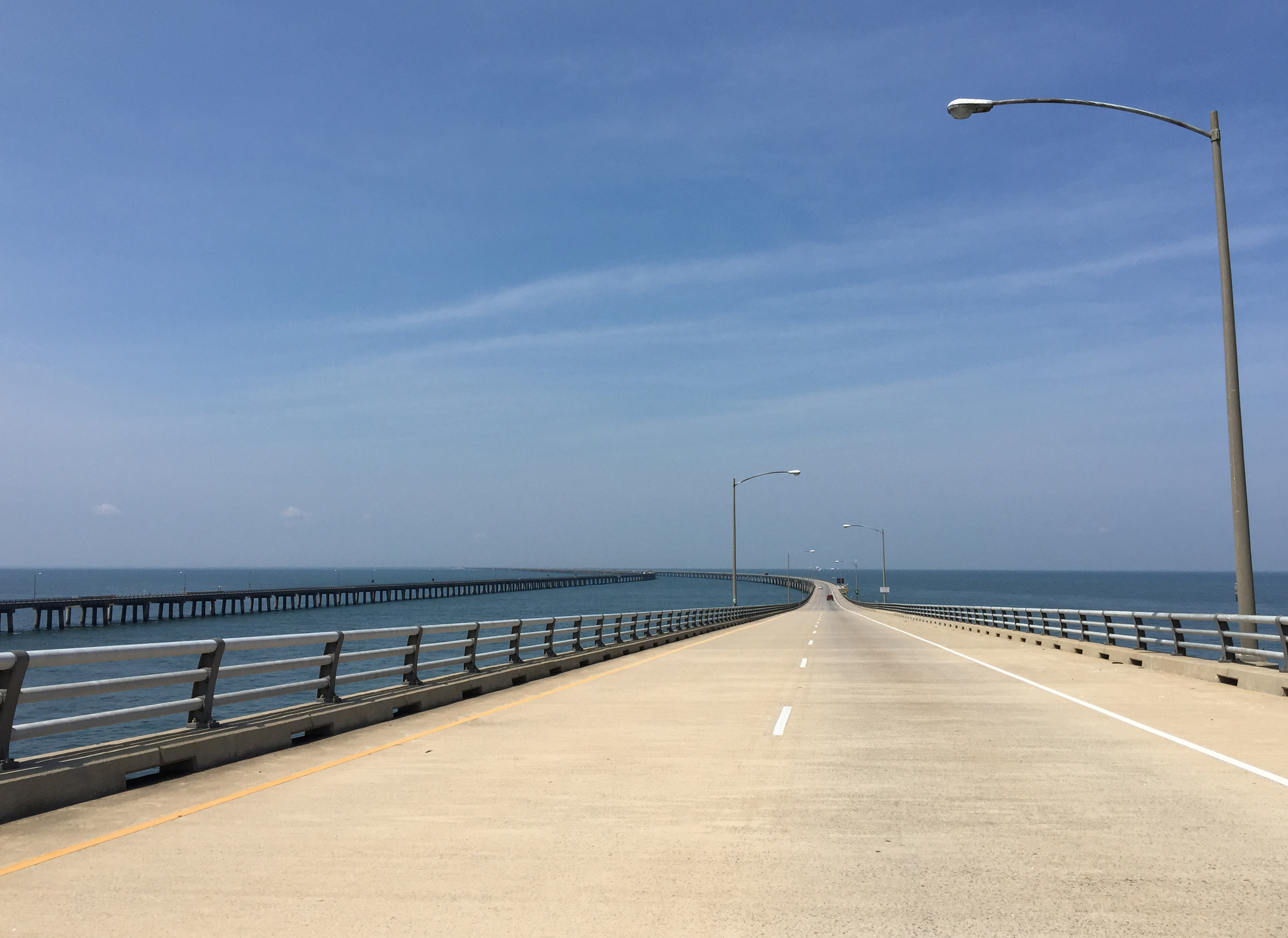
- Coming down from the high-level portion near the north end
- Coordinates: 37°01′50″N 76°05′10″W
- Carries: 4 lanes (4 on bridges, 2 in tunnels) of US 13
- Crosses: Chesapeake Bay
- Locale: Virginia Beach and Norfolk, Chesapeake, Portsmouth to Cape Charles, Virginia, U.S.
- Official name: Lucius J. Kellam Jr. Bridge–Tunnel
- Maintained by: Chesapeake Bay Bridge and Tunnel Commission

Characteristics
- Design: Fixed link: low-level trestle, 2 single-tube tunnels connected by artificial islands, truss bridges, high-level trestle
- Total length: 17.6 mi (28.3 km)
- Clearance below: 75 ft (22.9 m) (North Channel); 40 ft (12.2 m) (Fisherman Inlet)

History
- Opened: April 15, 1964; 62 years ago (northbound); April 19, 1999; 27 years ago (southbound)

Statistics
- Toll: Cars $16 (Each direction & off-peak. $21 Peak. Round trip discount available.) E-ZPass

Location
- Interactive map of Chesapeake Bay Bridge – Tunnel

The Chesapeake Bay Bridge–Tunnel (CBBT, officially the Lucius J. Kellam Jr. Bridge–Tunnel) is a 17.6-mile (28.3 km) bridge–tunnel that crosses the mouth of the Chesapeake Bay between Delmarva and Hampton Roads in the U.S. commonwealth of Virginia. It opened in 1964, replacing ferries that had operated since the 1930s. A major project to dualize its bridges was completed in 1999, and in 2017 a similar project was started to dualize one of its tunnels.

With 12 miles (19 km) of bridges and two one-mile-long (1.6 km) tunnels, the CBBT is one of only 15 bridge–tunnel systems in the world and one of three in both Hampton Roads and the United States. It carries US 13, which saves motorists roughly 95 miles (153 km) and 1 1/2 hours on trips between Hampton Roads and the Philadelphia metropolitan area and points north compared with other routes through the Washington–Baltimore metropolitan area. As of January 2021, over 140 million vehicles have crossed the CBBT.

The CBBT was built and is operated by the Chesapeake Bay Bridge and Tunnel District, a political subdivision of the Commonwealth of Virginia governed by the Chesapeake Bay Bridge and Tunnel Commission in cooperation with the Virginia Department of Transportation. Its construction was financed by toll revenue bonds, while operating and maintenance expenses are recovered through tolls. In 2002, a Joint Legislative Audit and Review Commission (JLARC) study commissioned by the Virginia General Assembly concluded that "given the inability of the state to fund future capital requirements of the CBBT, the District and Commission should be retained to operate and maintain the Bridge–Tunnel as a toll facility in perpetuity".

The tunnel sections addressed concerns that a bridge failure across critical shipping lanes would block not only shipping but navy access.

A similarly named Chesapeake Bay Bridge crosses the Chesapeake Bay farther north in Maryland connecting Annapolis and Kent Island.

== History ==
=== Geographic background ===
In December 1606, the Virginia Company of London sent an expedition to North America to establish a settlement in the Colony of Virginia. After sailing across the Atlantic Ocean from England, they reached the New World at the southern edge of the mouth of what is now known as the Chesapeake Bay. They named the two flanking Virginia points of land /capes like gateposts at the entrance to the long extensive estuary after the sons of their king, James I, the southern Cape Henry, for the eldest and presumed heir, Henry Frederick, Prince of Wales, and the northern Cape Charles, for his younger brother, Charles, Duke of York (the future King Charles I). A few weeks later they established their first permanent settlement on the southern, mainland, side of the bay, several miles upstream along the newly named James River at Jamestown on the northern shore on a close-in island for protection, the first permanent settlement in English North America.

Across the bay, the area north of Cape Charles was located along what became known later as the Delmarva Peninsula. As it bordered the Atlantic Ocean to its east, the region became known as Virginia and neighboring Maryland's Eastern Shore. As the entire colony grew, the bay was a formidable transportation obstacle for exchanges with the Virginia mainland on the Western Shore. One of the eight original shires of Virginia, Accomac Shire was established there in 1634, eventually becoming the two counties of modern times, Accomack County in the north and Northampton County to the south. In comparison to mainland regions, commerce and growth was limited by the need to cross the Bay. Consequently, little industrial base grew there, with the oceanfront peninsula staying predominantly rural with small towns and villages oriented towards life on the waters, and most residents made their living by farming and working as watermen, both on the bay (locally known as the "bay side") and in the Atlantic Ocean ("sea side").

=== Ferry system ===
For the first 350 years, ships and ferry systems provided the primary transportation.

From the early 1930s to 1954, the Virginia Ferry Corporation (VFC), a privately owned public service company managed a scheduled vehicular (car, bus, truck) and passenger ferry service between the Virginia Eastern Shore and Princess Anne County (now part of the City of Virginia Beach) on the mainland Western Shore in the South Hampton Roads area. This system, connecting portions of US 13, was known as the Little Creek-Cape Charles Ferry. In 1951, the northern terminus in Delmarva was relocated to a location now within Kiptopeke State Park.

Despite an expanded fleet of large and modern ships by the VFC in the 1940s and early 1950s which were eventually capable of as many as 90 one-way trips each day, the crossing suffered delays due to heavy traffic and inclement weather.

In 1954, the Virginia General Assembly created a political subdivision, the Chesapeake Bay Ferry District and its governing body, the Chesapeake Bay Ferry Commission. The commission was authorized to acquire the private ferry corporation through bond financing, to improve the existing VFC ferry service.

When the CBBT opened, much of the ferry equipment and vessels used by the Little Creek-Cape Charles Ferry VFC service was sold and moved north to be redeployed to start the Cape May–Lewes Ferry across the 17-mile (27 km) mouth of the Delaware Bay between Cape May, New Jersey and Lewes, Delaware. It still serves transit needs, but the number of pleasure trip passengers increased as the coastal beach resorts developed and grew crowded with vacationers in the next decades, partly due to the improved swifter transportation with highway, bridge, and tunnel access in the region of three states.

=== Studying a fixed crossing ===
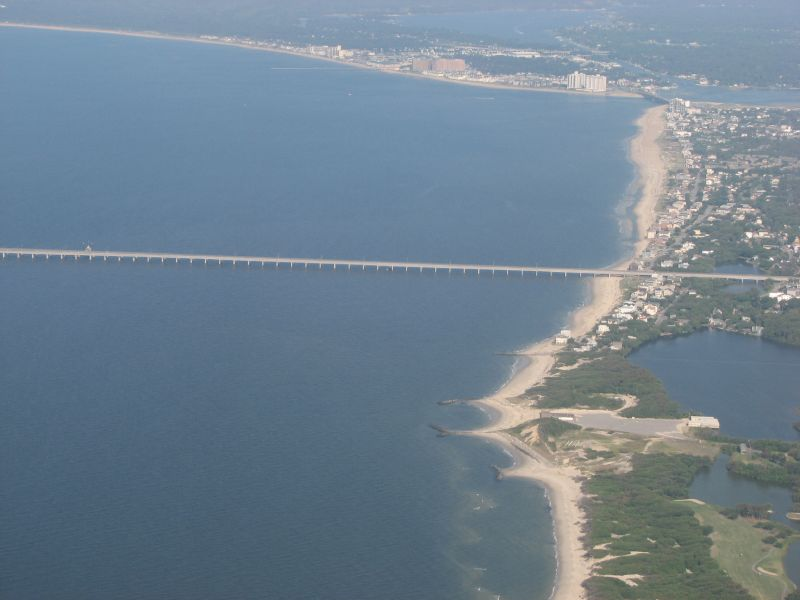
Aerial view of the Virginia Beach entrance to the bridge, facing east

In 1956, the General Assembly authorized the Ferry Commission to conduct feasibility studies for the construction of a fixed crossing. The conclusion of the study indicated that a vehicular crossing was feasible.

Consideration was given to service between the Eastern Shore and both the peninsula and South Hampton Roads. Eventually, the shortest route, extending between the Eastern Shore and a point in Princess Anne County at Chesapeake Beach (east of Little Creek, west of Lynnhaven Inlet), was selected. An option to also provide a fixed crossing link to Hampton and the peninsula was not pursued.

The selected route crosses two Atlantic shipping channels: the Thimble Shoals Channel to Hampton Roads and the Chesapeake Channel to the northern Chesapeake Bay. High-level bridges were initially considered for traversing these channels. The United States Navy objected to bridging the Thimble Shoals Channel because a bridge collapse (possibly by sabotage) could cut Naval Station Norfolk off from the Atlantic Ocean. Maryland officials expressed similar concerns about the Chesapeake Channel and the Port of Baltimore.

To address these concerns, the engineers recommended a series of bridges and tunnels known as a bridge–tunnel, similar in design to the Hampton Roads Bridge–Tunnel, which had been completed in 1957, but on a considerably longer and larger facility. The tunnel portions, anchored by four artificial islands of approximately five acres (2.0 ha) each, would be extended under the two main shipping channels. The CBBT was designed by the engineering firm Sverdrup & Parcel of St. Louis, Missouri.

=== Original construction ===
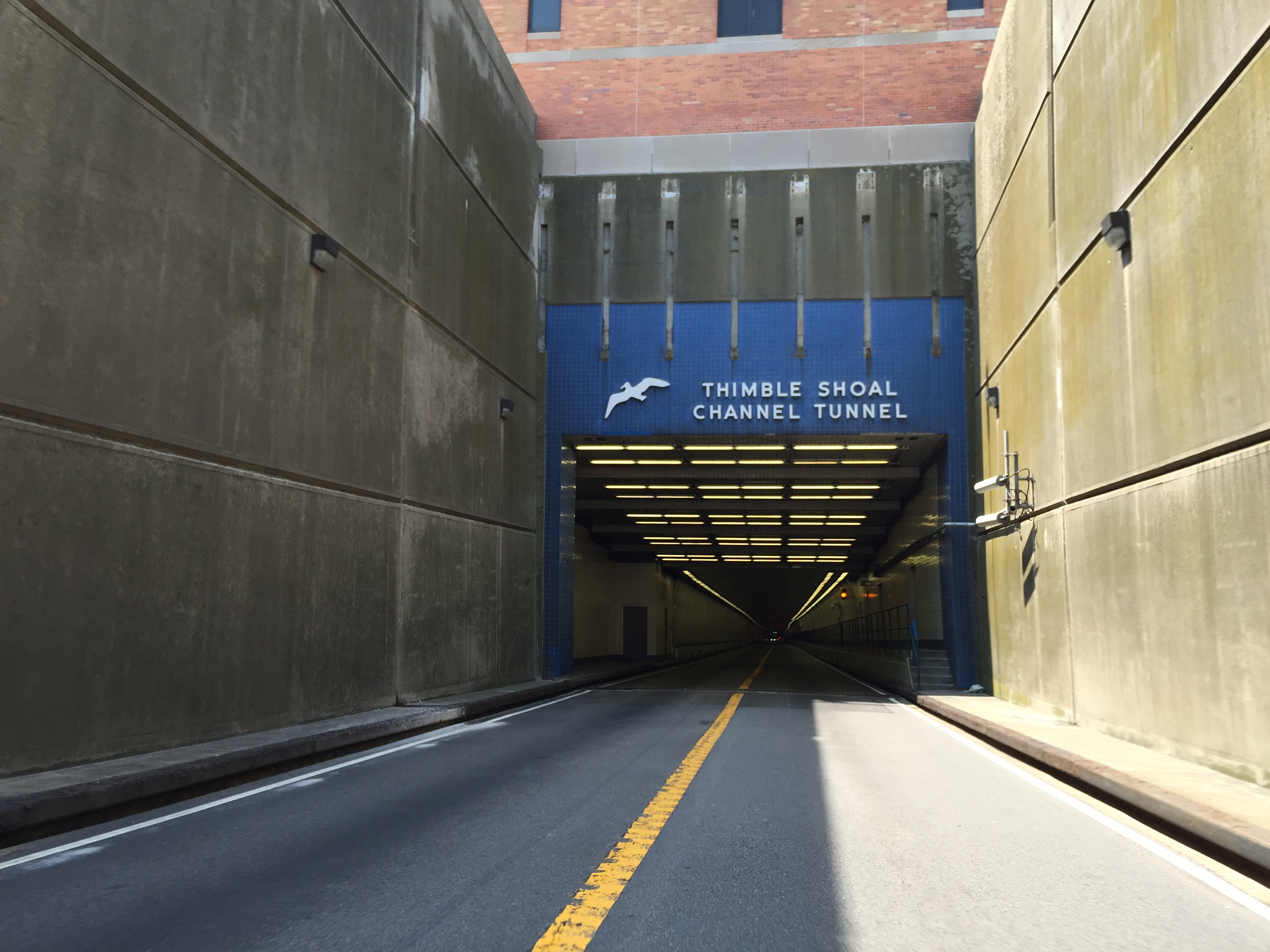
View south entering the Thimble Shoal Channel Tunnel

In mid-1960, the Chesapeake Bay Ferry Commission sold $200 million in toll revenue bonds (equivalent to $1.67 billion in 2025 dollars) to private investors, and the proceeds were used to finance the construction of the bridge–tunnel. Funds collected by future tolls were pledged to pay the principal and interest on the bonds. No local, state, or federal tax funds were used in the construction of the project.

Construction contracts were awarded to a consortium of Tidewater Construction Corporation and Merritt-Chapman & Scott Corporation. The steel superstructure for the high-level bridges near the north end of the crossing were fabricated by the American Bridge Division of United States Steel Corporation. Construction of the bridge–tunnel began in October 1960 after a six-month process of assembling necessary equipment from worldwide sources.

The tunnels were constructed using the technique refined by Ole Singstad with the Baltimore Harbor Tunnel, whereby a large ditch was first dug for each tunnel, into which was lowered pre-fabricated tunnel sections cable-suspended from overhead barges. Interior chambers were filled with water to lower the sections, the sections then aligned, bolted together by divers, the water pumped out, and the tunnels finally covered with earth.

The construction was accomplished under the severe conditions imposed by nor'easters, hurricanes, and the unpredictable Atlantic Ocean. During the Ash Wednesday Storm of 1962, much of the partially completed work and a major piece of custom-built equipment, a pile driver barge called "The Big D", were destroyed. Seven workers were killed at various times during the construction. In April 1964, 42 months after construction began, the Chesapeake Bay Bridge–Tunnel opened to traffic and the ferry service discontinued.

The Ferry Commission and transportation district it oversees, created in 1954, were later renamed for the revised mission of building and operating the Chesapeake Bay Bridge–Tunnel. The CBBT district is a public agency, and it is a legal subdivision of the Commonwealth of Virginia. The bridge–tunnel is supported financially by the tolls collected from the motorists who use the facility.

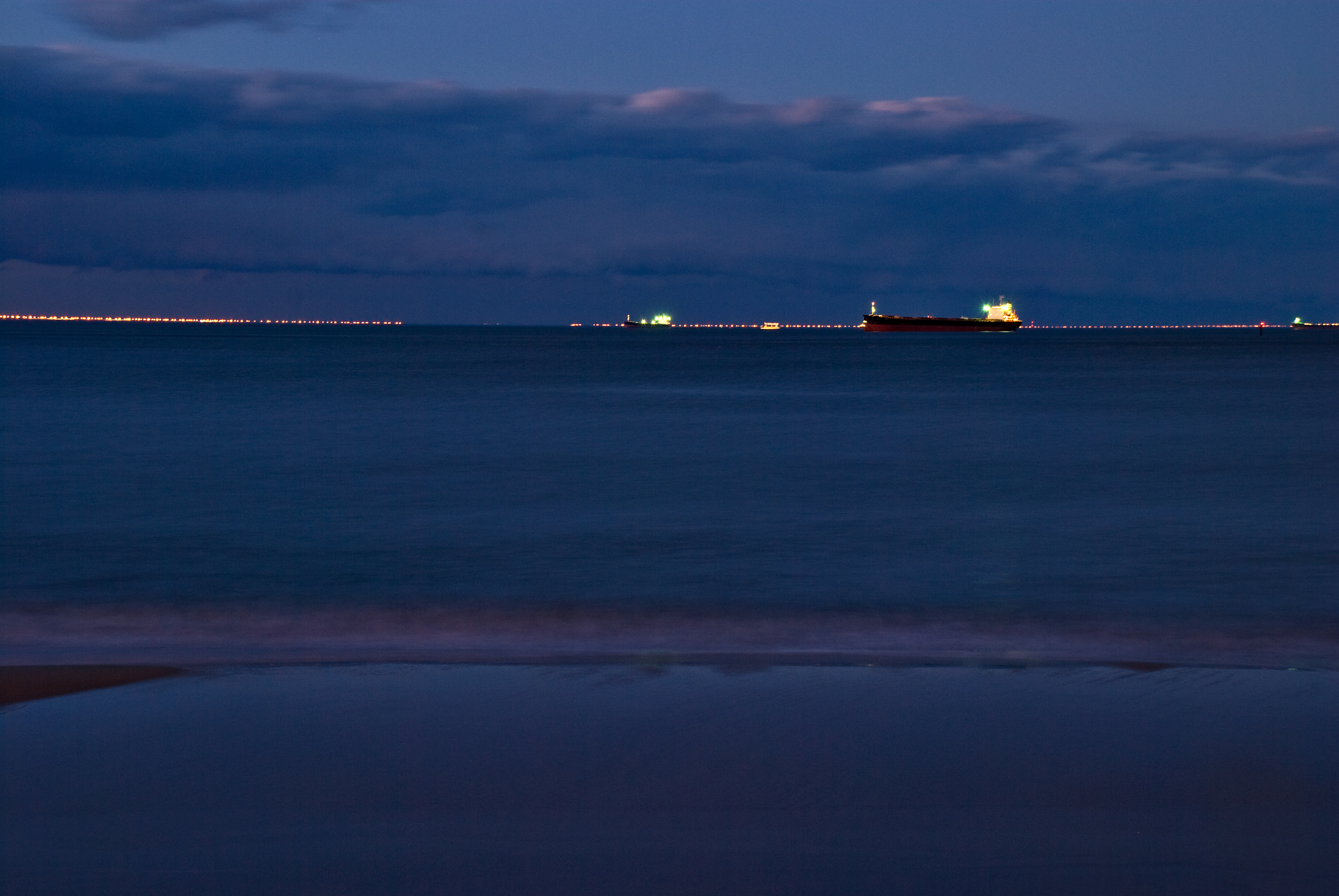
Cargo ships line up to cross the bridge–tunnel complex at night

Eastern Shore native, businessman, and civic leader Lucius J. Kellam Jr. (1911–1995) was the original commission's first chairman. In a commentary at the time of his death in 1995, the Norfolk-based Virginian-Pilot newspaper recalled that Kellam had been involved in bringing the multimillion-dollar bridge–tunnel project from dream to reality.

Before it was built, Kellam handled a political fight over the location, and addressed concerns of the U.S. Navy about prospective hazards to navigation to and from the Norfolk Navy Base at Sewell's Point.

Kellam was also directly involved in the negotiations to finance the ambitious crossing with bonds. According to the newspaper article, "there were not-unfounded fears that (1) storm-driven seas and drifting or off-course vessels could damage, if not destroy, the span and (2) traffic might not be sufficient to service the entire debt in an orderly way. Sure enough, bridge portions of the crossing have occasionally been damaged by vessels, and there was a long period when holders of the riskiest bonds received no interest on their investment."

An icon of eastern Virginia politics, Kellam remained chairman and champion of the CBBT throughout the hard times, and the bondholders were eventually paid as toll revenues caught up with expenses. He continued to serve until he was over 80 years old, finally retiring in 1993. He had held the post for 39 years.

The facility was renamed in Kellam's honor in 1987, over 20 years after it opened.

=== Bridge dualization (1999) ===
Info sign at the rest area with map of new bridge

At a cost of $197 million, new parallel two-lane trestles were built both to alleviate traffic and for safety reasons. Immediately after completion of the parallel trestles, traffic was diverted to them and the original trestles and roadway underwent a $20 million retrofit, repairing the wear and tear of 35 years of service and upgrading certain features, such as repaving the road surface. The older portion of the facility was then reopened on April 19, 1999.

The 1995–1999 project increased the capacity of the above-water portion of the facility to four lanes, added wider shoulders for the new southbound portion, facilitated needed repairs, and provided protection against a total closure should a trestle be struck by a ship or otherwise damaged (which had occurred twice in the past); partially for this reason, the parallel trestles are not located immediately adjacent to each other, reducing the chance that both would be damaged during a single incident.

=== Thimble Shoal Tunnel dualization (projected 2028) ===
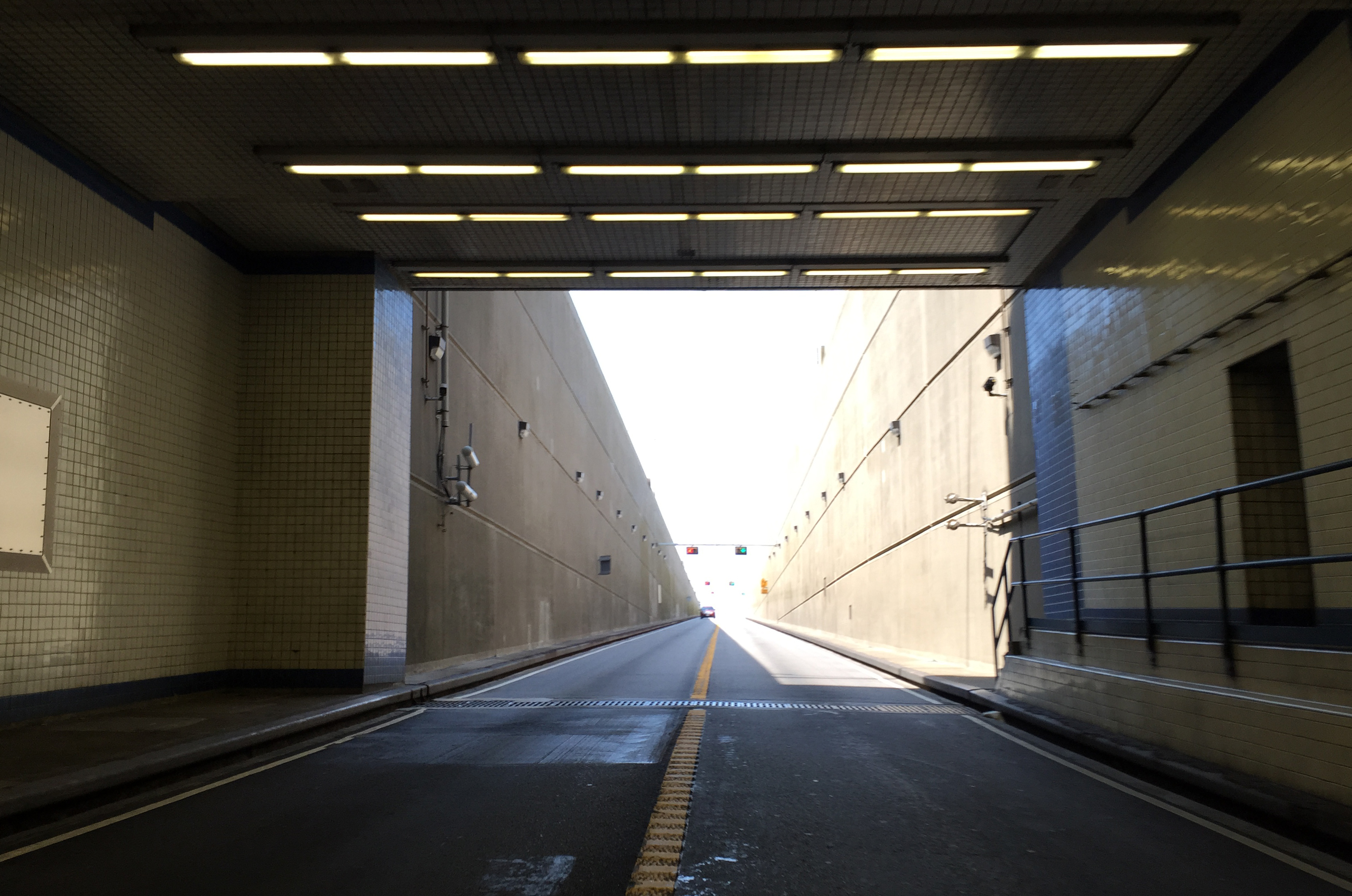
View south exiting the Chesapeake Channel Tunnel

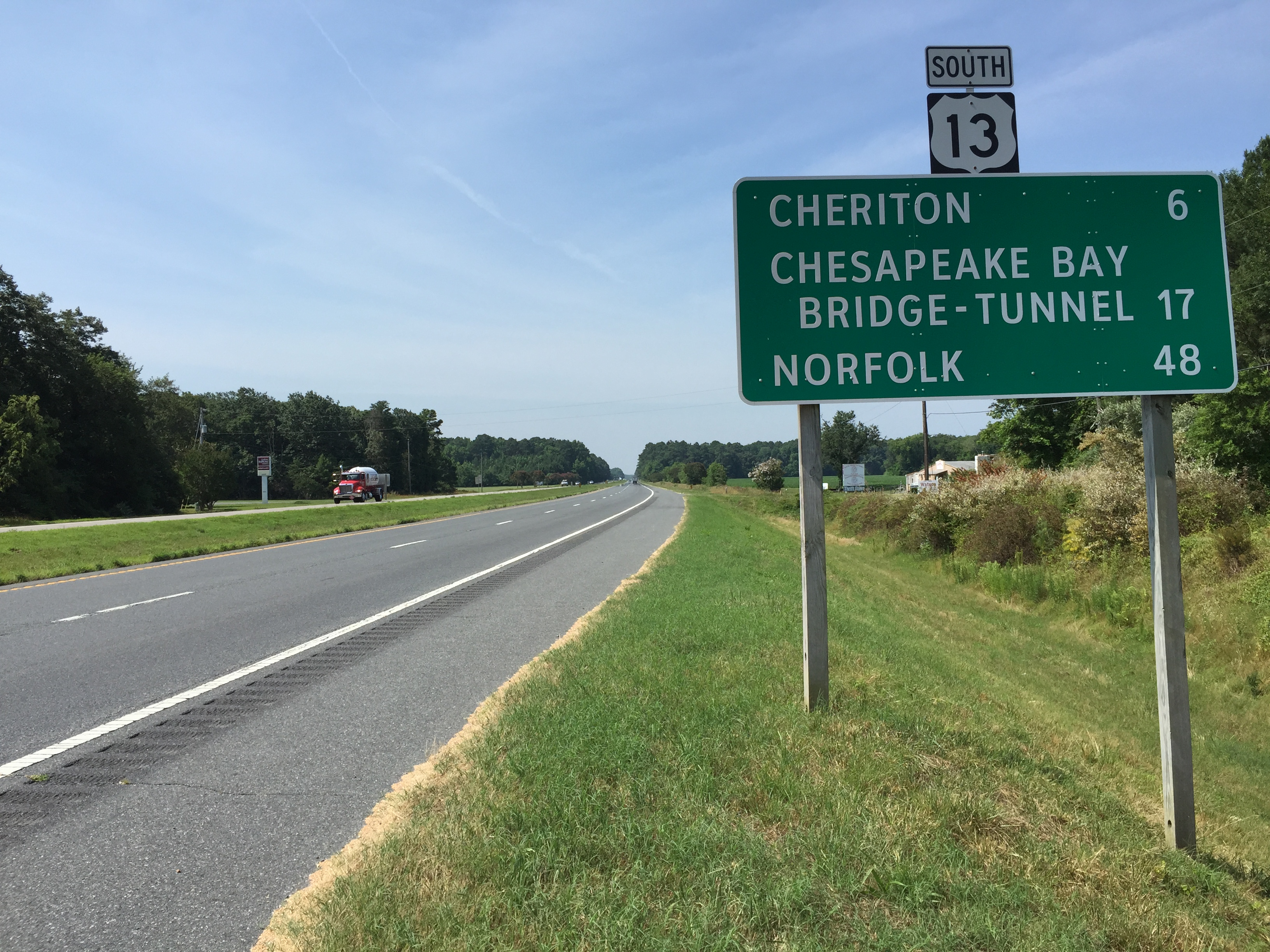
A sign on Route 13 Business in James Crossroads signals distance to the bridge and tunnel.

In 2013, the CBBT Commission approved a project to construct a second tunnel under the Thimble Shoal channel for an estimated cost of $756 million. The project received three bids, all of which would use a tunnel boring machine. The winning company was German-based Herrenknecht, whose machine was 325 ft (99 m) long. The machine, nicknamed Chessie in a naming contest, was capable of moving forward through soil at 2.4 in (61 mm) per minute, or about 50 ft (15 m) per day. At that rate, it was estimated that the tunnel would be dug within about one year. Construction work began in 2017 to prepare the location of the tunnels. The affected pier, shop, and restaurant were closed in September 2017. The machine was built in 2018, after some delays, and was shipped to Virginia. After boring, the machine will also be adding the circular concrete segments which will be delivered into the tunnel via mine cars one at a time. Construction was scheduled to finish in 2023. By August 2022, the second tunnel at Thimble Shoal had been delayed to 2027. As of 2025, now the project has been delayed to 2028.

- Tunnel length: approximately one mile (1.6 km)
- Tunnel diameter:
  - Inner diameter: 39 feet (12 m) (Note: Prior to roadway and support structure installation)
  - Outer diameter: 42 feet (13 m)
- Construction cost: $755,987,318
- Construction method: Bored tunnel
- Construction start (estimate): October 1, 2017
- Construction completion (estimate): 2023
- Maximum tunnel depth
  - Crown—at its deepest location (mid-channel): 105 feet (32 m) below the water surface
  - Invert—from the top of the roadway at its deepest location: 134 feet (41 m) below the surface
- Soil removal: the approximate amount of soil to be removed by the tunnel boring machine (TBM) is 500,000 cubic yards (380,000 m^{3}).
- Concrete sections: The tunnel will consist of approximately 9,000 individual concrete pieces. Approximately 42,000 cubic yards (32,000 m^{3}) of concrete will be needed to make the tunnel sections.

=== Chesapeake Channel Tunnel dualization (projected 2035–2040) ===
At the northern end, a parallel Chesapeake Channel Tunnel will be added to finish the entire length to become a four-lane highway from shore to shore. This project is marked to begin in 2035, which would possibly be open for traffic in 2040, assuming there are no setbacks or delays.

In 2021, the United States Department of Transportation loaned $338.6 million to the Chesapeake Bay Bridge Tunnel District through the Transportation Infrastructure Finance and Innovation Act, with funds provided by the Infrastructure Investment and Jobs Act. The loan would help pay for the construction of both parallel tunnels.

== Operations, maintenance, and regulations ==
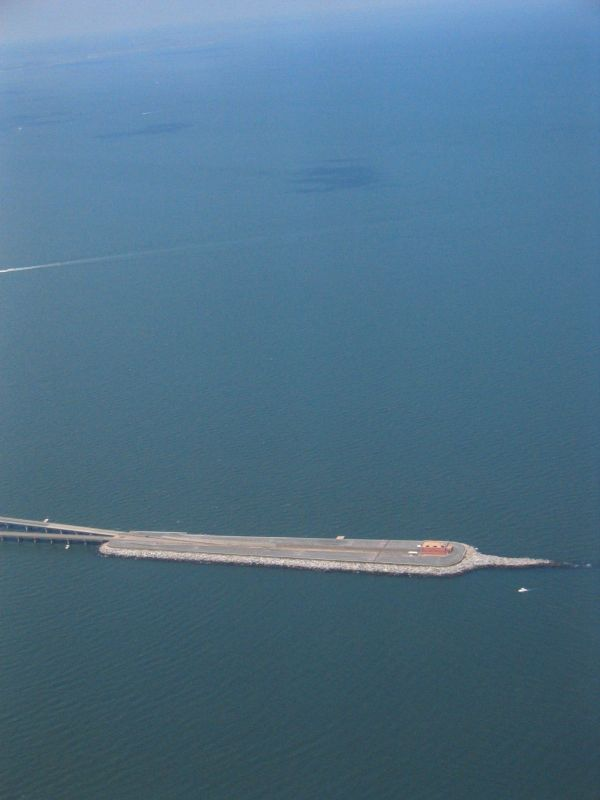
One of the artificial islands making up part of the bridge–tunnel complex, seen from the air

Toll collection facilities are located at both ends of the facility. Tolls are paid in each direction. As of 2024, the toll for cars (without trailers) traveling along the CBBT is $16 for off-peak or $21 for peak times (Friday through Sunday from May 15 to September 15). Should a car make a return trip within 24 hours of the first, the second trip across costs $6/$1 for off peak/peak season, but only when paying with E-ZPass; cash or card payers must pay full fare. Motorcycles pay the same toll as cars without trailers. All other vehicles are charged based on size and purpose and are not subject to the return-trip discount. All tolls must be paid either in cash, debit/credit card, by scrip tickets issued by the CBBT, or E-ZPass. The bridge–tunnel began accepting Smart Tag/E-ZPass payments on November 1, 2007.

All toll lanes, including the E-ZPass-only lanes, are gated for safety concerns and to turn around inadmissible vehicles. For example:

- Strong winds have blown over certain vehicles. Therefore, some vehicles are banned when the wind speed exceeds 40 miles per hour (64 km/h). Level 3 wind restrictions, in place when the wind exceeds 65 miles per hour (105 km/h), ban all traffic.
- Hazardous materials and compressed gas require various restrictions and inspections to safeguard the tunnels.
- Both tunnels have a height limit of 13 feet 6 inches (4.11 m). An over-height truck in April 2007 severely damaged the tunnels. Repairs took three weeks.
- Should police activities, accidents, or closures stop traffic from moving freely, gates prevent drivers from entering and then being forced to either back up within the narrow space or to wait too long in the middle of the bridge–tunnel.

The bridge–tunnel management prohibits bicycles but offers a shuttle van for $15. Cyclists must call ahead.

It is mandatory that the bridge be checked and serviced every five years. Since servicing the bridge takes about five years, the process is a continuous cycle.

The CBBT is the only automobile transportation facility in Virginia with its police department. By original charter from the state, it has authority to enforce the laws of Virginia. Emergency call boxes are spaced at half-mile (0.8 km) intervals.

== Tourism ==
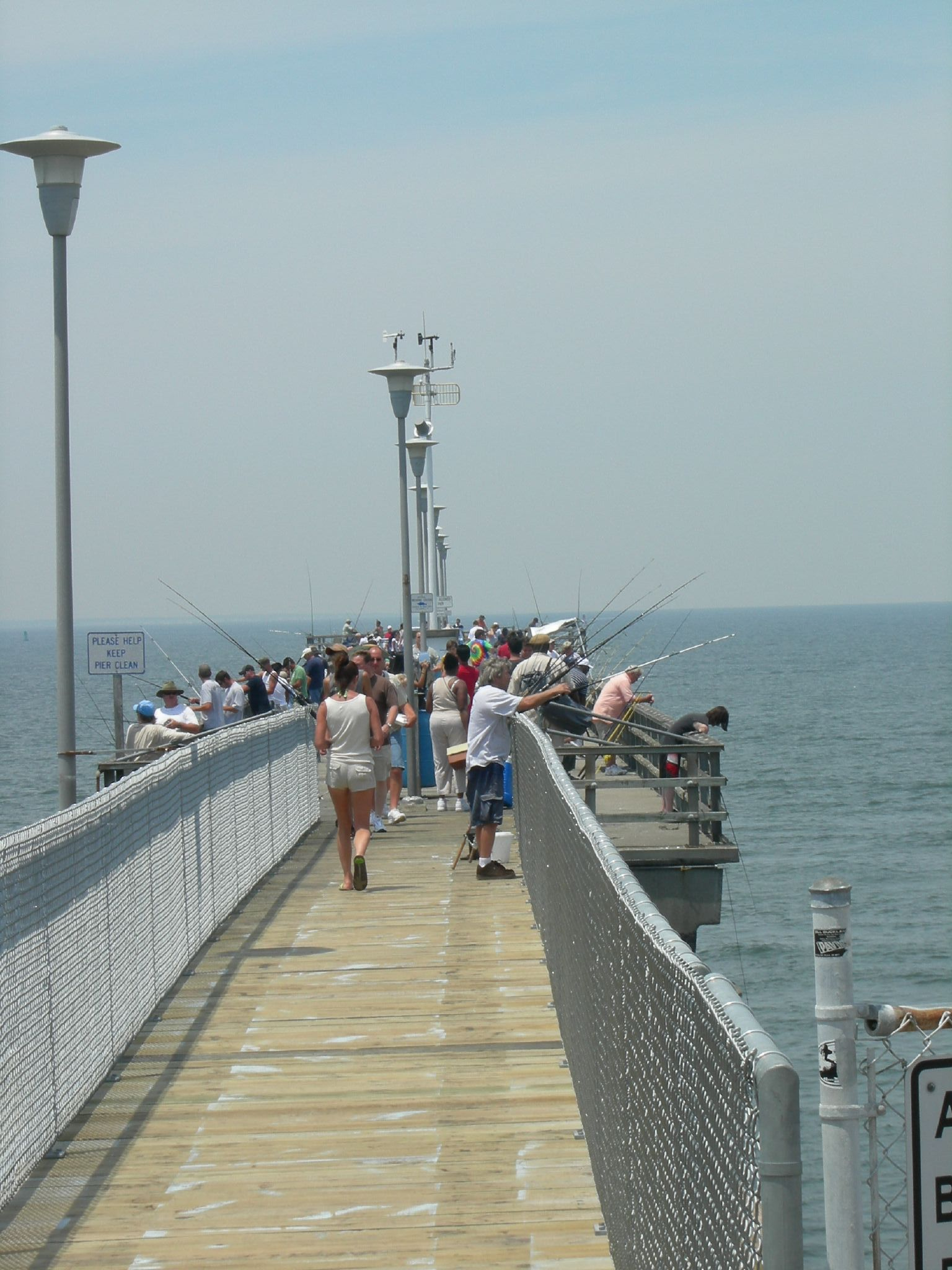
Sea Gull Pier on South Thimble Island, 2007

The CBBT promotes the bridge–tunnel as not only a transportation facility to tourist destinations to the north and south, but as a destination itself. For travelers headed elsewhere, the bridge–tunnel can save more than 90 miles (140 km) of driving for those headed between Ocean City, MD; Rehoboth Beach, DE, Fenwick Island, DE, and Wilmington, DE (and areas north) and the Virginia Beach area or the Outer Banks of North Carolina, according to the CBBT district. Unlike the Interstate Highways that travelers would avoid by taking the bridge–tunnel, the roads in the shortcut have traffic lights.

On the Delmarva peninsula to the north of the bridge, travelers may visit nearby Kiptopeke State Park, Eastern Shore National Wildlife Refuge, Fisherman Island National Wildlife Refuge (closed to the public), Assateague Island National Seashore, NASA's Wallops Flight Facility, campgrounds and other vacation destinations. To the south are tourist destinations around Virginia Beach, including First Landing State Park, Norfolk Botanical Garden, Virginia Beach Maritime Historical Museum, Atlantic Wildfowl Heritage Museum, and the Virginia Aquarium and Maritime Science Center.

A scenic overlook is located at the north end of the bridge and was formerly located at South Thimble Island, near the south end. At South Thimble Island, passing ships may include U.S. Navy warships, nuclear submarines, and aircraft carriers, as well as large cargo vessels and sailing ships. A restaurant and gift shop on the island opened in 1964, along with the 625-foot-long (191 m) Sea Gull Pier. Bluefish, trout, croaker, flounder, and other species have been caught from the pier. Since birds use the habitat created by the bridges and islands of the CBBT, birders have travelled to the bridge–tunnel to see them at South Thimble Island and the scenic overlook at the north end. As part of the Thimble Shoal Channel Tunnel twinning, the building housing the restaurant and gift shop closed and access to the pier was prohibited starting at the end of September 2017. The building will be demolished and not replaced, and the pier will reopen to the public at the end of the project in 2027.

== Dimensions ==
Among the key features of the Chesapeake Bay Bridge–Tunnel are two one-mile (1.6 km) tunnels beneath the Thimble Shoals and Chesapeake navigation channels and two pairs of side-by-side high-level bridges over two other navigation channels: North Channel Bridge (75 ft or 22.9 m clearance) and Fisherman Inlet Bridge (40 ft or 12.2 m clearance). The remaining portion comprises 12 miles (19 km) of low-level trestle, two miles (3.2 km) of causeway, and four artificial islands.

The CBBT is 17.6 miles (28.3 km) long from shore to shore, crossing what is essentially an ocean strait. Including land-approach highways, the overall facility is 23 miles (37 km) long (20 miles [32 km] from toll plaza to toll plaza) and despite its length, there is a height difference of only six inches (150 mm) from the south to north end of the bridge–tunnel.

Artificial islands, each approximately 5.25 acres (2.12 ha) in size, are located at each end of the two tunnels. Between North Channel and Fisherman Inlet, the facility crosses at grade over Fisherman Island, a barrier island that is part of the Eastern Shore of Virginia National Wildlife Refuge administered by the U.S. Fish and Wildlife Service.

The columns that support the CBBT's trestles—called piles—would stretch for about 100 miles (160 km) if placed end-to-end, roughly the distance between New York City and Philadelphia.

== Incidents ==
The CBBT has been closed three times for multiple days after being struck by watercraft:

- In December 1967, coal barge Mohawk broke anchor and struck the bridge, closing it for two weeks for repairs.
- On January 21, 1970, the USS Yancey (AKA-93), a United States Navy attack cargo ship carrying 250 people, was at anchor near the bridge–tunnel. During a gale with winds gusting in excess of 50 miles per hour (80 km/h), the Yancey dragged its anchors and hit the bridge stern first, knocking out a 375-foot (114 m) segment of trestle. There were no vehicles on the bridge at the time of the impact, and no one was injured. During the 42 days it took to replace the damaged span, the Navy offered a free shuttle service for commuters using helicopters and LCUs.
- In 1972, the bridge was again impacted by a barge that had broken loose, closing it for two weeks while the span was repaired.

Other, less significant strikes have caused shorter closures while the affected structures are inspected—most recently, a four hour closure after a barge strike in June 2011.

As of February 2025, there have been 19 incidents of vehicles running off the bridge and into the water. In 2017, a truck plowed through the barriers into the sea below; the driver was rescued but died en route to the hospital. In December 2020, a dairy truck crashed through the guardrail near mile 14. Witnesses saw the driver drifting in the water—estimated to be about 45 °F (7 °C)—but were unable to rescue him. Despite an extensive search, he remained missing until April 2021, when his body washed up over 100 mi (160 km) south at Cape Hatteras National Seashore between Salvo and Avon. A second truck following the dairy truck encountered strong wind gusts just prior to the accident that blew it into the other lane.

== See also ==
- Busan–Geoje Fixed Link
- Hong Kong–Zhuhai–Macau Bridge
- List of bridge–tunnels
- Øresund Bridge
- Tokyo Bay Aqua-Line
