= Southern Tip Bike & Hike Trail =

Rail trail on Virginia's Eastern Shore

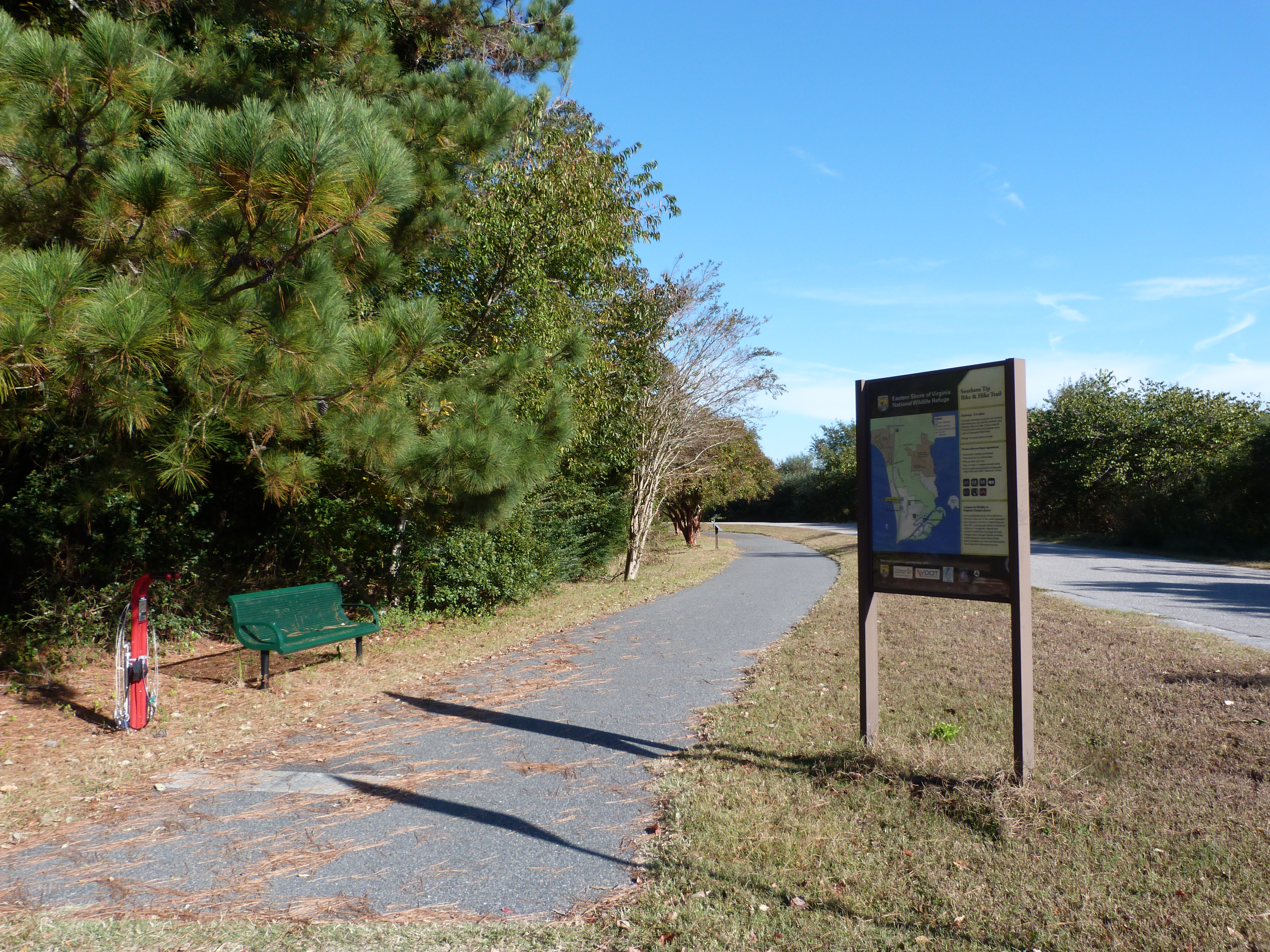
- Southern Tip Bike Trailhead looking north
- Length: 5.0 miles (8.0 km)
- Location: Delmarva Peninsula, Accomack County, Virginia and Northampton County, Virginia
- Established: 2011
- Trailheads: Eastern Shore of Virginia National Wildlife Refuge, Cedar Grove Drive
- Use: Hiking, Biking
- Surface: Asphalt
- Website: www.co.northampton.va.us/visitors/tourism/free_things_to_see_and_do/free_recreation/bikes_and_hikes/southern_tip_bike___hike_trail

The Southern Tip Hike & Bike Trail is a 5.0-mile (8.0 km), shared-use rail trail that runs from Capeville, Virginia, to the Eastern Shore of Virginia National Wildlife Refuge. It was built by the U.S. Fish and Wildlife Service on the abandoned right-of-way of the old Cape Charles Railroad, a subsidiary of the New York, Philadelphia and Norfolk Railroad (NYP&N), which ran from 1910 to 1972. Planned phases would extend the trail all the way to Cape Charles.

== History ==
In 1884, the NYP&N built a rail line to Cape Charles, Virginia. On March 24, 1906, in incorporated the Cape Charles Railroad to build a line south from Cape Charles, and a few years later it began building the rail line from a point just east of Cape Charles, which became known as Cape Junction. They opened the line to Townsend, Virginia, by December 1, 1910, and it opened to Kiptopeke, Virginia, on March 8, 1912. The NYP&N absorbed the Cape Charles Railroad in 1917. The Pennsylvania Railroad, which had purchased a controlling interest in the NYP&N in 1908, took over operations of it in 1920 and in 1930 folded it into its Delmarva Division. in 1941 it was extended south to Fort John Custis. In 1968 NYP&N became part of Penn Central which in 1970 declared bankruptcy.

In 1972, Penn Central abandoned the rail line from Cape Charles to Kitopeke. The Nature Conservancy purchased the abandoned right-of-way in 1985, and the track was removed. The Nature Conservancy later donated part of the easement and land for the trail.

Accomack and Northampton counties started planning a trail on the right-of-way in 2000. In 2004, the Eastern Shore of Virginia bicycle plan, which included the concept of the trail, was approved by both Accomack and Northampton counties and the Northampton County Bicycle Committee was then formed in January 2006 to begin the development of the trail.

Construction of the trail occurred in phases. The first 2.6-mile-long leg from Eastern Shore of Virginia National Wildlife Refuge north to Cedar Grove Drive near Kiptopeke State Park was finished in 2011 and held its grand opening that year on October 21. The second section of the trail, stretching 2.4 miles north from Cedar Grove Drive to Capeview Drive was dedicated on May 17, 2019. The first two sections were funded and constructed by the U.S. Fish and Wildlife Service.

Phase III & IV of the trail will take it into Cape Charles where it will connect with the under-construction Eastern Shore of Virginia Rail Trail.

== Trail route ==
The trail follows the route of the old Cape Charles Railroad, utilizing its right-of way for all but the southernmost few hundred feet. It runs along the east side of Lankford Highway (US 13) through forest and adjacent agricultural fields.

== See also ==
- Eastern Shore of Virginia Rail Trail
