= Virginia Capes =

Entrance to Chesapeake Bay, US East Coast

Coordinates: 37°1′44″N 76°4′5″W

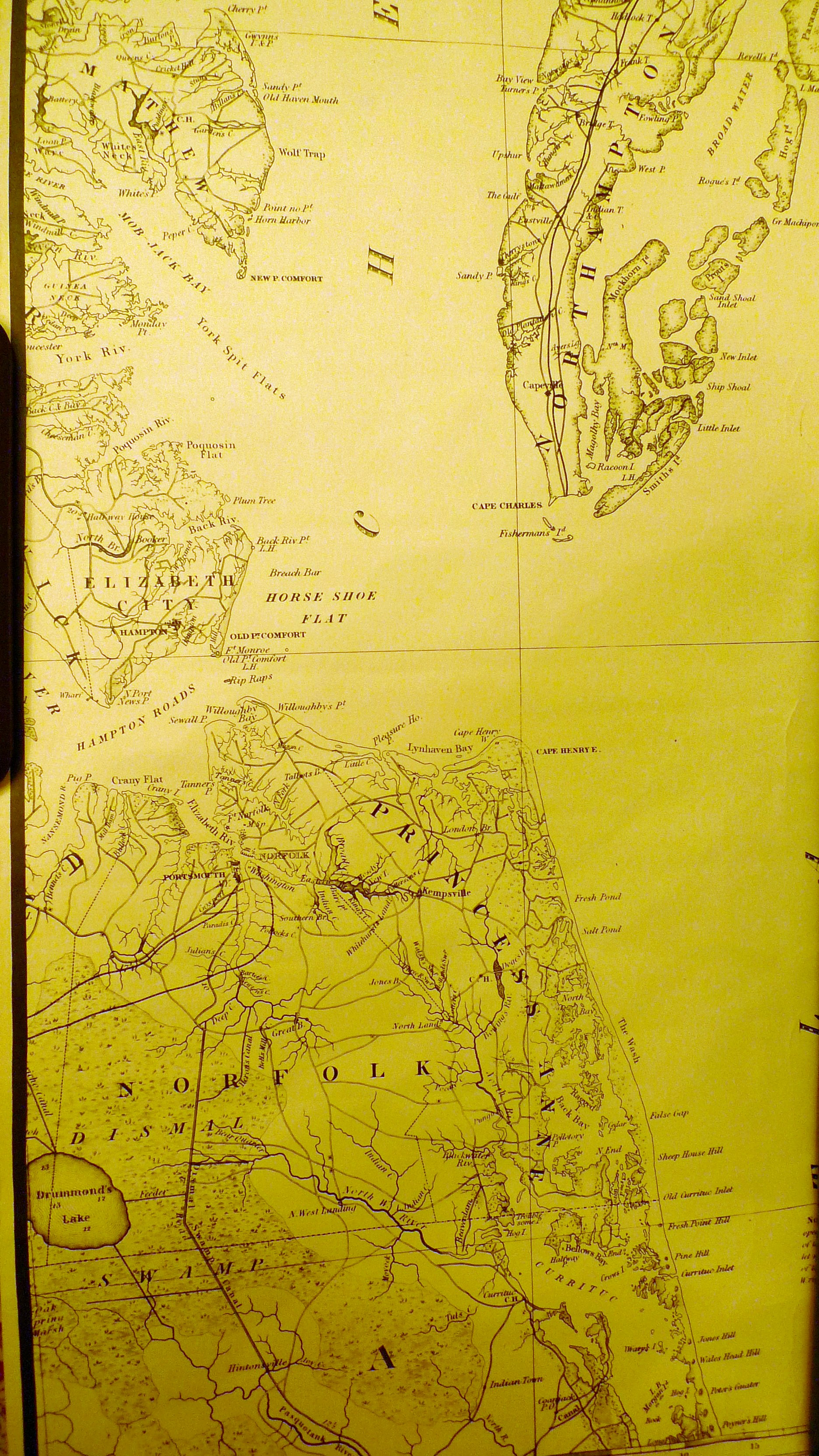
Cape Henry and Cape Charles at the entrance to the Chesapeake Bay

The Virginia Capes are the two capes, Cape Charles to the north and Cape Henry to the south, that define the entrance to the Chesapeake Bay on the eastern coast of North America.

Rear Admiral Montagu writing to the Admiralty in London March 22, 1773 reported the illicit trade, smuggling from Holland between the Capes of Virginia and Boston was far greater than that between the St Lawrence river and Canceaux, Nova Scotia.

The importance of the Chesapeake Bay in American history has long made the Virginia Capes strategically significant, most notably in the naval Battle of the Chesapeake that was crucial to the American victory at the siege of Yorktown, effectively ending the American Revolutionary War. As a result, the area was heavily garrisoned, beginning with the construction of Fort Monroe and Fort Wool in 1819. During the American Civil War, a pivotal battle between the ironclad warships USS Monitor and CSS Virginia was fought in Hampton Roads. The Virginia was attempting to break the Union blockade that was strangling the Confederacy.

During World War I, additional gun batteries were installed on Cape Henry at Fort Story and on Fisherman's Island near Cape Charles. During World War II, the coast artillery batteries at Fort Story were expanded and additional batteries were installed at Fort John Custis on Cape Charles to guard the entrance to Hampton Roads Harbor.

More recently, because of the close proximity of many military installations, including Naval Station Norfolk, Joint Base Langley-Eustis, Joint Expeditionary Base Little Creek–Fort Story, NAS Oceana, the Norfolk Naval Shipyard, and Newport News Shipbuilding, the Capes area has often been used for the initial trials of new Navy ships and for military training exercises.
