= J. Clyde Morris =

American civic leader (1909–1987)

James Clyde Morris (July 4, 1909 – September 21, 1987) was an American civic leader in the Hampton Roads region of southeastern Virginia. His career spanned 32 years of public service.

Morris served as the only city manager of the short-lived City of Warwick in the Virginia Peninsula subregion from 1952 to 1958. This was an important and change-filled period for the former Warwick County, one of the original shires of Virginia originally established in 1634. In 1952, Warwick made the transition to become an independent city. Then, in 1958, it was consolidated with neighboring City of Newport News, which had become separate from the county after development of the coal piers and the eastern terminus of the Chesapeake and Ohio Railway and the massive facilities of the Newport News Shipbuilding and Dry Dock Company by developer and industrialist Collis P. Huntington.

Morris next undertook leadership of the entities which funded, built and operate the Chesapeake Bay Bridge-Tunnel, completed in 1964. He was the first executive director of the Chesapeake Bay Bridge and Tunnel District. He was also a member of the Hampton Roads Sanitation District Commission for 32 years.

In Newport News, a stretch of U.S. Route 17 from the York County border (to where it turns left onto Jefferson Avenue) then straight through to Warwick Boulevard was named J. Clyde Morris Boulevard in his honor by the Warwick City Council in 1958.
