= Fisherman Island (Virginia) =

Island in Virginia, United States of America

Fisherman Island National Wildlife Refuge
- IUCN category IV (habitat/species management area)
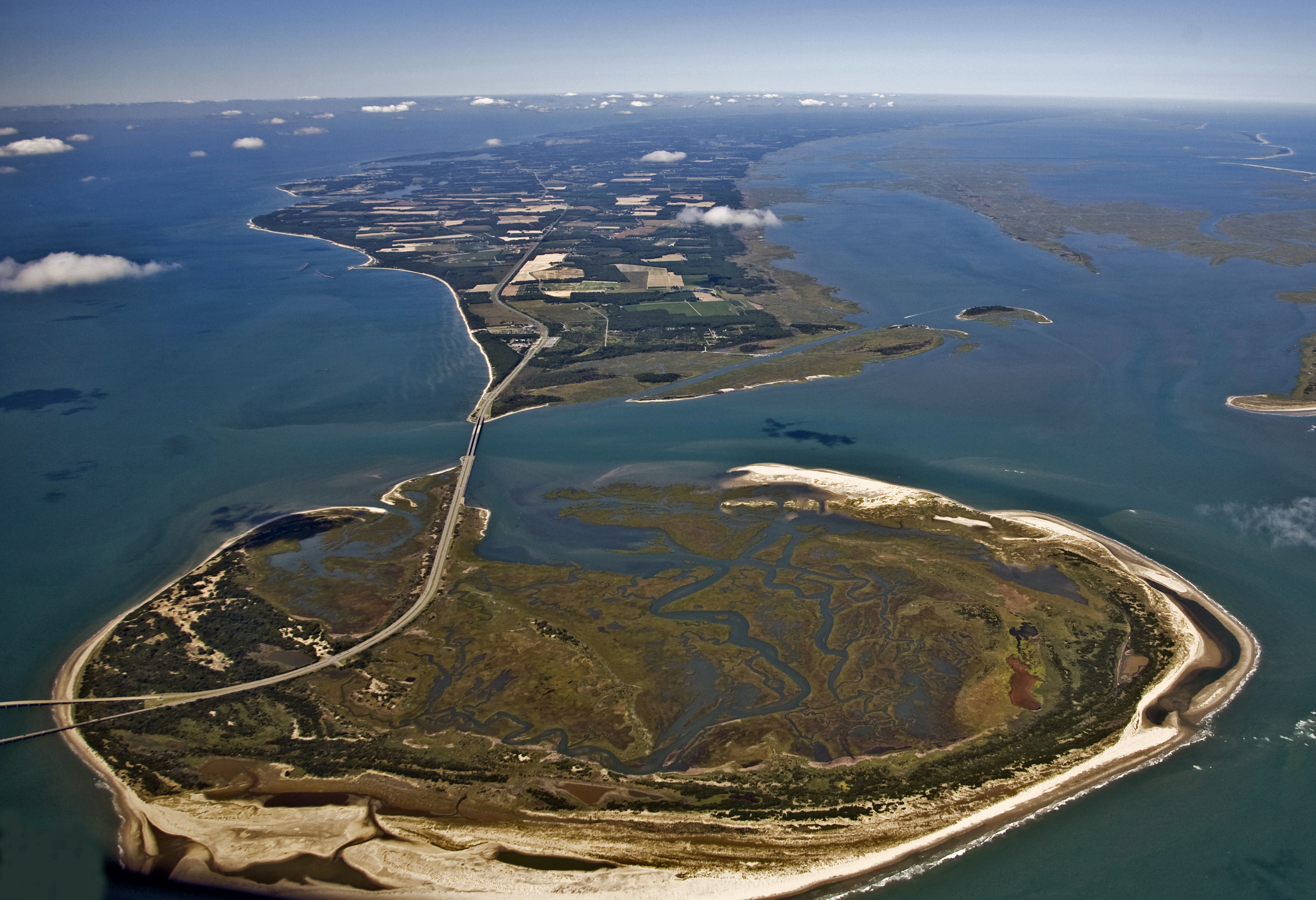

- Location within Virginia Location within the United States
- Location: Northampton County, Virginia, United States
- Nearest city: Cheriton, Virginia / Virginia Beach, Virginia
- Coordinates: 37.09597°N 75.95798°W
- Area: 1,850 acres (7.5 km^{2})
- Established: 1973
- Governing body: U.S. Fish and Wildlife Service
- Website: Fisherman Island National Wildlife Refuge

Fisherman Island is the southernmost island on the Delmarva Peninsula chain of barrier islands. Located at the entrance to the Chesapeake Bay, the island is subject to great changes in its landscape from waves and runoff. It first formed about 200 to 250 years ago.

Gun batteries were emplaced on the island to defend Chesapeake Bay in both world wars; these were part of Fort John Custis during World War II. The US Navy used Fisherman Island from 1949 to 1969.

Fisherman Island National Wildlife Refuge is located near the United States Fish and Wildlife Service's Eastern Shore of Virginia National Wildlife Refuge, and is cut in half by the presence of U.S. Highway 13 and the Chesapeake Bay Bridge Tunnel. The refuge is closed to the public.

The island is the habitat to migratory waterfowl, shorebirds, and nesting waterbirds. In September 2003, the island was almost entirely flooded by Hurricane Isabel.
