= Chesapeake Bay Bridge and Tunnel District =

Political subdivision of Virginia

The Chesapeake Bay Bridge and Tunnel District is a political subdivision of the Commonwealth of Virginia. It is overseen by the Chesapeake Bay Bridge and Tunnel Commission, and operates the Chesapeake Bay Bridge-Tunnel between the Hampton Roads and Eastern Shore regions of the state. The District comprises six cities, Virginia Beach, Norfolk, Portsmouth, Chesapeake, Hampton, Newport News, and the two Eastern Shore counties of Northampton and Accomack.

== History ==
By the early 20th century, the Chesapeake Bay was becoming an increasing transportation obstacle for the growing number of motor vehicles. The Pennsylvania Railroad operated some passenger and railroad car ferry services between the Eastern Shore and Old Point Comfort on the Virginia Peninsula and Norfolk in South Hampton Roads. The Little Creek Ferry operated between the Eastern Shore and Princess Anne County and transported vehicles as part of U.S. Route 13 and the Ocean Highway.

In 1953, the Pennsylvania Railroad announced an end to the service to Old Point Comfort. Worse yet, despite adding more ships, and making as many as 90 one-way crossings a day, the Little Creek Ferry was also proving inadequate. A fixed crossing had long been desired, but was not feasible due to the risk of blocking access to the U.S. Navy's extensive facilities in Hampton Roads. The shortest possible crossing would be approximately 15 miles, far too long for a tunnel such as the Downtown Tunnel across the Elizabeth River which was completed in 1952.

Responding to the problem, in 1954, the Virginia General Assembly created the Chesapeake Bay Ferry District and the Chesapeake Bay Ferry Commission to oversee it. The agency set about the matters of improving bay ferry service and exploring the possibilities of building a fixed crossing. Toll revenue bonds were sold and most of the funds used to purchase the Virginia Ferry Corporation, a public service company which was the operator of the Little Creek Ferry Service. A portion of the funds were designated for a study of a fixed crossing.

A bridge across the Bay was unacceptable to the Navy, and a long tunnel was also considered infeasible. The answer, however, lay close at hand. A similar situation had earlier confronted the crossing of Hampton Roads between Old Point Comfort and South Hampton Roads, and a solution found in a combination of bridge and tunnel which came to be known as a bridge-tunnel. In 1957, the Hampton Roads Bridge-Tunnel was completed, using bridges on each end, and a tunnel under the shipping channel. It was necessary to build artificial islands to anchor the ends of the tunnel, and it was costly to construct, but the design met all the various requirements.

In the late 1950s, an engineering feasibility study of using a combination of bridges and tunnels was performed under the direction of civil engineer Leif J. Sverdrup and his company. Ultimately, a 23 mile-long project, with 17.4 miles of bridge and tunnel construction, was planned. The names of the District and Commission were changed to reflect the new primary mission.

$200 million in toll revenue bonds were sold in August 1960, and construction began the following month. The new bridge-tunnel opened in 1964 as a two lane facility. The Little Creek Ferry service was discontinued, with most ships sold to service the Cape May–Lewes Ferry across the Delaware Bay between Cape May, New Jersey and Lewes, Delaware.

=== Lucius J. Kellam Jr. ===
Eastern Shore native, businessman, and civic leader Lucius J. Kellam Jr. was the original Commission's first chairman. In a commentary at the time of his death in 1995, the Virginian-Pilot newspaper (Norfolk) recalled that Kellam had been involved in bringing the multi-million-dollar bridge-tunnel project from dream to reality.

Before it was built, Kellam handled a political fight over the location, and addressed concerns of the U.S. Navy about prospective hazards to navigation to and from the Norfolk Navy Base at Sewell's Point.

Kellam was also directly involved in the negotiations to finance the ambitious crossing with bonds. According to the newspaper article, "there were not-unfounded fears that (1) storm-driven seas and drifting or off-course vessels could damage, if not destroy, the span and (2) traffic might not be sufficient to service the entire debt in an orderly way. Sure enough, bridge portions of the crossing have occasionally been damaged by vessels, and there was a long period when holders of the riskiest bonds received no interest on their investment."

=== J. Clyde Morris ===
The first executive director of the CBBT was J. Clyde Morris, who had previously served as the Manager of Warwick County, which had become an independent city in 1952 and merged with Newport News in 1958. A stretch of highway in Newport News is named for him.

=== Adding additional lanes ===
At a cost of $197 million, new parallel two-lane trestles were built both to alleviate traffic and for safety reasons, opening on April 19, 1999. This increased the capacity of the above-water portion of the facility to four lanes, facilitated needed repairs, and helped insure against a total closure should a trestle be struck by a ship or otherwise damaged (which had occurred twice in the past).

In 2013, the Commission approved a resolution for the acceleration of the construction of a parallel tunnel at Thimble Shoal Channel. A Design-build team was selected to begin the design of a new parallel tunnel at the southern (Thimble Shoals Channel) crossing. Phase II of the project, involving the construction of the new parallel tunnel, was awarded in 2016 at a cost of $756,987,318. A groundbreaking ceremony for the new parallel tunnel was held in October of 2017. The new tunnel is being constructed using a tunnel boring machine nicknamed "Chessie". Boring operations began in February of 2023, but were quickly halted after only 700 feet when the machine encountered an old anchor in the sea floor. Boring operations were suspended until inspections and repairs could be made to the machine, which involved replacing 389 of the 442 tools on the tunnel boring machine cutterhead. On April 8, 2024, boring operations recommenced and were progressing at an average of 50 feet per day. The current projected project completion date is late summer 2027.

=== Controversy ===
In the early 21st century, the Commission came under increased public scrutiny. Benefits and travel expenses of members reported by a local newspaper appeared wasteful. The need for additional tunnel construction was also questioned by state and local officials, who compared the CBBT's light traffic count to the heavy burdens and congestion on other water-crossings in the Hampton Roads area. The growing funds from increased CBBT tolls in anticipation of the future tunnel expansion were also considered for possible redirection to other projects. In the 2006 General Assembly, legislation was proposed to limit the power of the agency and/or combine its efforts and resources with other area needs.
