= Cape Charles Air Force Station =

Former US Air Force radar station

Cape Charles Air Force Station
- Part of Air Defense Command (ADC)
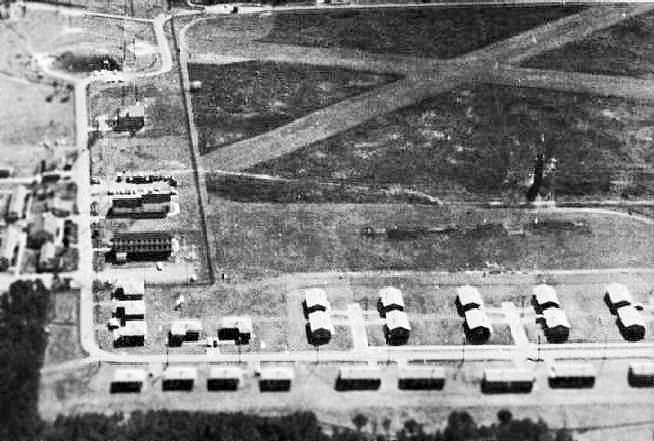
- 1958 oblique airphoto looking west

Site information
- Type: Air Force Station
- Code: ADC ID: P-56, NORAD ID: Z-56
- Controlled by: U.S. Air Force 1948–1981; United States Fish and Wildlife Service 1981–present
- Condition: mostly demolished

Location
- Location of Cape Charles AFS, Virginia
- Coordinates: 37°07′58″N 075°57′11″W

Site history
- Built: 1950
- Built by: United States Army Corps of Engineers
- In use: 1950-1981
- Demolished: 1980s

Garrison information
- Garrison: 771st Aircraft Control and Warning Squadron

Fort John Custis
- Part of Harbor Defenses of Chesapeake Bay
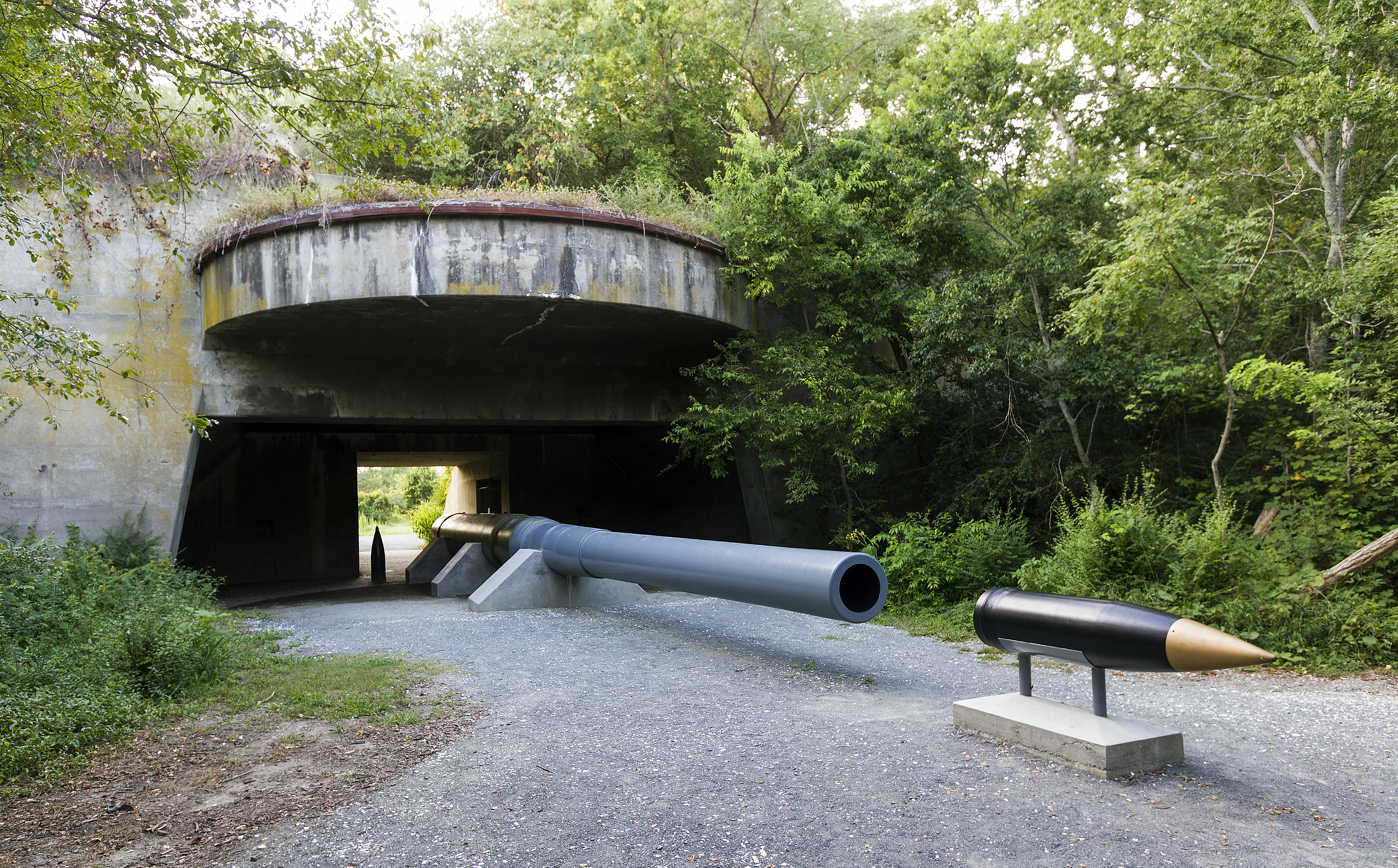
- 16"/50 caliber Mark 7 naval gun and projectile at Battery Winslow

Site information
- Controlled by: U.S. Army 1941–1948; U.S. Air Force 1948–1981; United States Fish and Wildlife Service 1981–present
- Condition: partly demolished, 16-inch gun battery remains

Site history
- Built: 1941
- Built by: United States Army Corps of Engineers
- In use: 1941–1948
- Battles/wars: World War II

Garrison information
- Garrison: 2nd Coast Artillery Regiment; 246th Coast Artillery Regiment; 1st Battalion, 52nd Coast Artillery Regiment (later 286th Coast Artillery (Railway) Battalion)

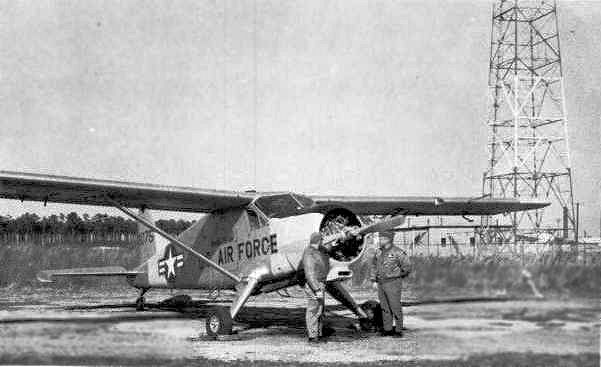
DeHavilland U-1 Beaver at Cape Charles AFS

Cape Charles Air Force Station is a closed United States Air Force General Surveillance Radar station. It is located 3.6 miles (5.8 km) south of Townsend, Virginia. It was closed in 1981. From 1941 to 1948 it was Fort John Custis of the United States Army Coast Artillery Corps. Since 1984 the site has been in the Eastern Shore of Virginia National Wildlife Refuge. For this article's purposes the term "Fort John Custis" includes the nearby Fisherman Island.

== History ==
=== World War I ===
After the American entry into World War I in April 1917, two "emergency batteries" were deployed on Fisherman Island. Two 5-inch (127 mm) M1900 guns came from Battery Ritchie at Fort DuPont, Delaware; the source of the other pair of guns is less clear, and some references list them as 6-inch (152 mm) M1900 guns. With the war over, both batteries were dismantled in 1919. All types of Coast Artillery 5-inch guns were removed from service by 1920; the fate of the possible 6-inch guns is unclear.

=== World War II coastal defense installation ===
The military history of this station resumed in 1941 when the United States Army established Fort Winslow at this location as a coastal defense artillery installation. It complemented Fort Story on Cape Henry to defend the Chesapeake Bay as part of the Harbor Defenses of Chesapeake Bay (HD Chesapeake). The post was briefly renamed Fort Custis, but it was soon realized this could create confusion with Fort Eustis in Newport News, Virginia, and in October 1942 it was renamed Fort John Custis. It was named for John Parke Custis, son of Martha Washington and an officer in the Revolutionary War.

Shortly after the base was established construction began on Battery 122, later named Battery Winslow. This was for two casemated 16-inch (406 mm) ex-Navy guns, eventually creating a crossfire with two similar batteries at Fort Story. Battery 123, another 16-inch battery, was proposed but never built. Following the American entry into World War II a four-gun battery of 155 mm (6.1 in) guns was deployed on Fisherman Island; circular concrete "Panama mounts" were built to improve their firing positions. This was a stopgap until two 6-inch (152 mm) gun batteries were completed at the fort in 1943. A mine casemate for a controlled underwater mine field was built on Fisherman Island. The 1st Battalion, 52nd Coast Artillery (CA) Regiment arrived at Fort John Custis on 27 August 1942, armed with eight 8-inch (203 mm) ex-Navy railway guns. On 5 April 1943 this battalion was redesignated as the 286th CA (Rwy) Battalion.

At least ten fire control towers were built on the Eastern Shore to support the fort. Three still stand on Smith Island near the Cape Charles Lighthouse and another two were on Mockhorn Island. One was on the mainland fort property and three were at Wise Point. Another was in Cheapside, Virginia, north of what is now Kiptopeke State Park.

The batteries on the mainland at Fort John Custis during World War II were as follows:

Name	No. of guns	Gun type	Carriage type	Years active	Condition in 2015
Winslow (Battery 122)	2	16-inch (406 mm) Navy MkIIMI gun	barbette M4	1943–1948	Intact, 16-inch Mark 7 gun on site
Battery A, 286th CA Bn	4	8-inch (203 mm) Navy MkVIM3A2 gun	railway M1A1	1942–1944	demolished
Battery B, 286th CA Bn	4	8-inch (203 mm) Navy MkVIM3A2 gun	railway M1A1	1942–1944	demolished
Battery 228	2	Not armed, slated for 6-inch (152 mm) gun T2-M1	shielded barbette M4	1943–NA	Buried

The batteries on Fisherman Island during World War II were as follows:

Name	No. of guns	Gun type	Carriage type	Years active	Condition in 2015
Battery 227	2	6-inch (152 mm) gun M1905	shielded barbette M1	1943–1965	Guns to Fort Pickens, Florida, intact
Anti-Motor Torpedo Boat (AMTB) 20	2	3-inch (76 mm) gun M1902	pedestal M1902	1942–1944	Guns from Battery Lee, Fort Wool, partly buried
AMTB 24	4	90 mm (3.54 in) gun	two fixed T3/M3, two mobile	1943–1946	
Battery 155	4	155 mm (6.1 in) gun	Panama mounts	1942–194?	

From 1940 through October 1944, HD Chesapeake was garrisoned by the 2nd Coast Artillery Regiment of the regular army, with the 246th Coast Artillery Regiment as the Virginia National Guard component, plus the railway units already mentioned.

On 30 August 1944 the 286th Coast Artillery Battalion (Railway) and its railway guns were withdrawn from the fort. On 20 April 1944 most of the 246th Coast Artillery Regiment was inactivated, with the remainder transferred to HD Beaufort, North Carolina. On 1 October 1944 the 2nd Coast Artillery Regiment was reorganized as the 2nd and 175th Coast Artillery Battalions. On 1 April 1945 those battalions were reorganized as elements of HD Chesapeake Bay.

After the end of World War II the army scrapped almost all of its coast defense guns, including all but two of those at Fort John Custis, and inactivated the fort. The US Navy used Fisherman Island from 1949 to 1969. Two 6-inch M1905 guns remained at Battery 227 until 1976, when they were transferred to Fort Pickens, Florida, where they remain on display.

=== Cold War radar installation ===
The United States Air Force acquired the Fort Custis site from the army in 1948 as a temporary Lashup radar site, being designated L-15 and initially called Fort Custis. It installed AN/CPS-5 and AN/CPS-4 radars when the air force authorized the Air Defense Command to put thirteen radar stations in operation in the northeastern United States. This temporary system was named Lashup to distinguish it from the Interim Program for which the air force was seeking appropriations. The 771st Aircraft Control and Warning Squadron was activated to operate the site. A small airfield was established near the station, to provide logistical support due to its isolated location at the southern end of the Delmarva Peninsula.

L-15 was upgraded in 1952 and redesignated as Cape Charles Air Force Station in December 1953, and was one of twenty-eight stations built as part of the second segment of the permanent radar network, called the Priority Permanent System. Prompted by the start of the Korean War, on 11 July 1950 the Secretary of the Air Force asked the Secretary of Defense for approval to expedite construction of the permanent network. Receiving the Defense Secretary’s approval on 21 July, the air force directed the Corps of Engineers to proceed with construction. Because of difficulties with the new radar equipment, the Fort Custis station initially reused the radar equipment from the former Lashup site to expedite operational status. Thus it was redesignated as LP-56. The 771st AC&W Squadron continued operating the AN/CPS-4 and as of April 1952 an AN/FPS-3 radar as well. The AN/FPS-3 remained operational until 1962. Initially the station functioned as a ground-control intercept (GCI) and warning station. As a GCI station, the squadron's role was to guide interceptor aircraft toward intruders picked up on the unit's radar.

In 1955 an AN/FPS-8 was installed, converted to an AN/GPS-3, and operated through 1958. By the end of that year, two AN/FPS-6 heightfinder radars were activated. During 1959 Cape Charles AFS joined the Semi Automatic Ground Environment (SAGE) system, initially feeding data to DC-04 at Fort Lee AFS, Virginia. After joining, the squadron was re-designated as the 771st Radar Squadron (SAGE) on 1 October 1959. The radar squadron provided information 24/7 to the SAGE Direction Center where it was analyzed to determine range, direction, altitude, speed, and whether the aircraft were friendly or hostile. On 31 July 1963, the site was redesignated as NORAD ID Z-56.

In addition to the main facility, Cape Charles AFS operated several unmanned AN/FPS-14 Gap Filler sites:

- Temperanceville, VA (P-56A/Z-56A): 37°51′38″N 075°33′28″W
- Bethany Beach, DE (P-56B/Z-56B): 38°31′35″N 075°06′26″W
- Elizabeth City, NC (P-56C/Z-56C): 36°14′46″N 076°15′20″W

In 1963 the site hosted AN/FPS-7, AN/FPS-6, and AN/FPS-26A radars. In 1963 the site also became an ADC/FAA joint-use facility. The facility came under Tactical Air Command jurisdiction in 1979 with the inactivation of Aerospace Defense Command and the activation of ADTAC. Air Force use ended in 1981 and Cape Charles AFS was replaced by the Naval Air Station Oceana, Virginia, Joint Surveillance System (JSS) radar site.

== Present ==
Today, the former Cape Charles Air Force Station has mostly been demolished, and is now part of the Eastern Shore of Virginia National Wildlife Refuge, although a few minor service buildings remain. The housing area remains and the units are now in private hands. The Gap Filler support buildings at Z-56A (Temperanceville, VA) and Z-56C (Elizabeth City, NC) remain, although the tower and radar are gone. Z-56B (Bethany Beach, DE) is now part of a golf course. One fire control tower from Fort John Custis remains near the former runway; another remains north of Kiptopeke State Park. A 16"/50 caliber Mark 7 gun and a projectile from an Iowa-class battleship have been placed at Battery Winslow.

== Air Force Units and Assignments ==
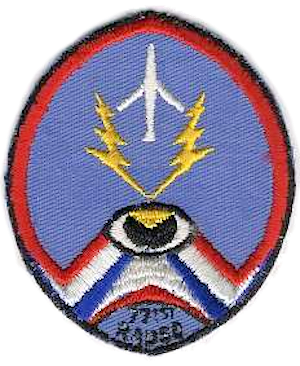
Emblem of the 771st Radar Squadron

=== Units ===
- Constituted as the 771st Aircraft Control and Warning Squadron on 14 November 1950

Activated on 27 November 1950
Redesignated as the 771st Radar Squadron (SAGE) on 1 October 1959
Redesignated as the 771st Radar Squadron on 1 February 1974
Inactivated 30 September 1981

=== Assignments ===
- 503d Aircraft Control and Warning Group, 27 November 1950
- 26th Air Division, 6 February 1952
- 4710th Defense Wing, 16 February 1953
- 85th Air Division, 1 March 1956
- Washington Air Defense Sector, 1 September 1958
- 33d Air Division, 1 April 1966
- 20th Air Division, 19 November 1969 – 30 September 1981

== See also ==
- Seacoast defense in the United States
- United States Army Coast Artillery Corps
- Harbor Defense Command
- List of coastal fortifications of the United States
