= Cape Charles (headland) =

Headland in Virginia, United States

Coordinates: 37°08′57″N 75°57′28″W

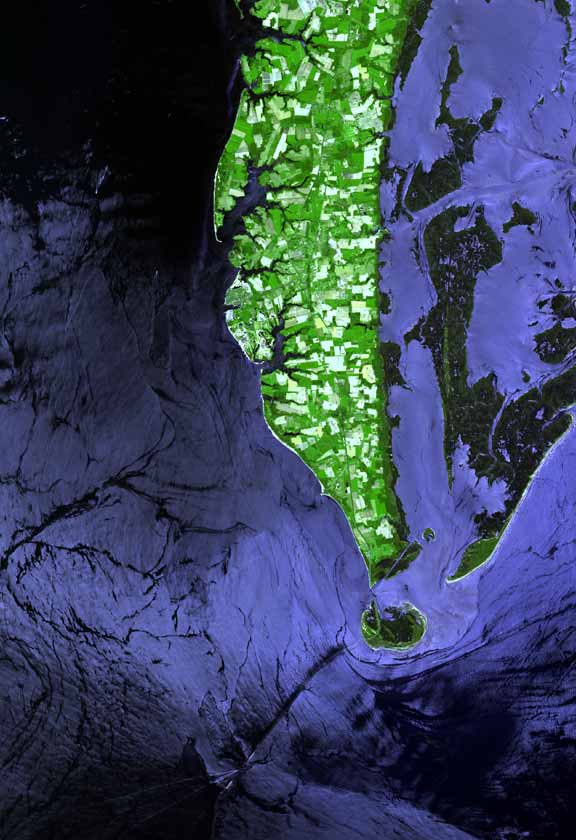
Satellite image of Cape Charles

Cape Charles is a headland, or cape, in Northampton County, Virginia. Located at the southern tip of Northampton County, it forms the southern tip of the Delmarva Peninsula and the northern side of the entrance to the Chesapeake Bay. Cape Charles was named in honor of Charles I of England, the second son of King James I and his eventual successor to the thrones of England, Scotland, and Ireland.

Cape Henry, which forms the southern side of the entrance to the Chesapeake Bay, and Cape Charles are collectively known as the Virginia Capes.

== See also ==
- Cape Charles, Virginia
- Cape Henry
- Virginia Capes
