= James Crossroads, Virginia =

Unincorporated community in Virginia, US

Coordinates: 37°21′50″N 75°56′25″W

James Crossroads is an unincorporated community in Northampton County, Virginia, United States.
