= De Witt Cottage =

Historic house in Virginia, United States

- Holland-de Witt Cottage
- U.S. National Register of Historic Places
- Virginia Landmarks Register
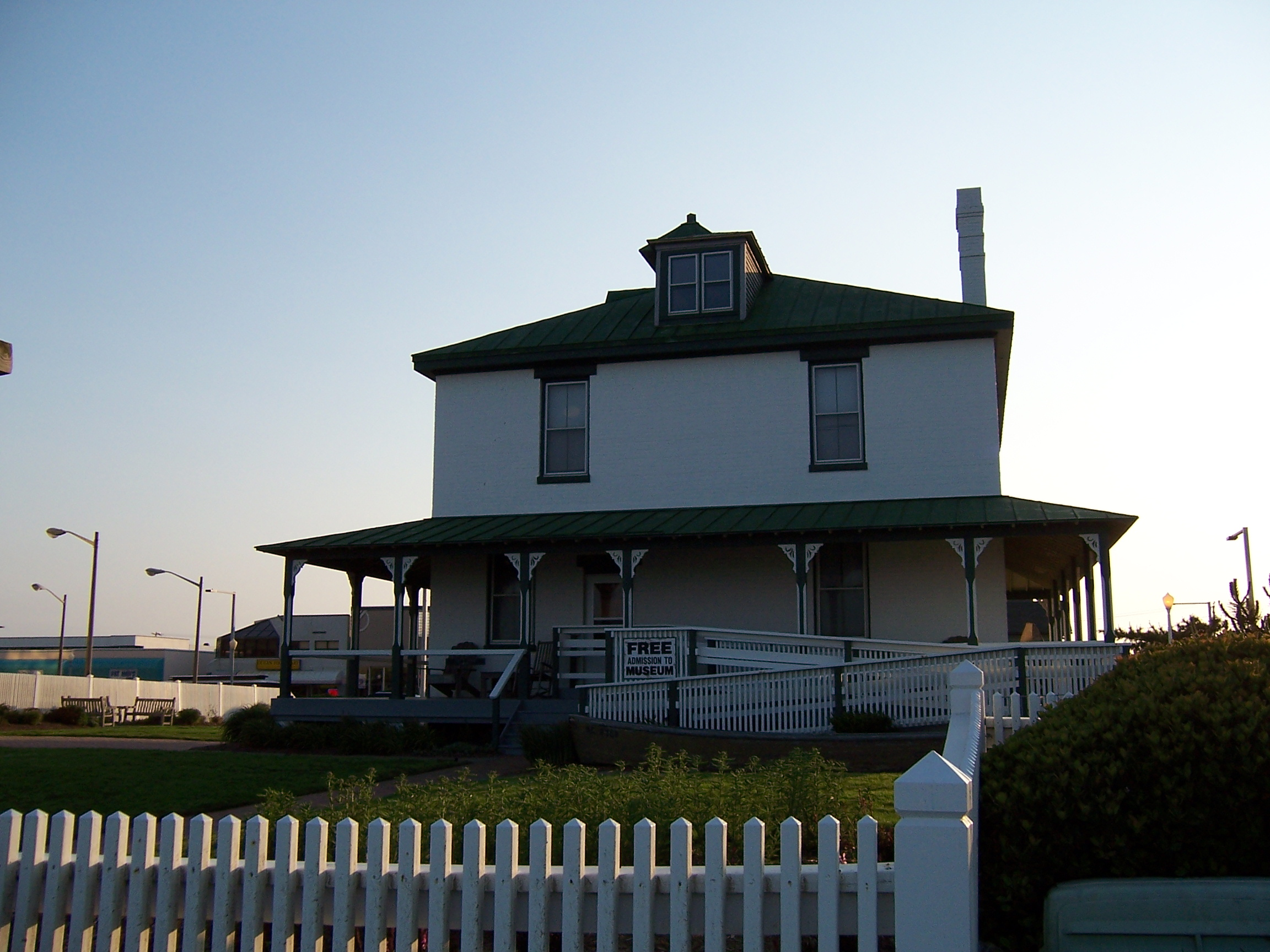
- de Witt Cottage seen from the front

- Location within Virginia Location within the United States
- Location: 1113 Atlantic Ave., Virginia Beach, Virginia
- Coordinates: 36°50′25″N 75°58′22″W
- Area: less than one acre
- Built: 1895, 1917
- Architectural style: Late Victorian, Queen Anne
- NRHP reference No.: 88000748
- VLR No.: 134-0066

Significant dates
- Added to NRHP: June 16, 1988
- Designated VLR: April 19, 1988

de Witt Cottage, also known as Holland Cottage and Wittenzand, is a historic home located at Virginia Beach, Virginia. It was built in 1895, and is a two-story, L-shaped oceanfront brick cottage surrounded on three sides by a one-story porch. It has Queen Anne style decorative detailing. It has a full basement and hipped roof with dormers. A second floor was added to the kitchen wing in 1917. The de Witt family continuously occupied the house as a permanent residence from 1909 to 1988.

It was added to the National Register of Historic Places in 1988 as "de Witt Cottage". The register listing was changed in 2026 to "Holland-De Witt Cottage".

== Atlantic Wildfowl Heritage Museum ==
Since 1995 the cottage has been home to the Atlantic Wildfowl Heritage Museum. The museum displays include bird decoys, bird art and sculptures, vintage shotguns, hunting memorabilia, and a pictorial history of Virginia Beach.
