= Toll revenue bond =

A toll revenue bond is a financial promissory note usually issued to generate funds for the construction and/or operation of a public accommodation such as an expressway, bridge, or tunnel. Funds for the repayment are obtained through revenue raised through collection of tolls from users as a fare for passage. An attraction for municipalities is that the bonds allow them to avoid legislated debt restrictions that may be encountered when issuing general obligation bonds.

Toll revenue bonds are more speculative than "general obligation" bonds, which are backed (or guaranteed) by tax revenues of a state or local government. Such bonds may be subject to default if toll revenues are insufficient to meet scheduled payments, although such defaults are rare. One example is the 23-mile long Chesapeake Bay Bridge-Tunnel (CBBT) in Virginia, one of the more ambitious such projects which was built in the mid-1960s. The facility was subject to increased construction costs due to weather, and disruption due to accidents caused by shipping traffic striking its bridges. The CBBT was in default of its toll revenue bonds for several years shortly after its completion, but these were repaid as traffic volume increased. Additional bridges were constructed later to reduce the likelihood of future disruption of revenue due to accidents.

== See also ==
See article List of toll roads for facilities financed by toll revenue bonds.
