= Eastern Shore of Virginia National Wildlife Refuge =

United States National Wildlife Refuge in Virginia

- IUCN category IV (habitat/species management area)
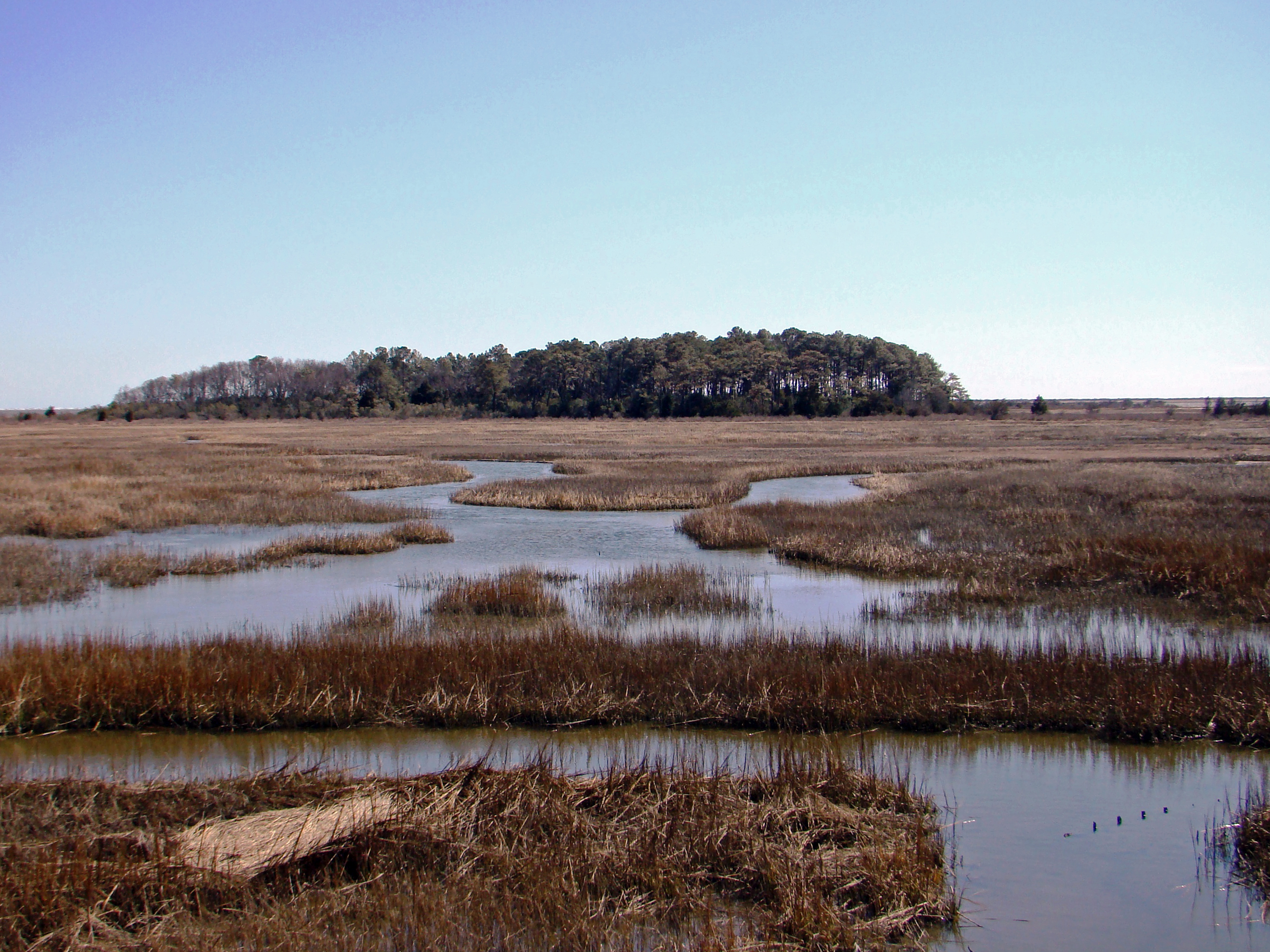

- Location within Virginia Location within the United States
- Location: Northampton County, Virginia, United States
- Nearest city: Cheriton, Virginia / Virginia Beach, Virginia
- Coordinates: 37°07′48″N 75°57′30″W
- Area: 1,127 acres (4.56 km^{2})
- Established: 1984
- Governing body: U.S. Fish and Wildlife Service
- Website: Eastern Shore of Virginia National Wildlife Refuge

The Eastern Shore of Virginia National Wildlife Refuge is a 1,127-acre (4.56 km^{2}) wildlife refuge located in Northampton County, Virginia, at the southern end of the Eastern Shore and near the tip of the Delmarva Peninsula. It is managed by the United States Fish and Wildlife Service.

The refuge was established in 1984; much of its land was previously part of Fort John Custis (later Cape Charles Air Force Station), a base used by the United States Army 1941–1948 and the United States Air Force from 1948 until 1981. Gun batteries remain from the Army period and several buildings remain from the Air Force period. A 16"/50 caliber Mark 7 gun and a projectile from an Iowa-class battleship have been placed at Battery Winslow, formerly part of Fort John Custis. Also near the refuge is Fisherman Island, classed as a "Wetland of International Importance". The refuge is an important staging area for migratory birds, and is used as well for the management and study of endangered species such as the northeastern beach tiger beetle and piping plover.
