= Delmarva Peninsula =

Peninsula on US East Coast

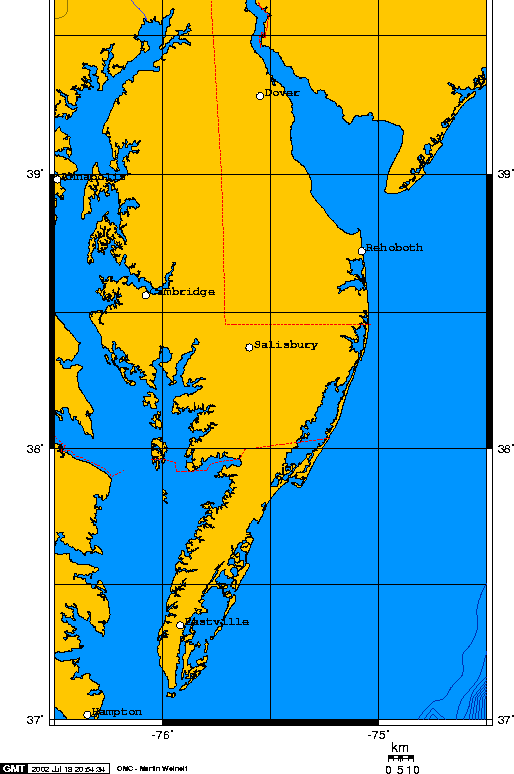
- A map of the Delmarva Peninsula with state borders shown in red
- Coordinates: 38°30′N 75°40′W
- Country: United States
- State: Delaware; Maryland; Virginia
- Largest municipalities by population: Dover; Salisbury

Population (2020)
  - Total: 818,000

The Delmarva Peninsula, or simply Delmarva, is a peninsula on the East Coast of the United States, occupied by the majority of the state of Delaware and parts of the Eastern Shore of Maryland and Eastern Shore of Virginia.

The peninsula is 170 miles (274 km) long. In width, it ranges from 70 miles (113 km) near its center, to 12 miles (19 km) at the isthmus on its northern edge, to less near its southern tip of Cape Charles. It is bordered by the Chesapeake Bay on the west, Pocomoke Sound on the southwest, and the Delaware River, Delaware Bay, and the Atlantic Ocean on the east.

The population of the twelve counties entirely on the peninsula totaled 818,014 people as of the 2020 census.

== Etymology ==
Map of the region in 1778; it is called "the peninsula between Delaware & Chesopeak bays"

In older sources, the peninsula between Delaware Bay and Chesapeake Bay was variously known as the Delaware and Chesapeake Peninsula or simply the Chesapeake Peninsula. This term derives from the Chesapeake people, Native Americans who called their home K'che-sepi-ack, which translates as "country on a great river." The Chesapeake were victims of a genocide carried out by the Powhatan sometime before the arrival of the English at Jamestown in 1607.

[It is] not long since that his priests told him how that from the Chesapeack Bay a nation should arise which should dissolve and give end to his empire, for which, not many yeares since (perplext with this divelish oracle, and divers understanding thereof), according to the ancyent and gentile customs, he destroyed and put to sword all such who might lye under any doubtful construccion of the said prophesie, as all the inhabitants, the weroance and his subjects of that province, and so remaine all the Chessiopeians at this daye, and for this cause, extinct.

The toponym Delmarva is a clipped compound of Delaware, Maryland, and Virginia (abbreviated Va.), which in turn was modeled after Delmar, a border town named after Delaware and Maryland. While Delmar was founded and named in 1859, the earliest uses of the name Delmarva occurred several years later (for example on February 10, 1877, in The Middletown Transcript newspaper in Middletown, Delaware) and appear to have been commercial and booster-driven; for example, the Delmarva Heat, Light, and Refrigerating Corp. of Chincoteague, Virginia, was in existence by 1913—but general use of the term did not occur until the 1920s.

== History ==
=== Pre-colonization ===
Some studies have shown that Native Americans inhabited the peninsula from about 10,000 BC to 8000 BC – since the last ice age.

Recent research indicates that Paleo-Indians inhabited Maryland during the pre-Clovis period (before 13,000 BP). Miles Point, Oyster Cove, and Cator's Cove archaeological sites on the coastal plain of the Delmarva Peninsula help to document a pre-Clovis presence in the Middle Atlantic region. Thus, these sites suggest a human presence in the Middle Atlantic region during the Last Glacial Maximum.

In 1970 a stone tool (a biface) said to resemble Solutrean stone tools was dredged up by the trawler Cinmar off the east coast of Virginia in an area that would have been dry land prior to the rising sea levels of the Pleistocene Epoch. The tool was allegedly found in the same dredge load that contained a mastodon's remains. The mastodon tusks were later determined to be 22,000 years old. However, studies conducted on nearby Parsons Island demonstrate that the stratigraphy of the region is disturbed. In addition several archaeological sites on the Delmarva peninsula with suggestive (but not definitive) dating between 16,000 and 18,000 years have been discovered by Darrin Lowery of the University of Delaware. These factors led Stanford and Bradley to reiterate in 2014 their academic advocacy of pre-Clovis peoples in North America and their possible link to Paleolithic Europeans.

==== Lifestyles ====
Native settlements relocated as natural conditions dictated. They set up villages – scattered groups of thatch houses and cultivated gardens – where conditions favored farming. In the spring they planted crops, which the women and children tended while the men hunted and fished. In the fall they harvested crops, storing food in baskets or underground pits. During the harsh winter, whole communities would move to hunting areas, seeking the deer, rabbit and other game that kept them alive until the spring fishing season. When the farmland around their villages became less productive – the inhabitants did not practice crop rotation – the native people would abandon the site and move to another location.

==== Populations ====
The primary Indigenous peoples of the ocean side of the lower peninsula prior to the arrival of Europeans were the Assateague, including the Assateague, Transquakin, Choptico, Moteawaughkin, Quequashkecaquick, Hatsawap, Wachetak, Marauqhquaick, and Manaskson. Their territories and populations ranged from Cape Charles, Virginia, to the Indian River inlet in Delaware.

The upper peninsula and the Chesapeake shore was the home of Nanticoke-speaking people such as the Nentigo and Choptank. The Assateague and Nentigo made a number of treaties with the colony of Maryland, but the land was gradually taken and those treaties dissolved for the use of the colonists, and the native peoples of the peninsula assimilated into other Algonquian tribes as far north as Ontario.

Currently, the peninsula is within the traditional territory of the Piscataway, Nentego, and Lenape peoples.

=== Colonization ===
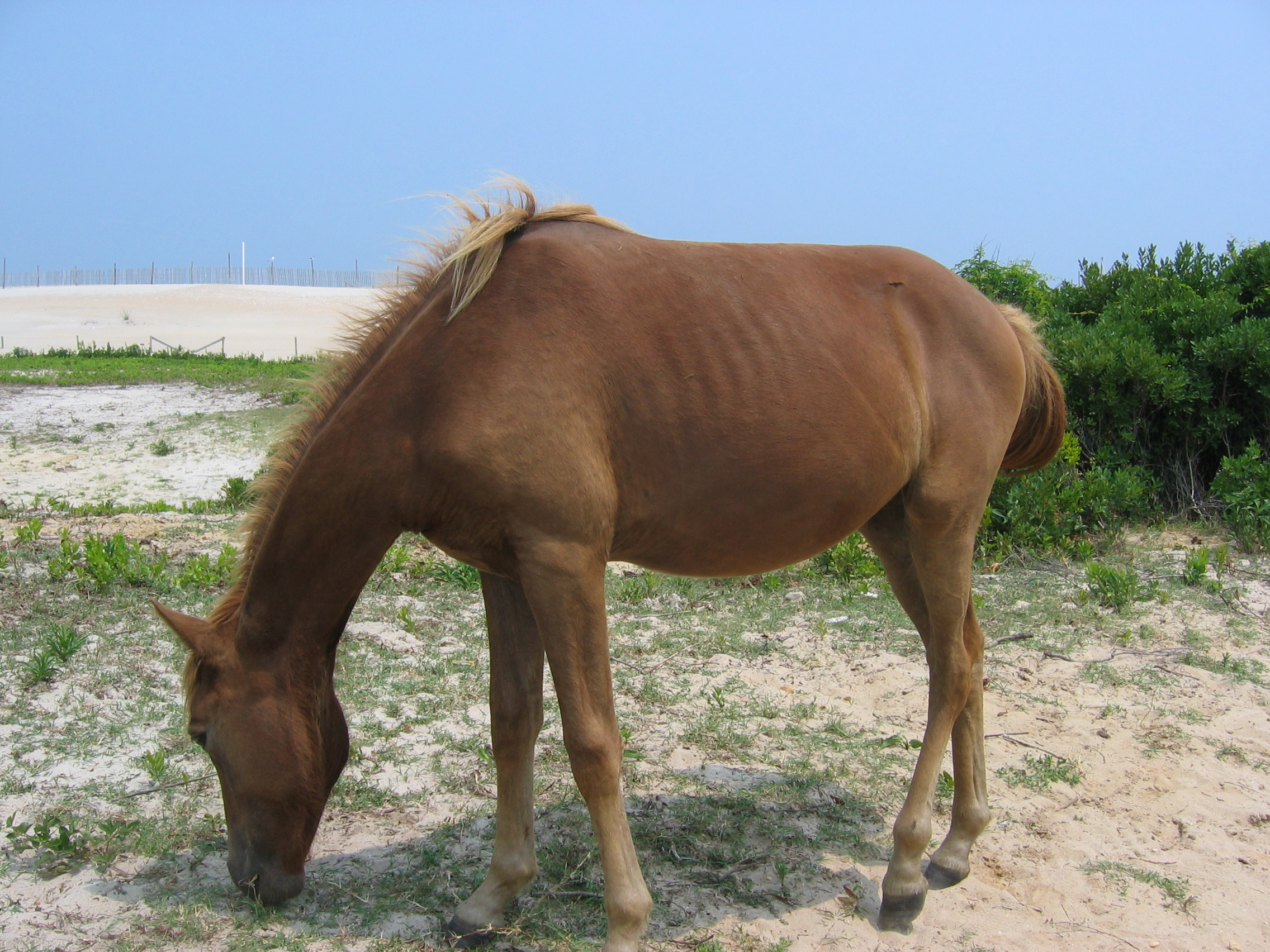
A feral pony of Assateague Island

In 1566, an expedition sent from Spanish Florida by Pedro Menéndez de Avilés reached the Delmarva Peninsula. The expedition consisted of two Dominican friars, thirty soldiers and an indigenous Virginia boy, Don Luis, in an effort to set up a Spanish colony in the Chesapeake. At the time, the Spanish believed the Chesapeake to be an opening to the fabled Northwest Passage. However, a storm thwarted their attempts at establishing a colony. The land that is currently Delaware was first colonized by the Dutch West India Company in 1631 as Zwaanendael. That colony lasted one year before a dispute with local Indians led to its destruction. In 1638, New Sweden was established which colonized the northern part of the state, together with the Delaware Valley. Eventually, the Dutch, who had maintained that their claim to Delaware arose from the colony of 1631, recaptured Delaware and incorporated the colony into the Colony of New Netherland.

However, Delaware came under British control in 1664. James I of England had granted Virginia 400 miles of Atlantic coast centered on Cape Comfort, extending west to the Pacific Ocean to a company of colonists in a series of charters from 1606 to 1611. This included a piece of the peninsula. The land was transferred from the Duke of York to William Penn in 1682 and was governed with Pennsylvania. The exact border was determined by the Chancery Court in 1735. In 1776, the counties of Kent, New Castle, and Sussex declared their independence from Pennsylvania and entered the United States as the state of Delaware.

In the 1632 Charter of Maryland, King Charles I of England granted "all that Part of the Peninsula, or Chersonese, lying in the Parts of America, between the Ocean on the East and the Bay of Chesapeake on the West, divided from the Residue thereof by a Right Line drawn from the Promontory, or Head-Land, called Watkin's Point, situate upon the Bay aforesaid, near the river Wigloo, on the West, unto the main Ocean on the East; and between that Boundary on the South, unto that Part of the Bay of Delaware on the North, which lieth under the Fortieth Degree of North Latitude from the Equinoctial, where New England is terminated" to Cecil Calvert, 2nd Baron Baltimore, as the colony of Maryland. This would have included all of present-day Delaware; however, a clause in the charter granted only that part of the peninsula that had not already been colonized by Europeans by 1632. Over a century later, it was decided in the case of Penn v Lord Baltimore that, because the Dutch had colonized Zwaanendael in 1631, the portion of Maryland's charter granting Delaware to Maryland was void.

== Geography ==
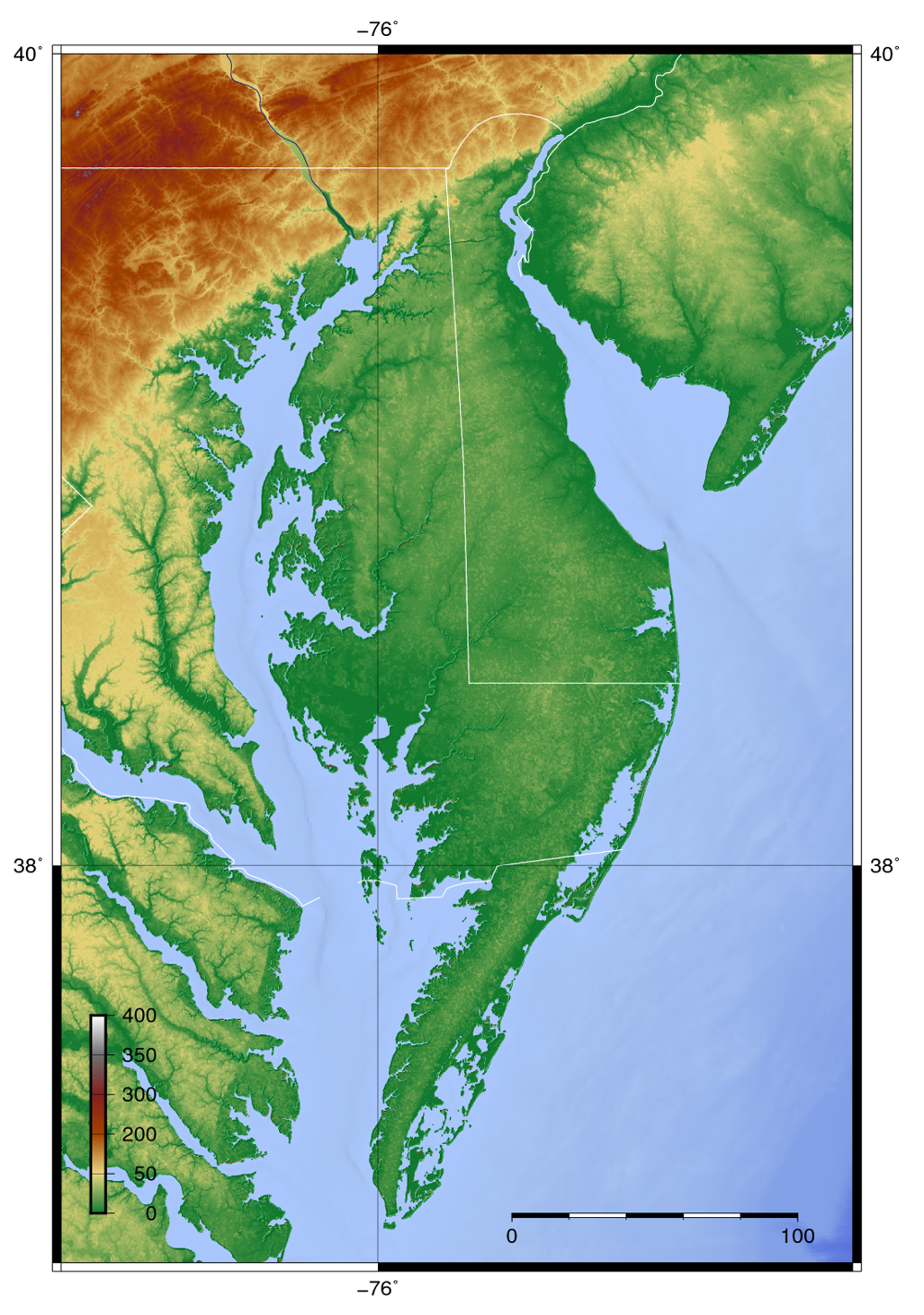
Topography of Delmarva Peninsula

At the northern point of the peninsula the Atlantic Seaboard Fall Line separates the crystalline rocks of the Piedmont from the unconsolidated sediments of the Coastal Plain. This line passes through Newark, Delaware, and Wilmington, Delaware, and Elkton, Maryland. The northern isthmus of the peninsula is transected by the sea-level Chesapeake and Delaware Canal. Several bridges cross the canal, and the Chesapeake Bay Bridge and the Chesapeake Bay Bridge–Tunnel join the peninsula to mainland Maryland and Virginia, respectively. Another point of access is Lewes, Delaware, reachable by the Cape May–Lewes Ferry from Cape May, New Jersey.

Dover, Delaware, is the peninsula's largest city by population. The main commercial areas are Dover in the north and Salisbury, Maryland, near its center. Including all offshore islands, the largest of which is Kent Island in Maryland, the total land area south of the Chesapeake and Delaware Canal is 5,454 sq mi (14,130 km^{2}). At the 2020 census the total population was 818,000, giving an average population density of 149.43 inhabitants per square mile (57.70/km^{2}).

Cape Charles forms the southern tip of the peninsula in Virginia.

The entire Delmarva Peninsula falls within the Atlantic Coastal Plain, a flat and sandy area with very few or no hills; the highest point in the peninsula is only 102 ft (31 m) above sea level. The fall line, found in the region southwest of Wilmington, Delaware, and just north of the northern edge of the Delmarva Peninsula, is a geographic borderland where the Piedmont region transitions into the coastal plain. Its Atlantic Ocean coast is formed by the Virginia Barrier Islands in the south and Cape Henlopen in the north, encompassing Ocean City, Maryland, and the Delaware Beaches from Fenwick Island to Lewes. The peninsula has a humid subtropical climate (Cfa) according to the Köppen climate classification. According to the Trewartha climate classification, the northern half has a temperate or oceanic climate (Do).

== Culture ==
The culture of Delmarva is much like the rest of the Southern United States. The northern portion of Delmarva, such as the Wilmington metro area, is similar to the urban regions of Philadelphia, but the Maryland, Virginia, and "Slower Lower" Delaware counties are more conservative than their "mainland" counties. It has been suggested that Delmarva residents have a variation of Southern American English which is particularly prevalent in rural areas.

Delmarva is driven by agriculture and commercial fishing. Most of the land is rural, with a few large population centers, though tourism has been an important part of the region.

Delmarva has longstanding Catholic roots, but now Protestants are more numerous, with Methodism being particularly strongly represented. Numerous Catholic churches dating to the 17th century are still operating, such as Old Bohemia Church, which is dedicated to Saint Francis Xavier in Cecil County, Maryland. There are several historically significant Episcopalian churches, such as Old Trinity Church in southern Dorchester County and Christ Church in Cambridge, Maryland.

== Political divisions ==
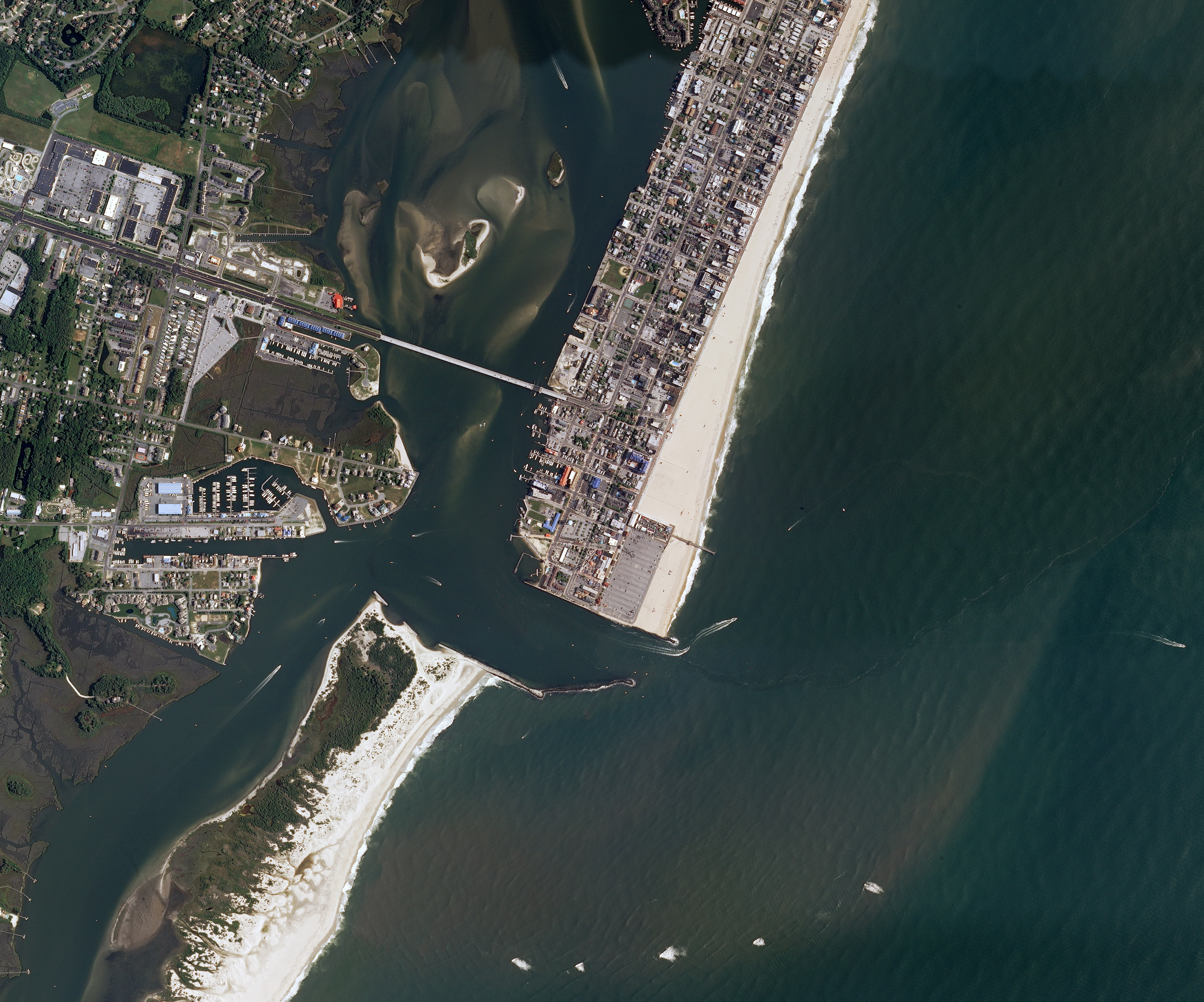
Sediment in motion at Ocean City, Maryland

The border between Maryland and Delaware, which resulted from the 80-year-long Penn–Calvert Boundary Dispute, consists of the east–west Transpeninsular Line and the perpendicular north–south portion of the Mason–Dixon line extending north to just beyond its tangential intersection with the Twelve-Mile Circle which forms Delaware's border with Pennsylvania. The border between Maryland and Virginia on the peninsula follows the Pocomoke River from the Chesapeake to a series of straight surveyed lines connecting the Pocomoke to the Atlantic Ocean.

All three counties in Delaware, New Castle (partially), Kent, and Sussex, are located on the peninsula. Of the 23 counties in Maryland, nine are on the Eastern Shore: Kent, Queen Anne's, Talbot, Caroline, Dorchester, Wicomico, Somerset, and Worcester, as well as a portion of Cecil County. Two Virginia counties are on the peninsula: Accomack and Northampton.

The following is a list of some of the notable cities and towns on the peninsula.

- Cambridge, Maryland, is the county seat of Dorchester County and a busy port on the Choptank River.
- Centreville, Maryland, is the county seat of Queen Anne's County.
- Chestertown, Maryland, is the county seat of Kent County, MD and the home of Washington College.
- Chincoteague, Virginia, is noted for its wild ponies and its beaches, administered by the U.S. Fish & Wildlife Service through Chincoteague National Wildlife Refuge; the Atlantic Ocean side of the wildlife refuge is administered by the National Park Service as the southern portion of Assateague Island National Seashore.
- Crisfield, Maryland, is a notable source of seafood.
- Delmar, Maryland, part of the Salisbury Urbanized Area, lies across the Maryland-Delaware border from its twin, Delmar, Delaware, on the Transpeninsular Line.
- Dover, Delaware, is the Delaware state capital and the peninsula's largest city in terms of population. It is also the county seat of Kent County, DE and is home to Delaware State University.
- Easton, Maryland, is the county seat of Talbot County.
- Georgetown, Delaware, is the county seat of Sussex County. Return Day, a biennial tradition dating back to the Colonial era, is held in Georgetown two days after Election Day.
- Lewes, Delaware, is the site of the first European colonization in Delaware, is nicknamed "the first town in the first state", and is a port city for the Cape May–Lewes Ferry.
- Ocean City, Maryland, is a popular beach and resort town.
- Princess Anne, Maryland, is the county seat of Somerset County and the home of the University of Maryland Eastern Shore.
- Rehoboth Beach, Delaware, "the Nation's Summer Capital", has a sixteenfold increase in population from winter to summer.
- St. Michaels, Maryland, is a popular tourist destination.
- Salisbury, Maryland, is the county seat of Wicomico County, the second largest city in the peninsula and the lower peninsula's only urbanized area. It is known as the "Crossroads of Delmarva". It is home to the Salisbury–Ocean City–Wicomico Regional Airport, the only airport on the peninsula with scheduled commercial flights. The city is also home to Salisbury University, a Maryland state university.
- Seaford, Delaware, the "Nylon Capital of the World", is the largest city in Sussex County.

At its southern tip, the Delmarva Peninsula is connected to Virginia Beach and Hampton Roads, Virginia, via the Chesapeake Bay Bridge-Tunnel which opened in 1964. The bridge tunnel is owned and administered by the Chesapeake Bay Bridge and Tunnel District.

=== Largest municipalities ===
State capital and county seat ‡

County seat†

Rank	Name	Type	Population	Area	County	State	Settled	Inc.	Origin of Name
1	Dover ‡	Capital city	39,403	23.97 sq mi	Kent	Delaware	1683	1829	Dover in Kent, England
2	Salisbury†	City	33,050	14.28 sq mi	Wicomico	Maryland	1732	1854	Named for Salisbury, England.
3	Middletown	Town	23,192	12.65 sq mi	New Castle	Delaware		1861	Halfway between Bunker Hill, Maryland, and Odessa, Delaware
4	Easton†	Town	17,101	10.56 sq mi	Talbot	Maryland		1790	Either because it is east of Saint Michaels, or named for Easton, Somerset, England.
5	Cambridge†	Town	13,096	10.34 sq mi	Dorchester	Maryland		1793	Named for Cambridge and Cambridgeshire, England.
6	Smyrna	Town	12,883	6.237 sq mi	Kent/New Castle	Delaware			Ancient Greek city of Smyrna
7	Milford	City	11,190	9.85 sq mi	Kent/Sussex	Delaware			Named for a gristmill and sawmill near a ford on the Mispillion River.
8	Seaford	City	7,957	5.16 sq mi	Sussex	Delaware		1865	Seaford, East Sussex
9	Georgetown †	Town	7,134	5.02 sq mi	Sussex	Delaware	1791	1869	Commissioner George Mitchell
10	Millsboro	Town	6,863	5.43 sq mi	Sussex	Delaware		1893	Large number of sawmills in the town.

The largest Virginia city on the peninsula is Chincoteague, with a 2020 census population of 3,341 residents, which ranks as the 23rd largest municipality on the peninsula.

=== Proposed state ===
At various times in history, residents of the Delmarva Peninsula have proposed that its Maryland and Virginia portions secede from their respective states, merging with Kent County and Sussex County, Delaware, to create the state of Delmarva. A Delmarva State Party with this aim was founded in 1992. A combined population with the Eastern Shores of Maryland and Virginia, with the aforementioned two Delaware counties, would be about 750,000, or 921,739 in 2020, roughly the population of South Dakota. Including New Castle County, Delaware, the combined population would be 1,492,458 in 2020, roughly the population of Hawaii or New Hampshire.

Legislative attempts to break away the Eastern Shore counties of Maryland and join them with Delaware were made several times. In November 1776, delegates from the Eastern Shore attempted to insert a clause into the Maryland Declaration of Rights that would allow the shore counties to secede from Maryland, with the clause being defeated 30–17. In 1833, the secession movement came close to succeeding: a Delaware resolution proposing the Eastern Shore of Maryland be absorbed into Delaware passed the Delaware Senate and Delaware House of Representatives, then passed the Maryland House of Delegates with a 40–24 vote, but failed to be voted out of committee by the Maryland Senate. The following year, a Caroline County representative proposed allowing the Eastern Shore to secede via referendum, but the Maryland House of Delegates voted 60–5 to indefinitely postpone the measure, and that proposal was never taken up again. In 1851, Dorchester County delegate and future Maryland Governor Thomas Holliday Hicks proposed an amendment that would give the Eastern Shore the right to vote itself into Delaware, but the amendment failed 51–27.

Presidential election results

Including the entirety of New Castle County, DE and Cecil County, MD
Year	Democratic	Republican	Others
2024	50.9% 394,993	47.4% 367,806	1.7% 13,899
2020	53.0% 402,229	45.3% 343,352	1.7% 13,049
2016	47.6% 322,702	47.2% 320,387	5.2% 35,135
2012	53.0% 340,859	45.4% 292,042	1.6% 10,172
2008	55.5% 354,566	43.2% 276,438	1.3% 8,324
2004	48.4% 279,880	50.6% 292,716	1.0% 5,567
2000	51.0% 251,836	45.8% 226,268	3.2% 15,766
1996	48.8% 202,681	39.8% 165,360	11.3% 46,940
1992	41.2% 183,693	38.3% 170,585	20.5% 91,437
1988	41.2% 157,129	58.2% 222,013	0.6% 2,452
1984	37.7% 143,171	62.0% 235,378	0.3% 1,319
1980	44.4% 156,436	48.5% 170,788	7.2% 25,251
1976	51.1% 173,700	47.8% 162,669	1.1% 3,875
1972	35.8% 119,150	62.9% 209,460	1.2% 4,148
1968	38.0% 118,585	45.1% 140,933	16.9% 52,896
1964	59.6% 173,647	40.3% 117,394	0.2% 549
1960	49.7% 142,583	50.0% 143,578	0.3% 751

== Economy ==
The peninsula was the premier location for truck farming of vegetables during the 19th and early 20th centuries. Though it has been largely eclipsed by California's production, the area still produces significant quantities of tomatoes, green beans, corn, soybeans—Queen Anne's County is the largest producer of soy beans in Maryland—and other popular vegetables.

The Eastern Shore is also known for its poultry farms, the most well-known of which is Perdue Farms, founded in Salisbury. The Delaware is a rare breed of chicken created on the peninsula.

Tourism is a major contributor to the peninsula's economy with the beaches at Rehoboth Beach, Delaware, Ocean City, Maryland, Assateague Island National Seashore, Maryland, and Chincoteague National Wildlife Refuge, Virginia, being popular tourist destinations.

Salisbury University also adds to the economic activity of Delmarva, with an estimated $480 million in contribution impact. The university is the largest four-year comprehensive educational institution on the Eastern Shore, and serves as the largest employer other than Perdue, supporting an estimated 3,200 jobs.

=== Media ===
The area is served by four television markets. Cecil, Kent, Queen Anne's, Caroline and Talbot Counties in Maryland are primarily served by the Baltimore, Maryland, designated market area and stations WBAL-TV, WJZ-TV, WMAR-TV and WBFF-TV. New Castle and Kent Counties in Delaware are served by the Philadelphia, Pennsylvania, designated market area and stations WPVI-TV, WCAU-TV, KYW-TV and WTXF-TV. Sussex, Dorchester, Wicomico, Worcester and Somerset Counties are served by the Salisbury, Maryland, designated market area, the only based on the peninsula. These stations are WBOC-TV, WMDT-TV, and WRDE-LD. Accomack and Northampton Counties are primarily served by the Norfolk/Virginia Beach designated market area and stations WAVY-TV, WVEC-TV and WTKR-TV.

== Transportation ==
The peninsula has minor airports with few commercial carriers, as it is overshadowed by proximate major airports in Baltimore and Philadelphia. Its airports include Wilmington Airport southwest of Wilmington, Delaware, Salisbury Regional Airport to the southeast of Salisbury, Maryland, and Dover Air Force Base to the southeast of Dover, Delaware.

Major north–south highways include U.S. 9, U.S. 13, U.S. 50 and U.S. 301. Highways U.S. 50 and U.S. 301 run over the Chesapeake Bay Bridge on the western side of the peninsula. U.S. 13 at the southern limit of the peninsula connects through the Chesapeake Bay Bridge–Tunnel to the main part of Virginia.

Until 1957, the Pennsylvania Railroad provided service to the peninsula. It ran the Del-Mar-Va Express day train from New York City, through Wilmington, Dover, Delmar, Salisbury, and Pocomoke City to the Cape Charles, Virginia, ferry docks and it ran the Cavalier counterpart night train. At that point, ferries ran to Norfolk, Virginia. In earlier decades branches ran to Centreville, Maryland; Oxford, Maryland; Cambridge, Maryland; Georgetown and Lewes, Delaware; and to Franklin City, Virginia. Today, the Delmarva Central Railroad provides freight and tanker transportation on the peninsula.

== See also ==
- Delmarva Shorebirds
- List of peninsulas
- List of railroad lines in the Delmarva Peninsula
- List of U.S. multistate regions
- Wallops Flight Facility

== Sources ==
- Strachey, William (1849) [composed c. 1612]. The Historie of Travaile into Virginia Britannia. London: Hakluyt Society.
